= List of Tau Alpha Pi chapters =

Tau Alpha Pi is a scholastic honor society that recognizes academic achievement among students in the field of engineering technology.In the following list of chapters, active chapters are indicated in bold and inactive chapters and institutions are in italics.

Chapter	Former name	Charter date	Institution	Locations	Status	Ref.
Georgia Alpha	Alpha Alpha	1953	Southern Polytechnic State University	Marietta, Georgia	Inactive	
	Beta Alpha	February 1953	Academy of Aeronautics	Flushing, New York	Inactive	
	Gamma Alpha	Before July 1953	Ohio Mechanics Institute	Cincinnati, Ohio	Inactive	
**Massachusetts Alpha**	Delta Alpha	August 1953	Wentworth Institute of Technology	Boston, Massachusetts	Active	
Missouri Alpha	Epsilon Alpha	Before December 1963	Central Technical Institute	Kansas City, Missouri	Inactive	(Note: Central Technical Institute became the DeVry Institute of Technology, Kansas City Campus.)
	Theta Alpha	February 1964–19xx ?; April 1976	Virginia Western Community College	Roanoke, Virginia	Inactive	(Note: The chapter was chartered at Roanoke Technical Institute, later called Virginia Western Community College.)
	Iota Alpha	Before January 1965	Temple University Technical Institute	Philadelphia, Pennsylvania	Inactive	
	Lambda Alpha	Before May 1971	Norwalk State Technical College	Norwalk, Connecticut	Inactive	
	Mu Alpha		Midlands Technical College	Columbia, South Carolina	Inactive	
Illinois Alpha	Nu Alpha		Lake Land College	Mattoon, Illinois	Inactive	
**New Jersey Alpha**	Omicron Alpha		New Jersey Institute of Technology	Newark, New Jersey	Active	
**Vermont Alpha**	Chi Alpha	Before June 1978	Vermont Technical College	Randolph Center, Vermont	Active	
New Mexico Alpha	Omega Alpha		New Mexico State University	Las Cruces, New Mexico	Inactive	
Georgia Beta	Alpha Beta		DeVry University, Atlanta Campus	Atlanta, Georgia	Inactive	
	Beta Beta	August 3, 1954	Erie County Technical Institute	Williamsville, New York	Inactive	(Note: Chapter formed from Tau Sigma, a local honor society.)
**Ohio Beta**	Gamma Beta	May 1963	University of Dayton	Dayton, Ohio	Active	
	Epsilon Beta		Florissant Valley Community College	Ferguson, Missouri	Inactive	
	Theta Beta	Before January 1968	Old Dominion University	Norfolk, Virginia	Inactive	
**Pennsylvania Beta**	Iota Beta	1966	Penn State Wilkes-Barre	Lehman Township, Pennsylvania	Active	
**Pennsylvania Beta**	Iota Beta	1966	Penn State Altoona	Altoona, Pennsylvania	Active	
**Pennsylvania Beta**	Iota Beta	1966	Penn State Berks	Spring Township, Pennsylvania	Active	
**Pennsylvania Beta**	Iota Beta	1966	Penn State DuBois	DuBois, Pennsylvania	Active	
**Pennsylvania Beta**	Iota Beta	1966	Penn State Erie, The Behrend College	Erie, Pennsylvania	Active	
**Pennsylvania Beta**	Iota Beta	1966	Penn State Fayette	Uniontown, Pennsylvania	Active	
**Pennsylvania Beta**	Iota Beta	1966	Penn State New Kensington	New Kensington, Pennsylvania	Active	
**Pennsylvania Beta**	Iota Beta	1966	Penn State York	Spring Garden Township, Pennsylvania	Active	
Pennsylvania Beta	Iota Beta	1966	Pennsylvania State University Hazleton	Hazleton, Pennsylvania	Inactive	
Pennsylvania Beta	Iota Beta	1966	Pennsylvania State University, Worthington/Scranton	Dunmore, Pennsylvania	Inactive	
	Kappa Beta	Before December 1968	Anne Arundel Community College	Anne Arundel County, Maryland	Inactive	
**Illinois Beta**	Nu Beta	1982	Southern Illinois University Carbondale	Carbondale, Illinois	Active	
	Xi Beta		Northrop University	Inglewood, California	Inactive	(Note: The University closed in 1991.)
**New Jersey Beta**	Omicron Beta		Union College	Cranford, New Jersey	Active	
	Upsilon Beta	1979	Arizona State University	Tempe, Arizona	Inactive	
**Tennessee Beta**	Psi Beta		Nashville State Community College	Nashville, Tennessee	Active	
	Gamma Gamma	February 1970	Tri-County Technical Institute	Ohio	Inactive	
Texas Gamma	Zeta Gamma		Texas A&M University	College Station, Texas	Inactive	
	Mu Gamma		Spartanburg Technical College	Spartanburg, South Carolina	Inactive	
	Sigma Gamma		St. Petersburg Junior College	St. Petersburg, Florida	Inactive	
		January 1978	Clemson University	Clemson, South Carolina	Inactive	
**Connecticut Delta**	Lambda Delta	1984	Gateway Community and Technical College	North Haven, Connecticut	Active	(Note: Chapter formed at Greater New Haven State Technical College which merged with South Central Community College in 1992 to form Gateway Community College.)
	Xi Delta	1979	California Polytechnic State University, San Luis Obispo	San Luis Obispo, California	Inactive	
**Indiana Delta**	Pi Delta	1979–1996; April 2001	Purdue University Northwest	Hammond, Indiana	Active	
**New York Epsilon**	Beta Epsilon	January 1979	Hudson Valley Community College	Troy, New York	Active	(Note: Sources call this the Beta Epsilon and the Omicron Delta chapter.)
Ohio Epsilon	Gamma Epsilon		Devry University, Columbus Campus	Columbus, Ohio	Inactive	
Louisiana Alpha		February 1980	Louisiana Tech University	Ruston, Louisiana	Inactive	
Mississippi Alpha		May 1983	University of Southern Mississippi	Hattiesburg, Mississippi	Inactive	
		June 1984	Fort Valley State University	Fort Valley, Georgia	Inactive	
		Before June 1984	Thames Valley State Technical College	New Haven, Connecticut	Inactive	
Connecticut Epsilon	Lambda Epsilon	1986	University of Hartford	West Hartford, Connecticut	Inactive	
Ohio Zeta	Gamma Zeta	June 1987	Owens Community College, Toledo Campus	Perrysburg, Ohio	Inactive	
**New Jersey Zeta**	Omicron Zeta	Before June 1986	County College of Morris	Randolph, New Jersey.	Active	
**Indiana Alpha**	Pi Alpha		Purdue University	West Lafayette, Indiana	Active	
	Pi Zeta		Purdue Polytechnic Institute Anderson	Anderson, Indiana	Inactive	
**Maine Alpha**		July 1986	University of Maine	Orono, Maine	Active	
**Michigan Delta**		1990	Western Michigan University	Kalamazoo, Michigan	Active	
	Pi Theta	May 1990	Purdue Polytechnic Institute Kokomo	Kokomo, Indiana	Inactive	
**New York Xi**	Beta Xi	Before January 1993	Alfred State College	Alfred, New York	Active	
**South Carolina Eta**	Mu Eta	October 1995	Piedmont Technical College	Greenwood, South Carolina	Active	
Arkansas Alpha		1997	Arkansas State Technical Institute	Beebe, Arkansas	Inactive	
Alabama Alpha			University of Alabama	Tuscaloosa, Alabama	Inactive	
Arizona Delta			DeVry University, Phoenix Campus	Phoenix, Arizona	Inactive	
**Arkansas Beta**			University of Arkansas at Little Rock	Little Rock, Arkansas	Active	
California Alpha			California State Polytechnic University, Pomona	Pomona, California	Inactive	
California Delta			DeVry University, Sherman Oaks Campus	Sherman Oaks, California	Inactive	
California Epsilon			DeVry University, Pomona Campus	Pomona, California	Inactive	
California Zeta			DeVry University, Long Beach Campus	Long Beach, California	Inactive	
**California Eta**			California State University Maritime Academy	Vallejo, California	Active	
California Lambda			DeVry University, Fremont Campus	Fremont, California	Inactive	
Colorado Beta			Colorado State University Pueblo	Pueblo, Colorado	Inactive	
**Colorado Gamma**			Metropolitan State University of Denver	Denver, Colorado	Active	
Florida Beta			University of Central Florida	Orlando, Florida	Inactive	
Florida Gamma			DeVry University, Orlando Campus	Orlando, Florida	Inactive	
Florida Delta			DeVry University, South Florida Metro Campus	Miramar, Florida	Inactive	
Georgia Delta			Savannah State University	Savannah, Georgia	Inactive	
Illinois Gamma			DeVry University, Addison Campus	Addison, Illinois	Inactive	
Illinois Delta			DeVry University, Chicago Campus	Chicago, Illinois	Inactive	
Indiana Beta			Indiana University–Purdue University Fort Wayne	Fort Wayne, Indiana	Inactive	
**Indiana Pi Beta**			Purdue University in Indianapolis	Indianapolis, Indiana	Active	
Louisiana Delta			Northwestern State University of Louisiana	Natchitoches, Louisiana	Inactive	
**Louisiana Pi**			Southeastern Louisiana University	Hammond, Louisiana	Active	
**Maryland Alpha**			Capitol Technology University	South Laurel, Maryland	Active	
Maryland Beta ?			Prince George's Community College	Largo, Maryland	Inactive	
Massachusetts Beta			Northeastern University	Boston, Massachusetts	Inactive	
Massachusetts Delta			Springfield Technical Community College	Springfield, Massachusetts	Inactive	
**Michigan Beta**			Wayne State University	Detroit, Michigan	Active	
**Michigan Epsilon**			Ferris State University	Big Rapids, Michigan	Active	
**New York Gamma**			Queensborough Community College	Port Washington, New York	Active	
**New York Delta**			Bronx Community College	Bronx, New York City, New York	Active	
New York Theta			Broome Community College	Binghamton, New York	Inactive	
**New York Iota**			Rochester Institute of Technology	Rochester, New York	Active	
**New York Kappa**			SUNY Polytechnic Institute	Utica, New York	Active	
New York Lambda			TCI College of Technology	New York City, New York	Inactive	(Note: College closed in 2017.)
**New York Mu**			State University of New York at Canton	Canton, New York	Active	
**North Carolina Beta**			University of North Carolina at Charlotte	Charlotte, North Carolina	Active	
**North Carolina Delta**			Western Carolina University	Cullowhee, North Carolina	Active	
**North Carolina Zeta**			Gaston College	Dallas, North Carolina	Active	
Ohio Alpha			University of Cincinnati	Cincinnati, Ohio	Inactive	
**Ohio Eta**			University of Akron	Akron, Ohio	Active	
Ohio Theta			University of Toledo	Toledo, Ohio	Inactive	
**Ohio Iota**			Sinclair Community College	Dayton, Ohio	Active	
**Ohio Mu**			James A. Rhodes State College	Lima, Ohio	Active	
Oregon Alpha			Oregon Institute of Technology	Klamath Falls, Oregon	Inactive	
Pennsylvania Gamma			DeVry University, Fort Washington Campus	Fort Washington, Pennsylvania	Inactive	
**Pennsylvania Delta**			Drexel University	Philadelphia, Pennsylvania	Active	
South Carolina Beta			Aiken Technical College	Graniteville, South Carolina	Inactive	
South Carolina Iota			South Carolina State University	Orangeburg, South Carolina	Inactive	
**Tennessee Alpha**			University of Memphis	Memphis, Tennessee	Active	
**Tennessee Delta**			Chattanooga State Community College	Chattanooga, Tennessee	Active	
Texas Alpha			University of Houston	Houston, Texas	Inactive	
Texas Zeta			University of Houston–Downtown	Houston, Texas	Inactive	
Texas Eta			Prairie View A&M University	Prairie View, Texas	Inactive	
Texas Iota			University of North Texas	Denton, Texas	Inactive	
**Utah Alpha**			Brigham Young University	Provo, Utah	Active	
**Utah Beta**			Weber State University	Ogden, Utah	Active	
**West Virginia Beta**			Bluefield State University	Bluefield, West Virginia	Active	
Wisconsin Alpha			Milwaukee School of Engineering	Milwaukee, Wisconsin	Inactive	
			Arizona State University, East	Mesa, Arizona	Inactive	
			Devry University, Decatur Metro Campus	Decatur, Georgia	Inactive	
			DeVry University, Dallas	Irving, Texas	Inactive	
			Kennesaw State University	Marietta, Georgia	Inactive	
			Michigan Technological University	Houghton, Michigan	Inactive	
			St. Louis Community College, St. Ann Campus	St. Ann, Missouri	Inactive	
			University of Southern Indiana	Evansville, Indiana	Inactive	
