= Penn State Brandywine =

Public university in Middletown Township, Pennsylvania, US

Coordinates: 39.9274°N 75.4481°W

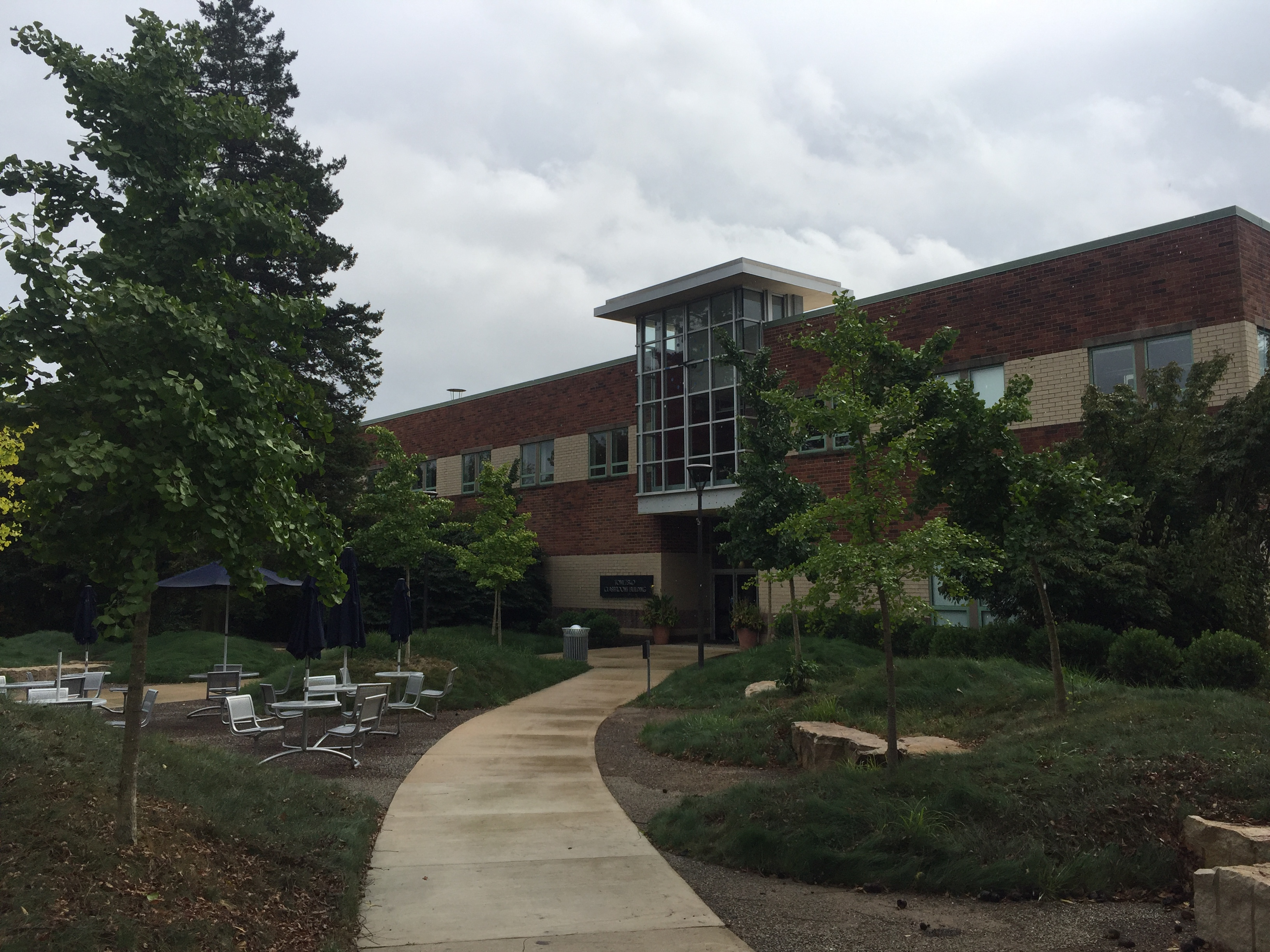
- PSU classroom in October 2017
- Type: Commonwealth campus
- Established: 1967; 59 years ago
- Parent institution: Pennsylvania State University
- Chancellor: Marilyn J. Wells
- President: Neeli Bendapudi
- Students: 1,078 (Fall 2025)
- Undergraduates: 1,078 (Fall 2025)
- Location: Middletown Township, Pennsylvania, U.S.
- Campus: Suburban
- Colors: Navy Blue and White
- Sporting affiliations: NCAA Division III - UEC
- Mascot: Nittany Lion
- Website: brandywine.psu.edu

Penn State Brandywine is a commonwealth campus of the Pennsylvania State University located in Middletown Township, Pennsylvania, United States. The campus was formerly known as Penn State Delaware County. The campus has baccalaureate and associate degrees and certificate programs. The campus is located on over 112 acres (450,000 m^{2}) of grounds. In August 2017, the campus established on-campus housing for the first time with the opening of Orchard Hall, a 250-bed residence hall.

== Athletics ==
Undergraduate demographics as of Fall 2023
Race and ethnicity	Total
White	50%
Black	18%
Asian	14%
Hispanic	9%
Two or more races	5%
International student	3%
Unknown	2%
Economic diversity
Low-income (Note: The percentage of students who received an income-based federal Pell grant intended for low-income students.)	40%
Affluent (Note: The percentage of students who are a part of the American middle class at the bare minimum.)	60%

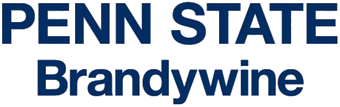
PSB athletics wordmark

The Penn State Brandywine athletic teams are called the Nittany Lions. The campus competes as a member of the Division III ranks of the National Collegiate Athletic Association (NCAA), primarily competing within the United East Conference since joining in the 2024–25 academic year. This entrance follows a successful exploratory year in the conference during the 2023–24 academic year.

Penn State–Brandywine competes in 12 intercollegiate sports. Men's sports include baseball, basketball, cross country, golf, soccer, and tennis; while women's sports include basketball, cross country, soccer, softball, tennis, and volleyball.

Prior to joining the NCAA, the Nittany Lions were members of the United States Collegiate Athletic Association (USCAA) and competed in the Pennsylvania State University Athletic Conference (PSUAC) until after the 2023–24 academic year.
