= Penn State Shenango =

University in Sharon, Pennsylvania, US

Coordinates: 41.234954°N 80.508993°W

- Type: Public satellite campus
- Established: 1965
- Parent institution: Pennsylvania State University
- Affiliations: PSUAC (USCAA)
- President: Neeli Bendapudi
- Director: Jo Anne Carrick
- Students: 264 (Fall 2025)
- Undergraduates: 264 (Fall 2025)
- Location: Sharon, Pennsylvania, U.S.
- Campus: Urban 14.5 acres (0.05 km^{2})
- Colors: Blue and White
- Mascot: Nittany Lion
- Website: shenango.psu.edu/

Penn State Shenango is a commonwealth campus of the Pennsylvania State University that is located in Sharon, Pennsylvania. Penn State Shenango is the only urban campus in the Penn State system, although some parts of Penn State Altoona that are located in the heart of Altoona's downtown are urban in nature. In May 2025, the Board of Trustees of Pennsylvania State University announced the closure of seven of its twenty regional Commonwealth campuses after the Spring 2027 semester, including Penn State Shenango.

== History ==
In 1963, a group of local citizens formed the Shenango Valley Citizens College Procurement Committee with the purpose of expanding the higher education opportunities in the area. After a series of meetings with the Penn State Board of Trustees, a plan was developed in 1964 for creating a new Penn State campus in Sharon that would allow students to start their college career locally and transfer to the flagship campus in University Park. The State Board of Education approved this proposal, and the first students were admitted to the Penn State Shenango Valley campus in 1965.

The Lecture Hall is the oldest structure on the Penn State Shenango campus

Initially, classes were held in Kennedy Catholic High School as funds were raised for the construction of a permanent campus. After briefly considering building a campus from scratch in Hickory Township (now Hermitage), the directors instead chose to base the campus around existing buildings in downtown Sharon. The first buildings obtained for the campus were Sharon Hall and Lecture Hall, which were purchased from the Sharon Central School District.

As programs and enrollment grew, new buildings were purchased or erected adjacent to the Sharon and Lecture halls during the 1970s and 1980s. The word "Valley" was the subsequently dropped from the official name of the campus.

At the start of the 2006–2007 academic year, a $9.4 million renovation of campus was completed. The renovation updated Sharon and Lecture Halls linking them with an enclosed glass atrium. The renovations also transformed the former gymnasium space in Sharon Hall into the Great Hall including new food service, fitness, and student activities spaces.

Currently the campus is entering a capital campaign to raise funds for modernizing the Auditorium Building with an eye to adding increased accessibility, new restroom facilities, and updating the space for multiple uses. Construction on the first phase of this project was completed in 2009. Chadderton Laboratory was completely renovated in 2013 to house the newly formed Occupational Therapy Assistant program and contains office, laboratory, and classroom space for this program.

=== Closure ===
On May 22, 2025, the Board of Trustees of Pennsylvania State University announced the closure of seven of its twenty regional Commonwealth campuses, including Penn State Shenango. Enrollment had dropped to 309 students as of Fall 2024, a 68% decline from its peak and a drop of 43% in the past ten years. There were 8 other colleges within 30 miles (48 km) of the campus, which only had commuter students. In fiscal 2024, financial losses for campus were $2.9 million, and the campus had $24.0 million in deferred maintenance (or $78,000 per student). Penn State Shenango will close after the Spring 2027 semester. Current students, faculty and staff will be offered support as the campus transitions to closure over a two-year period.

== Athletics ==
Undergraduate demographics as of Fall 2023
Race and ethnicity	Total
White	79%
Black	12%
Hispanic	4%
Two or more races	4%
Economic diversity
Low-income (Note: The percentage of students who received an income-based federal Pell grant intended for low-income students.)	49%
Affluent (Note: The percentage of students who are a part of the American middle class at the bare minimum.)	51%

Penn State Shenango has student athletics participating in men's basketball, women's volleyball and women's basketball. In 2022, the campus is expected to launch a co-ed golf program. The school competes in the Penn State University Athletic Conference (PSUAC) and is a member of the United States Collegiate Athletic Association (USCAA).

The Shenango campus does not have an athletic facility of its own for sporting events. The Buhl Community Recreation Center, less than 1/2 mile from the campus, is where basketball and volleyball games are hosted. Tentatively, the Buhl Park Driving Range and Golf Course will host golf matches.

== Facilities ==
The Shenango campus consists of ten educational and support buildings, including:

- Sharon Hall (built 1928): The primary classroom and office building on campus houses administration, faculty offices, computer labs, classroom space, and the Great Hall student center.
- Lecture Hall (built 1904): Includes campus admissions and financial aid offices, classroom space, and faculty offices. A glass atrium connecting Sharon and Lecture halls was constructed in 2006.
- Science Building (built 1968): Includes faculty offices and science classrooms. This building is now considered a section of the Forker Laboratory building as part of a $8.5 million renovation that was completed in 2021.
- Forker Laboratory (built 1972): Science labs, classroom space, and the Forum, a large classroom used for lectures and events is located here. The Physical Therapy Assistant program is housed on the second floor. An $8.5 million renovation, which included a new HVAC system, science equipment upgrades, and the addition of Engineering and Physics equipment, was completed in 2021.
- Chadderton Laboratory: The former headquarters of the local television cable company, this building was renovated in 2013 and houses the Occupational Therapy Assistant program, including office, classroom, and laboratory spaces.
- McDowell Hall: Houses the campus bookstore, Human Development and Family Studies, Administration of Justice, and Administration of Justice Crime Lab.
- Lartz Memorial Library: Originally housing a commercial laundry, and then a local steelworkers union hall, the Library was renovated in 1996 and houses the campus library collections, study areas, a classroom, and the Media Commons.
- B&B Building: Another former office building that is currently used for storage. Prior to storage, this building was home to the Physical Therapy Assistant program and Ag Extension office.
- Penn State Theatre (Auditorium) (built 1928): The former Auditorium of the Sharon Central School District, now used for large gatherings including commencement, concerts, and the Penn State Lecture Series. A multi-phase renovation project began in 2008.
- Maintenance Building: Houses campus maintenance department and services.

== Notable alumni ==
- Dwight Schrute, fictional character on The Office played by Rainn Wilson
