= Penn State Abington =

Public university in Abington, Pennsylvania, U.S.

Coordinates: 40.11746°N 75.10914°W

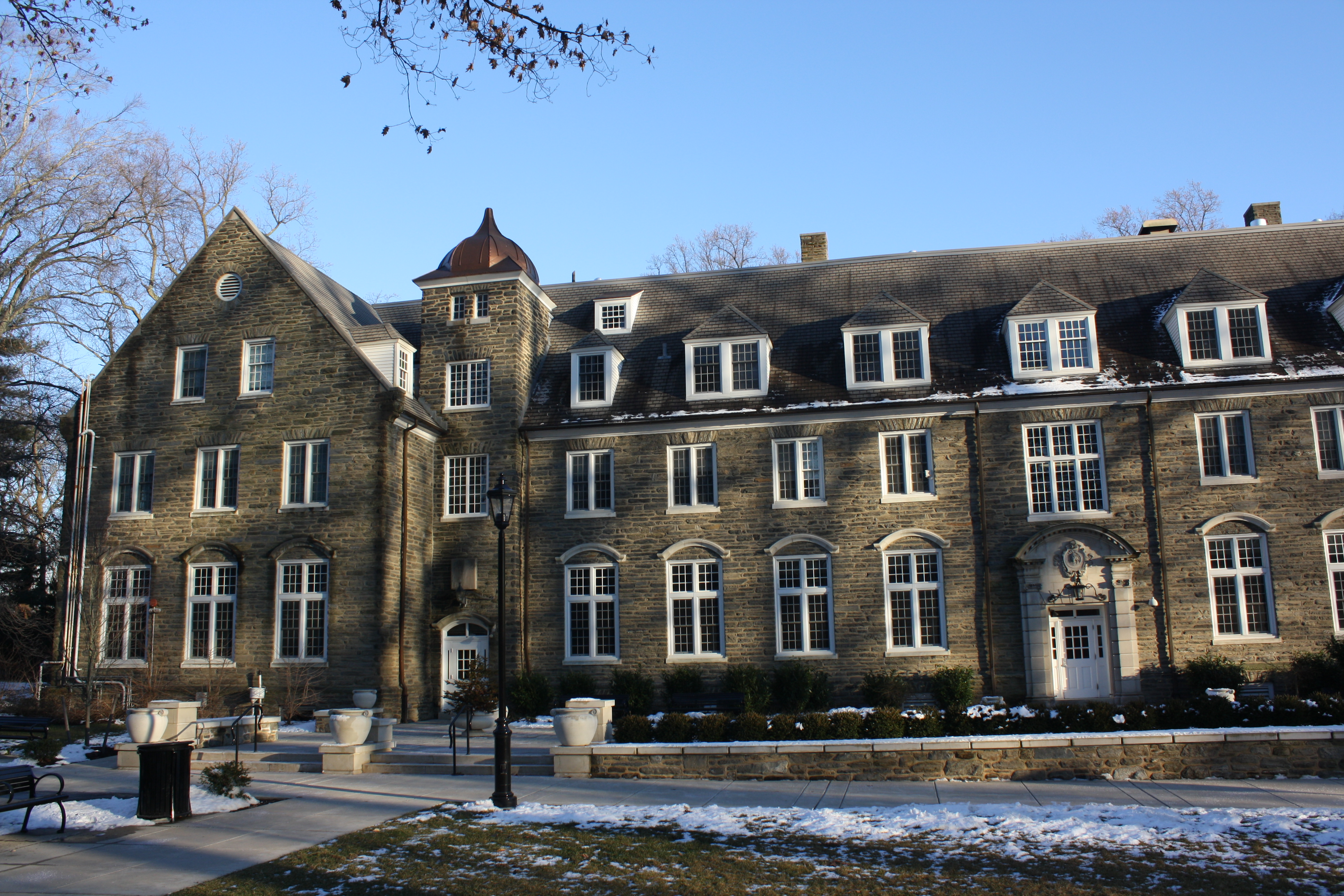
- Sutherland Building
- Former names: Chestnut Street Female Seminary (1850–1883); Ogontz School for Young Ladies (1883–1950); Penn State Ogontz (1950–1995); Penn State Abington-Ogontz (1995–1997)
- Type: Commonwealth campus
- Established: 1850
- Parent institution: Pennsylvania State University
- Academic affiliations: Space-grant
- Chancellor: Gary Liguori
- President: Neeli Bendapudi
- Academic staff: 107 full-time
- Students: 2,715 (Fall 2025)
- Undergraduates: 2,710 (Fall 2025)
- Postgraduates: 5 (Fall 2025)
- Location: Abington, Pennsylvania, U.S.
- Campus: Suburban
- Nickname: Lions
- Sporting affiliations: NCAA Division III - UEC
- Mascot: Nittany Lion
- Website: abington.psu.edu

Penn State Abington is a commonwealth campus of the Pennsylvania State University located in Abington, Pennsylvania, United States. The campus is set on 45 acres (180,000 m^{2}) of wooded land just five miles north of Philadelphia. The roughly 3,000 undergraduate students (full-time and part-time students combined) are taught by a full-time staff of over 150 professors and teaching assistants.

Two associate degree programs, twenty-five baccalaureate degree programs, and several continuing education programs designed for adult students are available at Penn State Abington. Students may start any of Penn State's 275+ baccalaureate programs at the Abington campus and complete them at another Penn State campus, including the main University Park campus. Abington sponsors 14 NCAA Division III varsity sports that compete in the United East Conference.

== History ==
The Penn State Abington campus was originally developed in the mid-19th century as a private girls' school. This school, initially known as the Chestnut Street Female Seminary, was founded in 1850, when the education of girls began to receive attention and new institutions were established. It was located at two previous sites before this campus was developed. The school was founded by teachers Mary Bonney and Harriette A. Dillaye in Philadelphia, serving girls from the ages of 12 through 18. It had a classical curriculum comparable to that of male seminaries of the time. With increasing enrollment and expansion to lower grades, by 1883 school needed to find a campus that could accommodate the larger student body of nearly 100 students annually.

In 1883, banker Jay Cooke suffered financial hardship and needed a way to pay off his debts. He learned that Bonney and Dillaye were seeking expansion space for their school, which continued to attract new students. He recruited them to lease his mansion in Cheltenham Township, Pennsylvania, outside Philadelphia, for an annual rental of $15,000.

Cooke had his mansion built in 1863. A successful banker, he had helped finance Union operations during the American Civil War. He named his estate Ogontz, in honor of a Native American chief from the Sandusky, Ohio area. During his childhood, Cooke had spent much time with Chief Ogontz and greatly admired the man.

The seminary was renamed as the Ogontz School for Girls after its move that year to Cooke's mansion and estate. Bonney and Dillaye appointed two associate principals, Frances Bennett and Sylvia Eastman, to take on some of the responsibility for operations. The school had about 100 pupils annually.

By 1900, Bennett had retired, and Sylvia Eastman became the sole principal. She encouraged Abby A. Sutherland, the headmistress, to develop her management skills. Later Eastman arranged to sell the school to her for four equal payments. In 1916, Sutherland completed her purchase of The Ogontz School under this agreement. She had worked at the school since 1902, when she was hired as an English teacher. She had already taught for eight years, three of them after graduating from Radcliffe College at Harvard University.

The school continued to attract more students and, in 1916, Sutherland began looking for a larger site. She planned to add lower-school classes for younger girls. She sold the school's property in Cheltenham Township, and bought 54 acres (220,000 m^{2}) of land in what Sutherland called the "beautiful park section in the hills of Rydal." When the school operations were moved to Abington Township, only the main building, known today as the Sutherland Building in her honor, had been completed. Soon after the move, the Rydal School, was constructed on the grounds in order to accommodate additional elementary grades. This structure is known today as the Rydal Building.

In this early twentieth-century period, Amelia Earhart was studying as an upper school student in preparation to attend Bryn Mawr. She was the only alumna in the early years to become internationally known for her own achievements. She established her renown as a solo airplane pilot in the early aviation days, but disappeared in 1937 on an around-the-world flight. Earhart did not graduate from the Ogontz School, leaving months before the ceremony in order to enlist as a nurse's aide at Spadina Military Hospital in Toronto, Ontario, Canada.

=== Penn State Abington ===
Changing mores reduced demand for this all-girls private school. In 1950, Sutherland donated the property and all facilities in Abington to Pennsylvania State University. Furnishings included a painting by Thomas Moran, an American artist to whom Jay Cooke had advanced money in 1873. The campus became a site for some classes of Penn State and was known as Penn State Ogontz, after the private school's best-known name.

In 1995, this facility was renamed as Penn State Abington-Ogontz, to emphasize its relationship with the surrounding community. On July 1, 1997, the Penn State Ogontz campus was designated as a Penn State college and was renamed Penn State Abington.

== Facilities ==
Major campus buildings include the Academic, Sutherland, Lares, and Woodland buildings. Rydal is another of the original Ogontz buildings. Later buildings constructed by Penn State are Springhouse, Cloverly, and Hillcrest. The $68 million, 85,554 square feet Academic Building opened in August 2026 with classrooms, labs, studios, engineering labs, a podcast studio, a photography darkroom and collaborative spaces. A Physical Education building is expected to open September 2027 following a $25 million renovation.

The Sutherland Hall was built in 1915, and served as the original main building for The Ogontz School for Girls. Today it is a classroom building, and features a lecture hall, academic and student offices, academic advising spaces, a post office (cash only), and a tutoring facility. It had an indoor swimming pool but it did not meet current standards and the space was converted for use as a lecture hall. It also had a solarium, an addition adopted from Jay Cooke's mansion Ogontz.

Rydal houses multiple classrooms and the campus security offices. As part of the Ogontz School, it was used for lower-school classes.

The Lares Union Building was built in 1923 as the personal residence of Abby A. Sutherland, president of the Ogontz School. It has been adapted by Penn State Abington to serve as the student union building; its facilities include a cafeteria (managed by Culinart), bookstore (Barnes & Noble college), and a banquet room and multi-purpose room ("Lubert Commons"). It is used for student programs, student organization and government offices, the Office of Student Engagement & Leadership, the Career Development Center, and the Intersection.

The Woodland Building was constructed after the campus became part of Pennsylvania State University. This building features classrooms and a lecture hall, laboratories, a computer lab, and academic offices. It also features Penn State Abington's library, with a collection of nearly 60,000 volumes. The library is available for use by students, faculty, staff, alumni, and residents of the Commonwealth of Pennsylvania.

Springhouse houses a single classroom and storage. The Conference Center has classrooms. Cloverly houses offices and the counseling unit. The Rydal Executive Plaza is owned by Penn State Abington and houses faculty offices, the Abington Launchbox, and a shuttle from the Rydal Station on SEPTA's West Trenton regional rail line. Physical Education houses the athletic department and a gym. Also available are a multi-use field and tennis court (along with nearby facilities – Huntingdon Field) used by the athletic teams.

In 2017, Penn State Abington opened its first on-campus housing nearby, known as Lion's Gate, planned to house roughly 400 freshman. This establishes the campus as residential and not only for commuters. The academic building was recently constructed in 2026, including classrooms, offices and the registrar.

Penn State Abington features a large library, modern laboratories, and computer facilities. Recreational areas include tennis courts, basketball courts, and baseball and soccer fields.

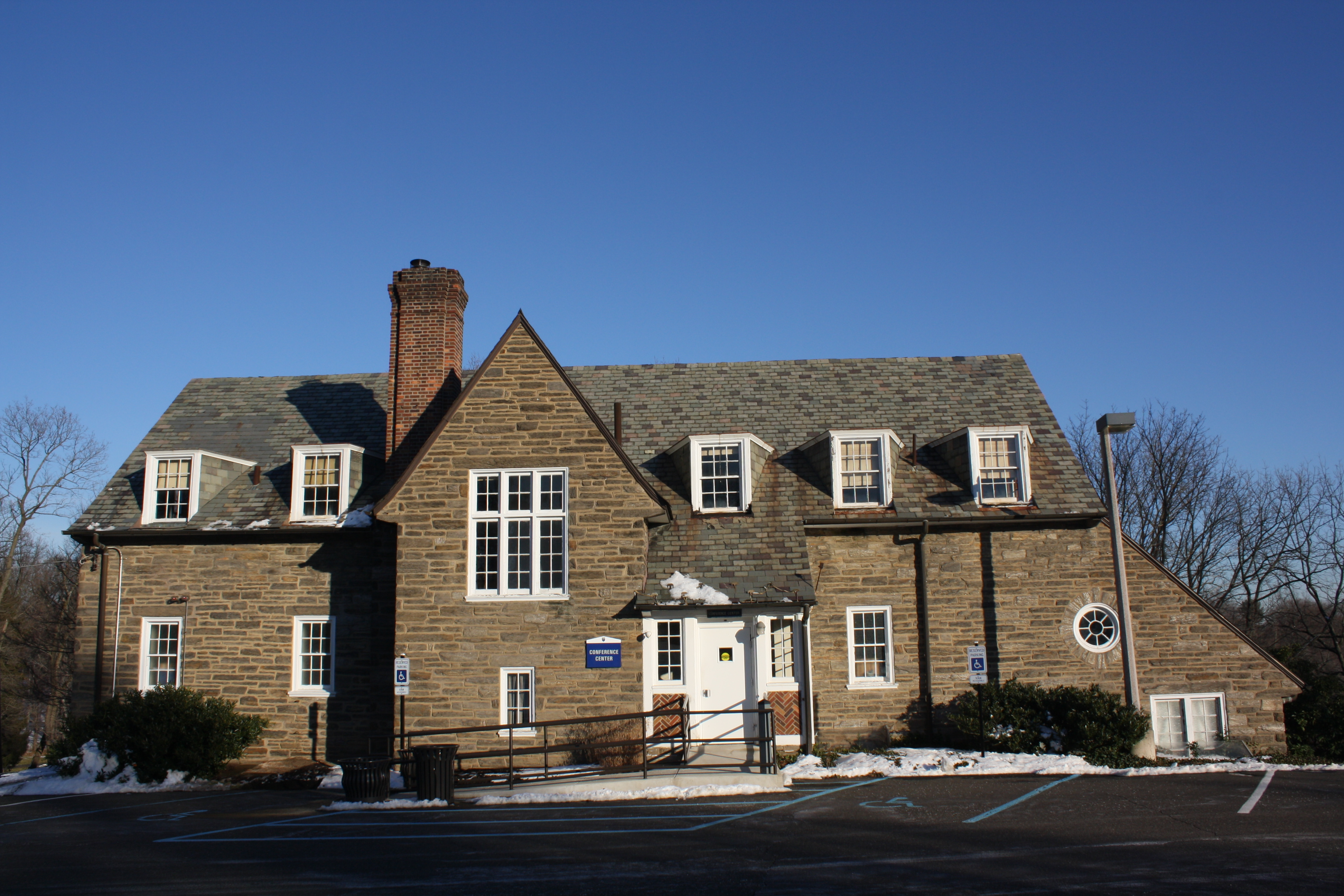
Conference Center

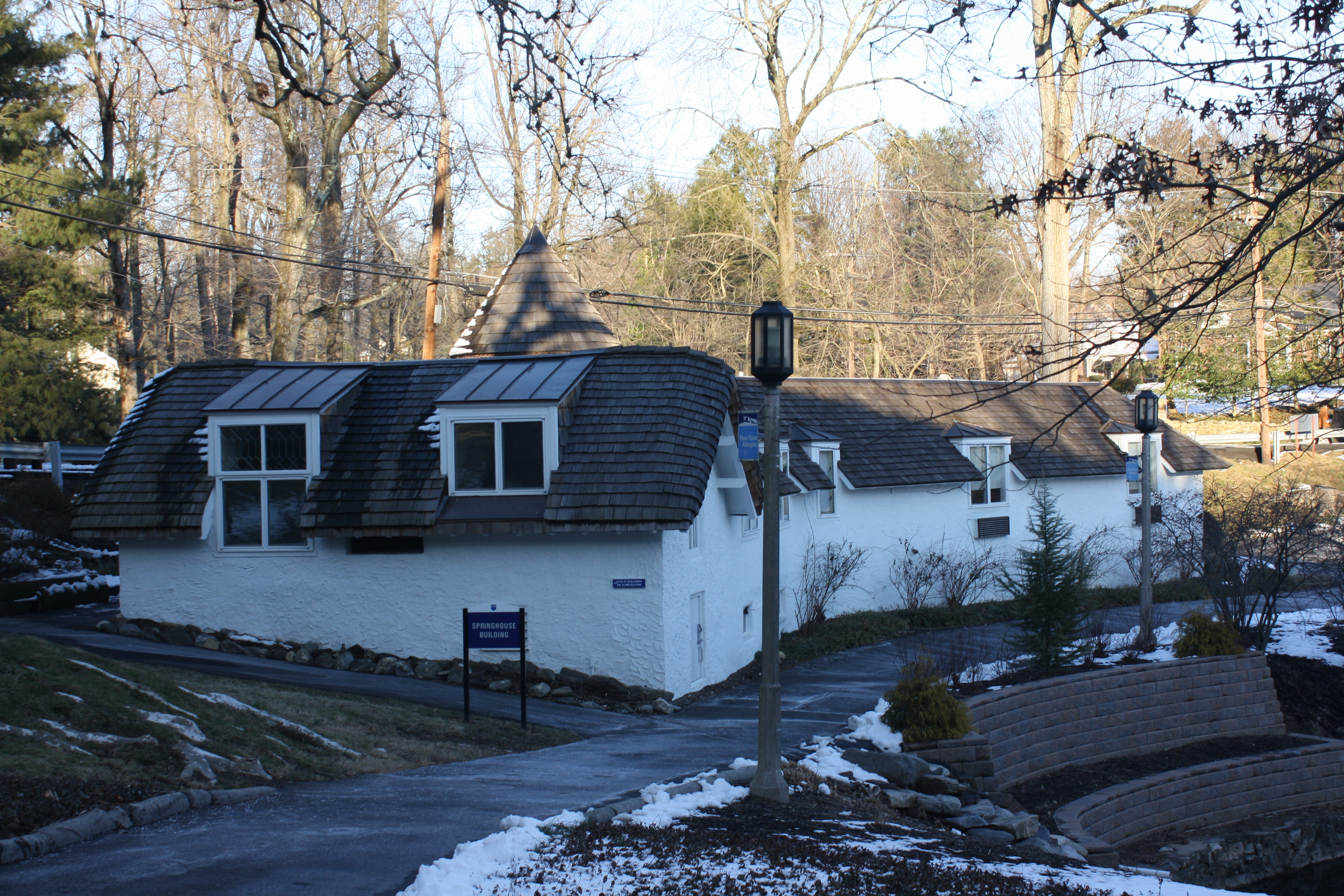
Springhouse

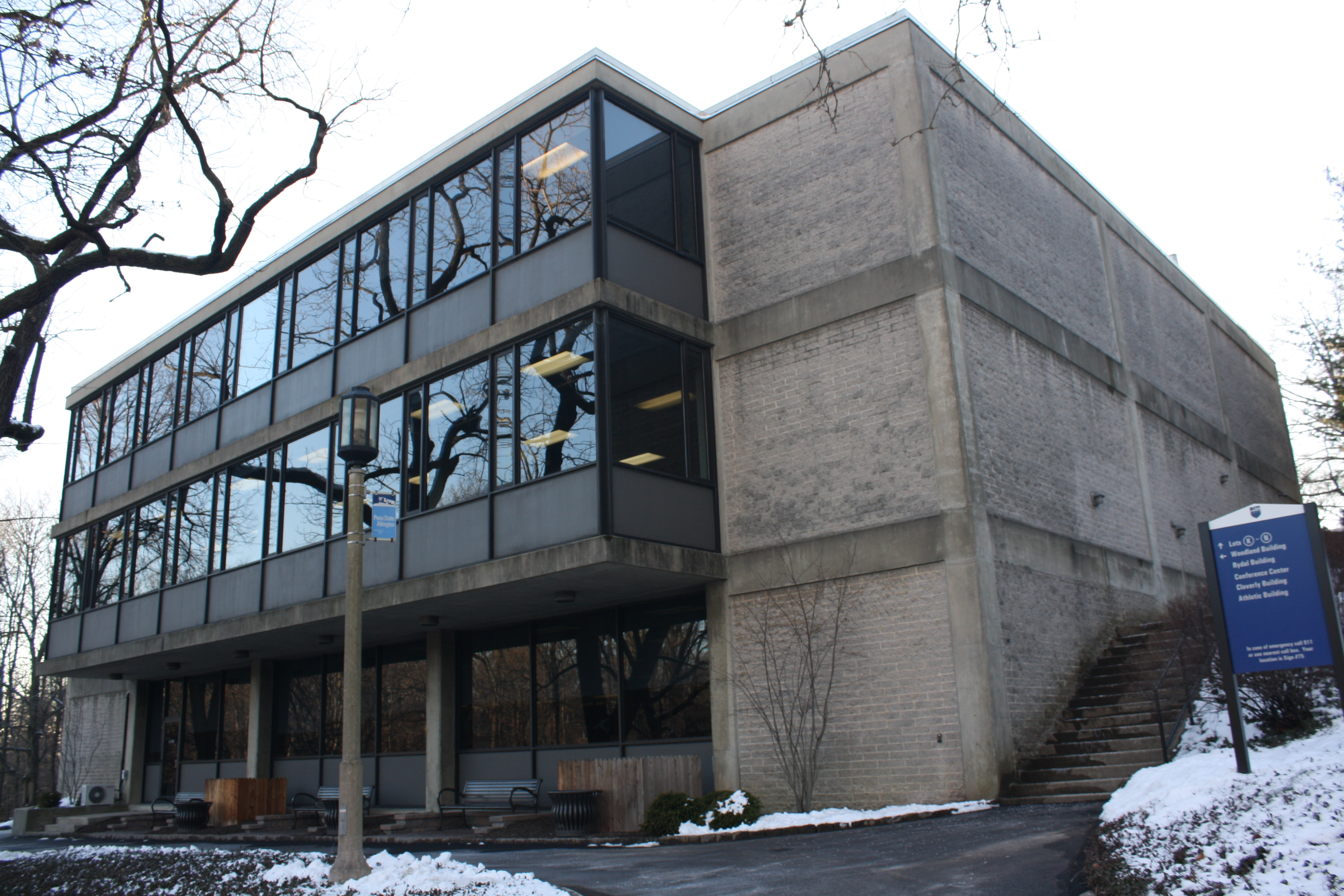
Woodland Building

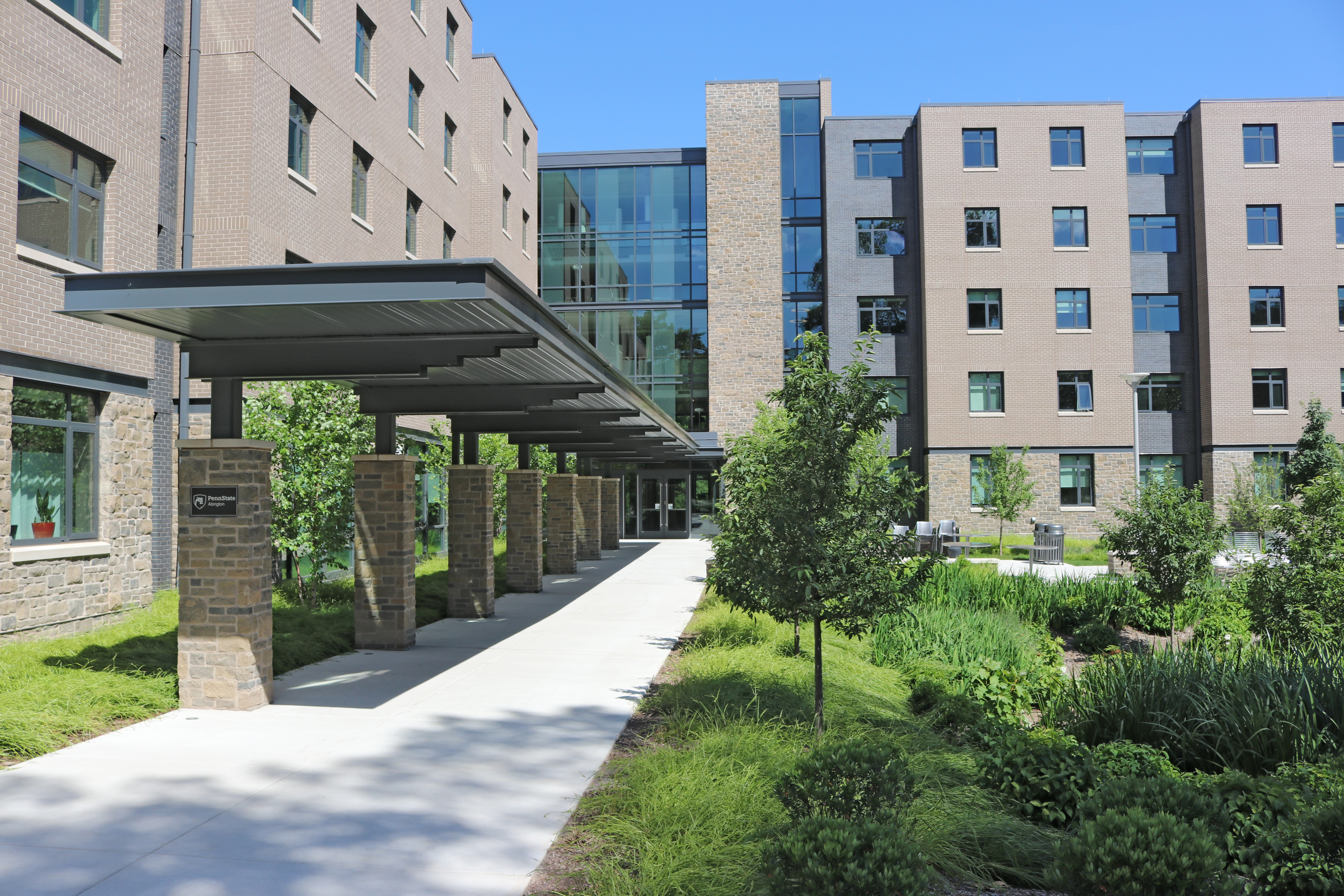
Building in 2018

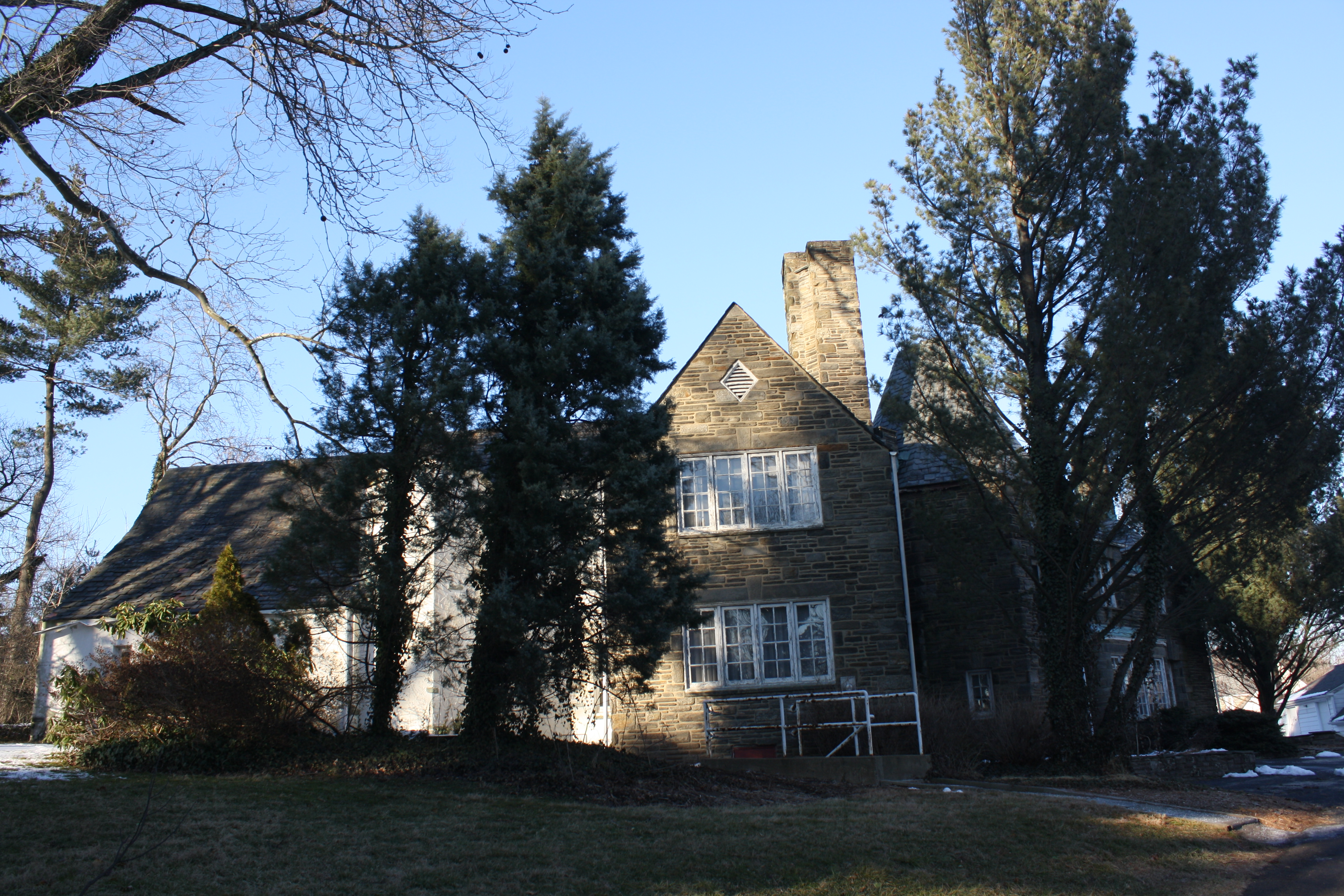
Hillcrest Building

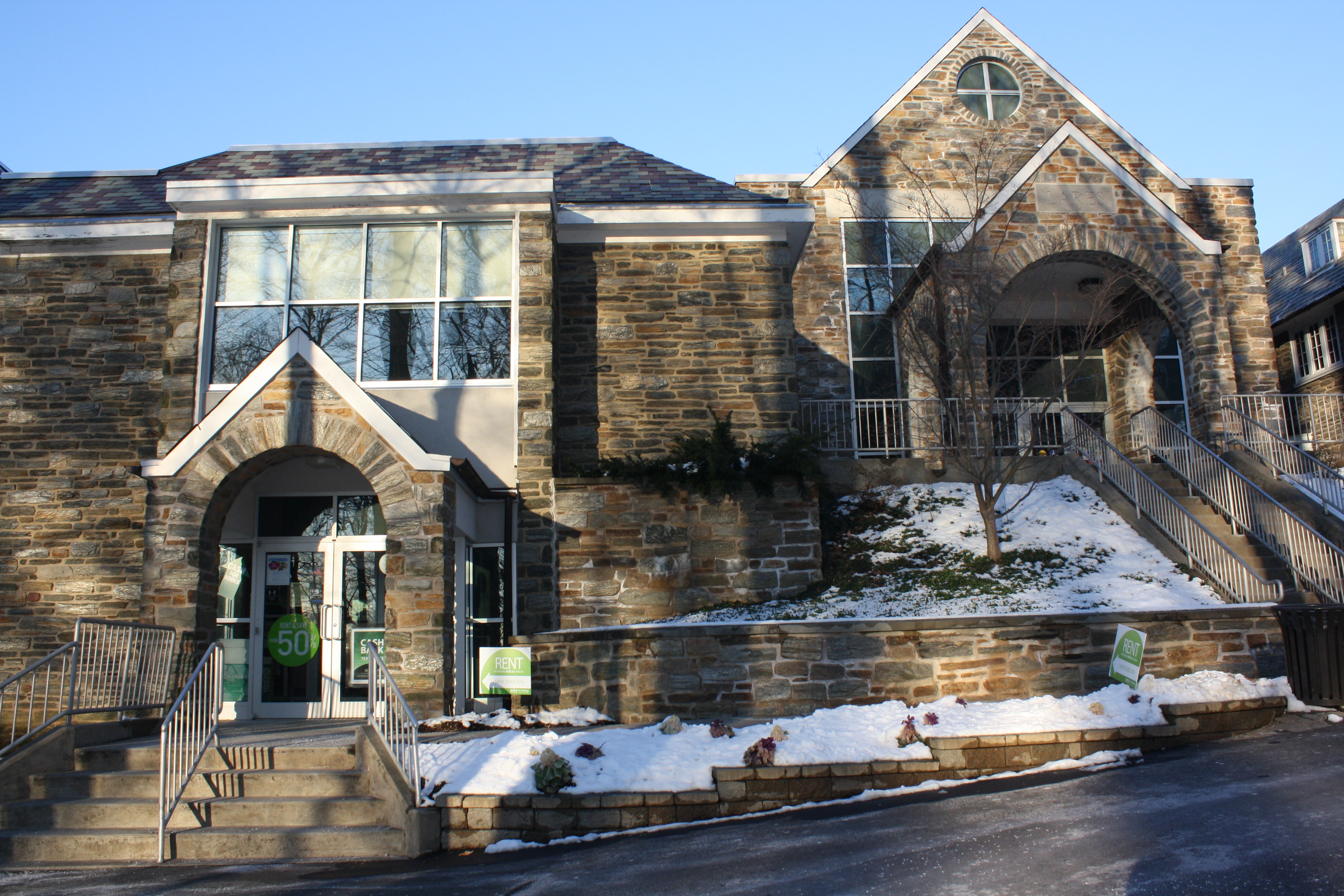
Lares Union Building

== Academics ==
Undergraduate demographics as of Fall 2023
| Race and ethnicity | Total |
|---|---|
| White | 44% |
| Asian | 19% |
| Hispanic | 13% |
| Black | 12% |
| International student | 6% |
| Two or more races | 4% |
| Unknown | 2% |
Economic diversity
| Low-income (Note: The percentage of students who received an income-based federal Pell grant intended for low-income students.) | 40% |
| Affluent (Note: The percentage of students who are a part of the American middle class at the bare minimum.) | 60% |

Penn State Abington offers students leadership development, faculty-led research projects, support for internships, and affordable short-term travel opportunities through the Abington Experience.

The college offers twenty-five bachelor's degree programss at Abington and two associate degree programs. Students can work towards a master's degree at collaborating universities while pursuing an undergraduate degree at Abington through pathway programs.

== Athletics ==
Penn State Abington athletics wordmark

Penn State Abington, known athletically as the Nittany Lions, is a full member of the NCAA Division III and participates in the United East Conference.

Penn State Abington sponsors 14 intercollegiate sports. Men's sports include baseball, basketball, cross country, golf, soccer, tennis and track and field; while women's sports include basketball, cross country, soccer, softball, tennis, track and field, and volleyball.
