= Penn State Beaver =

Public university in Center Township, Pennsylvania, US

Coordinates: 40.67753°N 80.29359°W

- Type: Public satellite campus
- Established: 1965
- Parent institution: Pennsylvania State University
- Chancellor: Carey McDougall
- President: Neeli Bendapudi
- Faculty: 200+ full-time and part-time
- Students: 475 (Fall 2025)
- Undergraduates: 475 (Fall 2025)
- Location: Center Township, Beaver County, Pennsylvania, U.S.
- Colors: Blue & White
- Sporting affiliations: PSUAC (USCAA)
- Mascot: Nittany Lion
- Website: beaver.psu.edu/

Penn State Beaver is a commonwealth campus of Pennsylvania State University located in Center Township, Beaver County, Pennsylvania.

== Campus history ==
The land where the campus now exists was once a farm owned by the Hartenbach family. The barn once stood on the present site of the Brodhead Cultural Center's amphitheater. The main part of the campus’s grounds has served multiple purposes throughout the years. One of its main functions was as the Beaver County Tuberculosis Sanatorium, which opened on February 14, 1923. The building, which later served as the Penn State Beaver administration building from 1965 until 2004 when the Ross Administration Building was opened, held 20 beds and its primary physicians were Drs Fred and Ruth Wilson.

As tuberculosis cases began to decline in the Beaver County area the sanatorium was closed in the early 1950s. For a short time after this, the building was used as an annex for the Beaver County Geriatric Hospital before it was moved to its new location on Dutch Ridge Road in 1963. It was also around this time that Hartenbach farm was sold to Pennsylvania State University with a contingent that Ralph Hartenbach and his wife could live in their house until their deaths.

The Beaver County Commissioners donated the old sanatorium and the land around it to Penn State. In the fall of 1965, Penn State Beaver admitted 97 students for its first semester. Each student paid $525 for two semesters.

== Academics ==
Undergraduate demographics as of Fall 2023
Race and ethnicity	Total
White	70%
Black	9%
Hispanic	7%
Asian	5%
Two or more races	5%
International student	3%
Unknown	1%
Economic diversity
Low-income (Note: The percentage of students who received an income-based federal Pell grant intended for low-income students.)	35%
Affluent (Note: The percentage of students who are a part of the American middle class at the bare minimum.)	65%

Penn State Beaver offers the first two years of almost all of Penn State's more than 160 baccalaureate majors. Students can also complete many bachelor's degrees at Beaver campus.

== Campus buildings ==
=== Library (LIB) ===
Opened in 1968, the library was a part of the first campus building project after Penn state Beaver opened in 1965. The building now houses over 40,000 books and students are able to also check out DVDs and CDs. The Library Information Access System (LIAS) and CAT (Penn State’s card catalogue system) can also be accessed from the computers located in the building as well as from any computer with internet access. Through these systems, students can access any book in the Penn State Library system as well as books from other colleges and universities. Located in the downstairs of the building is a classroom and study.

=== Michael Baker Jr. Science and Engineering Building (MBB) ===
Also, opened in 1968 this building was formally called the Science and Engineering Building but was later renamed after Baker’s Death. Baker was the founder of the Michael Baker Corporation. Baker had played a key role in bring Penn State to Beaver County and was a Penn State Alumnus. Both the main IST and Engineering labs are housed in this building. The IST lab was developed with a $125,000 grant from the Beaver County Commissioners. In the downstairs of the building is the Digital Commons, a multimedia studio open to students staff and faculty.

=== General Classroom Building (GCB) ===
The third of the buildings opened in 1968, the GCB features two auditorium classrooms as well as other additional classrooms that serve a variety of classes.

=== Harmony Hall ===
Completed in the late 1960s, the building is still home to campus residents. Each dorm features a micro fridge and internet access. A game room and Laundry room are available in the basement of the building.

=== Brodhead Bistro ===
Open during the fall and spring semesters, the Brodhead Bistro offers a variety of food choices to students on campus.

=== Student Union (SUB) ===
The first part of the building was completed in 1970. In 1994, the building was expanded. It now includes the auditorium as well as the campus Admissions Office, Student Affairs, The Student Activity Suite, Housing and Food Services, Special Events room, the campus bookstore, and Career Services. The Student Union Lodge, WBVR radio station and the game room are also located in this building. Conference rooms are located in the downstairs of the building for both university and outside use.

=== Gary B. Keefer Wellness Center and Gymnasium ===
The original gymnasium for the campus was constructed in 1970. In 2012, the gym saw the addition of the Gary B. Keefer Wellness Center, a fitness center containing various exercise equipment.

=== Ross Administration Building (RAB) ===
The administration building replaced the old sanitorium that was located in the center of campus. This building houses academic affairs, the chancellor’s office, the business and finance office, the division of undergraduate studies, the health center, the Center for Academic Achievement and most professors’ offices.

== Athletics ==
=== Varsity sports ===
Penn State–Beaver currently offers seven varsity sports teams:

- Men's Basketball
- Men's Baseball
- Men's Soccer
- Women's Basketball
- Women's Soccer
- Women's Softball
- Women's Volleyball

In addition, the campus has one club sport: hockey.

Penn State Beaver Athletics is a member of the Pennsylvania State University Athletic Conference (PSUAC) and the United States Collegiate Athletic Association (USCAA). Since 2006, Beaver teams have won the following championships:

- 2 USCAA national championships
- 2 USCAA national runners-up
- 6 USCAA top 5 finishes
- 2 PSUAC championships
- 19 PSUAC runners-up
- 2 WPACRHL championships (club hockey league)
- 3 WPACRHL runners-up

=== Intramural sports ===
For students interested in playing a sport but not wanting to join a varsity team, various intramural leagues and activities are held throughout the academic year.

== Campus events ==
=== Homecoming ===
Homecoming is held annually during the fall semester. The event is typically held on a Saturday when a carnival and tailgate party is held. Various athletic games of alumni vs students are also held.

=== Beaverfest ===
BeaverFest Week, which is sponsored by the Student Government Association, features a series of programs and events for Beaver students with free food, giveaways, prizes and T-shirts. Beaverfest is held annually during the last week of classes for the spring semester.
