= Penn State Scranton =

Public university in Dunmore, Pennsylvania, US

Coordinates: 41.439445°N 75.623027°W

- Type: Public
- Established: 1923
- Parent institution: Pennsylvania State University
- Affiliations: PSUAC (USCAA)
- Chancellor: Menah Pratt
- President: Neeli Bendapudi
- Faculty: 108
- Students: 744 (Fall 2025)
- Undergraduates: 739 (Fall 2025)
- Postgraduates: 5 (Fall 2025)
- Location: Dunmore, Pennsylvania, U.S.
- Colors: Blue and White
- Mascot: Nittany Lion
- Website: scranton.psu.edu/

Penn State Scranton (formerly known as Penn State Worthington Scranton) is a Commonwealth Campus of Pennsylvania State University located in Dunmore, Pennsylvania. The Scranton campus was named in memory of Worthington Scranton, a prominent industrialist and civic leader of Northeastern Pennsylvania.

== History ==
In 1923, Pennsylvania State College (not yet a university) established a branch school in Scranton, offering evening technical institute programs. The school was renamed the Scranton Center in 1951 and became part of the General Extension division of the Penn State. In 1953, its courses were restructured as associate degree programs. The school left its first home at the Longfellow School Annex in Scranton in June 1968 and moved to the present site which was purchased with money raised through contributions from private citizens and local industries. The new campus opened in September 1968 as a member of Penn State's Commonwealth Campus System. The first campus baccalaureate degree program was offered in 1995 and on July 1, 1997, Scranton joined 11 other Penn State locations as a campus of the University's Commonwealth College. The name change to Penn State Scranton became effective on May 1, 2018.

== Athletics ==
Undergraduate demographics as of Fall 2023
Race and ethnicity	Total
White	67%
Hispanic	12%
Asian	10%
Black	6%
Two or more races	3%
Unknown	1%
Economic diversity
Low-income (Note: The percentage of students who received an income-based federal Pell grant intended for low-income students.)	45%
Affluent (Note: The percentage of students who are a part of the American middle class at the bare minimum.)	55%

Penn State Scranton teams participate as a member of the United States Collegiate Athletic Association (USCAA). The Nittany Lions are a member of the Pennsylvania State University Athletic Conference (PSUAC). Men's sports include baseball, basketball, cross country and soccer; while women's sports include basketball, cross country, softball and volleyball.
