= Penn State Schuylkill =

Public university in Schuylkill Haven, Pennsylvania, US

- Type: Public satellite campus
- Established: 1934
- Parent institution: Pennsylvania State University
- Chancellor: Cory R. Scherer (interim)
- President: Neeli Bendapudi
- Faculty: 50 full-time
- Students: 653 (Fall 2025)
- Undergraduates: 653 (Fall 2025)
- Location: North Manheim Township, Pennsylvania, U.S.
- Colors: Navy Blue and White
- Nickname: Nittany Lions
- Sporting affiliations: USCAA – PSUAC
- Website: schuylkill.psu.edu

Penn State Schuylkill is a Commonwealth Campus of the Pennsylvania State University in North Manheim Township, Pennsylvania.

== History ==
=== 20th century ===
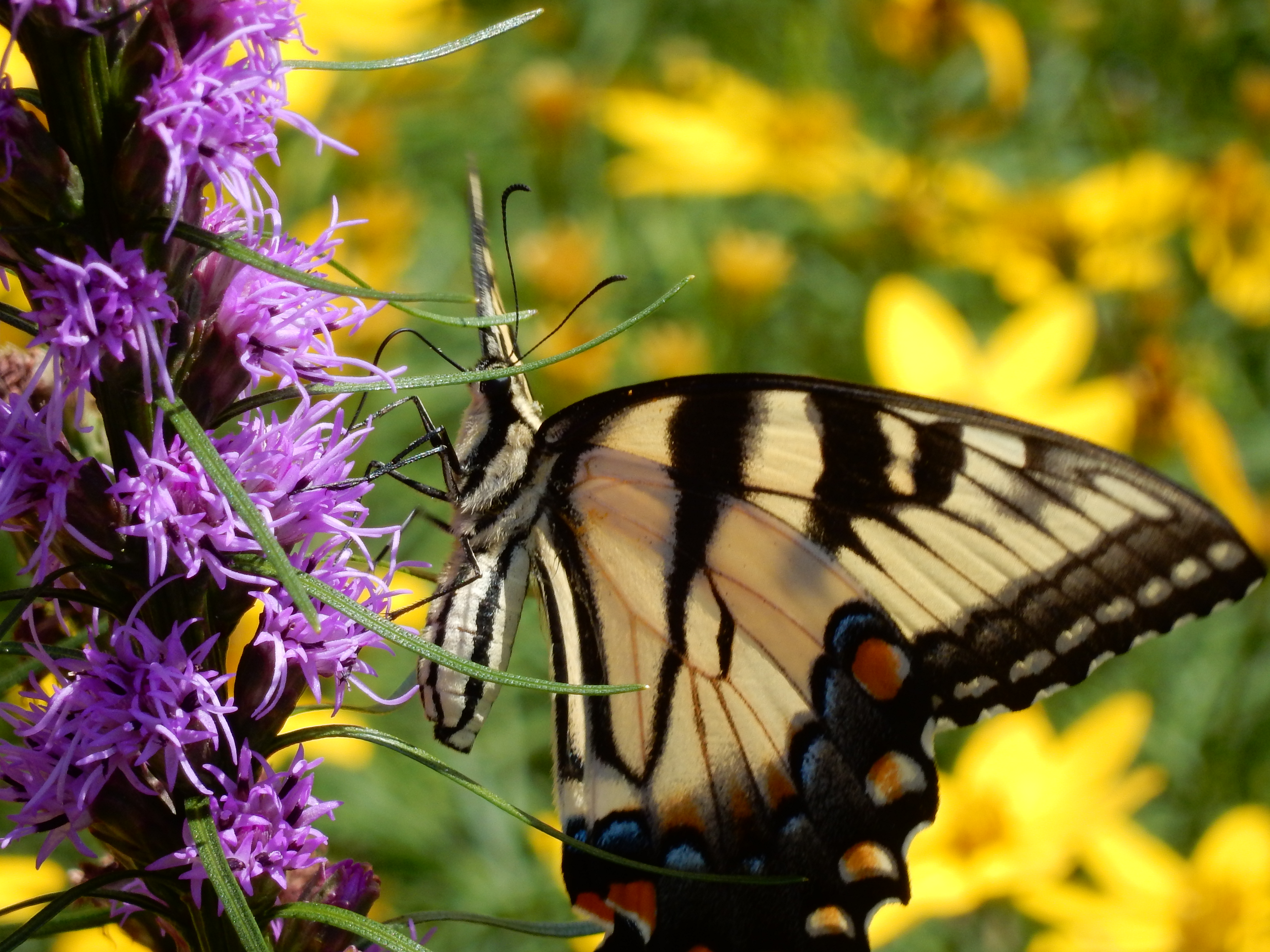
The Penn State Schuylkill certified pollinator-friendly garden, which boasts native plants to promote pollinator health

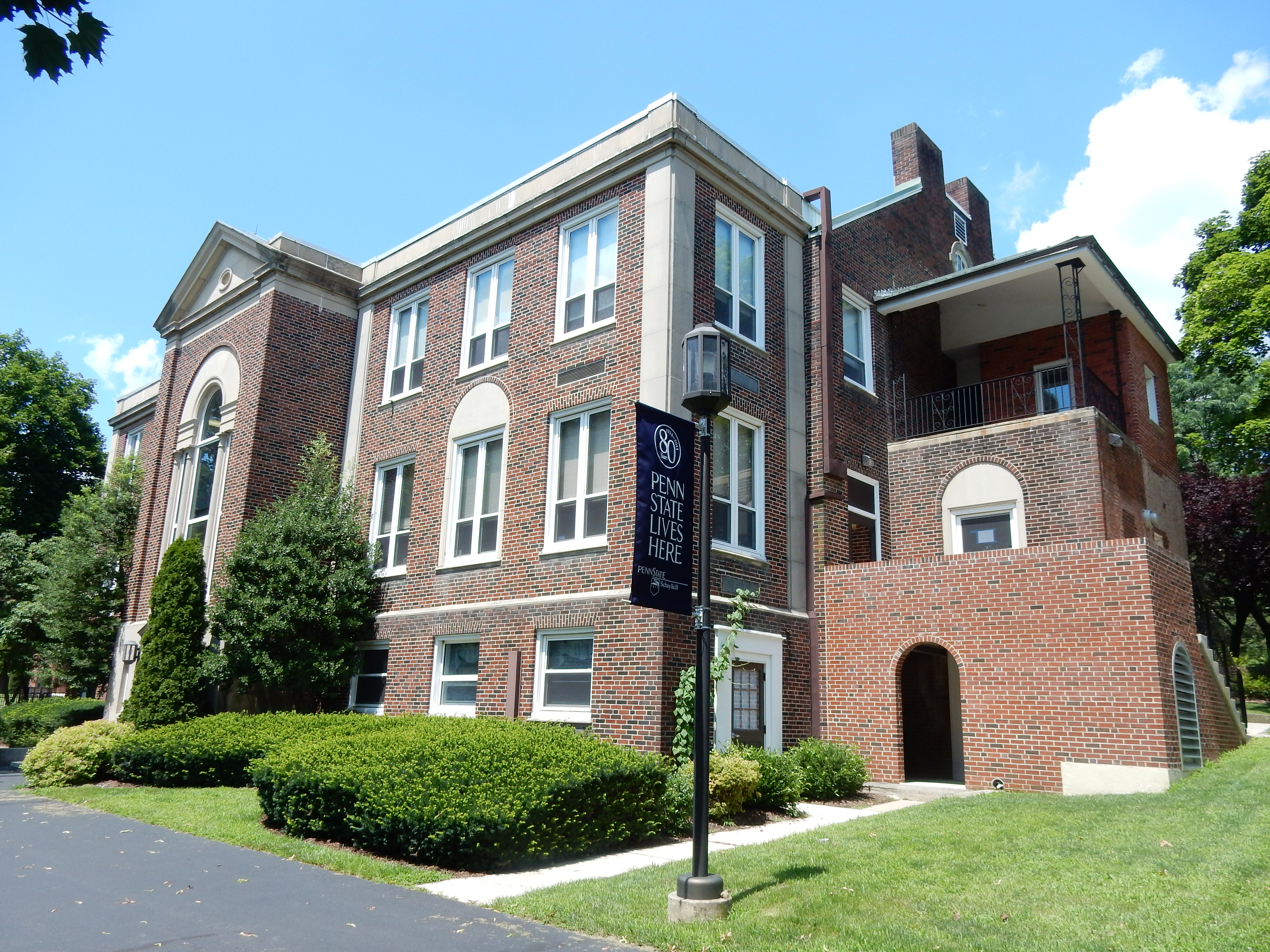
The Administration Building at Penn State Schuylkill, which houses the Office of Admissions, the Office of Academic Affairs, numerous classrooms, faculty offices, police services, ID services, and the Office of Continuing Education

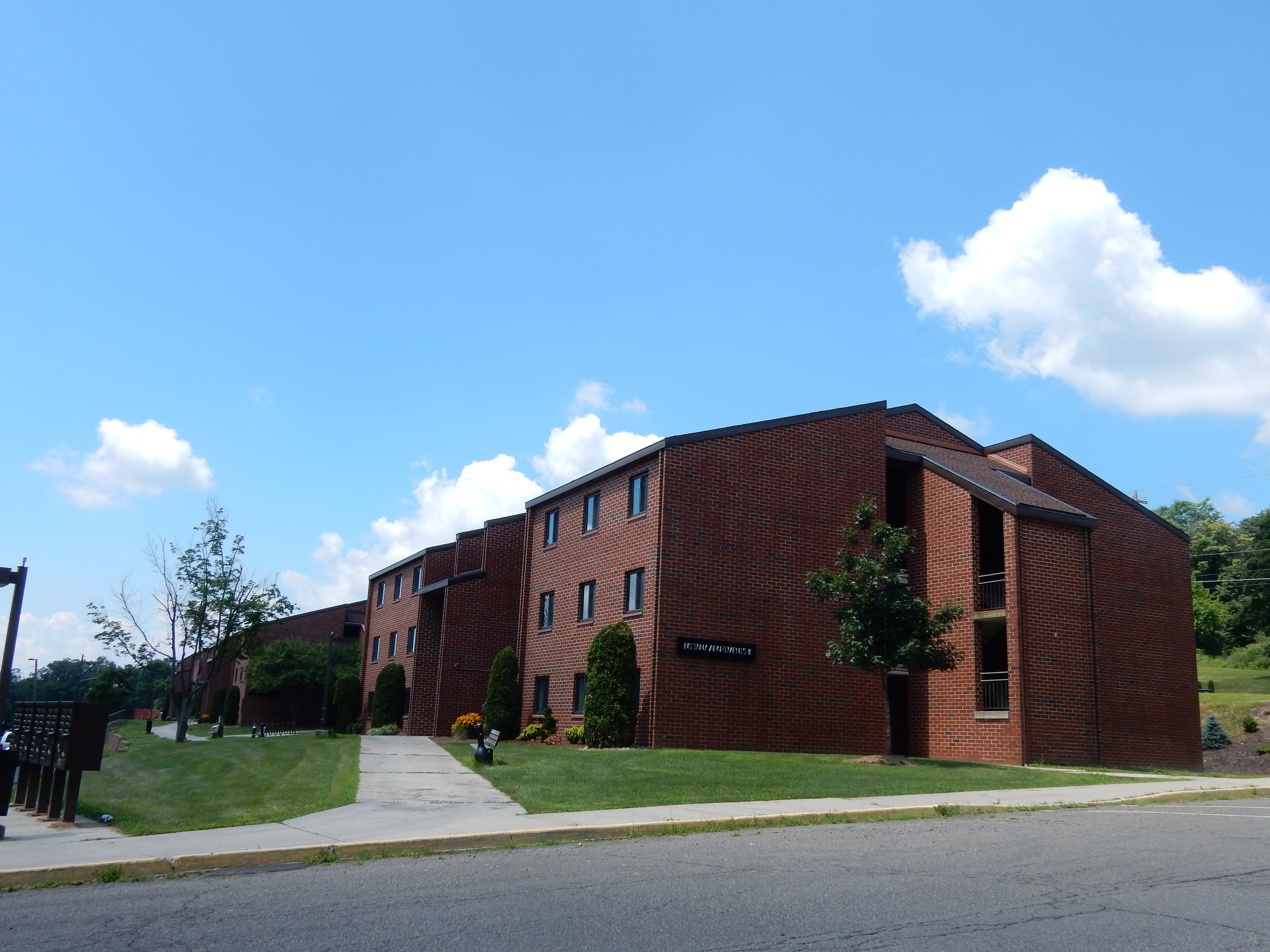
The Nittany Apartments at Penn State Schuylkill, which features suites with two to three double-occupancy bedrooms, two full bathrooms, and a fully equipped kitchen

The Schuylkill campus was originally chartered in 1934 and was located in Pottsville, approximately six miles (10 km) north of the current campus. Classes were originally held in rented space, and laboratory facilities for science students were shared with an area high school. After World War II, the college began to grow, and in 1953, they began offering their first full associate degree programs. In the 1960s, the nearly 500 student body was outgrowing its Pottsville facilities, and the college looked to relocate. In 1967, the campus was relocated to a 39-acre tract of land just outside of Schuylkill Haven, former site of the county almshouse.

The campus saw continued growth during the 1970s, including expanding infrastructure and the addition of new academic programs and activities. In the fall of 1970 a new associate degree program in the burgeoning field of Computer Science was added to the curriculum. Penn State Schuylkill continued to keep up with emerging technology throughout that decade and into the next with academic programming designed to meet the needs of students and the surrounding community.

In the early 1990s, the campus' first baccalaureate degree students began to graduate and the capital campaign for the new library initiated at the end of the previous decade bore fruit when the 22,600 square foot Ciletti Memorial Library opened in December 1994.

=== 21st century ===
Throughout the 2000s, Penn State Schuylkill continued to grow to meet the educational needs of 21st century students. The campus administers a $1 million scholarship endowment, and with over 90% of students receiving some form of financial assistance, Penn State Schuylkill continues its tradition of helping to make a Penn State education affordable and attainable.

In fall 2017, Washington Monthly named Penn State Schuylkill a Top 25 Northeast College for value ("Best Bang for the Buck"), and the best value public university in the Pennsylvania.

== Academics ==
Undergraduate demographics as of Fall 2023
Race and ethnicity	Total
White	69%
Black	13%
Hispanic	10%
Asian	3%
Two or more races	2%
International student	1%
Unknown	1%
Economic diversity
Low-income (Note: The percentage of students who received an income-based federal Pell grant intended for low-income students.)	43%
Affluent (Note: The percentage of students who are a part of the American middle class at the bare minimum.)	57%

Penn State Schuylkill offers ten baccalaureate and four associate degrees as well as nine academic minors. Students also have the option to participate in the 2+2 degree plan, where they can begin any of 275+ majors at the Schuylkill campus and complete the remainder of their degree at another Penn State campus, including University Park.

== Athletics ==
The Penn State–Schuylkill athletic teams are called the Nittany Lions. The Nittany Lions compete as a member of the United States Collegiate Athletic Association (USCAA), primarily competing in the Pennsylvania State University Athletic Conference (PSUAC) since the 2008–09 academic year. The Nittany Lions also compete as a member of the Eastern College Athletic Conference (ECAC), being the first non-NCAA institution to gain membership, following their admission in the 2024–25 academic year. It also competes in the NCAA Division III Atlantic East Conference as an associate member in women's flag football.

The Nittany Lions are former members of the National Association of Intercollegiate Athletics (NAIA), having primarily competed as an NAIA Independent within the Continental Athletic Conference after their entry during the 2018–19 academic year. While there has been no formal confirmation from the school regarding their exit, they are no longer shown as a member when searching the NAIA's interactive member directory by their zip code (17972), and are no longer listed under members from Pennsylvania.

Penn State Schuylkill competes in 12 intercollegiate varsity sports. Men's sports include baseball, basketball, cross country and track & field. Women's sports include basketball, cross country, flag football, soccer, softball, track & field, and volleyball. Golf is sponsored for both sexes.
