= Penn State DuBois =

Public college in DuBois, Pennsylvania, US

Coordinates: 41.127268°N 78.751545°W

- Type: Public satellite campus
- Established: 1935
- Parent institution: Pennsylvania State University
- Affiliations: PSUAC (USCAA)
- Chancellor: Dr. Jungwoo Ryoo
- President: Neeli Bendapudi
- Faculty: 39 full-time
- Students: 375 (Fall 2025)
- Undergraduates: 375 (Fall 2025)
- Location: DuBois, Pennsylvania, U.S.
- Campus: DuBois Campus
- Colors: Navy Blue and White
- Mascot: Nittany Lion
- Website: dubois.psu.edu/

Penn State DuBois is a commonwealth campus of the Pennsylvania State University and it is located in DuBois, Pennsylvania. The campus was established in 1935, but in May 2025 Penn State officials announced it would close after the Spring 2027 semester, citing low enrollment and financial losses.

== History ==
Founded as the DuBois Center of the Pennsylvania State College in 1935, the first classes were held in the Hubert Street School by four full-time and one part-time faculty. In 1937, the DuBois School Board and the family of city founder John E. DuBois endowed the center with a four-acre campus including the original DuBois family mansion and stables. Extensive renovations were carried out on the Tudor-style mansion and grounds by the Works Progress Administration, and classes began in "The Mansion" February 1938. In 1942, the curriculum of standard undergraduate courses was expanded to include a summer semester "Accelerated Program" and evening adult classes to train defense specialists for the World War II War Effort.

In 1945, the DuBois Educational Foundation was incorporated to raise funds for campus growth. Following World War II, an influx of GI Bill veterans increased the student body, and throughout the next decades several new buildings were constructed to accommodate the continued growth. In 1959, the Pennsylvania State University formally integrated its "Centers" as "Commonwealth Campuses" and the "DuBois Undergraduate Center" officially became the DuBois Campus. Penn State DuBois serves the higher educational needs of the relatively rural surrounding area, and is an important educational resource for the entire DuBois region, including Clearfield, Jefferson and Elk Counties.

=== Closure ===
On May 22, 2025 the Board of Trustees of Pennsylvania State University announced the closure of seven of its twenty regional Commonwealth campuses, including Penn State DuBois. Enrollment had dropped to 385 students as of Fall 2024, a 60% decline since 2008 when the campus had its peak of 963 students, and 46% in the past ten years. There was one other college within 30 miles (48 km) of the campus, which only had commuter students. In fiscal 2024, financial losses for the campus were just over $4 million, and the campus has $25.7 million in deferred maintenance (or $67,000 per student). Penn State DuBois will close after the Spring 2027 semester.

== Academics ==
Currently serving 600 students, Penn State DuBois offers 8 associate and 6 bachelor's degree programs which can be completed entirely on site. The first two years of an additional 160 majors can be started at DuBois, with students matriculating to the Penn State University Park Campus to complete their degrees. All Penn State academic programs, credits and degrees are accredited by the Middle States Commission on Higher Education.

== Campus life ==
Undergraduate demographics as of Fall 2023
Race and ethnicity	Total
White	93%
Black	2%
Asian	1%
Two or more races	1%
Economic diversity
Low-income (Note: The percentage of students who received an income-based federal Pell grant intended for low-income students.)	30%
Affluent (Note: The percentage of students who are a part of the American middle class at the bare minimum.)	70%

Penn State DuBois Campus Nittany Lion on Quad

The university does not maintain any residence halls on the DuBois campus. Students from the area generally live at home and commute, or reside in apartments in the surrounding communities. The Lions' Den Cafe is open daily from 8 am to 4 pm for student use, and serves hot lunches daily, Monday-Friday when classes are in session. There are many co-curricular activity opportunities for students both on campus and in the community.

== Athletics ==
Penn State–DuBois athletic teams participate as members of the United States Collegiate Athletic Association (USCAA). The Nittany Lions are a member of the Pennsylvania State University Athletic Conference (PSUAC). Men's sports include baseball, basketball, cross country and wrestling; while women's sports include basketball, cross country, softball and volleyball. Co-Ed Golf.
