= Pennsylvania State University Commonwealth Campuses =

University campuses in Pennsylvania

Locations of the main campus and Commonwealth Campuses

The Pennsylvania State University is a geographically-dispersed public university with facilities located across Pennsylvania. While the central administration of the university is located on its main campus at Penn State University Park, there are 20 Commonwealth Campuses in other locations within the state, which together enroll roughly 20,000 of Penn State's 83,000 students, or about 24 percent.

Every Commonwealth Campus is considered part of the Pennsylvania State University, and graduates from the Commonwealth Campuses receive the same Penn State degree. As some majors are only available on certain campuses, students have the option to transfer to another Commonwealth Campus or University Park to complete their degree after two years at their original campus. The first two years of most Penn State majors can be completed on any campus.

== Administration ==
The 20 Commonwealth Campuses are overseen by the Penn State Office of the Vice President for Commonwealth Campuses. This office oversees Penn State Great Valley (a special-mission graduate school) and six academic colleges – five "campus colleges" (Abington, Altoona, Berks, Erie, Harrisburg) and the University College. The remaining 14 campuses comprise the University College.

The position of VP for Commonwealth Campuses was established in 2005, and is held by Renata S. Engel as of 2026. Each campus is headed by a chancellor or campus director, and the University College is headed by a dean. The chancellors of the five campus colleges report directly to the VP, while chancellors of the University College campuses report to the dean of University College, John Nauright.

== List of Commonwealth Campuses ==
Campuses in italics are slated for closure in 2027.

Campus	Location	Enrollment (Fall 2026)	Established	Athletics		
Campus	Location	Enrollment (Fall 2026)	Established	Nickname	Primary affiliation	Primary conference
Penn State Abington (Note: Formerly known as Penn State Ogontz.)	Abington	2,485	1950	Nittany Lions	NCAA Division III	United East (UEC)
Penn State Altoona	Logan Township	2,153	1939	Nittany Lions	NCAA Division III	Allegheny Mountain (AMCC)
Penn State Beaver	Monaca	421	1965	Nittany Lions	USCAA	Penn State (PSUAC)
Penn State Berks	Spring Township	1,580	1958	Nittany Lions	NCAA Division III	United East (UEC)
Penn State Brandywine (Note: Formerly known as Penn State Delaware County.)	Media	909	1967	Nittany Lions	NCAA Division III	United East (UEC)
Penn State DuBois	DuBois	189	1935	Nittany Lions	USCAA	Penn State (PSUAC)
Penn State Erie, The Behrend College	Erie	3,182	1948	Lions	NCAA Division III	Allegheny Mountain (AMCC)
Penn State Fayette	Uniontown	173	1934	Roaring Lions	USCAA	Penn State (PSUAC)
Penn State Great Valley	Malvern	146	1963	None		
Penn State Greater Allegheny (Note: Formerly known as Penn State McKeesport.)	McKeesport	320	1948	Lions	USCAA	Penn State (PSUAC)
Penn State Harrisburg, The Capital College	Middletown	4,458	1966	Lions	NCAA Division III	United East (UEC)
Penn State Hazleton	Hazleton	519	1934	Nittany Lions	USCAA	Penn State (PSUAC)
Penn State Lehigh Valley	Center Valley	970	1912	Nittany Lions	USCAA	Penn State (PSUAC)
Penn State Mont Alto	Mont Alto	281	1903	Nittany Lions	USCAA	Penn State (PSUAC)
Penn State New Kensington	New Kensington	161	1958	Nittany Lions	Athletics suspended, formerly PSUAC	
Penn State Schuylkill	Schuylkill Haven	673	1934	Nittany Lions	USCAA	Penn State (PSUAC)
Penn State Scranton (Note: Formerly known as Penn State Worthington Scranton.)	Dunmore	714	1923	Nittany Lions	USCAA	Penn State (PSUAC)
Penn State Shenango (Note: Formerly known as Penn State Shenango Valley.)	Sharon	138	1965	Lions	USCAA	Penn State (PSUAC)
Penn State Wilkes-Barre	Lehman	99	1916	Nittany Lions	Athletics suspended, formerly PSUAC	
Penn State York	York	262	1926	Nittany Lions	USCAA	Penn State (PSUAC)

== Campus closures ==
In a message to the Penn State community on February 25, 2025, President Neeli Bendapudi stated: "We cannot continue with business as usual ... declining enrollments, demographic shifts and financial pressures ... require us to make difficult choices. ... It has become clear that we cannot sustain a viable Commonwealth Campus ecosystem without closing some campuses." She formed a working group to recommend a future for the Commonwealth Campuses. The group published on May 13 a recommendation that seven Penn State Commonwealth Campuses – DuBois, Fayette, Mont Alto, New Kensington, Shenango, Wilkes-Barre, and York – "close after a two-year wind down".

On May 22, 2025, the Penn State Board of Trustees voted to close the seven campuses, citing declining enrollments and financial losses. They are slated to close at the end of the 2026–2027 academic year. The closures resulted from a review of 12 campuses for possible closure. The dozen campuses reviewed included the seven chosen as well as Greater Allegheny, Beaver, Hazleton, Schuylkill, and Scranton, which will remain open. When the list of seven campuses recommended for closure leaked on May 12, the university released its 143-page report the next day.

The report to the trustees cited "enrollment and financial decline ... and significant maintenance backlog" as justifications for the closures, adding that estimated future costs for the seven campuses included "$19 million in annual financial support, $21 million in annual overhead expenses, and more than $200 million in future facilities investment". It noted that the seven campuses "currently enroll 3.6% of Penn State's students and employ 3.4% of Penn State's faculty and 2.2% of Penn State's staff." A Philadelphia Inquirer analysis of the campuses chosen for closure found that only Mont Alto offered housing, and its residential occupancy rate of 40% was the lowest of the all campuses offering residence halls. Enrollments at the seven had dropped between 51% and 68% from their peaks, and between 37% and 43% in the preceding decade. The seven campuses had lost a total of $19.3 million in that fiscal year. Looking at the 12 campuses reviewed, five of the seven which will close had the lowest fractions of students who were Pell Grant eligible, and five of seven also had the lowest share of "underrepresented groups".

== See also ==
- Commonwealth System of Higher Education – state-related university system that includes Penn State
