= Penn State York =

Public college in Spring Garden Township, Pennsylvania

Coordinates: 39.953446°N 76.705524°W

- Type: Public satellite campus
- Parent institution: Pennsylvania State University
- Affiliations: PSUAC (USCAA)
- Chancellor: Marilyn Wells
- President: Neeli Bendapudi
- Faculty: 97 full-time and adjunct faculty
- Students: 625 (Fall 2025)
- Undergraduates: 625 (Fall 2025)
- Location: York, Pennsylvania, U.S.
- Campus: Commuter
- Colors: Navy Blue and White
- Nickname: Penn State York Nittany Lions
- Mascot: Nittany Lion
- Website: york.psu.edu

Penn State York is a commonwealth campus of Pennsylvania State University located in York County, PA in Spring Garden Township. In May 2025 Penn State officials announced it would close after the Spring 2027 semester, citing low enrollment and financial losses.

The York campus was established in 1939 to provide technical education and to allow students to complete basic degree requirements in their home area before transferring to University Park to finish their program. In 1953, the school began to offer its first complete associate degree programs. It moved to its present location in 1956.

It enrolled 742 students as of 2021. As of 2025, Penn State York remains a suburban commuter-campus and occupies 51 acres (210,000 m^{2}). The campus offers 12 baccalaureate degrees, 8 minors, 5 associate-level degrees, a Master of Education in Teaching and Curriculum, an English as a Second Language Program Specialist Certificate, a Directors Credential, and two 1-credit graduate level courses.

== Closure ==
On May 22, 2025 the Board of Trustees of Pennsylvania State University announced the closure of seven of its twenty regional Commonwealth campuses, including Penn State York. Enrollment had dropped to 703 students as of Fall 2024, a 61% decline from its peak and a drop of 40% in the past ten years. There were 19 other colleges within 30 miles (48 km) of the campus, which only had commuter students. In fiscal 2024, financial losses for campus were $387,453, and the campus had $29.9 million in deferred maintenance (or $43,000 per student). Penn State York will close after the Spring 2027 semester. Current students, faculty and staff will be offered support as the campus transitions to closure over a two-year period.

On November 12, 2026 it was announced that York College of Pennsylvania would acquire the campus at the cost of $7.4MM in partnership with WellSpan Health.

== Athletics ==
Undergraduate demographics as of Fall 2023
Race and ethnicity	Total
White	63%
Hispanic	12%
Black	9%
Asian	7%
International student	5%
Two or more races	4%
Unknown	2%
Economic diversity
Low-income (Note: The percentage of students who received an income-based federal Pell grant intended for low-income students.)	31%
Affluent (Note: The percentage of students who are a part of the American middle class at the bare minimum.)	69%

Penn State–York teams participate as a member of the United States Collegiate Athletic Association (USCAA). The Nittany Lions are a member of the Pennsylvania State University Athletic Conference (PSUAC). Men's sports include baseball, basketball and soccer; while women's sports include basketball, volleyball, and softball. Golf, for men and women, was recently added.
