= Penn State Berks =

Public university in Spring Township, Pennsylvania, USA

Coordinates: 40.358318°N 75.971167°W

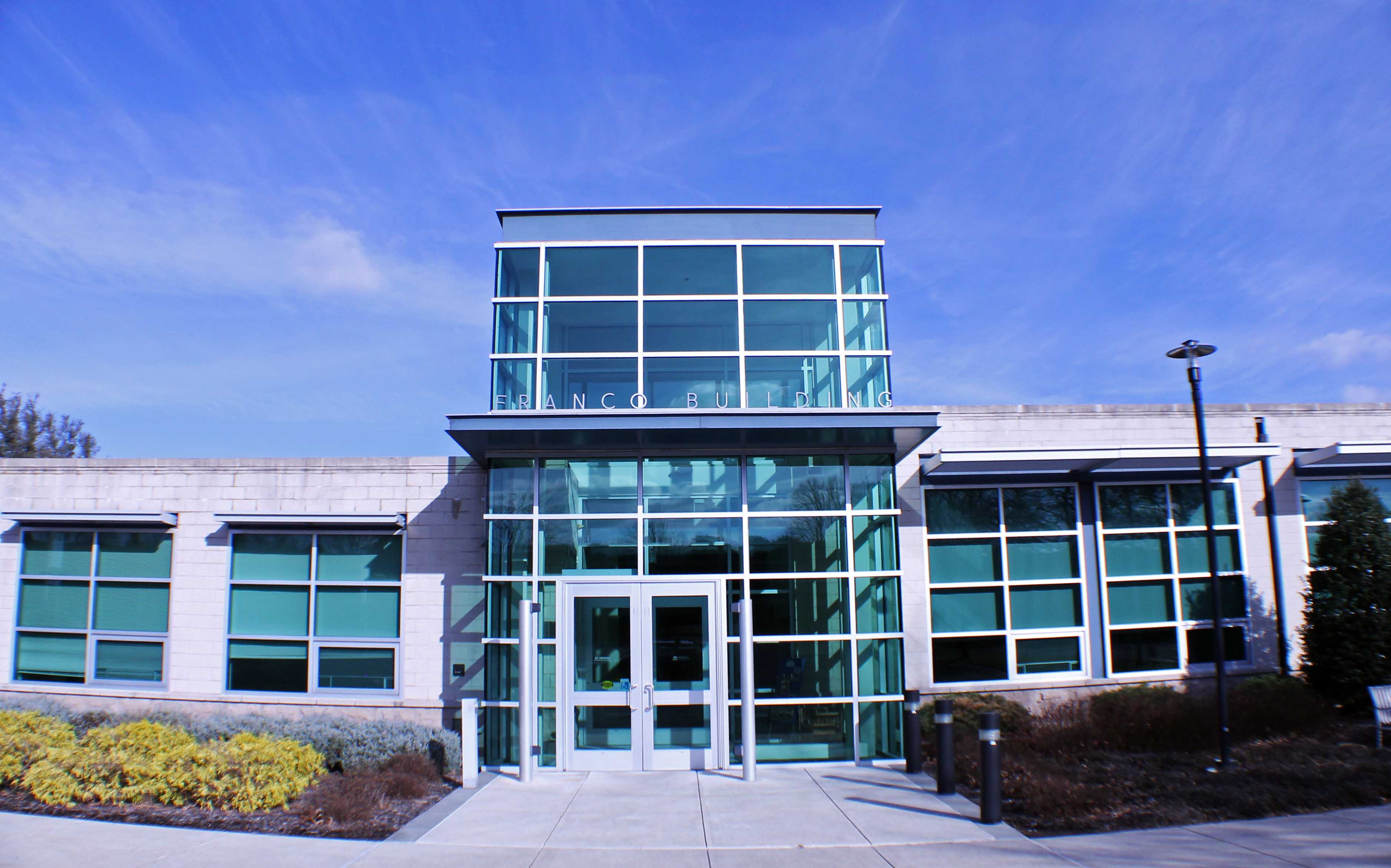
- A front view of the Franco Administrative Building
- Former name: List: Educational Department of Textile Machine Works (1927–1933); Wyomissing Polytechnic Institute (1933–1958); Wyomissing Center of The Pennsylvania State University (1958–1964); Penn State Berks Center (1964–1972); Penn State Berks-Lehigh Valley College (1997–2005)
- Type: Public satellite campus
- Established: 1927; 99 years ago (predecessor); July 1, 1958; 68 years ago (Penn State system)
- Parent institution: Pennsylvania State University
- Chancellor: Radha Pyati
- President: Neeli Bendapudi
- Faculty: 206 full-time and adjunct
- Students: 1,716 (Fall 2025)
- Undergraduates: 1,709 (Fall 2025)
- Postgraduates: 7 (Fall 2025)
- Location: Spring Township, Pennsylvania, U.S.
- Campus: Suburban 258 acres
- Colors: Navy Blue and White
- Sporting affiliations: NCAA Division III - UEC
- Mascot: Nittany Lion
- Website: berks.psu.edu

Penn State Berks is a commonwealth campus of Pennsylvania State University located in Spring Township in Berks County, Pennsylvania.

== History ==
The school traces its origins to 1927 and the establishment of a training school for workers for the Textile Machine Works, a major company in the region's textile industry. This school, which was known as the "Educational Department of Textile Machine Works" from 1927 to 1933 and then was the "Wyomissing Polytechnic Institute" from 1933 to 1958, was established with the aid of the then-Pennsylvania State College. WPI occupied the original Sacred Heart Church building on Hill Road, where the McDonald's Restaurant now stands, from 1930 to 1958. WPI, which is considered the first official predecessor to Penn State Berks, closed in 1958 with the down-turn of the textile industry at large in the Reading area.

Nonetheless, WPI's founders offered the school's campus to Penn State, who incorporated the school into the Penn State system as the "Wyomissing Center of The Pennsylvania State University". The newly-rebranded school, part of Penn State's nascent commonwealth campus system, officially opened its doors on July 1, 1958.

The Berks campus has experienced many changes since then. Its name changed for a first time in 1964, becoming the "Penn State Berks Center". It then moved to its present Spring Township location in 1972, when it also adopted its current name, "Penn State Berks", for the first time. Dormitories were first added in 1990 with additional dorms in 2001, which made Berks a commuter as well as a residential campus.

Student enrollment at Penn State Berks has increased steadily since 1972, when approximately 500 students attended. Today, there are an estimated 2,800 students enrolled. The campus currently has 15 buildings on 241 acres (1 km^{2}) of land. There are 100 full-time and 70 part-time faculty members.

While being a commonwealth campus of the state land-grant university, since 1997 it has offered baccalaureate degrees independently from The Pennsylvania State University University Park campus in partnership with a neighboring campus under the title of Berks and Lehigh Valley College. During this partnership period, the school was renamed "Penn State Berks-Lehigh Valley College".

Under a university-ordered reconstruction in 2005, only eight years later, the school was split back up into two institutions. With Penn State Lehigh Valley becoming a separate campus, the Spring Township campus reverted to its previous name, "Penn State Berks". At this time, Penn State Berks became a stand-alone college in the Penn State system and Penn State Lehigh Valley became a part of the University College system.

== Student life ==
Undergraduate demographics as of Fall 2023
Race and ethnicity	Total
White	60%
Hispanic	15%
Asian	9%
Black	8%
International student	3%
Two or more races	3%
Unknown	2%
Economic diversity
Low-income (Note: The percentage of students who received an income-based federal Pell grant intended for low-income students.)	30%
Affluent (Note: The percentage of students who are a part of the American middle class at the bare minimum.)	70%

Penn State Berks has over 50 active clubs. All student organizations are overseen by the Student Government Association, which requires that all clubs complete 24 hours of community service per semester in return for providing funds.

== Housing on campus ==
The Woods	The Village
Amber Hall; Evergreen Hall; Juniper Hall; Pepperwood Hall; Poplar Hall; Willow Hall; Ivy Hall	Cedar Hall; Greenbriar Hall; Sage Hall; Laurel Hall; Oakmoss Hall; Sweetwood Hall

== Facilities ==
Penn State Berks features a large library, modern laboratories, and computer facilities. Recreational areas include basketball courts, outdoor sand and grass volleyball courts, baseball & softball fields, and an artificial turf soccer pitch.

Penn State Berks is home to the Beaver Athletics and Wellness Center. The Center was renovated in 2022 and includes a performance gymnasium, auxiliary gymnasium, dance studio, workout gym, and classrooms. The Center also features an exercise physiology laboratory and a biomechanics laboratory operated by the Department of Kinesiology.

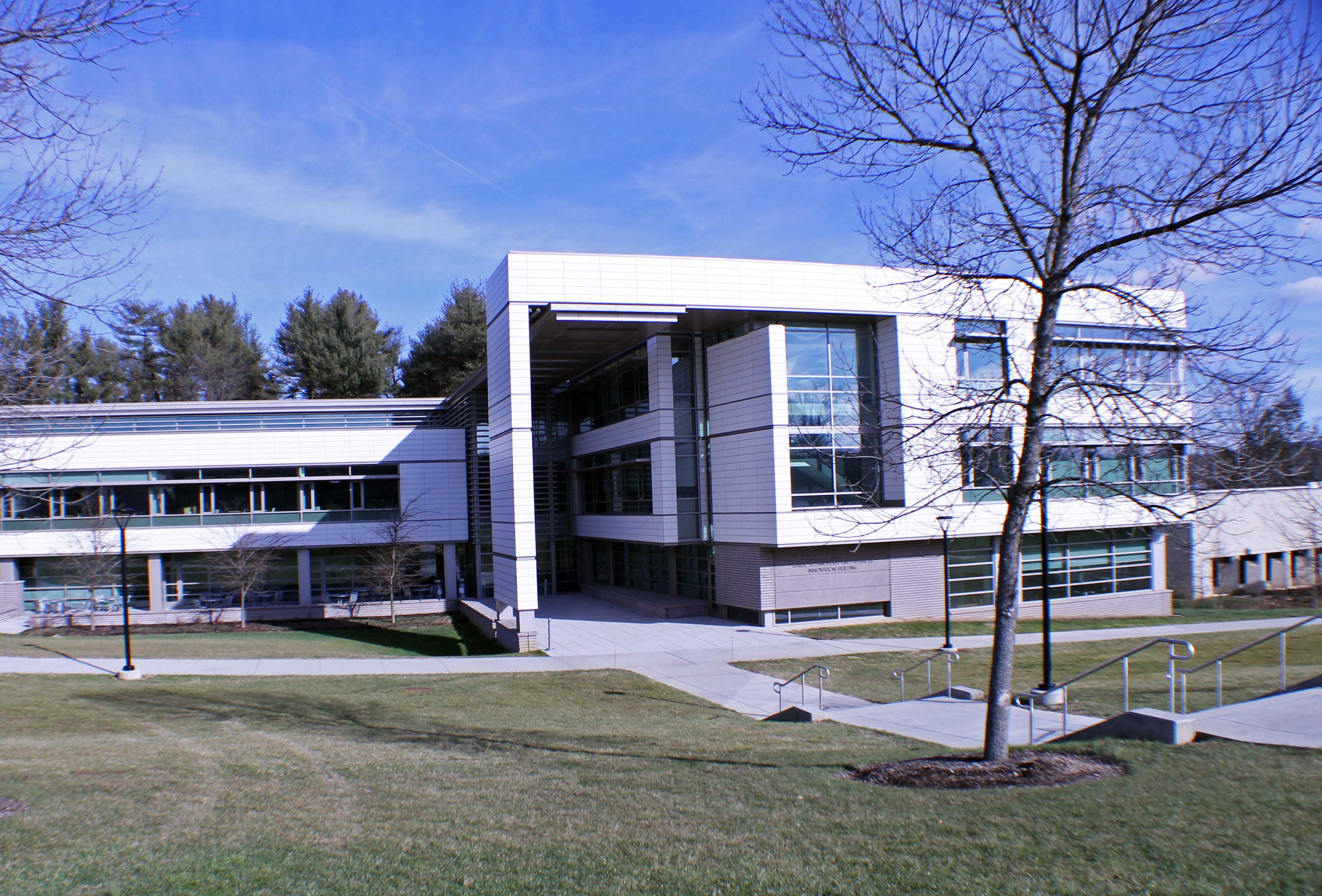
Gaige Technology and Innovation Center

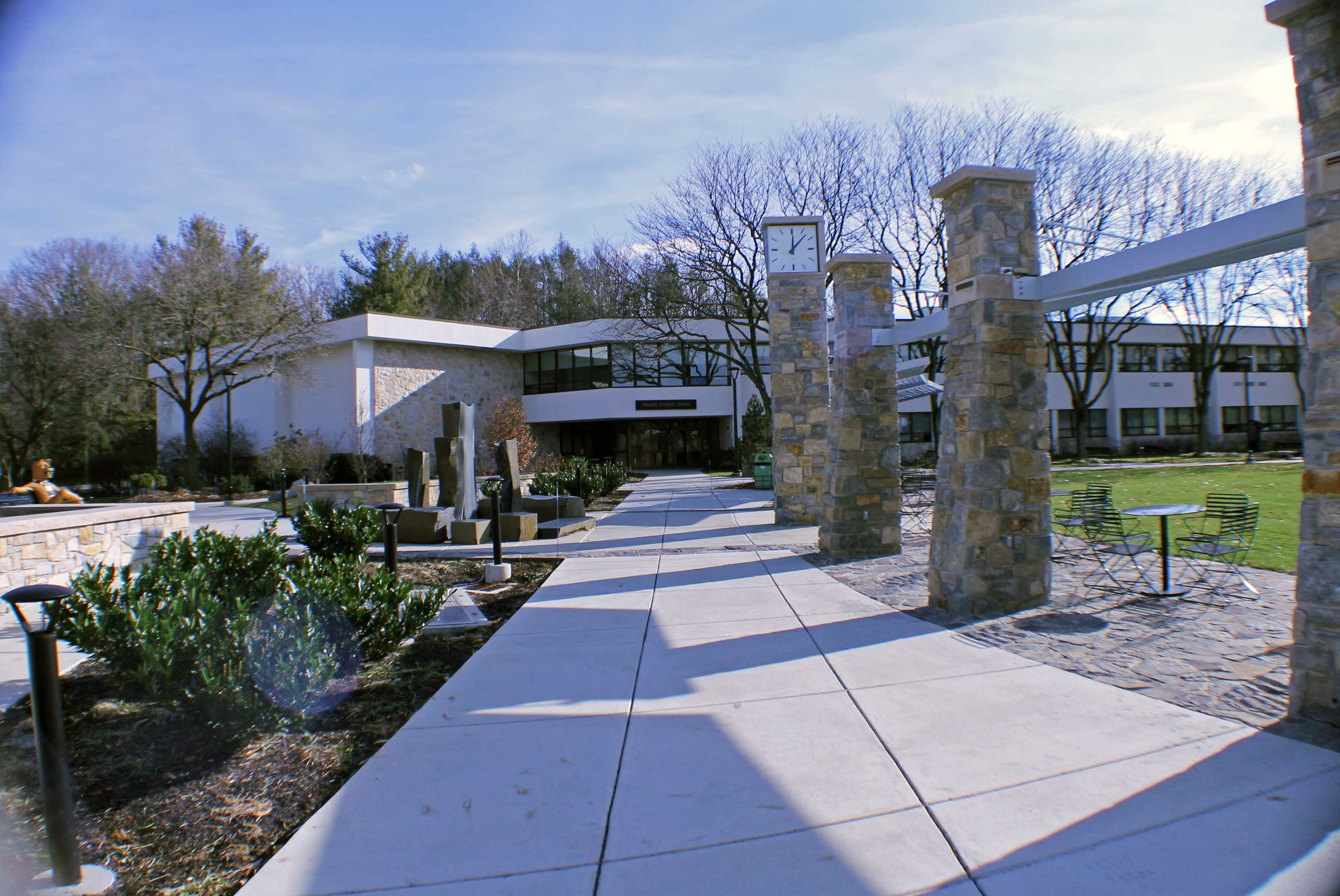
View of the path to the Perkins Student Center

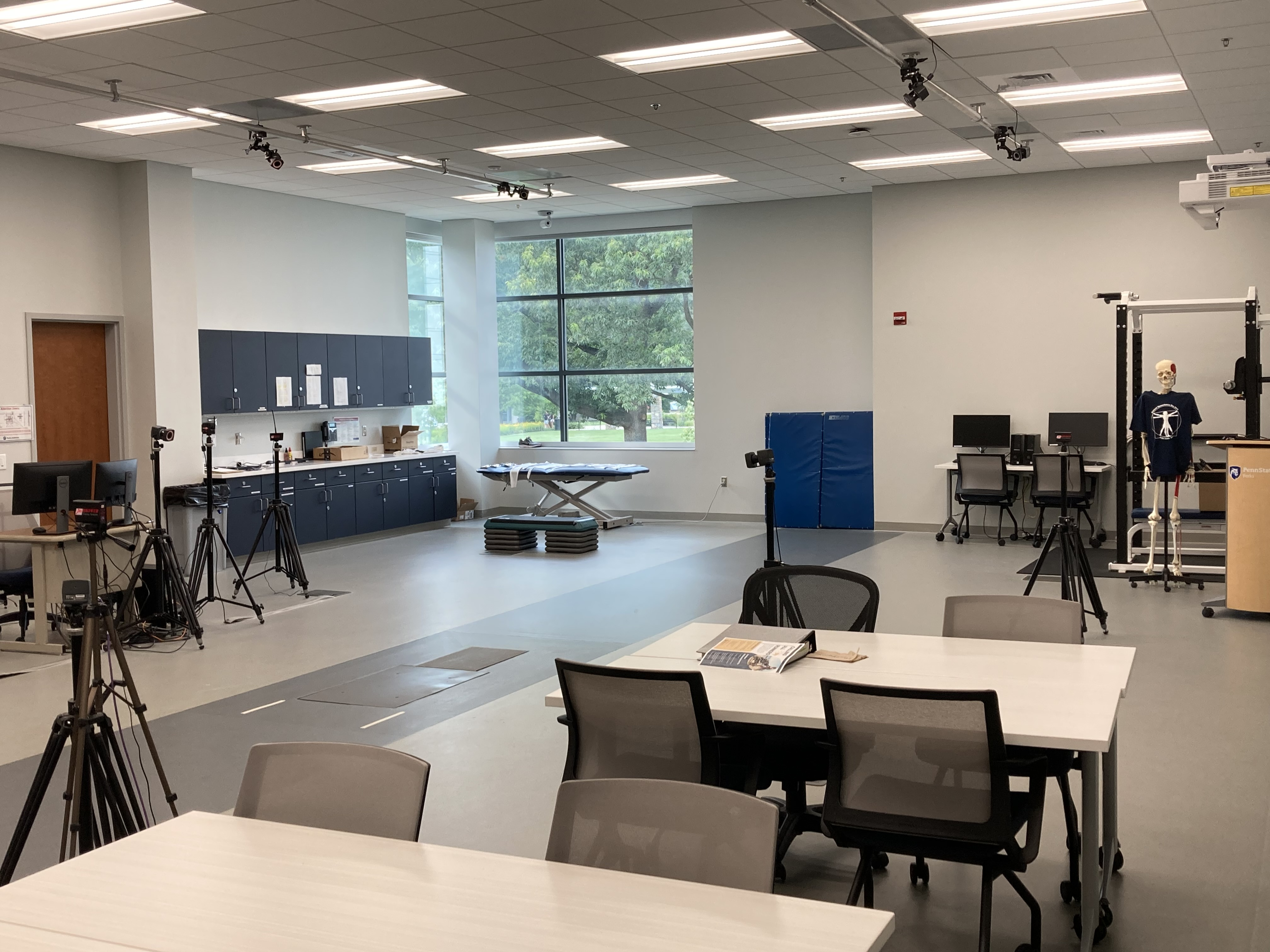
Biomechanics Lab at PSU Berks

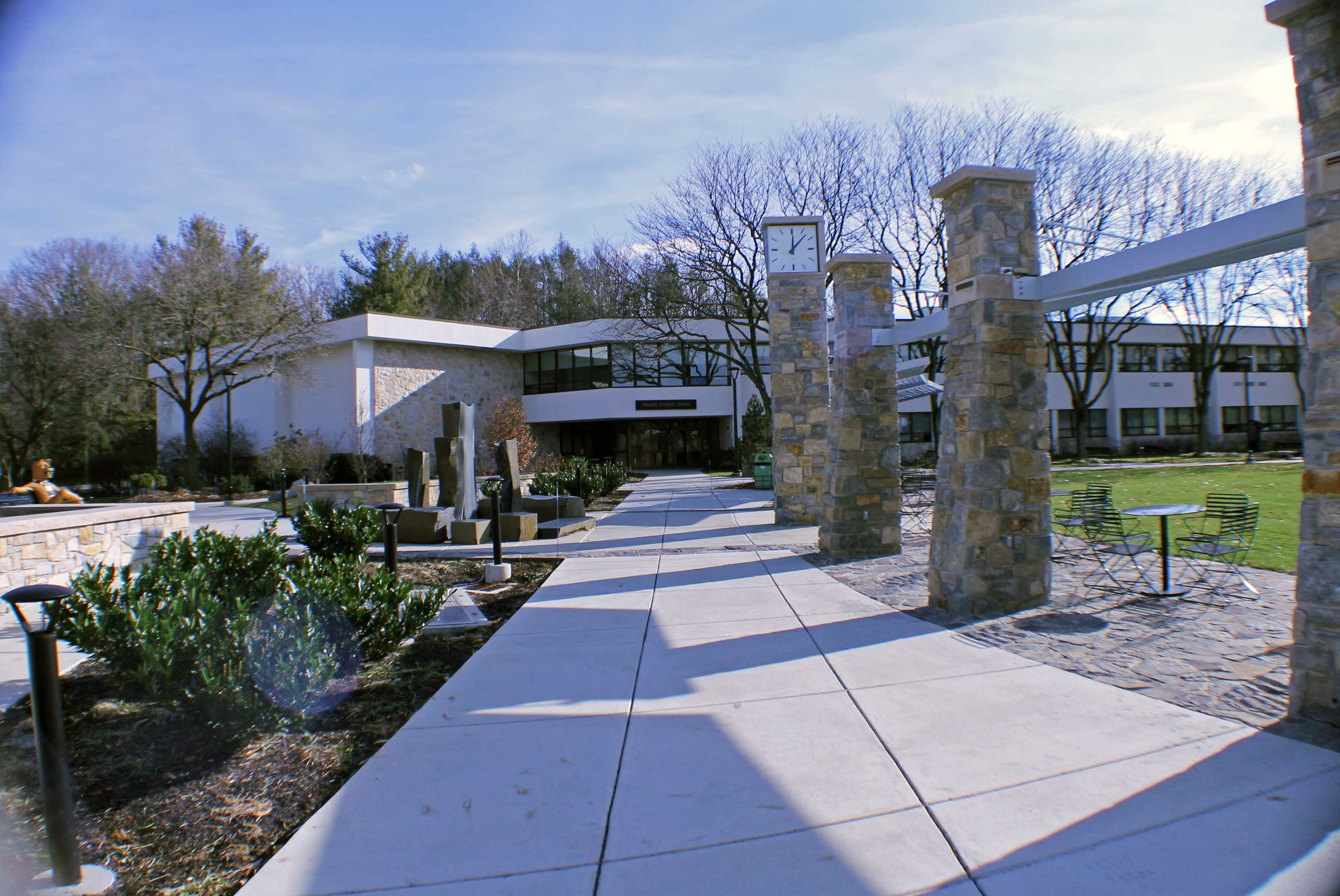
Perkins Center

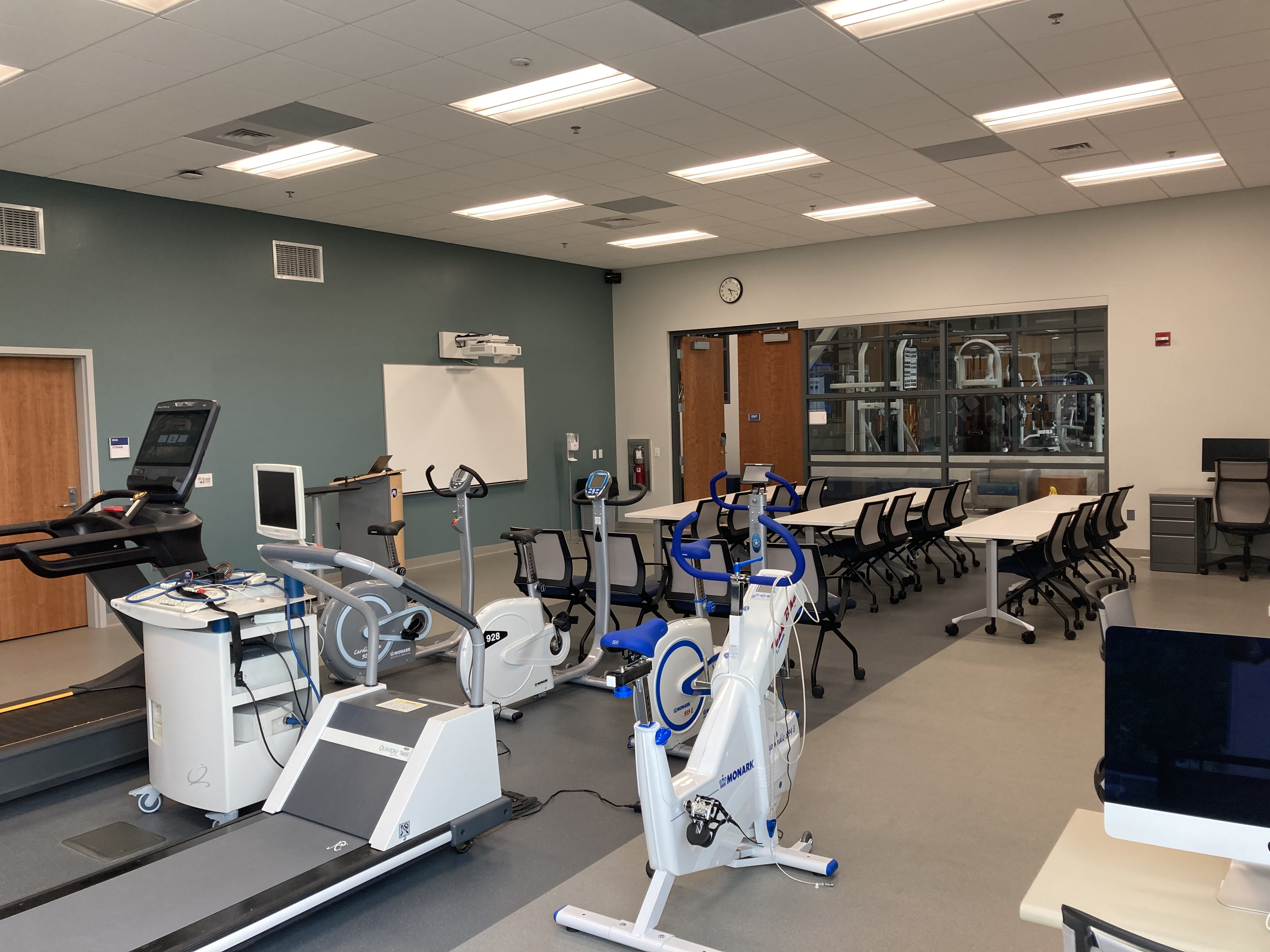
Exercise Physiology Lab at PSU Berks

== Athletics ==
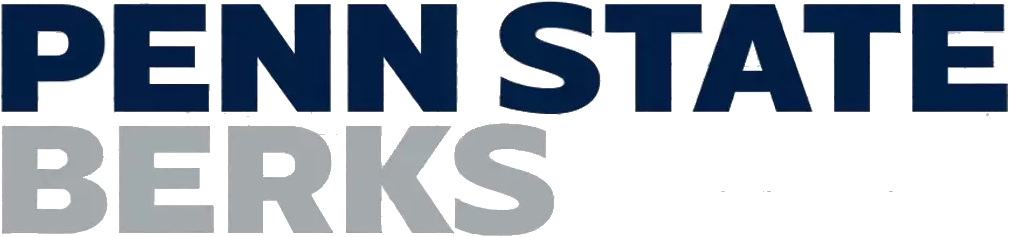
Penn State Berks athletics wordmark

Penn State Berks, known athletically as the Nittany Lions, compete at the NCAA Division III level; which is also a member of the United East Conference. Prior to the 2021-2022 academic year, the United East Conference was branded as the North Eastern Atlantic Conference (NEAC).

Penn State–Berks fields 9 varsity sports: baseball, basketball, cross country, golf, indoor track & field, soccer, softball, tennis, and volleyball.

=== Conference championships ===
All titles in the United East Conference (then "North Eastern Athletic Conference", NEAC):

- Baseball (m): 2009, 2011, 2012, 2014, 2016, 2017, and 2018
- Basketball (w): 2010
- Cross Country (w): 2017
- Cross Country (m): 2025, 2026
- Golf (m): 2018
- Tennis (m): 2005, 2008, 2017, and 2018
- Soccer (w): 2013, 2014, 2015, 2016, 2017, 2018, and 2019. United East Champions in 2022 and 2023. The Women's Soccer team participated in the NCAA Sweet Sixteen Tournament in 2016
- Softball: 2013, 2014, 2015, 2017, 2018 and 2019. United East Champions in 2022 and 2023
- Tennis (w): 2004, 2006, 2007, 2010, 2012, 2013, 2015, 2016 and 2018

=== Club Sports ===
Penn State–Berks also fields a number of competitive club sports that have no affiliation with the NCAA or United East. Club programs include: bowling, Ice hockey, lacrosse, rugby union, track and field, and equestrianism

== See also ==
- Pennsylvania State University Commonwealth campuses
- Penn State Lehigh Valley
