= Penn State University Athletic Conference =

Sports conference

The Penn State University Athletic Conference (PSUAC) is a member conference of the United States Collegiate Athletic Association. It currently comprises 12 of the Commonwealth Campuses of Pennsylvania State University. After the 2026–27 academic year, only six campuses will remain as Penn State is closing DuBois, Fayette, Mont Alto, New Kensington, Shenango, Wilkes-Barre, and York campuses.

== History ==
The PSUAC joined the United States Collegiate Athletic Association (USCAA) in the 2008–09 academic year.

== Member schools ==
=== Current members ===
The PSUAC currently has 12 full members. All are public schools:

Institution	Location (Note: All cities are located within the State of Pennsylvania.)	Founded	Enrollment	Nickname	Division
Penn State–Beaver	Monaca	1965	496	Nittany Lions	West
Penn State–DuBois	DuBois	1935	385	Nittany Lions	West
Penn State–Fayette (Note: Also known as Penn State–Fayette, The Eberly Campus.)	Uniontown	1934	407	Roaring Lions	West
Penn State–Greater Allegheny (Note: Formerly known as Penn State–McKeesport.)	McKeesport	1948	353	Lions	West
Penn State–Hazleton	Hazleton	1934	515	Nittany Lions	East
Penn State–Lehigh Valley	Center Valley	1912	913	Nittany Lions	East
Penn State–Mont Alto	Mont Alto	1903	613	Nittany Lions	East (Note: With the departure of Penn State–Brandywine, Penn State–Mont Alto moved to the East.)
Penn State–New Kensington	New Kensington	1958	432	Nittany Lions	West
Penn State–Schuylkill	Schuylkill Haven	1934	698	Nittany Lions	East
Penn State–Scranton (Note: Formerly known as Penn State–Worthington-Scranton.)	Dunmore	1923	827	Nittany Lions	East
Penn State–Shenango (Note: Formerly known as Penn State–Shenango Valley.)	Sharon	1965	309	Lions	West
Penn State–York	York	1926	703	Nittany Lions	East

=== Former members ===
The PSUAC had two former full members, both were public schools:

Institution	Location (Note: All cities are located within the State of Pennsylvania.)	Founded	Affiliation	Enrollment	Nickname	Left	Division	Current conference
Penn State–Brandywine (Note: Formerly known as Penn State–Delaware County.)	Media	1967	PSUCC	1,630	Lions	2024	East	United East (UEC) (Note: Currently an NCAA Division III athletic conference.)
Penn State–Wilkes-Barre	Lehman	1916	PSUCC	329	Nittany Lions	2025	East	N/A

== Sports ==
Conference sports
Sport	Men's	Women's
Baseball	✓	
Basketball	✓	✓
Cross country	✓	✓
Golf	✓	✓
Soccer	✓	✓
Softball		✓
Volleyball		✓

== See also ==
- Hudson Valley Intercollegiate Athletic Conference
- Yankee Small College Conference
