= Penn State New Kensington =

Public college in Kensington, Pennsylvania, U.S.

Coordinates: 40.551138°N 79.69727°W

- Type: Public satellite campus
- Established: 1958
- Parent institution: Pennsylvania State University
- Affiliations: PSUAC (USCAA)
- Chancellor: Kevin Snider
- President: Neeli Bendapudi
- Faculty: 38 full-time
- Students: 386 (Fall 2025)
- Undergraduates: 384 (Fall 2025)
- Postgraduates: 2 (Fall 2025)
- Location: New Kensington, Pennsylvania, U.S.
- Colors: Blue and White
- Nickname: Nittany Lions
- Website: Penn State New Kensington

Penn State New Kensington is a commonwealth campus of the Pennsylvania State University located in New Kensington, Pennsylvania. The campus has an enrollment of 545 undergraduate students and offers twelve bachelor's degree programs and five associate degree programs as well as four men's and four women's sports. In May 2025, the Board of Trustees of Pennsylvania State University announced the closure of seven of its twenty regional Commonwealth campuses after the Spring 2027 semester, including Penn State New Kensington.

== History ==
The New Kensington campus was founded in 1958 as a result of a study of the local need for higher education in the Alle-Kiski Valley. The first class graduated in 1960 at the New Kensington Center in the city of New Kensington. The Center moved to the old Parnassus School in 1963. The current campus opened with the Engineering Building in 1966 on 35 acres (140,000 m^{2}) donated by ALCOA. Two years later the Science, Activities, and Administration buildings and the Library were completed and an additional 30 acres (120,000 m^{2}) were purchased from a neighboring farmer. In 1969 the Physical Education Complex opened followed by the Theatre in 1971 and the Student Learning Center in 1975. The Science and Technology Center opened in 1990. After a ten-year building hiatus, the Conference Center and Classroom Building was dedicated in March 2001.

=== Closure ===
On May 22, 2025 the Board of Trustees of Pennsylvania State University announced the closure of seven of its twenty regional Commonwealth campuses, including Penn State New Kensington. Enrollment had dropped to 432 students as of Fall 2024, a 56% decline from its peak and a drop of 35% in the past ten years. There were 15 other colleges within 30 miles (48 km) of the campus, which only had commuter students. In fiscal 2024, financial losses for campus were $3.1 million, and the campus had $27.8 million in deferred maintenance (or $64,000 per student). Penn State New Kensington will close after the Spring 2027 semester. Current students, faculty and staff will be offered support as the campus transitions to closure over a two-year period.

== Campus ==
=== Financial aid and scholarships ===
70 percent of students receive aid (loans, scholarships, grants, work-study); Thirty-five campus scholarships awarded to 140 students.

=== Student life ===
Undergraduate demographics as of Fall 2023
Race and ethnicity	Total
White	79%
Black	6%
Hispanic	6%
Two or more races	4%
Asian	2%
International student	1%
Unknown	1%
Economic diversity
Low-income (Note: The percentage of students who received an income-based federal Pell grant intended for low-income students.)	33%
Affluent (Note: The percentage of students who are a part of the American middle class at the bare minimum.)	67%

Penn State New Kensington has 20 student organizations that are academic, social, and professional in nature. The Campus Activities Board (CAB) and Student Life Office host a large range of events and activities for students that supplement their academic experience on campus. Most activities hosted by CAB and Student Life are free of charge or come at reduced costs to the students participating. One of the signature programs of student life at Penn State New Kensington is the Penn State in Pittsburgh program, which introduces students to the cultural, athletic, and recreational activities of the Pittsburgh region.

=== Athletics ===
Penn State–New Kensington teams participate as a member of the United States Collegiate Athletic Association (USCAA). The Nittany Lions are also a member of the Pennsylvania State University Athletic Conference (PSUAC).

Penn State New Kensington hosts the following athletic teams:

Men's Teams	Women's Teams	Co-Ed Teams
Baseball	Basketball	Golf
Basketball	Softball	
Soccer	Volleyball	

=== Facilities ===
Ten buildings on seventy-two wooded acres that includes a multi-purpose Conference Center, the 350-seat Forum Theatre, 600-seat Athletics Center; Art Gallery.

- Blissell Library: Over 40,000 books, 200 journal and newspaper subscriptions, and a small video collection. Electronic access to nearly four million volumes in Penn State's Libraries system.
- Information Technology Center: Dedicated in June 2000, the $3 million IT Center is equipped with state-of-the-art software and computer technology. The Center contains the 35-seat Allegheny Ludlum Technology Classroom; two additional multi-media classrooms, a video conferencing room, a laboratory for network simulation and pc troubleshooting, and a smaller learning studio. The IT Center contains high-end Pentium 4 workstations and it is located in the Activities Building.
- Ten Specialized Laboratories: Electro-Mechanical Engineering Technology Measurement & Instrumentation Laboratory; Electro-Mechanical Engineering Technology Control Systems Laboratory; Mechanical Engineering Laboratory; Robotics Laboratory which includes separate stations and milling stations; Electrical Engineering Technology Lab; Power Laboratory; Computer Aided Drafting and Design Laboratory; Drafting Classroom; Biomedical Engineering Technology Laboratory (one of only three in the country); Biomedical Engineering Technology Operating Laboratory.
- Computer Center: Large student laboratory, two teaching laboratories and a faculty laboratory; five-to-one student to computer ratio is one of the lowest ratios in the university; students receive e-mail and Internet account.

== See also ==
- Pennsylvania State University Commonwealth campuses
