= Nittany Lion =

Mountain lion mascot of Pennsylvania State University

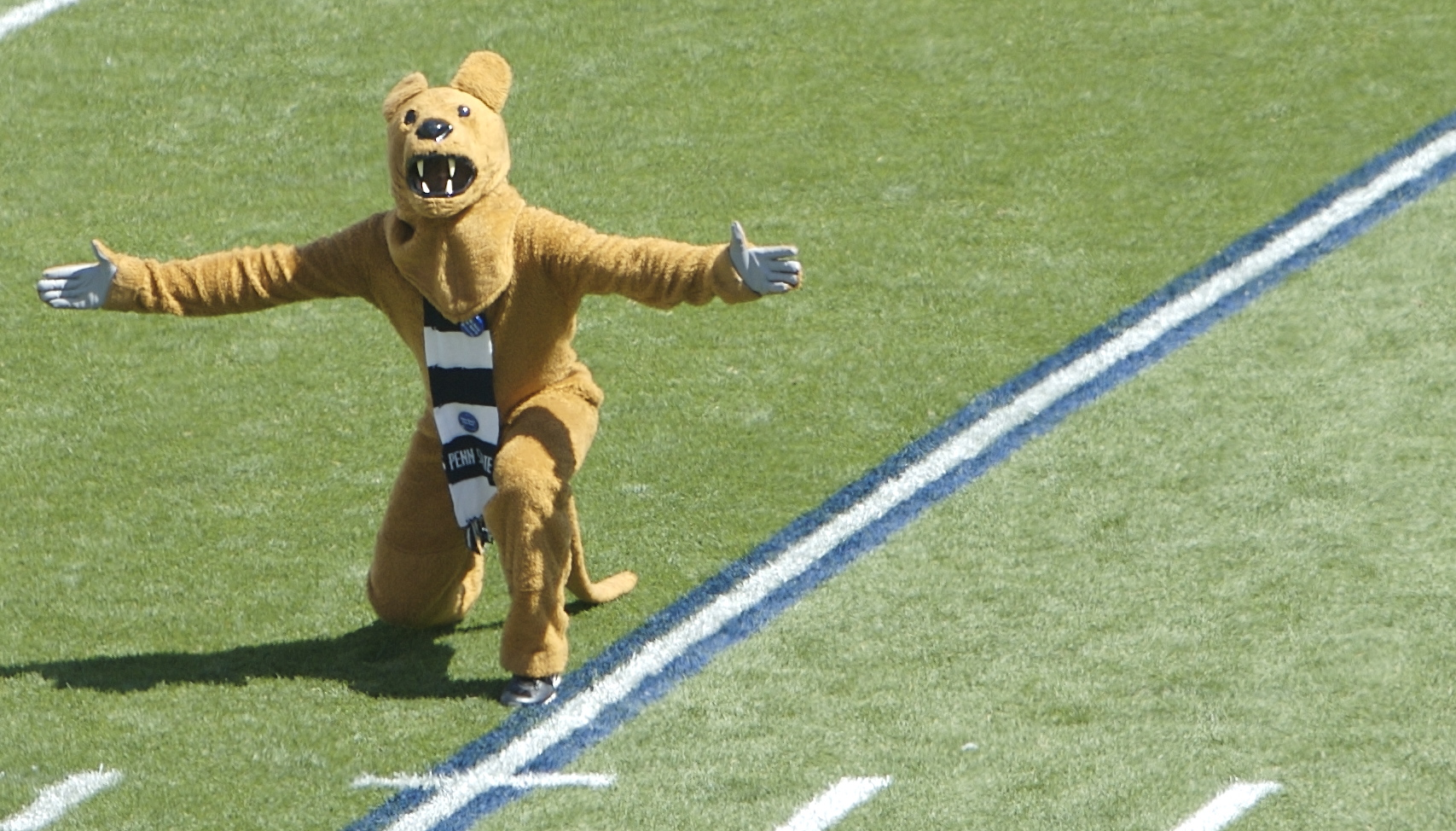
- The Nittany Lion mascot at the 2007 season opener at Beaver Stadium against FIU
- University: Pennsylvania State University
- Conference: Big Ten
- Description: Nittany Lion
- Origin of name: Mount Nittany in Pennsylvania
- First seen: 1904; 122 years ago
- Website: gopsusports.com/nittany-lion

The Nittany Lion is the eastern mountain lion mascot of the athletic teams of the Pennsylvania State University, known as the Penn State Nittany Lions. Created in 1907, the "Nittany" forename refers to Mount Nittany, which overlooks the university.

== History ==
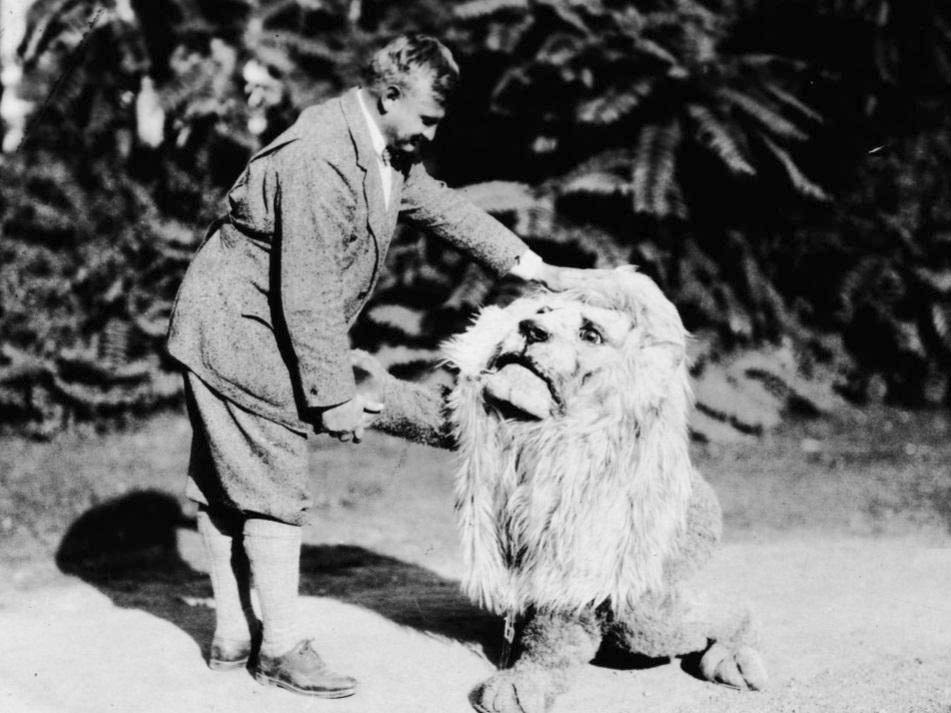
Penn State football coach Hugo Bezdek shakes hands with the Nittany Lion in the 1920s

The mascot was the creation of Penn State senior H. D. "Joe" Mason in 1904. While on a trip to Princeton University, Mason had been embarrassed that Penn State did not have a mascot. Mason did not let that deter him: he fabricated the Nittany Lion on the spot and proclaimed that it would easily defeat the Princeton Bengal tiger.

The Lion's primary means of attack against the Tiger would be its strong right arm, capable of slaying any foes, which is now traditionally exemplified through cumulative one-armed push-ups after the team scores a touchdown. Upon returning to campus, he set about making his invention a reality. In 1907, he wrote in the student publication The Lemon:

Every college the world over of any consequence has a college emblem of some kind—all but The Pennsylvania State College...Why not select for ours the king of beasts—the Lion!! Dignified, courageous, magnificent, the Lion allegorically represents all that our College Spirit should be, so why not 'the Nittany Mountain Lion'? Why cannot State have a kingly, all-conquering Lion as the eternal sentinel?

=== Origins of the Nittany Lion ===
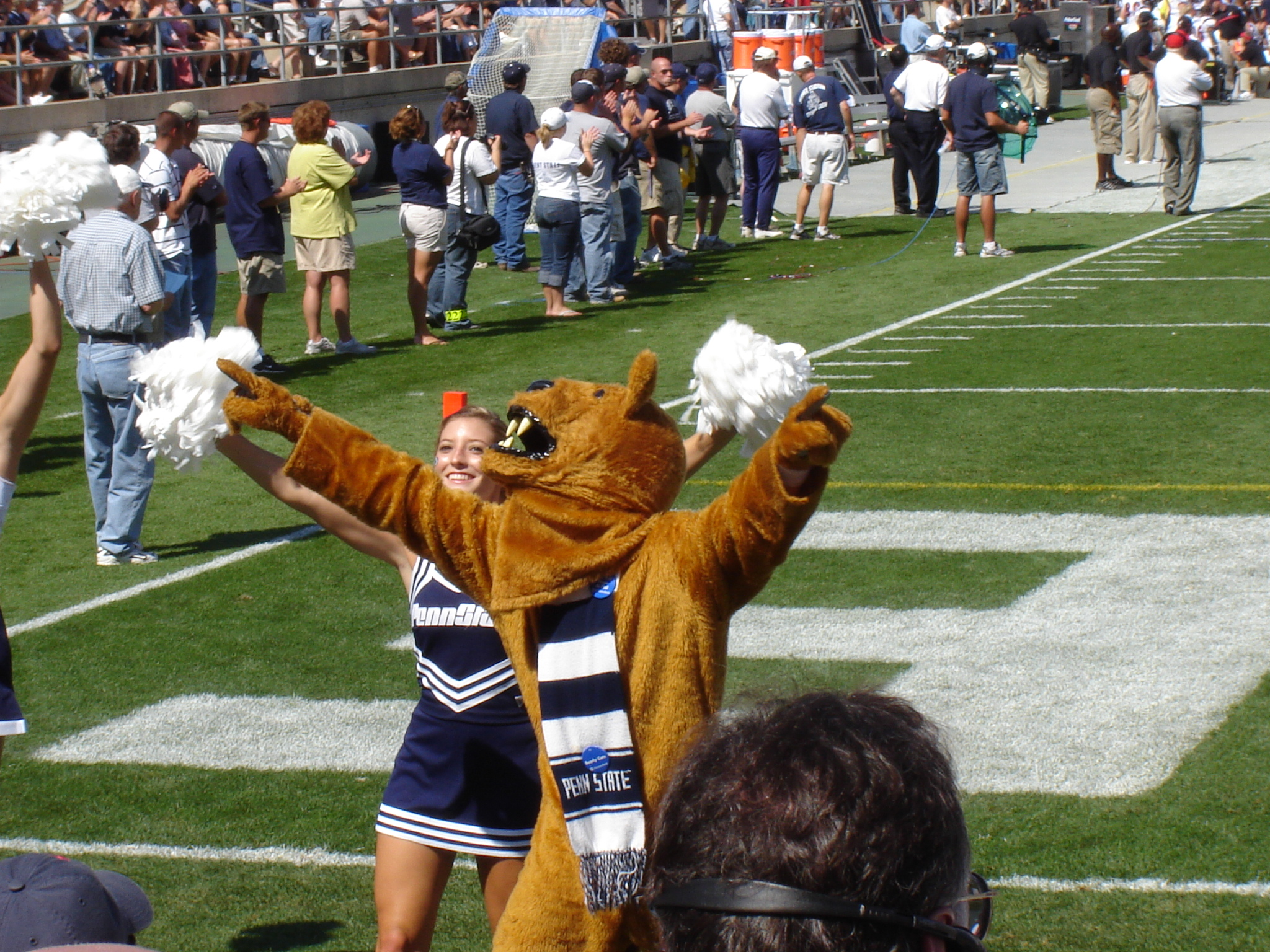
The Nittany Lion mascot pumps up the crowd at the 2005 Penn State Nittany Lions football game versus Cincinnati at Beaver Stadium

Eastern mountain lions had roamed on nearby Mount Nittany until the 1880s. The name "Mount Nittany" derives from the Algonquian word meaning "single mountain." The "original" Nittany Lion can be seen in the Penn State All-Sports Museum. It was killed in Susquehanna County by Samuel Brush in 1856.

According to a July 1992 article in National Geographic, "Courthouse records from Centre County, Pennsylvania show that one local hunter killed 64 lions between 1820 and 1845."

=== The Tale of the Nittany Lion Mascot ===
The history of the Nittany Lion mascot is documented in The Nittany Lion: An Illustrated Tale (1997) by Penn State librarians Jackie R. Esposito and Steven L. Herb. The book traces the origins of the mascot from the local folklore of Indian Princess Nita-nee and the mountain lions that once roamed central Pennsylvania, to the adoption of the “lion” as Penn State's symbol following a 1904 baseball game at Princeton University. It also details the creation of the limestone Nittany Lion Shrine on the University Park campus, and the tradition of the “Men in the Suit,” the many students who have performed as the mascot. The work further connects the mascot's story to notable figures in Penn State and Pennsylvania history, including folklorist Henry Shoemaker, student leader H. D. “Joe” Mason, sculptor Heinz Warneke, mascot performer Norm Constantine, and football coaches Rip Engle and Joe Paterno.

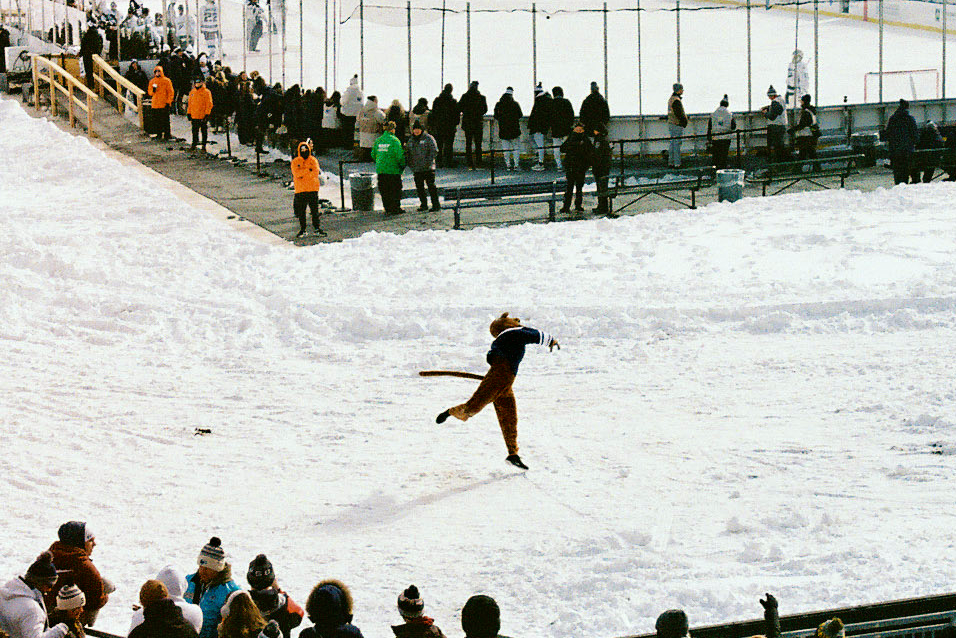
The Nittany Lion throws a snowball at the first Men's Ice Hockey game at Beaver Stadium in 2026

=== Female Nittany Lion Mascot Finalist ===
In 1996, Nancy Barrett (Rehm) became the first and, to date, only female to try out for the Nittany Lion mascot position. She was one of four finalists for the 1996–97 role, performing a prepared skit, impromptu routine, and the traditional one-arm pushups at the final tryout in Rec Hall. Although not ultimately selected, Barrett's advancement marked a historic milestone in the mascot's history.

== The Lion Suit ==
The design and construction of the Nittany Lion mascot costume has evolved significantly over time. The earliest versions were produced by Clearfield Furs and made from real mountain lion skin. In 1990, following the company's closure, production shifted to Elisabeth DeAngelo-Tucker and her husband John Tucker, who continue to create the suit. Elisabeth, trained in sewing by her mother Mieko DeAngelo, modernized the costume by introducing lightweight and washable polyester faux fur, improving durability and ease of maintenance. Despite these updates, traditional features such as the Lion's exposed teeth - carried over from the original design - remain part of the suit's appearance.

== Theme song ==
In the early 1920s, a song was created to honor the mascot. Entitled "The Nittany Lion", it is played during sporting events on campus.

== See also ==
- Nittany Lion Shrine
- Penn State Nittany Lions
- Pennsylvania State University
