= Neeli Bendapudi =

Indian-American academic administrator

19th President of Pennsylvania State University
- Incumbent
- Assumed office May 9, 2022
- Preceded by: Eric J. Barron

18th President of the University of Louisville
- In office May 15, 2018 – December 9, 2021
- Preceded by: James R. Ramsey
- Succeeded by: Lori Stewart Gonzalez (interim)

Provost and Executive Vice Chancellor of the University of Kansas
- In office July 1, 2016 – April 27, 2018
- Preceded by: Jeffrey Vitter
- Succeeded by: Carl Lejuez (acting)

Personal details
- Born: 1962 or 1963 (age 63–64) Visakhapatnam, India
- Education: Andhra University (BA, MBA); University of Kansas (PhD)

Neeli Bendapudi (née Dutta) is an Indian-American academic administrator who has been the 19th president of Pennsylvania State University since 2022. From 2018 until 2021, she served as the 18th president of the University of Louisville. In December 2021, Penn State announced Bendapudi as the university's president; she succeeded Eric J. Barron following his retirement. She is the first woman and the first non-white person to serve as Penn State's president.

== Early life and education ==
Bendapudi was born in Visakhapatnam, India. Both her parents, T. Ramesh Dutta and Padma Dutta, were professors in English in Andhra University. She attended Andhra University, where she earned an undergraduate and master's degree. She moved to the United States in 1986 to attend graduate school at the University of Kansas, where she earned her Ph.D. in marketing in 1994.

== Career ==
Bendapudi has done consulting work for clients including Cessna, Deloitte, and Procter & Gamble. She has previously served as executive vice president and chief customer officer for Huntington National Bank.

Bendapudi held teaching posts at both Texas A&M University and Ohio State University's Fisher College of Business before returning to the University of Kansas to serve as the dean of the University of Kansas School of Business. From 1 July 2016, until her election as president at the University of Louisville, she served as provost and executive vice chancellor of the University of Kansas.

Bendapudi was named president of the University of Louisville on 3 April 2018, and her first day was 15 May 2018. She replaced James R. Ramsey, who resigned after a 2015 sex scandal that implicated him. She is the first non-white president of the University of Louisville and indicated an intention to develop a culture of openness. On 13 July 2018, in response to Papa John's Pizza founder John Schnatter's use of a racial slur, Bendapudi announced that Schnatter's name would be struck from the U of L's football stadium's name. On 13 December 2021, following Bendapudi's selection as the 19th president of Pennsylvania State University, she resigned as president of the University of Louisville, where she was succeeded by interim president Lori Stewart Gonzalez.

For the 2023–2024 academic year, Bendapudi's base salary as President of Penn State University was $950,000. In September 2025, the Penn State board of trustees voted to increase Bendapudi's base salary by 47% to $1.4 million a year, the highest salary of any president in the Big Ten.

== Administrative decisions and criticism ==
=== Closure of Commonwealth campuses ===
In February 2025, Penn State President Neeli Bendapudi announced plans to review the potential closure of several Commonwealth campuses. The proposal drew criticism from faculty members and some university trustees, who raised concerns about transparency and the administration's decision-making process.

On May 22, 2025, Penn State's Board of Trustees approved Bendapudi's proposal to close seven Commonwealth campuses by a vote of 25–8. The affected campuses were DuBois, Fayette, Mont Alto, New Kensington, Shenango, Wilkes-Barre, and York, with closures scheduled after the spring 2027 semester. The decision was expected to affect more than 3,100 students and over 500 employees.

Bendapudi defended the closures as necessary in response to declining enrollment, demographic changes, and financial difficulties. However, some faculty members and community representatives expressed concerns about reduced access to higher education in rural Pennsylvania. Critics also questioned whether the university had sufficiently considered alternatives to campus closures.

=== Presidential compensation ===
On September 12, 2025, Penn State's Board of Trustees approved amendments to Bendapudi's compensation agreement by a vote of 34–1. Her annual base salary increased from $950,000 to $1.4 million, representing an increase of approximately 47.4%. The amended agreement also increased her annual retention bonus from $300,000 to $525,000 and supplemental retirement contributions from $555,000 to $650,000. The agreement additionally provided for annual performance bonuses of up to 15% of her base salary.

The compensation increase occurred while Penn State was implementing budget reductions and restructuring its Commonwealth campus system, prompting criticism of the university's spending priorities. On July 17, 2026, the Board of Trustees approved a $210,000 performance bonus for Bendapudi.

=== Cancellation of the Center for Racial Justice ===
In October 2022, Bendapudi announced that Penn State would discontinue plans to establish a Center for Racial Justice. The proposed center had been among the university's initiatives following the nationwide protests against racial injustice in 2020. A national search for the center's founding director had already begun in March 2022.

Bendapudi stated that supporting existing university programs addressing racial justice and equity would be more effective than creating a new center. The decision was criticized by faculty members involved in the proposed center, who expressed disappointment over the withdrawal of institutional support. More than 400 professors and lecturers subsequently signed a letter questioning the university administration's commitment to racial justice.
