= State University of New York Athletic Conference =

Intercollegiate athletic conference

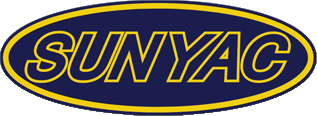
- Formerly: New York State Intercollegiate Athletic Conference (1958–1963)
- Association: NCAA
- Founded: 1958
- Commissioner: Tom Di Camillo (since 2014)
- Sports fielded: 22; men's: 10; women's: 12
- Division: Division III
- No. of teams: 12 full, 17 affiliates
- Headquarters: Syracuse, New York
- Region: New York
- Website: sunyacsports.com

Locations
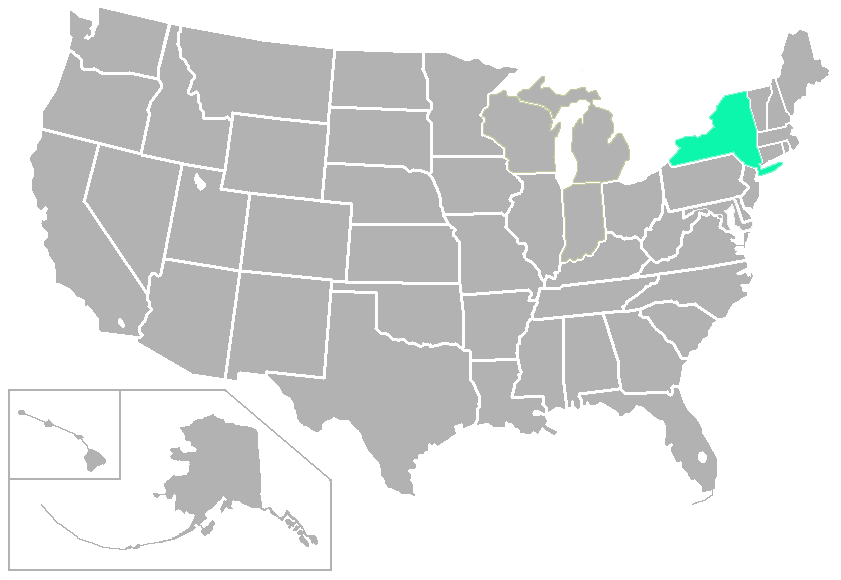

The State University of New York Athletic Conference (SUNYAC) is an intercollegiate athletic conference that competes in the National Collegiate Athletic Association (NCAA) Division III, consisting of schools in the State University of New York system. It was chartered in 1958 as the New York State Intercollegiate Athletic Conference.

== History ==
State University of New York Athletic Conference
Locations of SUNYAC members:
Full

=== Recent changes ===
On May 12, 2023, the SUNYAC announced that the conference absorbed the Northeast Women's Hockey League (NEWHL; a women's ice hockey-only league) and started to sponsor the sport. 5 full members of the SUNYAC were members of the NEWHL, therefore SUNY Canton and SUNY Morrisville became affiliate members of SUNYAC in that sport in the 2023–24 season.

On August 21, 2023, SUNY Brockport and SUNY Geneseo both announced that they would become full members of the Empire 8 starting in the 2024-25 season.

On October 5, 2023, the SUNYAC announced that started to sponsor men's wrestling effective immediately during the 2023-24 academic year, absorbing the remnants of the Empire Collegiate Wrestling Conference (ECWC), which 4 full members of the SUNYAC sponsor the sport. Also the SUNYAC welcomed Ithaca, RIT, St. Johns Fisher and Utica as affiliate members in that sport. Also in the same date, the SUNYAC announced that SUNY Canton and SUNY Morrisville will join the conference as full members starting in 2024-25.

On April 3, 2024, SUNY New Paltz announced that they would leave the SUNYAC after the conclusion of the 2025-26 season to join the New Jersey Athletic Conference (NJAC).

On June 5, 2025, it was announced that Alfred State College, SUNY Cobleskill, and SUNY Delhi would join the conference starting in 2026-27.

=== Chronological timeline ===
- 1958 – On September 19, 1958, the SUNYAC was founded as the New York State Intercollegiate Athletic Conference (NYSIAC). Charter members included the New York State College for Teachers at Albany (now the University at Albany), the Brockport State Teachers College (now the State University of New York at Brockport), the State University College for Teachers at Buffalo (now Buffalo State University), Cortland State Teachers College (now the State University of New York at Cortland), the New York State College for Teachers at New Paltz (now the State University of New York at New Paltz), the State University College of Education at Oneonta (now the State University of New York at Oneonta), Oswego State Teachers College (now the State University of New York at Oswego), Plattsburgh State Normal and Training School (now the State University of New York at Plattsburgh) and the New York State College for Teachers at Potsdam (now the State University of New York at Potsdam), beginning the 1958–59 academic year.
- 1959 – Geneseo Normal and Training School (now the State University of New York at Geneseo) and Fredonia State Teachers College (now the State University of New York at Fredonia) joined the SUNYAC in the 1959–60 academic year.
- 1963 – The NYSIAC was rebranded as the State University of New York Athletic Conference (SUNYAC) in the 1963–64 academic year.
- 1973 – Harpur College (now Binghamton University) joined the SUNYAC in the 1973–74 academic year.
- 1978 – The University at Buffalo joined the SUNYAC in the 1978–79 academic year.
- 1983 – Women's sports became part of the SUNYAC in the 1983–84 academic year.
- 1988 – SUNY Buffalo left the SUNYAC to join the Division I ranks of the National Collegiate Athletic Association (NCAA) as an NCAA D-I Independent after the 1987–88 academic year.
- 1991 – The State University of New York at Utica/Rome (now the State University of New York Polytechnic Institute (SUNY Poly)) joined the SUNYAC in the 1991–92 academic year.
- 1995 – SUNY Albany left the SUNYAC to join the NCAA Division II ranks as an NCAA D-II Independent after the 1994–95 academic year.
- 1997 – SUNY Binghamton left the SUNYAC to join the NCAA Division II ranks as an NCAA D-II Independent after the 1996–97 academic year.
- 2007 – The State University of New York at Morrisville (also known as Morrisville State College) joined the SUNYAC in the 2007–08 academic year.
- 2008 – SUNYIT left the SUNYAC to join the North East Athletic Conference (NEAC; now known as the United East Conference) after the 2007–08 academic year.
- 2009 – SUNY Morrisville left the SUNYAC to join the NEAC (after a tenure of two seasons) at the end of the 2008–09 academic year; while the school has since remained in the league as an associate member from 2009–10 on forward for field hockey and men's ice hockey.
- 2023:
  - Six institutions joined the SUNYAC as associate members (and/or added other single sports into their associate memberships), all effective in the 2023–24 academic year:
    - Ithaca College, Rochester Institute of Technology (RIT), St. John Fisher University and Utica University for men's wrestling; all coming from the defunct wrestling-only Empire Collegiate Wrestling Conference (ECWC)
    - and the State University of New York at Canton (SUNY Canton) and former full member SUNY Morrisville for women's ice hockey; both coming from the defunct ice hockey-only Northeast Women's Hockey League (NEWHL)
- 2024:
  - SUNY Brockport and SUNY Geneseo left the SUNYAC to join the Empire 8 Athletic Conference (Empire 8) after the 2023–24 academic year; while SUNY Brockport remained in the league as an associate member for men's wrestling.
  - SUNY Canton upgraded as a full member for all sports (with SUNY Morrisville following suit) in the 2024–25 academic year.
  - Five institutions joined the SUNYAC as associate members, all effective in the 2024–25 academic year:
    - Alfred State College, Hilbert College and Pennsylvania State University at Erie, The Behrend College (a.k.a. Penn State–Behrend) and the State University of New York at Cobleskill (SUNY Cobleskill) for men's and women's indoor and outdoor track & field
    - and the State University of New York at Delhi (SUNY Delhi) for men's and women's indoor track & field
- 2025:
  - Ten institutions will join the SUNYAC as associate members (and/or add other single sports into their associate memberships), all effective in the 2025–26 academic year:
    - Elmira College for men's wrestling
    - Hobart College and Skidmore College for men's ice hockey
    - Pennsylvania State University at Altoona (a.k.a. Penn State–Altoona), Penn State–Behrend and the University of Pittsburgh at Bradford for men's and women's swimming & diving
    - Salisbury University for field hockey
    - SUNY Cobleskill and SUNY Delhi for men's and women's cross country
    - and William Smith College for women's ice hockey
- 2026:
  - SUNY New Paltz left the SUNYAC to join the New Jersey Athletic Conference (NJAC) at the end of the 2025–26 academic year.
  - Alfred State, SUNY Cobleskill and SUNY Delhi upgraded as full members of the SUNYAC for all sports, beginning the 2026–27 academic year.

== Member schools ==
=== Current members ===
The SUNYAC currently has ten full members, all are public schools:

Institution	Location (Note: All cities are located within the State of New York.)	Founded	Affiliation	Enrollment	Nickname	Joined (Note: Represents the calendar year when fall sports competition begins.)	Colors
State University of New York Alfred State College (Alfred State)	Alfred	1908	Public (Note: Part of the State University of New York System.)	3,500	Pioneers	2026 (Note: Alfred State has competed as an associate member of the SUNYAC for men's and women's indoor and outdoor track & field since the 2024–25 school year, before gaining full membership in 2026–27.)	
State University of New York Buffalo State University (Buffalo State)	Buffalo	1871	Public	8,339	Bengals	1958	
State University of New York at Canton (SUNY Canton)	Canton	1906	Public	3,122	Roos	2024 (Note: Affiliate member of the SUNYAC for women's ice hockey since 2023.)	
State University of New York at Cobleskill (SUNY Cobleskill)	Cobleskill	1911	Public	2,087	Fighting Tigers	2026 (Note: SUNY Cobleskill has competed as an associate member of the SUNYAC for men's and women's indoor and outdoor track & field since the 2024–25 school year, and in men's and women's cross country since 2025–26, before gaining full membership in 2026–27.)	
State University of New York at Cortland (SUNY Cortland)	Cortland	1868	Public	6,832	Red Dragons	1958	
State University of New York at Delhi (SUNY Delhi)	Delhi	1913	Public	3,088	Broncos	2026 (Note: SUNY Delhi has competed as an associate member of the SUNYAC for men's and women's indoor track & field since the 2024–25 school year, and in men's and women's cross country since 2025–26, before gaining full membership in 2026–27.)	
State University of New York at Fredonia (SUNY Fredonia)	Fredonia	1826	Public	3,780	Blue Devils	1959	
State University of New York at Morrisville (SUNY Morrisville)	Morrisville	1908	Public	2,486	Mustangs	2007; 2024 (Note: Full member of the SUNYAC from 2007–08 to 2008–09; affiliate member for field hockey and men's ice hockey since 2009 and women's ice hockey since 2023)	
State University of New York at Oneonta (SUNY Oneonta)	Oneonta	1889	Public	6,733	Red Dragons	1958	
State University of New York at Oswego (SUNY Oswego)	Oswego	1861	Public	7,636	Lakers	1958	
State University of New York at Plattsburgh (SUNY Plattsburgh)	Plattsburgh	1889	Public	5,257	Cardinals	1958	
State University of New York at Potsdam (SUNY Potsdam)	Potsdam	1816	Public	3,098	Bears	1958	

=== Affiliate members ===
The SUNYAC currently has 14 affiliate members, half of them are private schools:

Institution	Location	Founded	Affiliation	Enrollment	Nickname	Joined (Note: Represents the calendar year when fall sports competition begins.)	SUNYAC sport(s)	Primary conference
Elmira College	Elmira, New York	1855	Nonsectarian	768	Soaring Eagles	2025	Men's wrestling	Empire 8 (E8)
Hilbert College	Hamburg, New York	1957	Catholic (Franciscan)	1,100	Hawks	2024	Men's indoor track & field	Allegheny Mountain (AMCC)
Hilbert College	Hamburg, New York	1957	Catholic (Franciscan)	1,100	Hawks	2024	Men's outdoor track & field	Allegheny Mountain (AMCC)
Hilbert College	Hamburg, New York	1957	Catholic (Franciscan)	1,100	Hawks	2024	Women's indoor track & field	Allegheny Mountain (AMCC)
Hilbert College	Hamburg, New York	1957	Catholic (Franciscan)	1,100	Hawks	2024	Women's outdoor track & field	Allegheny Mountain (AMCC)
Hobart College	Geneva, New York	1822	Nonsectarian	2,337	Statesmen	2025	Men's ice hockey	Liberty (LL)
Ithaca College	Ithaca, New York	1892	Nonsectarian	6,769	Bombers	2023	Men's wrestling	Liberty (LL)
Penn State Altoona	Logan Township, Pennsylvania	1939	Public (Note: Part of the Pennsylvania State System of Higher Education (PASSHE).)	3,800	Lions	2025	Men's swimming & diving	Allegheny Mountain (AMCC)
Penn State Altoona	Logan Township, Pennsylvania	1939	Public	3,800	Lions	2025	Women's swimming & diving	Allegheny Mountain (AMCC)
Penn State Erie, The Behrend College	Erie, Pennsylvania	1948	Public	4,700	Lions	2024	Men's indoor track & field	Allegheny Mountain (AMCC)
Penn State Erie, The Behrend College	Erie, Pennsylvania	1948	Public	4,700	Lions	2024	Men's outdoor track & field	Allegheny Mountain (AMCC)
Penn State Erie, The Behrend College	Erie, Pennsylvania	1948	Public	4,700	Lions	2024	Women's indoor track & field	Allegheny Mountain (AMCC)
Penn State Erie, The Behrend College	Erie, Pennsylvania	1948	Public	4,700	Lions	2024	Women's outdoor track & field	Allegheny Mountain (AMCC)
Penn State Erie, The Behrend College	Erie, Pennsylvania	1948	Public	4,700	Lions	2025	Men's swimming & diving	Allegheny Mountain (AMCC)
Penn State Erie, The Behrend College	Erie, Pennsylvania	1948	Public	4,700	Lions	2025	Women's swimming & diving	Allegheny Mountain (AMCC)
University of Pittsburgh at Bradford	Bradford, Pennsylvania	1963	Public	1,502	Panthers	2025	Men's swimming & diving	Allegheny Mountain (AMCC)
University of Pittsburgh at Bradford	Bradford, Pennsylvania	1963	Public	1,502	Panthers	2025	Women's swimming & diving	Allegheny Mountain (AMCC)
Rochester Institute of Technology (RIT)	Henrietta, New York	1829	Nonsectarian	18,000	Tigers	2023	Men's wrestling	Liberty (LL)
St. John Fisher University	Rochester, New York	1948	Nonsectarian	3,610	Cardinals	2023	Men's wrestling	Empire 8 (E8)
Salisbury University	Salisbury, Maryland	1925	Public	8,657	Sea Gulls	2025	Field hockey	Coast to Coast (C2C)
Skidmore College	Saratoga Springs, New York	1903	Nonsectarian	2,500	Thoroughbreds	2025	Men's ice hockey	Liberty (LL)
State University of New York at Brockport (SUNY Brockport) (Note: SUNY Brockport was a full member of the SUNYAC from 1958–59 to 2023–24.)	Brockport, New York	1867	Public (Note: Part of the State University of New York System.)	7,924	Golden Eagles	2024	Men's wrestling	Empire 8 (E8)
Utica University	Utica, New York	1946	Nonsectarian	4,614	Pioneers	2023	Men's wrestling	Empire 8 (E8)
William Smith College	Geneva, New York	1908	Nonsectarian	2,229	Herons	2025	Women's ice hockey	Liberty (LL)

=== Future affiliate members ===
Institution	Location	Founded	Affiliation	Enrollment	Nickname	Joining (Note: Represents the calendar year when fall sports competition begins.)	SUNYAC sport(s)	Primary conference
Keuka College	Keuka Park, New York	1890	Baptist	1,535	Wolves	2027	Field hockey	Empire 8 (Allegheny Mountain (AMCC) in 2027)
Saint Francis University	Loretto, Pennsylvania	1847	Catholic (Franciscan)	2,111	Red Wolves	2028	Field hockey	Presidents'

=== Former members ===
The SUNYAC had seven former full members, all were public schools:

Institution	Location (Note: All cities are located within the State of New York.)	Founded	Affiliation	Enrollment	Nickname	Joined (Note: Represents the calendar year when fall sports competition begins.)	Left (Note: Represents the calendar year when spring sports competition ends.)	Current conference
University at Albany (Note: Also known as the State University of New York at Albany.) (SUNY Albany)	Albany	1844	Public (Note: Part of the State University of New York System.)	17,500	Great Danes	1958	1995	America East (AmEast) (Note: Currently an NCAA Division I athletic conference.)
Binghamton University (Note: Also known as the State University of New York at Binghamton.) (SUNY Binghamton)	Vestal	1946	Public	14,713	Bearcats	1973	1997	America East (AmEast)
University at Buffalo (Note: Also known as the State University of New York at Buffalo.) (SUNY Buffalo)	Buffalo	1846	Public	28,601	Bulls	1978	1988	Mid-American (MAC)
State University of New York at Brockport (Note: SUNY Brockport remains in the SUNYAC as an affiliate member for men's wrestling.) (SUNY Brockport)	Brockport	1867	Public	7,924	Golden Eagles	1958	2024	Empire 8 (E8)
State University of New York at Geneseo (SUNY Geneseo)	Geneseo	1871	Public	4,910	Knights	1959	2024	Empire 8 (E8)
State University of New York at New Paltz (SUNY New Paltz)	New Paltz	1828	Public	7,489	Hawks	1958	2026	New Jersey (NJAC)
State University of New York Institute of Technology (SUNY Poly)	Marcy	1966	Public	2,870	Wildcats	1991	2008	Empire 8 (E8)

=== Membership timeline ===
Full member Associate member (sport)

- Buffalo left to join the East Coast Conference while reclassifying to Division I and the Mid-American Conference
- Albany and Binghamton left to join the New England Collegiate Conference while reclassifying to Division I and the America East Conference
- SUNYIT left to join the North Eastern Athletic Conference
- Morrisville State (SUNY Morrisville) left to join the North Eastern Athletic Conference

== Conference facilities ==
Institution	Basketball Arena	Capacity	Football Stadium	Capacity	Ice Hockey Arena	Capacity
Buffalo State	Buffalo State Sports Arena	3,500	Coyer Field	3,000	Buffalo State Ice Arena	1,800
Cortland	Whitney T. Corey Gymnasium	3,500	SUNY Cortland Stadium Complex	6,500	Alumni Arena	2,500
Fredonia	Steele Hall Fieldhouse	3,300	Non-Football School	N/A	Steele Hall Ice Arena	1,100
Oneonta	Dewar Arena	4,000	Non-Football School	N/A	Non-Ice Hockey School	N/A
Oswego	Max Ziel Gymnasium	3,500	Non-Football School	N/A	Campus Center Ice Arena	2,500
Plattsburgh	Memorial Hall	1,000	Non-Football School	N/A	Ronald B. Stafford Ice Arena	1,924
Potsdam	Jerry Welsh Gymnasium	3,600	Non-Football School	N/A	Maxcy Ice Arena	2,500

== Sports ==
The SUNYAC sponsors intercollegiate athletic competition in the following sports:

Conference sports
Sport	Men's	Women's
Baseball	✓	
Basketball	✓	✓
Cross country	✓	✓
Field hockey		✓
Ice Hockey	✓	✓
Lacrosse	✓	✓
Soccer	✓	✓
Softball		✓
Swimming & Diving	✓	✓
Tennis		✓
Track & Field (Indoor)	✓	✓
Track & Field (Outdoor)	✓	✓
Volleyball		✓
Wrestling	✓	

=== Men's sponsored sports by school ===
School	Baseball	Basketball	Cross Country	Ice Hockey	Lacrosse	Soccer	Swimming & Diving	Track & Field (Indoor)	Track & Field (Outdoor)	Wrestling	Total SUNYAC Sports
Alfred State	✓	✓	✓	✗	✓	✓	✗	✓	✓	✓	8
Buffalo State	✗	✓	✓	✓	✗	✓	✗	✓	✓	✗	6
Canton	✓	✓	✓	✓	✓	✓	✗	✗	✗	✗	6
Cobleskill	✓	✓	✓	✗	✓	✓	✗	✓	✓	✗	7
Cortland	✓	✓	✓	✓	✓	✓	✓	✓	✓	✓	10
Delhi	✗	✓	✓	✗	✓	✓	✓	✓	✓	✗	7
Fredonia	✓	✓	✓	✓	✗	✓	✓	✓	✓	✗	8
Morrisville	✗	✓	✓	✓	✓	✓	✗	✓	✓	✗	7
Oneonta	✓	✓	✓	✗	✓	✓	✓	✓	✓	✓	9
Oswego	✓	✓	✓	✓	✓	✓	✓	✓	✓	✓	10
Plattsburgh	✓	✓	✓	✓	✓	✓	✗	✓	✓	✗	8
Potsdam	✗	✓	✓	✓	✓	✓	✓	✓	✓	✗	8
Totals	8	12	12	8+2 (Note: Affiliate members Hobart and Skidmore)	10	12	6+3 (Note: Affiliate Members Penn State Altoona, Penn State Behrend and Pittsburgh–Bradford)	11+1 (Note: Affiliate member Hilbert.)	11+1 (Note: Affiliate members Hilbert.)	4+2 (Note: Affiliate members Ithaca and RIT)	94+9

==== Men's varsity sports not sponsored by the SUNYAC ====
School	Equestrian	Football	Golf	Tennis	Volleyball
Alfred State	No	Empire 8	No	No	No
Buffalo State	No	Liberty League	No	No	AMCC
Canton	No	No	Empire 8	No	No
Cortland	No	Empire 8	No	No	No
Morrisville	IHSA	Empire 8	No	No	No
Oneonta	No	No	No	Empire 8	No
Oswego	IHSA	No	Empire 8	Empire 8	No
Potsdam	No	No	No	No	CNE

=== Women's sponsored sports by school ===
School	Basketball	Cross Country	Field Hockey	Ice Hockey	Lacrosse	Soccer	Softball	Swimming & Diving	Tennis	Track & Field (Indoor)	Track & Field (Outdoor)	Volleyball	Total SUNYAC Sports
Alfred State	✓	✓	✗	✗	✓	✓	✓	✗	✗	✓	✓	✓	8
Buffalo State	✓	✓	✗	✓	✓	✓	✓	✗	✗	✓	✓	✓	9
Canton	✓	✓	✗	✓	✓	✓	✓	✗	✗	✗	✗	✓	7
Cobleskill	✓	✓	✗	✗	✗	✓	✓	✗	✗	✓	✓	✓	7
Cortland	✓	✓	✓	✓	✓	✓	✓	✓	✓	✓	✓	✓	12
Delhi	✓	✓	✗	✗	✗	✓	✓	✓	✓	✓	✓	✓	8
Fredonia	✓	✓	✗	✗	✓	✓	✓	✓	✓	✓	✓	✓	10
Morrisville	✓	✓	✓	✓	✓	✓	✓	✗	✗	✓	✓	✓	10
Oneonta	✓	✓	✓	✗	✓	✓	✓	✓	✓	✓	✓	✓	11
Oswego	✓	✓	✓	✓	✓	✓	✓	✓	✓	✓	✓	✓	12
Plattsburgh	✓	✓	✗	✓	✓	✓	✓	✗	✓	✓	✓	✓	10
Potsdam	✓	✓	✗	✓	✓	✓	✓	✓	✗	✓	✓	✓	10
Totals	12	12	4	7+1 (Note: Affiliate member William Smith)	10	12	12	6+3 (Note: Affiliate Members Penn State Altoona, Penn State Behrend and Pittsburgh–Bradford)	6	11+1 (Note: Affiliate member Hilbert.)	11+1 (Note: Affiliate member Hilbert.)	12	114+6

==== Women's varsity sports not sponsored by the SUNYAC ====
School	Acrobatics & Tumbling	Equestrian	Golf	Gymnastics	Wrestling
Buffalo State	Yes	No	No	No	IND
Canton	No	No	NWGC	No	No
Cortland	No	No	NWGC	NCGA	No
Morrisville	No	IHSA	No	No	No

== See also ==
- Hudson Valley Intercollegiate Athletic Conference
- Mid Hudson Conference
- Yankee Small College Conference
