= University of Pittsburgh at Greensburg =

Public university in Hempfield Township, Pennsylvania, U.S.

Coordinates: 40°16′36″N 79°31′54″W

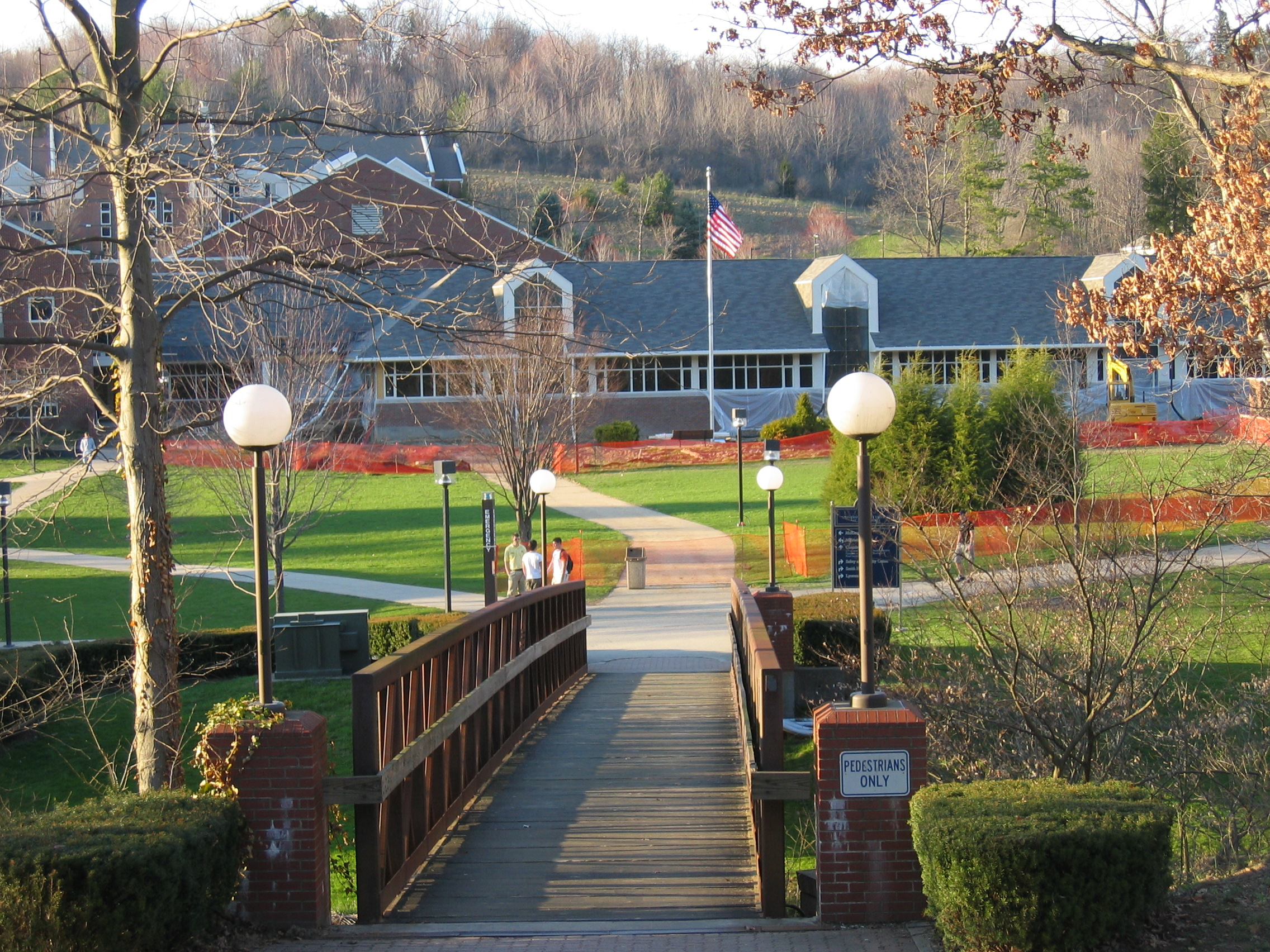
- Bridge across Slate Run
- Motto: Veritas et Virtus (Latin)
- Motto in English: Truth and Virtue
- Type: State-related liberal arts regional campus
- Established: 1963
- Endowment: $5.04 million
- President: Robert Gregerson
- Faculty: 96
- Students: 1,439
- Location: Hempfield Township, Westmoreland County, Pennsylvania, U.S.
- Campus: Suburban, 219 acres (89 ha)
- Colors: Blue and gold
- Nickname: Bobcats
- Sporting affiliations: NCAA Division III; AMCC
- Mascot: Bruiser the Bobcat
- Website: greensburg.pitt.edu

The University of Pittsburgh at Greensburg (Pitt-Greensburg or UPG) is a state-related liberal arts college in Hempfield Township, Westmoreland County, Pennsylvania. It is a baccalaureate degree-granting regional campus of the University of Pittsburgh. Opened in 1963, Pitt-Greensburg was granted four-year degree-granting status in 1988. As of 2020, Pitt-Greensburg had 1,439 undergraduates and 96 faculty.

== History ==
Pitt-Greensburg opened in September 1963, following a request of area school superintendents for a branch campus of the University of Pittsburgh. Pitt-Greensburg began as a two-year institution with instruction in nine areas of study, 15 faculty, 56 full-time, and 156 part-time students. The school was originally located in the Vogle Building, a former private elementary school and Greensburg School System administrative building located at 122 North Maple Avenue in downtown Greensburg across from St. Clair Park. Fine arts classes were originally taught at the Westmoreland Museum of American Art, physical education was held at the Greensburg YMCA, and laboratory classes were held in what is now Greensburg Salem Middle School. In 1964, the university purchased the 104-acre (0.42 km^{2}) Charles McKenna Lynch estate in Hempfield. At first, faculty offices and classrooms were split between Greensburg and Lynch Hall, a former residence on the Lynch estate campus. In 1976, the entire Pitt-Greensburg campus moved to the Hempfield location on the former Lynch estate. Until 1988, when it received 4-year degree-granting status, Pitt-Greensburg served as a two-year feeder school to the main campus as the University of Pittsburgh in the Oakland section of Pittsburgh. By 1989, Pitt-Greensburg had its first graduating class. In 1999, a distinctive feature of Pitt-Greensburg opened when the first of three Academic Villages (Behavioral Sciences, Natural Sciences, and Humanities), where high-achieving students live in residences based on their majors and participate in after-class events geared to those disciplines. As (2018), the campus boasts 29 majors, 24 minors, and four certificate programs.

Five presidents have led the campus since its founding: Al Smith (1963–1980), George Chambers (1980–1996), Frank Cassell (1997–2007), Sharon P. Smith (2007-2019), and Robert Gregerson who became Pitt-Greensburg's fifth president on July 1, 2019.

== Location and campus ==
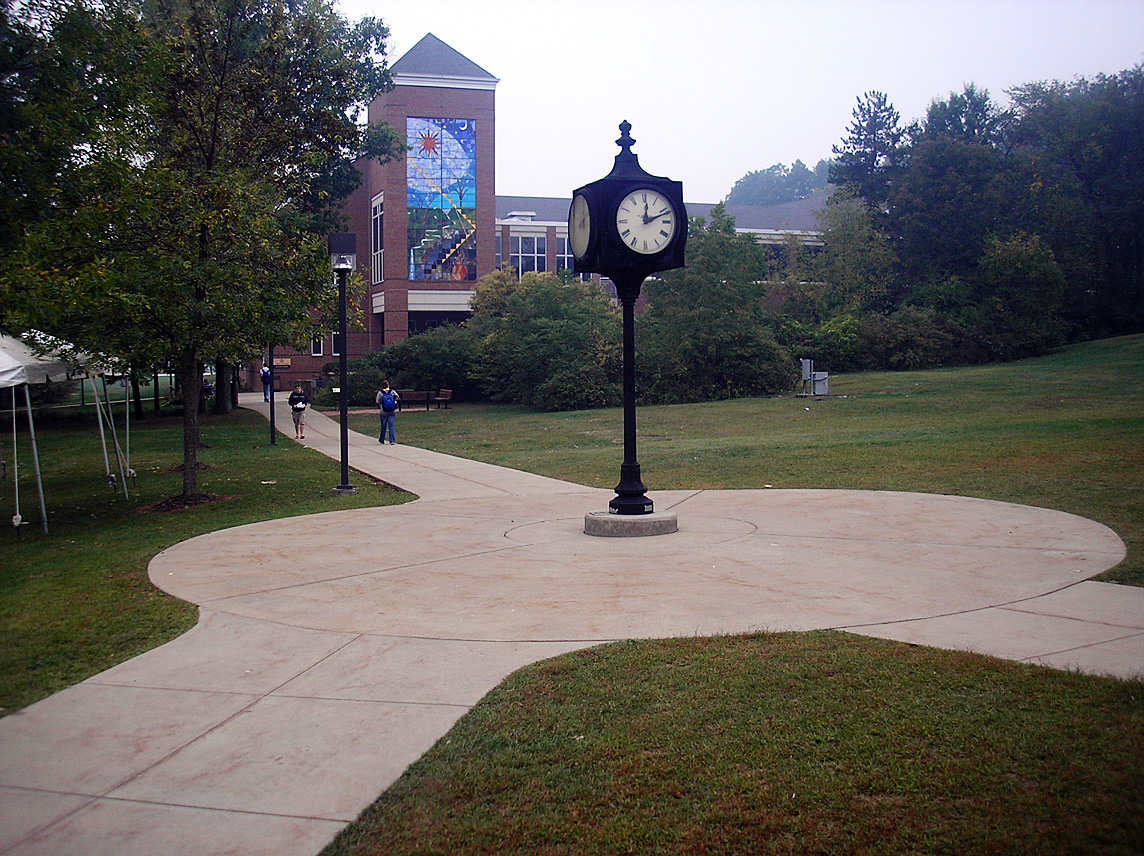
The campus of the University of Pittsburgh Greensburg. The Millstein Library's Chew Memorial Window, a 32 by 14 foot leaded glass window titled Upward to the Light by Terry Bengel, can be seen behind the clock

Pitt-Greensburg is located two miles (3 km) south of the center of Greensburg, Pennsylvania, a city located in Westmoreland County, and approximately 33 miles (53 km) to the southeast of Pittsburgh. Since 1976, the university has been centralized at its current location on the former estate of Charles McKenna Lynch in suburban Hempfield. The entire campus consists of 22 buildings on 219 acres (0.89 km^{2}).

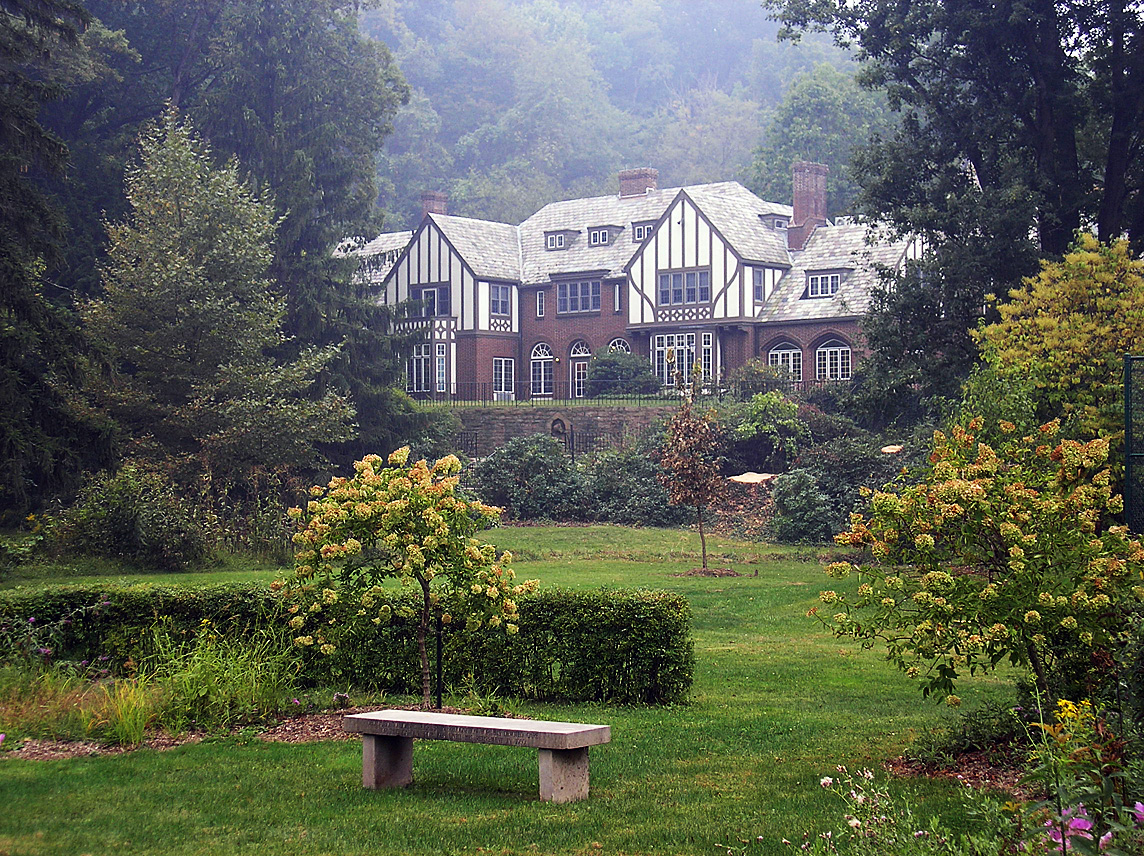
Lynch Hall, designed as a residence for Commander Charles McKenna Lynch in 1923 by architect Paul A. Bartholomew, was redesigned as the first building of the Pitt-Greensburg campus in 1965 by Bartholomew's architectural firm and now houses the main Pitt-Greensburg administrative offices.

Many student residences consist of "Houses" in the Academic Village section (Apollo, Athena, Benjamin Franklin, Margaret Mead, Selene, and Thurgood Marshall), with Village Hall as the Villages' social hub. The various academic villages integrate curricular and extracurricular student experiences and each have their own student council. Each village must be applied to in order to live there, and they are organized around four themes including Behavioral Sciences, Humanities, International, and Natural Science and New Technologies. Other residence Halls are also located in College Hall and Robertshaw Hall, Westmoreland Hall and the University Court.

Other campus facilities include three classroom buildings (Powers, Smith, and McKenna—which also serves as the computer center), Millstein Library, Chambers Hall, the administration building (Lynch Hall), the admissions office (Rossetti House) and the Ridilla Athletic Fields. A new classroom and office building named after former campus president Frank Cassell has recently opened and has been awarded LEED gold certification, being the first building on campus to achieve such designation. The campus also features a nature trail and a small creek (Slate Run) that runs through the center of campus.

== Academics ==
Pitt-Greensburg offers 29 bachelor's degree programs, 24 minors, and numerous pre-professional and certificate programs. The University of Pittsburgh, including Pitt-Greensburg and its other regional campuses, is accredited through the Middle States Association of Colleges and Schools’ Commission on Higher Education.

A school-wide honor society, the Ben Franklin Society, was organized in 2008 for sophomores, juniors, and seniors with a cumulative grade point average of 3.75 or higher. The society functions to help students identify, prepare and apply for prestigious fellowships and scholarships. Another honor society, the Da Vinci Society, also exists for juniors and seniors selected for their academic excellence, leadership, service, and international experience. Other honor societies also exist on campus for specific programs of study. In addition, Academic Villages, for which grades and participation are evaluated for admittance, act as living and learning communities for students with similar academic interests.

== Athletics ==
Pitt-Greensburg competes athletically as a member of NCAA Division III and is a charter member of the Allegheny Mountain Collegiate Conference. Men's athletic programs include basketball, soccer, baseball, tennis, golf, and cross country. Women's programs consist of basketball, soccer, softball, volleyball, golf, cross country. Pitt-Greensburg also has an intramural program with flag football, racquetball, and billiards. On January 31, 2003, the men's and women's basketball teams of the Pitt-Greensburg and the University of Pittsburgh at Bradford held a doubleheader at the Petersen Events Center on the University of Pittsburgh's main campus in the Oakland section of Pittsburgh in celebration of both school's 40th anniversaries.

== Gallery ==
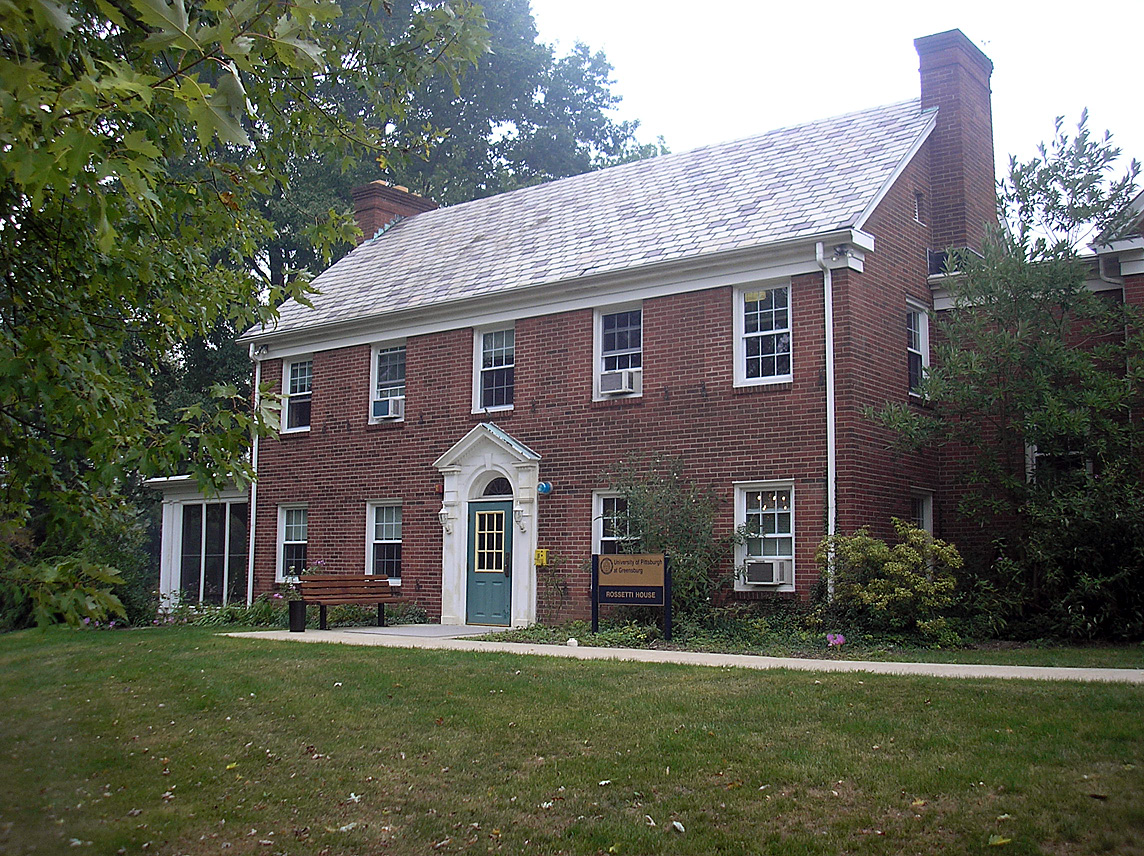
Rossetti House, the former historic Sears home of Mary Lynch Quinn, formerly served as a residence hall for international studies students and now houses the Pitt-Greensburg admissions office

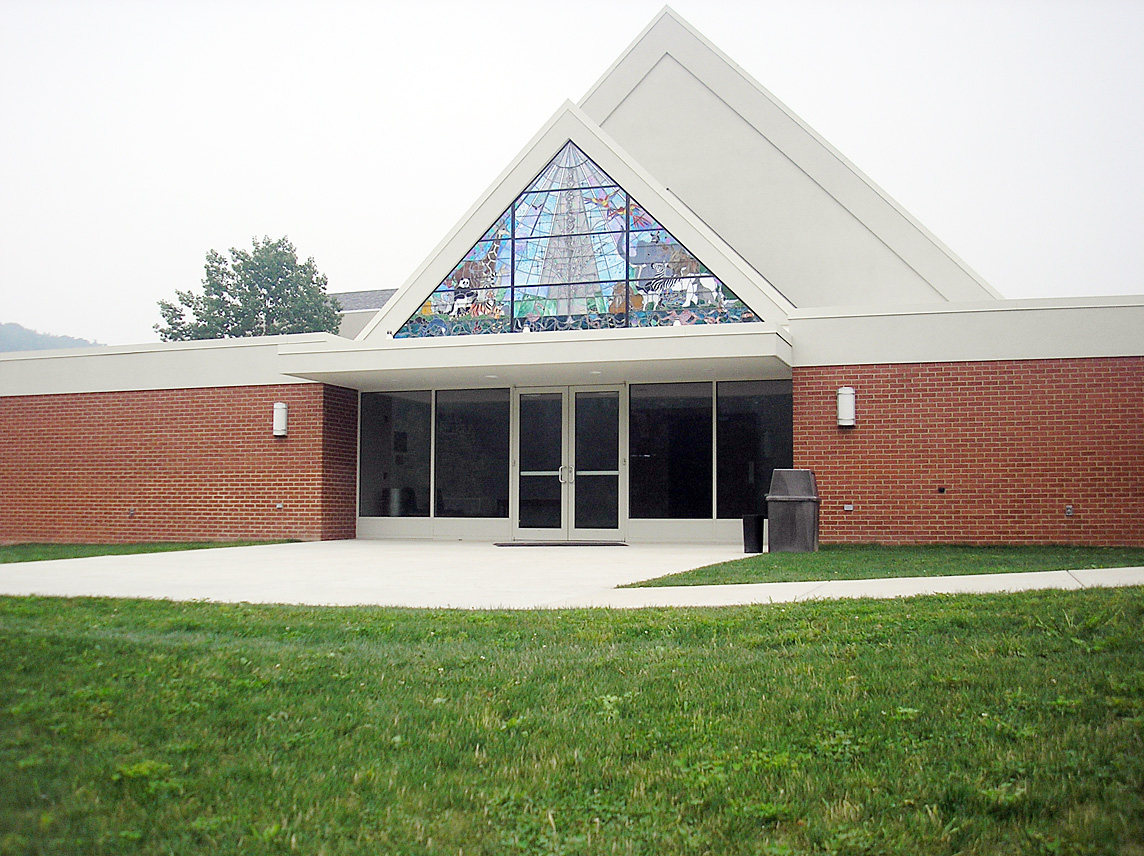
Mary Lou Campana Chapel and Lecture Center contains lead, glass, steel and brass windows entitled The Fountain of Life by Terry Bengel

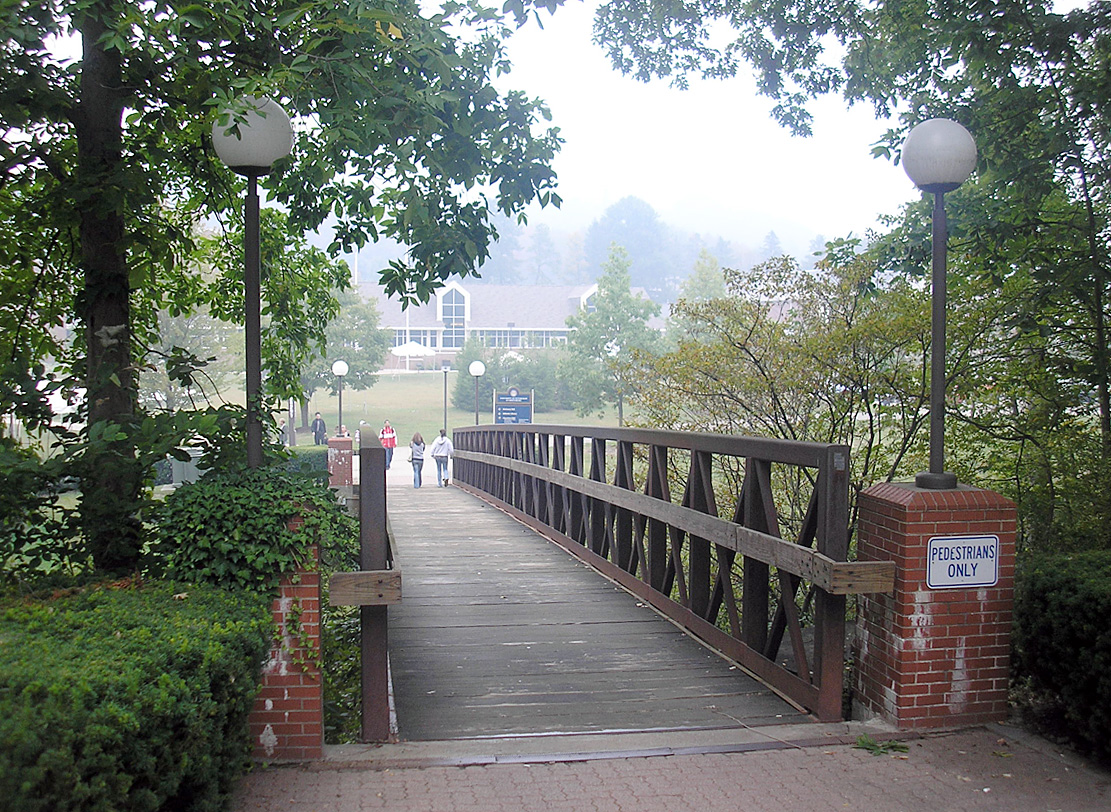
Pedestrian bridge over Slate Run creek heading towards Chambers Hall

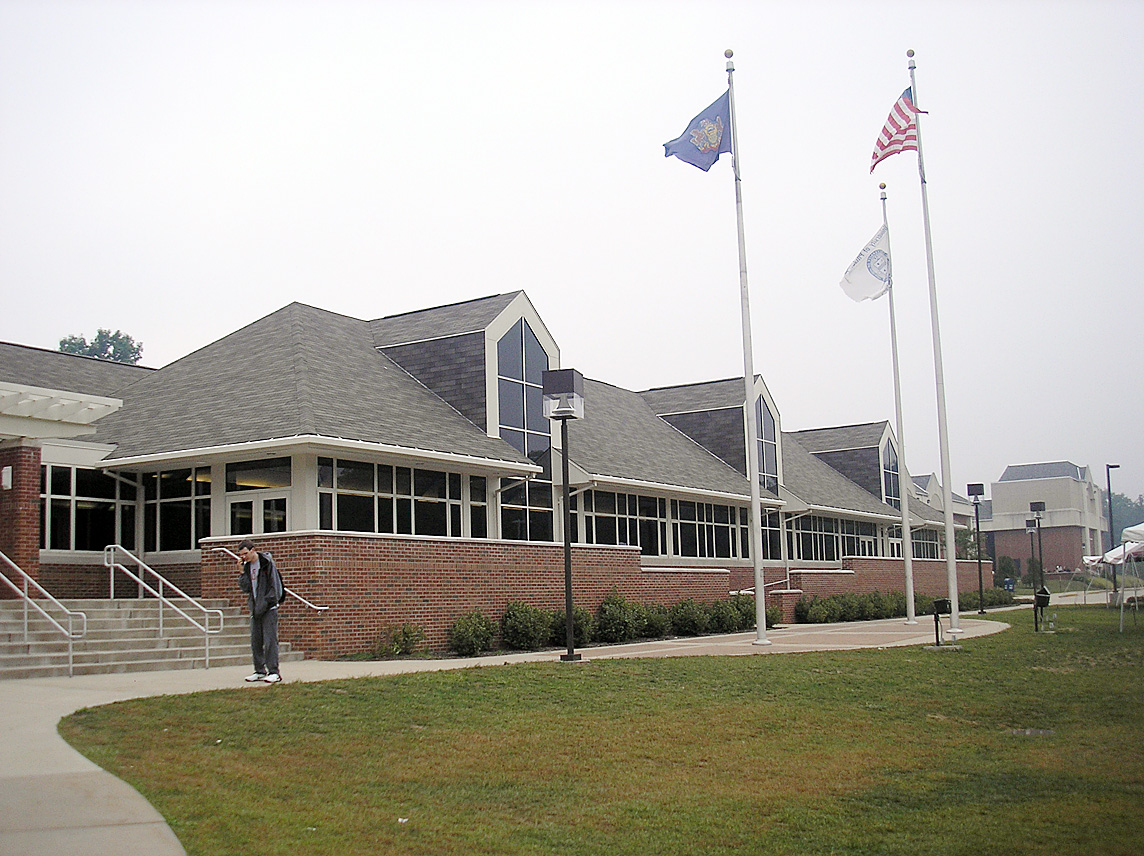
Chambers Hall contains a dining hall, athletic facilities, book store, health center, student services and information desk. It features a stained glass window of the university seal by Terry Bengel

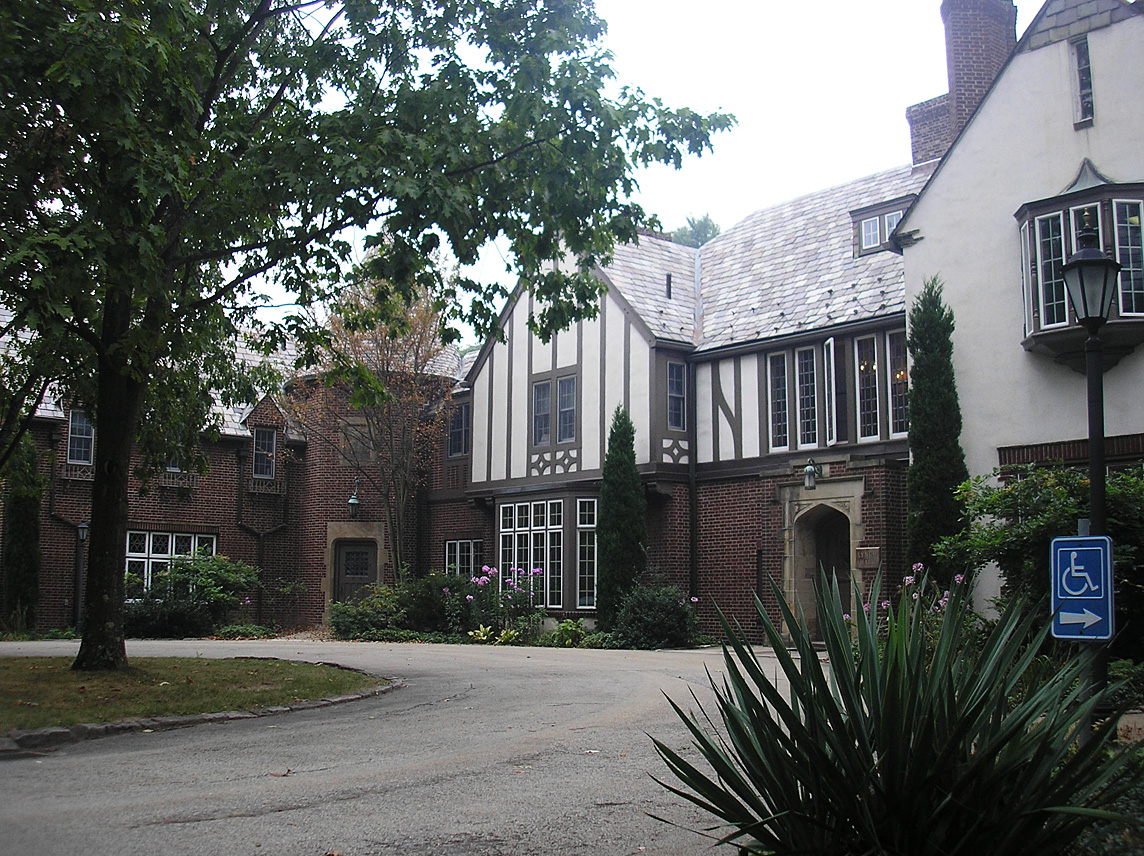
Lynch Hall

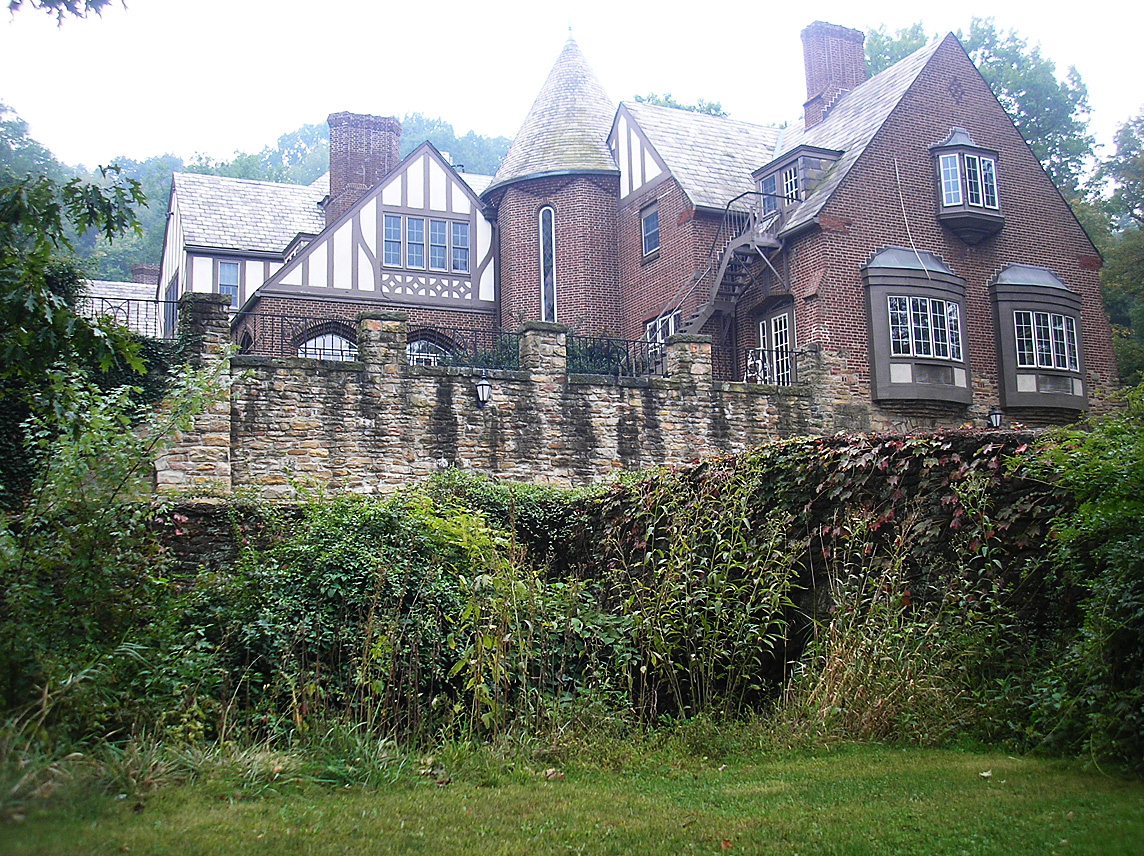
Lynch Hall as viewed from Ridilla Athletic Fields

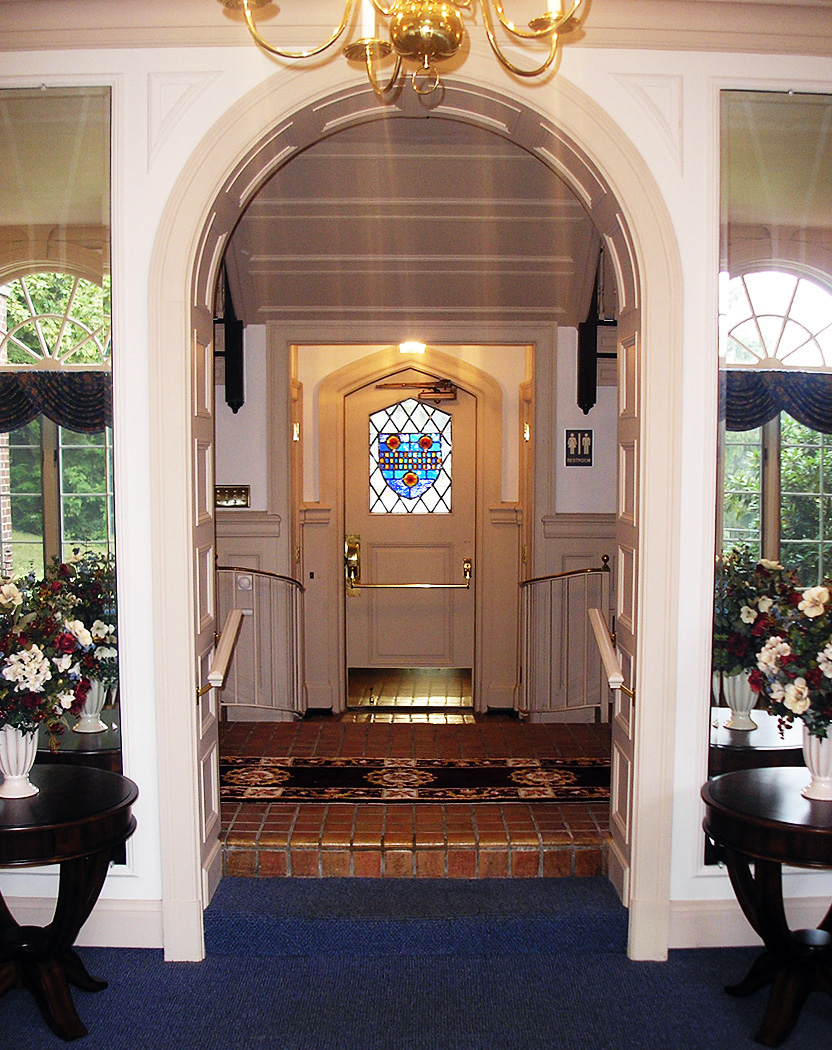
Lobby inside Lynch Hall
