= Allegheny Mountain Collegiate Conference =

Northeastern US intercollegiate conference

- Association: NCAA
- Founded: 1997
- Commissioner: Jeromy Yetter
- Sports fielded: 18; men's: 9; women's: 9
- Division: Division III
- No. of teams: 8 (9 in 2027)
- Headquarters: North Boston, New York
- Region: Northeastern United States
- Website: www.amccsports.org

Locations
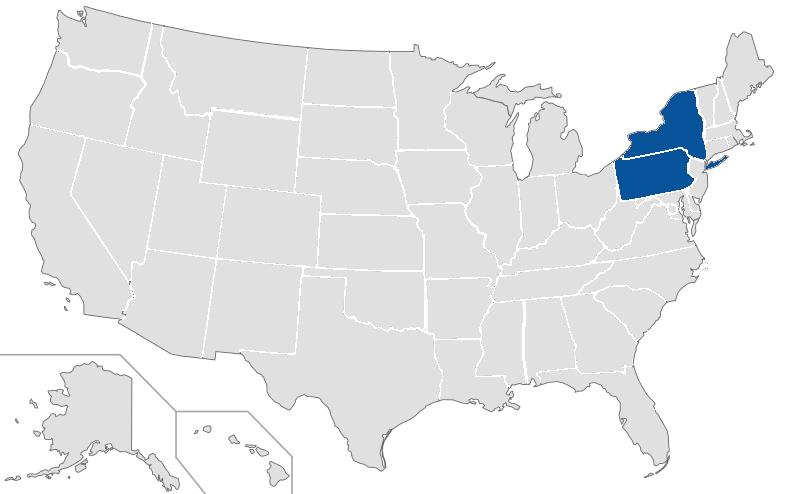

The Allegheny Mountain Collegiate Conference (AMCC) is an intercollegiate athletic conference affiliated with the NCAA's Division III. Member institutions are located in the northeastern United States in the states of New York and Pennsylvania.

== History ==
Allegheny Mountain Collegiate Conference
Location of AMCC members: full future

=== Recent changes ===
The most recent changes to conference membership took place in 2020, with two full members and one associate member leaving. D'Youville College began a transition to NCAA Division II in the East Coast Conference (ECC), and Franciscan University of Steubenville completed a multi-year transition to full membership in the D-III Presidents' Athletic Conference (PAC).

On January 24, 2020, Wittenberg University, which became a men's volleyball associate in 2018–19, left the AMCC to return to the Midwest Collegiate Volleyball League, where it had played from the start of its program in the 2015–16 school year through 2017–18.

On August 26, 2021, Medaille College joined the entirely New York-based Empire 8 Athletic Conference (Empire 8), effective the 2022–23 school year; at the same time, it remained an AMCC associate in women's bowling. On May 17, 2023, Medaille announced it would close at the end of the 2023 spring semester (2022–23 academic year).

On February 9, 2022, Wells College, current affiliate member for swimming and diving, added men's volleyball to compete in the AMCC as an affiliate, effective the 2023 spring season (2022–23 school year). Later, the following season, Wells announced to become a full AMCC member, effective 2023–24.

On July 6, 2022, Carlow University would join the AMCC as a provisional member in the 2023–24 school year from the River States Conference (RSC) of the National Association of Intercollegiate Athletics (NAIA), but spent its exploratory year in the prior NAIA season.

On December 13, 2022, the PAC, primary home of AMCC men's volleyball associates Geneva, Saint Vincent, and Thiel, announced it would begin sponsoring that sport in the 2025 spring season of the 2024–25 academic year. Accordingly, all three will leave the AMCC after the 2024 spring season.

On June 6, 2023, the PAC announced that current AMCC men's volleyball associate Hiram would move that sport to the PAC after the 2024 season.

On June 26, 2023, the AMCC announced that it would add Buffalo State University and Houghton University as men's volleyball associates for the 2025 spring season (2024–25 school year). At the time of announcement, both were preparing to start men's volleyball programs in 2023–24.

On April 29, 2024, Wells announced that it would cease operations at the end of the 2023–24 academic year.

On June 5, 2025, Alfred State College accepted an invitation to join the State University of New York Athletic Conference (SUNYAC), beginning the 2026–27 academic year; thus leaving the AMCC with 8 full members.

=== Chronological timeline ===
The old logo for the AMCC

- 1997 – In 1997, the Allegheny Mountain Collegiate Conference (AMCC) was founded. Charter members included Frostburg State University, La Roche College (now La Roche University), Lake Erie College, Pennsylvania State University at Erie, the Behrend College (a.k.a. Penn State–Erie or Penn State–Behrend), the University of Pittsburgh at Bradford (a.k.a. Pitt–Bradford) and the University of Pittsburgh at Greensburg (a.k.a. Pitt–Greensburg), beginning the 1997–98 academic year.
- 1998 – Pennsylvania State University at Altoona (a.k.a. Penn State–Altoona) joined the AMCC in the 1998–99 academic year.
- 2005 – Hilbert College and Medaille College joined the AMCC in the 2005–06 academic year.
- 2006 – Mount Aloysius College joined the AMCC in the 2006–07 academic year.
- 2008:
  - Lake Erie left the AMCC to join the NCAA Division II ranks of the National Collegiate Athletic Association (NCAA) as an Independent (which would then later join the Great Lakes Intercollegiate Athletic Conference (GLIAC) a few seasons later, beginning the 2010–11 school year) after the 2007–08 academic year.
  - D'Youville College (now D'Youville University) and Franciscan University of Steubenville joined the AMCC in the 2008–09 academic year.
- 2010:
  - Frostburg State left the AMCC to join the Capital Athletic Conference (CAC; now known as the Coast to Coast Athletic Conference) after the 2009–10 academic year.
  - Cabrini College (later Cabrini University) joined the AMCC as an associate member for men's and women's swimming & diving in the 2010–11 academic year.
- 2015 – New Jersey City University joined the AMCC as an associate member for women's bowling in the 2016 spring season (2015–16 academic year).
- 2016:
  - Thiel College joined the AMCC as an associate member for women's bowling in the 2017 spring season (2016–17 academic year).
  - Alfred State College joined the AMCC as an associate member for men's and women's swimming & diving and men's lacrosse in the 2016–17 academic year.
- 2017 – Hiram College joined the AMCC as an associate member for men's volleyball in the 2018 spring season (2017–18 academic year).
- 2018:
  - Thiel left the AMCC as an associate member for women's bowling after the 2018 spring season (2017–18 academic year).
  - Six institutions joined the AMCC as associate members (and/or added other single sports into their associate memberships), all effective in the 2019 spring season (2018–19 academic year):
    - Alfred State for baseball
    - Thiel, Geneva College and Wittenberg University for men's volleyball
    - Saint Vincent College for women's bowling
    - and the State University of New York at Delhi (SUNY Delhi) for men's & women's swimming & diving
- 2019:
  - Alfred State College upgraded as a full member for all sports in the 2019–20 academic year.
  - The AMCC and the Empire 8 Athletic Conference (Empire 8) had a joint partnership for men's and women's swimming & diving in the 2019–20 academic year. Therefore, Empire 8 members Alfred University, Hartwick College, Nazareth College of Rochester (now Nazareth University) and Utica College (now Utica University) joined essentially as AMCC associates; while the AMCC members are essentially Empire 8 associates.
- 2020:
  - Two institutions left the AMCC to join their respective new home primary conferences, both effective after of the 2019–20 academic year:
    - D'Youville to join the NCAA Division II ranks and the East Coast Conference (ECC)
    - and Franciscan to join the Presidents' Athletic Conference (PAC) as a full member, which was already a multi-sport associate member of that conference
  - Wittenberg left the AMCC as an associate member for men's volleyball to rejoin the Midwest Collegiate Volleyball League (MCVL).
  - Two institutions joined the AMCC as associate members (and/or added other single sports into their associate memberships), both effective in the 2020–21 academic year:
    - Saint Vincent for men's volleyball
    - and Wells College for men's and women's swimming & diving
- 2022:
  - Medaille left the AMCC after the 2021–22 academic year to join the Empire 8 Athletic Conference (Empire 8) after the 2021–22 academic year; while the school remained in the AMCC as an associate member for women's bowling and men's and women's swimming & diving.
  - Two institutions joined the AMCC as associate members (and/or added other single sports into their associate memberships), both effective in the 2023 spring season (2022–23 academic year):
    - William Smith College for women's bowling
    - and Wells for men's volleyball
- 2023
  - Former full member Medaille left the AMCC as an associate member for women's bowling after the 2023 spring season (2022–23 academic year); as the school ceased operations.
  - Carlow University joined the AMCC (with Wells upgrading as a full member for all sports) in the 2023–24 academic year.
  - Alvernia University joined the AMCC as an associate member for women's bowling in the 2024 spring season (2023–24 academic year).
- 2024:
  - Geneva, Hiram, Saint Vincent and Thiel left the AMCC as associate members for men's volleyball to join the PAC for that sport after the 2024 spring season (2023–24 academic year).
  - New Jersey City (NJCU) left the AMCC as an associate member for women's bowling after the 2024 spring season (2023–24 academic year).
  - Wells left the AMCC after the 2023–24 academic year; as the school ceased operations.
  - Buffalo State University and Houghton University joined the AMCC as associate members for men's volleyball in the 2025 spring season (2024–25 academic year).
  - Women's wrestling became an invitational conference sport, though without official status, in 2024–25. Full members Alfred State and Penn State Altoona were joined by Buffalo State and Hiram.
- 2025 – Women's wrestling became an official AMCC sport in the 2025–26 school year, with the four schools that participated in the 2025 AMCC invitational meet joined by new associates John Carroll University and Elmira College.
- 2026
  - Alfred State left the AMCC to join the State University of New York Athletic Conference (SUNYAC) effective with the 2026–27 academic year.
  - At the same time, men's volleyball affiliate Houghton left for its primary home of the Empire 8, which will elevate the sport to full NCAA championship status in the spring 2027 season. Houghton was replaced in AMCC men's volleyball by Hobart College, which will move that team from the disbanding United Volleyball Conference.
- 2027 – Keuka College will join the AMCC, beginning in the 2027–28 academic year.

== Member schools ==
=== Current members ===
The AMCC currently has eight full members, with four being part of Pennsylvania's Commonwealth System of Higher Education, made up of state-supported but privately chartered institutions, and four private institutions (all Catholic).

Institution	Location	Founded	Affiliation	Enrollment	Nickname	Colors	Joined (Note: Represents the calendar year when fall sports competition begins.)
Carlow University	Pittsburgh, Pennsylvania	1929	Catholic (R.S.M.)	2,416	Celtics		2023
Hilbert College	Hamburg, New York	1957	Catholic (Franciscan)	968	Hawks		2005
La Roche University	McCandless, Pennsylvania (Note: The campus mailing address is Pittsburgh.)	1963	Catholic (C.D.P.)	2,153	Redhawks		1997
Mount Aloysius College	Cresson, Pennsylvania	1853	Catholic (R.S.M.)	2,955	Mounties		2006
Penn State Altoona	Logan Township, Pennsylvania (Note: The campus mailing address is Altoona.)	1939	State-related	2,371	Lions		1998
Penn State Erie, The Behrend College (Penn State Behrend)	Erie, Pennsylvania	1948	State-related	3,336	Lions		1997
University of Pittsburgh at Bradford	Bradford, Pennsylvania	1963	State-related	1,009	Panthers		1997
University of Pittsburgh at Greensburg	Greensburg, Pennsylvania	1963	State-related	1,321	Bobcats		1997

=== Future members ===
The AMCC will have one new full member, a private school.

Institution	Location	Founded	Affiliation	Enrollment	Nickname	Colors	Joining (Note: Represents the calendar year when fall sports competition begins.)	Current conference
Keuka College	Keuka Park, New York	1890	Baptist	1,535	Wolves		2027	Empire 8

=== Associate members ===
The AMCC currently has eight associate members; all but one are private schools.

Institution	Location	Founded	Affiliation	Enrollment	Nickname	Joined (Note: Represents the calendar year when fall sports competition begins.)	Primary conference	AMCC sport(s)
Alvernia University	Reading, Pennsylvania	1958	Catholic (O.S.F.)	2,796	Golden Wolves	2023	MAC Commonwealth	Women's bowling
Buffalo State University	Buffalo, New York	1871	Public (Note: Part of the State University of New York System.)	6,188	Bengals	2024	S.U. New York (SUNYAC)	Men's volleyball
Buffalo State University	Buffalo, New York	1871	Public	6,188	Bengals	2025 (Note: Though not officially becoming an AMCC women's wrestling associate until the conference formally added that sport in 2025–26, it competed in the February 2025 AMCC invitational meet.)	S.U. New York (SUNYAC)	Women's wrestling
Elmira College	Elmira, New York	1855	Nonsectarian	786	Soaring Eagles	2025	Empire 8	Women's wrestling
Hiram College	Hiram, Ohio	1850	Disciples of Christ	1,061	Terriers	2025	Presidents'	Women's wrestling
Hobart College (Note: Hobart (men) and William Smith (women) are together the Colleges of the Seneca and usually grouped together, but they participate separately in athletics.)	Geneva, New York	1822	Episcopal	905	Statesmen	2026	Liberty (LL)	Men's volleyball
John Carroll University	University Heights, Ohio	1886	Catholic (Jesuit)	2,864	Blue Streaks	2025	North Coast	Women's wrestling
Saint Vincent College (Note: Saint Vincent competed in the AMCC as an associate member for men's volleyball from the 2019 to 2024 spring seasons (2018–19 to 2023–24 school years).)	Latrobe, Pennsylvania	1846	Catholic (O.S.B.)	1,440	Bearcats	2018	Presidents' (PAC)	Women's bowling
William Smith College	Geneva, New York	1908	Episcopal	1,841	Herons	2022	Liberty (LL)	Women's bowling

=== Former members ===
The AMCC has seven former full members, all but two are private schools.

Institution	Location	Founded	Affiliation	Enrollment	Nickname	Joined (Note: Represents the calendar year when fall sports competition begins.)	Left (Note: Represents the calendar year when spring sports competition ends.)	Current conference
Alfred State College	Alfred, New York	1908	Public (Note: Part of the State University of New York system)	3,781	Pioneers	2019 (Note: Alfred State competed in the AMCC as an associate member for men's and women's swimming & diving and men's lacrosse from 2016–17 to 2018–19; later joined for baseball from 2017–18 to 2018–19; before joining as a full member for all sports during the 2019–20 school year.)	2026	SUNYAC
D'Youville College (Note: Currently known as D'Youville University since 2022.)	Buffalo, New York	1946	Catholic (Grey Nuns)	2,556	Spartans (Note: D'Youville was nicknamed "Spartans" during its AMCC tenure. The school changed its nickname to "Saints" in 2020, at the same time it moved to Division II.)	2009	2020	East Coast (ECC) (Note: Currently an NCAA Division II athletic conference.)
Franciscan University of Steubenville	Steubenville, Ohio	1946	Catholic (T.O.R.)	3,976	Barons	2008	2019	Presidents' (PAC)
Frostburg State University	Frostburg, Maryland	1898	Public (Note: Part of the University System of Maryland.)	4,104	Bobcats	1997	2009	Mountain East (MEC)
Lake Erie College	Painesville, Ohio	1856	Nonsectarian	1,108	Storm	1997	2007	Great Midwest (G-MAC)
Medaille College (Note: Later known as Medaille University since 2022.)	Buffalo, New York	1937	Nonsectarian	2,600	Mavericks	2005	2022 (Note: Medaille would later compete as an associate member for men's volleyball, men's and women's swimming & diving and women's bowling until the end of the 2022–23 school year; when the school ceased operations.)	Closed in 2023
Wells College	Aurora, New York	1868	Nonsectarian	357	Express	2023 (Note: Wells was an associate member for men's and women's swimming & diving since 2020–21 and in men's volleyball since 2022–23; before joining as a full member in the 2023–24 school year.)	2024	Closed in 2024

=== Former associate members ===
The AMCC had 14 former associate members, all but one are private schools.

Institution	Location	Founded	Affiliation	Enrollment	Nickname	Joined (Note: Represents the calendar year when fall sports competition begins.)	Left (Note: Represents the calendar year when spring sports competition ends.)	AMCC sport(s)	Primary conference
Alfred University (Note: The AMCC and the Empire 8 Athletic Conference had a partnership for men's and women's swimming & diving.)	Alfred, New York	1836	Nonsectarian	2,007	Saxons	2019	2024	Men's swimming & diving	Empire 8 (E8)
Alfred University	Alfred, New York	1836	Nonsectarian	2,007	Saxons	2019	2024	Women's swimming & diving	Empire 8 (E8)
Cabrini University	Radnor Township, Pennsylvania	1957	Catholic (Missionary; Sisters)	1,759	Cavaliers	2010	2018	Men's swimming & diving	Closed in 2024 (Note: During their tenure as an associate member of the AMCC, Cabrini's primary home conference was the Colonial States Athletic Conference (CSAC) from 2010–11 to 2017–18.)
Cabrini University	Radnor Township, Pennsylvania	1957	Catholic (Missionary; Sisters)	1,759	Cavaliers	2010	2018	Women's swimming & diving	Closed in 2024
Geneva College	Beaver Falls, Pennsylvania	1848	RPCNA	1,366	Golden; Tornadoes	2018	2024	Men's volleyball	Presidents' (PAC)
Hartwick College	Oneonta, New York	1797	Nonsectarian	1,097	Hawks	2019	2024	Men's swimming & diving	Empire 8 (E8)
Hartwick College	Oneonta, New York	1797	Nonsectarian	1,097	Hawks	2019	2024	Women's swimming & diving	Empire 8 (E8)
Hiram College	Hiram, Ohio	1850	Disciples of Christ	1,061	Terriers	2017	2024	Men's volleyball	Presidents' (PAC)
Houghton University	Houghton, New York	1883	Wesleyan	1,200	Highlanders	2024	2026	Empire 8 (E8)	Men's volleyball
Medaille College (Note: Medaille competed as a full member of the AMCC from 2005–06 to 2021–22.) (Note: Later known as Medaille University since 2022.)	Buffalo, New York	1937	Nonsectarian	2,600	Mavericks	2022	2023	Men's volleyball	Closed in 2023
Medaille College	Buffalo, New York	1937	Nonsectarian	2,600	Mavericks	2022	2023	Women's bowling	Closed in 2023
Medaille College	Buffalo, New York	1937	Nonsectarian	2,600	Mavericks	2022	2023	Men's swimming & diving (Note: Medaille competed as an associate member of the AMCC for swimming & diving during the 2022–23 school year; due to the AMCC having a joint partnership with the Empire 8 Athletic Conference (which was Medaille's new primary conference home at that time).)	Closed in 2023
Medaille College	Buffalo, New York	1937	Nonsectarian	2,600	Mavericks	2022	2023	Women's swimming & diving	Closed in 2023
Nazareth University	Pittsford, New York	1924	Nonsectarian	2,401	Golden Flyers	2019	2024	Men's swimming & diving	Empire 8 (E8)
Nazareth University	Pittsford, New York	1924	Nonsectarian	2,401	Golden Flyers	2019	2024	Women's swimming & diving	Empire 8 (E8)
New Jersey City University	Jersey City, New Jersey	1929	Public	5,429	Gothic Knights	2015	2024	Women's bowling	New Jersey (NJAC)
Saint Vincent College (Note: Saint Vincent remains in the AMCC as an associate member for women's bowling.)	Latrobe, Pennsylvania	1846	Catholic (O.S.B.)	1,440	Bearcats	2020	2024	Men's volleyball	Presidents' (PAC)
State University of New York at Delhi (SUNY Delhi)	Delhi, New York	1913	Public	3,056	Broncos	2018	2020	Men's swimming & diving	North Atlantic (NAC) (Note: During their tenure as an associate member of the AMCC, SUNY Delhi's primary home conference was the American Collegiate Athletic Association (ACAA) during the 2018–19 school year.)
State University of New York at Delhi (SUNY Delhi)	Delhi, New York	1913	Public	3,056	Broncos	2018	2020	Women's swimming & diving	North Atlantic (NAC)
Thiel College	Greenville, Pennsylvania	1866	Lutheran ELCA	950	Tomcats	2016	2018	Women's bowling	Presidents' (PAC)
Thiel College	Greenville, Pennsylvania	1866	Lutheran ELCA	950	Tomcats	2018	2024	Men's volleyball	Presidents' (PAC)
Utica University	Utica, New York	1946	Nonsectarian	3,627	Pioneers	2019	2023	Men's swimming & diving	Empire 8 (E8) (Note: Utica dropped both men's and women's swimming & diving at the end of the 2022–23 school year.)
Utica University	Utica, New York	1946	Nonsectarian	3,627	Pioneers	2019	2023	Women's swimming & diving	Empire 8 (E8)
Wells College	Aurora, New York	1868	Nonsectarian	357	Express	2020	2023	Men's swimming & diving	Closed in 2024
Wells College	Aurora, New York	1868	Nonsectarian	357	Express	2020	2023	Women's swimming & diving	Closed in 2024
Wells College	Aurora, New York	1868	Nonsectarian	357	Express	2022	2023	Men's volleyball	Closed in 2024
Wittenberg University	Springfield, Ohio	1845	Lutheran ELCA	1,285	Tigers	2018	2020	Men's volleyball	North Coast (NCAC) (Note: The Wittenberg men's volleyball team currently competes in the Midwest Collegiate Volleyball League (MCVL).)

=== Membership timeline ===
Full member (all sports) Full member (non-football) Associate member (football) Associate member (sport)

== Sports ==
The AMCC Conference sponsors championships in the following sports:

Conference sports
Sport	Men's	Women's
Baseball	✓	
Basketball	✓	✓
Bowling		✓
Cross country	✓	✓
Golf	✓	
Lacrosse	✓	✓
Soccer	✓	✓
Softball		✓
Tennis	✓	✓
Volleyball	✓	✓
Wrestling	✓	✓

=== Men's sponsored sports by school ===
Departing members in pink.

School	Baseball	Basketball	Cross country	Golf	Soccer	Tennis	Volleyball	Wrestling	Total
Carlow	✗	✓	✓	✓	✓	✗	✓	✗	5
Hilbert	✓	✓	✓	✓	✓	✗	✓	✗	7
La Roche	✓	✓	✓	✓	✓	✗	✗	✗	6
Mount Aloysius	✓	✓	✓	✓	✓	✓	✓	✗	7
PS-Altoona	✓	✓	✗	✓	✓	✓	✓	✗	6
PS-Behrend	✓	✓	✓	✓	✓	✓	✗	✓	7
Pitt-Bradford	✓	✓	✗	✓	✓	✓	✗	✓	7
Pitt-Greensburg	✓	✓	✓	✓	✓	✓	✗	✗	6
Totals	7	8	6	8	8	5	4+2	2+1	47+3
Associate members
Buffalo State							✓		1
Hobart							✓		1
Penn College								✓	1

==== Men's varsity sports not sponsored by the AMCC that are played by AMCC schools ====
School	Football	Lacrosse	Swimming & diving	Track & field (indoor)	Track & field (outdoor)	Water polo (Note: De facto Division I sport. The NCAA operates a single championship open to members of all divisions.)
Carlow	✗	✗	✗	United East	United East	✗
Hilbert	Liberty	HCLC	✗	SUNYAC	SUNYAC	✗
La Roche	✗	HCLC	✗	✗	✗	✗
PS-Altoona	✗	✗	SUNYAC	✗	✗	✗
PS-Behrend	✗	✗	SUNYAC	SUNYAC	SUNYAC	MPSF
Pitt-Bradford	✗	United East	SUNYAC	✗	✗	✗

=== Women's sponsored sports by school ===
School	Basketball	Bowling (Note: De facto Division I sport through at least 2026–27, with the NCAA operating a single championship open to all divisions. In 2027–28, a separate Division II national championship will be established. The future alignment of Division III within the bowling championship structure has yet to be determined.)	Cross Country	Lacrosse	Soccer	Softball	Tennis	Volleyball	Wrestling (Note: De facto Division I sport through 2026–27, with the NCAA operating a single championship open to all divisions. In 2027–28, a separate Division III national championship will be established.)	Total
Carlow	✓	✗	✓	✗	✓	✓	✓	✓	✗	6
Hilbert	✓	✓	✓	✓	✓	✓	✗	✓	✗	7
La Roche	✓	✓	✓	✓	✓	✓	✓	✓	✗	8
Mount Aloysius	✓	✓	✓	✓	✓	✓	✓	✓	✗	8
PS-Altoona	✓	✓	✗	✗	✓	✓	✓	✓	✓	6
PS-Behrend	✓	✓	✓	✗	✓	✓	✓	✓	✗	7
Pitt-Bradford	✓	✓	✗	✓	✓	✓	✓	✓	✗	7
Pitt-Greensburg	✓	✓	✓	✗	✓	✓	✓	✓	✗	7
Totals	8	7+2	6	4	8	8	7	8	1+4	58+6
Associate Members
Buffalo State									✓	1
Elmira									✓	1
Hiram									✓	1
John Carroll									✓	1
New Jersey City		✓								1
Saint Vincent		✓								1

==== Women's varsity sports not sponsored by the AMCC that are played by AMCC schools ====
School	Golf	Field Hockey	Ice Hockey	Swimming & Diving	Track & Field (Indoor)	Track & Field (Outdoor)	Water Polo (Note: De facto Division I sport, with the NCAA operating a single championship open to all divisions.)
Carlow	CWGC	✗	✗	✗	United East	United East	✗
Hilbert	✗	✗	UCHC	✗	SUNYAC	SUNYAC	✗
Mount Aloysius	Independent	✗	✗	✗	✗	✗	✗
PS-Altoona	CWGC	✗	✗	SUNYAC	✗	✗	✗
PS-Behrend	Independent	✗	✗	SUNYAC	SUNYAC	SUNYAC	CWPA
Pitt-Bradford	✗	✗	✗	SUNYAC	✗	✗	✗
