= Alumni Arena (SUNY Cortland) =

Coordinates: 42°35′24.43″N 76°11′52.65″W

- Interactive map of Alumni Arena
- Location: Cortland, New York, United States
- Owner: SUNY Cortland
- Operator: SUNY Cortland
- Capacity: 2,500 (hockey)
- Surface: 185' × 85'(hockey)

Tenant
- SUNY Cortland Red Dragons

The Campus Center Hockey Arena is a 2,500-seat multi-purpose ice arena located in Cortland, New York on the campus of SUNY Cortland. The arena is also the home to the Cortland Red Dragons men's and women's ice hockey teams competing at the NCAA Division III level in the State University of New York Athletic Conference (SUNYAC). As well as a men's club team competing at the ACHA Division I level in the Northeast Collegiate Hockey League, SUNY Cortland Figure Skating Club, intramural hockey, and broomball. And for recreation ice skating and figure skating.

The arena is also used for various other events: commencement ceremonies, trade shows, conventions, concerts, Empire State Games, volleyball, and sports camps.

The ice arena is part of the larger Park Center Athletic Complex that serves as a location for various student activities and Red Dragon Athletic facilities.
