= Northeast Women's Hockey League =

Women's ice hockey conference

- Association: NCAA
- Founded: 2017
- Folded: 2023 (absorbed by State University of New York Athletic Conference)
- Sports fielded: Ice hockey; women's: 1
- Division: Division III
- No. of teams: 7
- Headquarters: Syracuse, New York
- Region: New York
- Website: NEWHL homepage

Locations
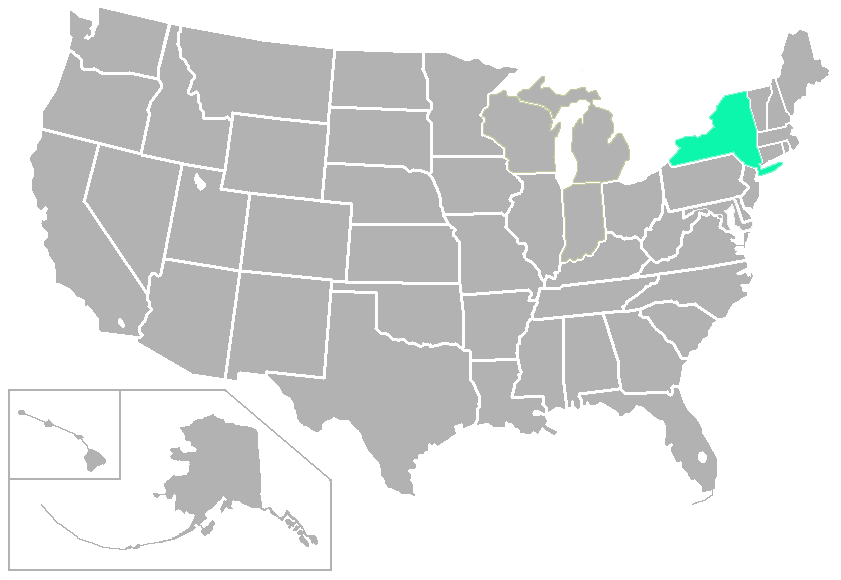

The Northeast Women's Hockey League was an NCAA Division III women's ice hockey conference. The conference was formed in 2017 when the ECAC West collapsed and the women's ice hockey programs of the five schools whose primary conference was the State University of New York Athletic Conference (SUNYAC) banded together to form the NEWHL. While SUNYAC supports men's ice hockey, only five of the ten member schools sponsor women's ice hockey. The conference announced that it would cease operations and would be absorbed by SUNYAC starting in 2023-24 season.

== Members ==
The NEWHL was formed by five schools in 2017 and was joined by two more beginning with the 2019–20 season. Because seven teams is the minimum requirement for a conference to receive an automatic bid for the NCAA Championship Tournament, the stability of the NEWHL was greatly strengthened with the additions.

=== Final members ===
Institution	Location	Nickname	Founded	Type	Enrollment	Colors	Joined
Buffalo State College	Buffalo, New York	Bengals	1871	Public	11,224		2017
Morrisville State College	Morrisville, New York	Mustangs	1908	Public	3,200		2019
State University of New York at Canton	Canton, New York	Roos	1906	Public	3,550		2019
State University of New York at Cortland	Cortland, New York	Red Dragons	1868	Public	7,234		2017
State University of New York at Oswego	Oswego, New York	Lakers	1861	Public	8,909		2017
State University of New York at Plattsburgh	Plattsburgh, New York	Cardinals	1889	Public	6,358		2017
State University of New York at Potsdam	Potsdam, New York	Bears	1816	Public	4,325		2017
