= Binghamton Bearcats men's ice hockey =

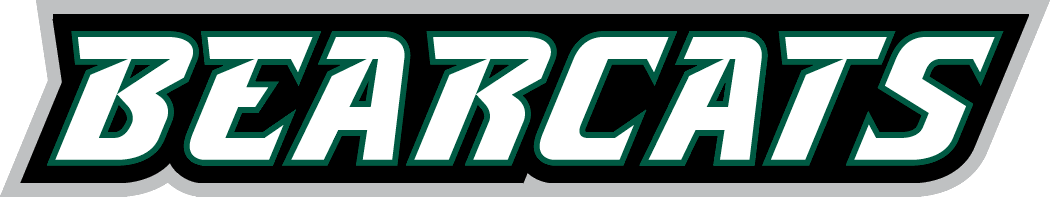
- University: Binghamton University
- First season: 1987-88
- Arena: Vestal, New York
- Colors: Dark green, white, and black

The Binghamton Bearcats men's ice hockey team was an athletic program that represented Binghamton University in NCAA Division II ice hockey from 1987 to 1992. In recent years, the university has discussed adding Division I ice hockey, though talks are currently tabled.

== History ==
In 1987, Binghamton fielded its first varsity ice hockey team. The club was a member of the ECAC West, a Division III conference that was home to several other New York schools. After decent results in their first season, an NCAA-required transition year, the club fell on hard times, going winless over the following two seasons. The team was finally able to win again during their fourth season but the Colonials remained near the bottom of the conference standings. After 5 years and little to show for their efforts, the program was shuttered for financial reasons.

In April 2023, Binghamton AD Gene Marshall announced that the school was planning to add both Division I men's ice hockey and women's field hockey for the 2024-25 athletic season. On July 25, 2024, Marshall announced that due to the changing NCAA landscape pertaining to NIL, talks of adding a hockey team had been tabled.

== Season-by-season results ==
Note: GP = Games played, W = Wins, L = Losses, T = Ties

NCAA D-I Champions	NCAA Frozen Four	Conference Regular Season Champions	Conference Playoff Champions

Season	Conference	Regular Season (Note: Code explanation; GP—Games Played, W—Wins, L—Losses, T—Tied games, Pts—Points*)											Conference Tournament Results	National Tournament Results
Season	Conference	Conference						Overall					Conference Tournament Results	National Tournament Results
Season	Conference	GP	W	L	T	Pts*	Finish	GP	W	L	T	%	Conference Tournament Results	National Tournament Results
Division III
John Stella (1987 — 1990)
1987–88	ECAC West	9	2	7	0	.222	14th	16	4	12	0	.250		
1988–89	ECAC West	22	0	22	0	.000	16th	25	0	25	0	.000		
1989–90	ECAC West	23	0	23	0	.000	16th	25	0	25	0	.000		
Pat Dwyer (1990 — 1992)
1990–91	ECAC West	21	3	18	0	.143	15th	23	4	19	0	.174		
1991–92	ECAC West	22	2	20	0	.091	15th	23	3	20	0	.130		
Totals								GP	W	L	T	%	Championships	
Regular Season								112	11	101	0	.098		
Conference Post-season								0	0	0	0	–		
NCAA Post-season								0	0	0	0	–		
Regular Season and Post-season Record								112	11	101	0	.098		

* Winning percentage is used when conference schedules are unbalanced.
