= University of Pittsburgh at Titusville =

Coordinates: 41°37′45″N 79°40′02″W

- Motto: Veritas et Virtus (Latin)
- Motto in English: Truth and Virtue
- Type: State-related
- Established: 1963
- Endowment: $1.14 million
- President: Richard Esch
- Academic staff: 30
- Students: 135
- Location: Titusville, Pennsylvania, United States
- Campus: Rural, 10 acres (0.040 km^{2})
- Colors: Pitt Royal and Pitt Gold
- Website: www.titusville.pitt.edu

The University of Pittsburgh at Titusville (Pitt-Titusville or UPT) is a state-related college in Titusville, Pennsylvania. It is a regional campus of the University of Pittsburgh with its administrative leadership shared with the University of Pittsburgh at Bradford. UPT offers an associate degree in nursing and is home to the Educational Training Center (ETC).

For most of its history, UPT served as a two year institution providing associate degrees and pre-professional tracks, but was restructured in the fall of 2020 to house the ETC while maintaining its associates degree nursing program. This ETC currently incorporates programs from multiple institutions: the University of Pittsburgh Swanson School of Engineering's Manufacturing Assistance Center, various programs of the Northern Pennsylvania Regional College (NPRC), and the Brockway Center for Arts & Technology clinical medical assistant and phlebotomy program.

== History ==
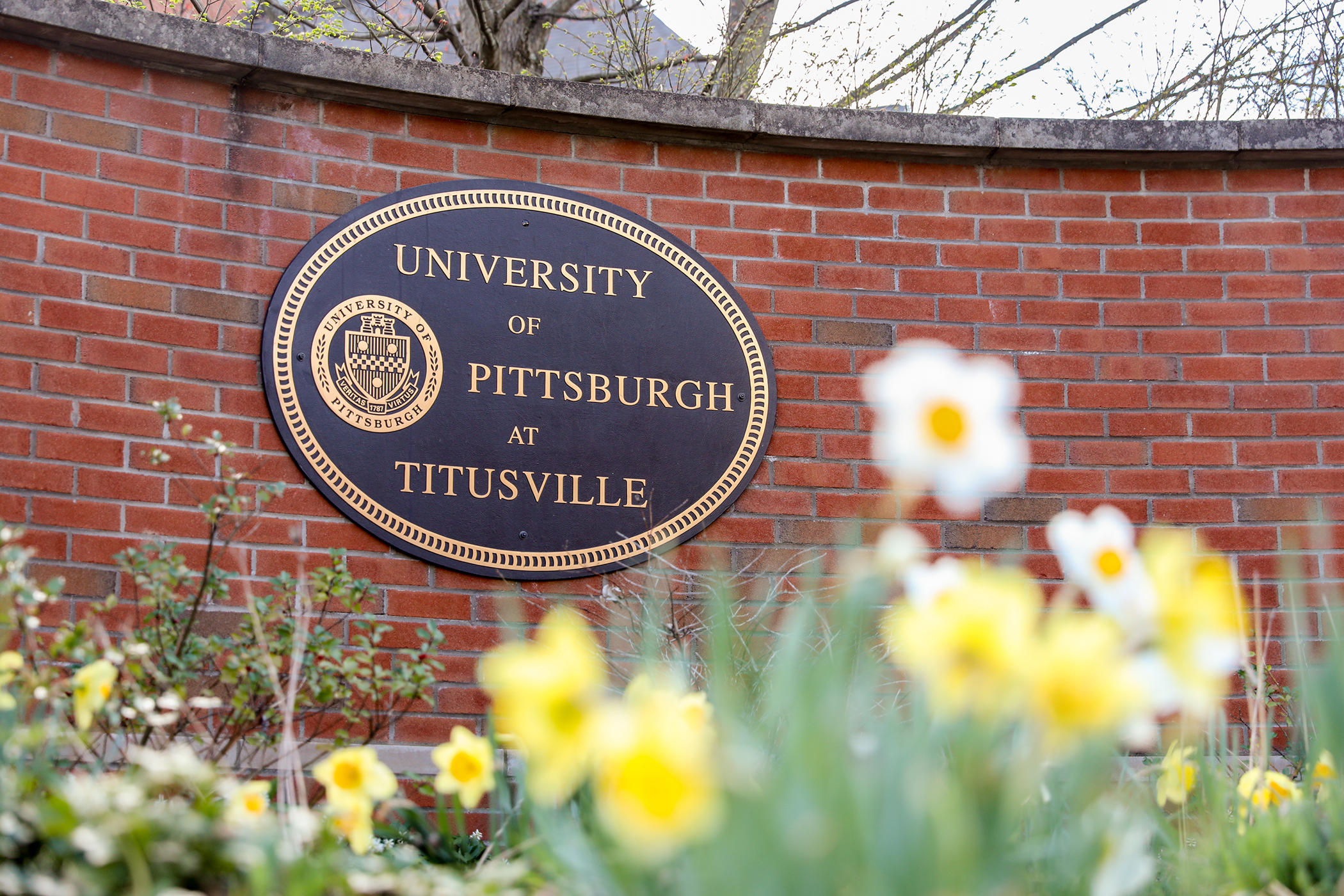
Pitt-Titusville campus entrance sign

The University of Pittsburgh at Titusville was established in 1963 in response to a long-recognized need for higher educational opportunities in the Oil Creek Region. Following a successful fundraising campaign, UPT opened its doors in the fall of 1963 with classes being held in McKinney Hall. Joe M. Ball, a University of Pittsburgh administrator, was named the first president and served in that capacity until his retirement in 1983.

The first entering class numbered some 75 students. McKinney and the adjacent Carriage House were remodeled for classroom, office, and library space. By the end of the 1960s, the campus school had its own residence halls while the 1970s saw the library move into a dedicated facility, Haskell Memorial Library.

The 1980s saw the installation of the school's second president, Michael Worman, and construction of the 164-bed Spruce Hall dormitory. The 1990s saw the opening of the Barco Center, the initiation of the physical therapist assistant degree program, the first graduation ceremony, and the dedication of the Broadhourst Science Center. In the 2000s, the Titusville campus offered its first four-year degree program in conjunction with the University of Pittsburgh at Bradford, dedicated the Barco-Duratz Plaza, initiated a two-year nursing program, and installed its third president, William A. Shields.

On May 7, 2012, the University of Pittsburgh announced that the administrative functions at Pitt-Titusville would be centralized at the University of Pittsburgh at Bradford and that the Titusville campus would report to the Pitt-Bradford President Livingston Alexander, who would effectively become president of Pitt-Titusville. On July 1, 2022, Richard Esch, Pitt-Bradford's Vice President for Business Affairs, assumed the role of president for both campuses.

== Location ==
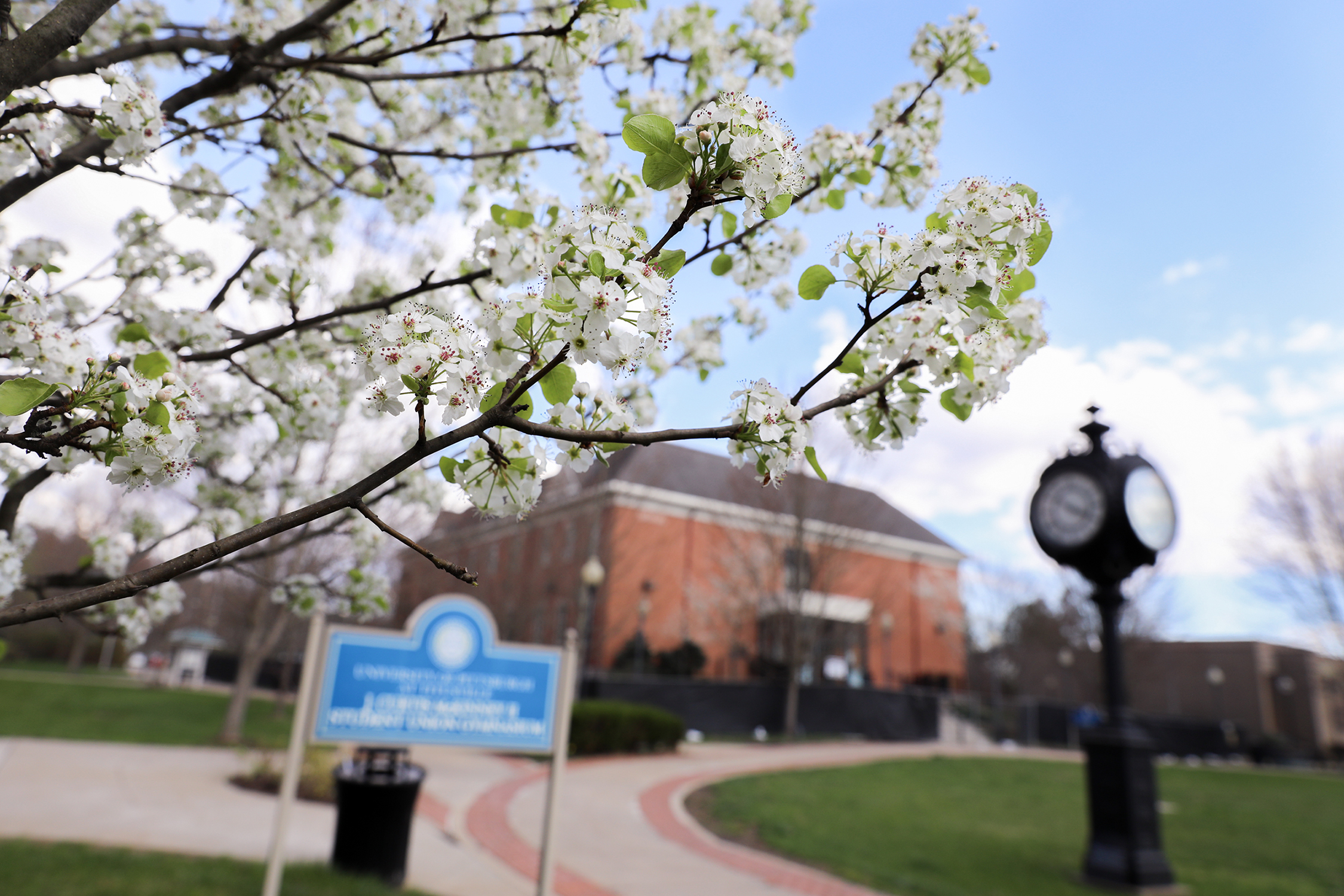
Broadhurst Science Center

UPT is located in the city of Titusville, Crawford County, Pennsylvania, a city of approximately 6,000 residents. The campus is two hours north of Pittsburgh, two hours south of Buffalo, and two hours east of Cleveland.

== Campus ==
The Titusville Campus, located on and adjacent to the former McKinney Estate, offers modern comfort and convenience in a traditional residential setting. McKinney Hall, built in 1870 by John C. Bryan, houses administrative, faculty offices, and classrooms. In 1926, The McKinneys purchased the building and spent nearly a million dollars in renovations on the home and landscaping. Mrs. Charlotte McKinney Haskell later donated the twenty-five room mansion to the University of Pittsburgh at Titusville.

The Bennett Davis Building, formerly the carriage house of the estate, now houses the offices of student accounts, registrar, financial aid, human resources, and business affairs.

The recently restored gazebo, now known as the Serenity House, serves as a quiet gathering place for students and as a location for special events.

Haskell Memorial Library, completed in 1975, is also located on land originally part of the McKinney Estate. It houses the campus collection of books (nearly 44,000) and periodicals, a 150-seat auditorium, the Pitt-Titusville Learning Center, classrooms, faculty offices, and the computer center with access to the latest hardware and software. The center is also linked to 27 other Pitt libraries through an online computer catalog called PITTCAT Plus.

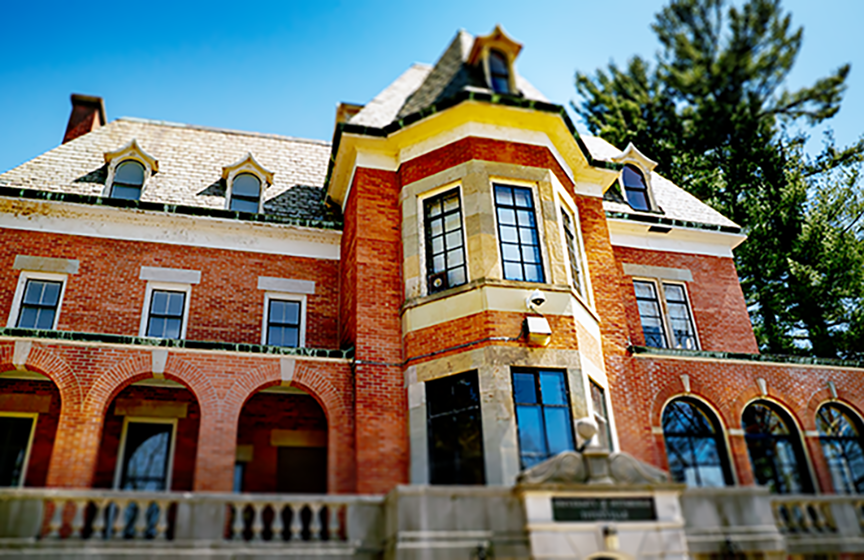
McKinney House

The newer $5 million Broadhurst Science Center opened in 1998. The 32,000-square-foot (3,000 m^{2}) structure houses biology, chemistry, nursing, and computer laboratories, faculty offices, plus two demonstration/lecture halls and one general classroom, all with multi-media video and smart technology systems. The building also features a 417-seat theatre/auditorium, home to events that enrich the life of the campus and surrounding communities.

Adjacent to the above group of buildings is the J. Curtis McKinney II Student Union/Gymnasium, completed in 1982. The east wing of the building offers a full-sized gymnasium, an auxiliary gym, and racquetball courts. The west wing of the building houses a snack bar, a large multi-purpose room, the Student Affairs Office and the UPT Health Center, as well as several classrooms and administrative offices. In 2013, a $4.6 million, 8,100-square-foot (750 m^{2}) addition to the McKinney Student Union was opened that houses a new dining facility that includes a Wood Stone Oven and a cutting edge service area with cook-to-order stations offering a variety of food choices. The new dining hall has received several awards from the local community.

Behind the student union/gymnasium is UPT's residence facility, Spruce Street Residence Hall, completed in 1988.

== Academics ==
Pitt-Titusville offers an Associate of Science in Nursing degree and various certificate and training programs through the University of Pittsburgh at Titusville Education and Training Hub, in collaboration with the Northern Pennsylvania Regional College (NPRC), https://regionalcollegepa.org/https://regionalcollegepa.org/ the University of Pittsburgh Swanson School of Engineering - Manufacturing Assistance Center (MAC), and Manchester Bidwell Corporation.

== Athletics ==
The Pittsburgh–Titusville (UPT) athletic teams were known as the Panthers. The campus was a member of the National Junior College Athletic Association (NJCAA), primarily competing in the Western Pennsylvania Athletic Association (WPAA) within the Pennsylvania Collegiate Athletic Association (PCAA) until after the 2019–20 academic year. The Panthers were also members of the United States Collegiate Athletic Association (USCAA).

UPT competed in three intercollegiate athletic teams: Men's sports included basketball; while women's sports included basketball and volleyball.

=== Accomplishments ===
The women's basketball team was particularly successful. In its first two years of existence, the 2004–05 and 2005–06 seasons, they won their conference and went on to claim the state championship by winning the PCAA Championship. The women also ranked 23rd in the nation in the USCAA during the 2009–10 season. After the campus restructured into the Education and Training Hub, the athletic programs were phased out. The final Pitt-Titusville athletic events were held in 2020.
