= Commonwealth System of Higher Education =

Statutory designation by the Commonwealth of Pennsylvania

The Commonwealth System of Higher Education is a statutory designation by the Commonwealth of Pennsylvania that confers "state-related" status on four universities in Pennsylvania: Lincoln University, the Pennsylvania State University, Temple University, and the University of Pittsburgh. The designation establishes the schools as an "instrumentality of the commonwealth" and provides each university with annual, non-preferred financial appropriations in exchange offering tuition discounts to students who are residents of Pennsylvania and a minority state-representation on each school's board of trustees. As an affiliate of the Pennsylvania State University, Pennsylvania College of Technology is included in the system.

The universities remain legally separate and private entities, operating under their own charters, governed by independent boards of trustees, and with assets under their own ownership and control, thereby retaining much of the freedom and individuality of private institutions, both administratively and academically. Other schools, such as Cornell University, the University of Delaware, and Rutgers University also have public–private partnerships of their own kind.

Because their annual state allocations account for less than 10% of their budgets, universities in the Commonwealth System tend to have higher tuition costs compared to those in the Pennsylvania State System of Higher Education, which contains 10 state-owned and operated universities. Because of their independence, universities in the Commonwealth System are exempted from Pennsylvania's Right-to-Know Law except for a few minor provisions.

== History ==
Before the legal creation of state-related universities and colleges in the 1960s, Lincoln University, Temple University, and the University of Pittsburgh were fully private universities. Temple and Pitt were granted state-related status by acts of the Pennsylvania General Assembly in 1965 and 1966, respectively. Lincoln University, a historically Black university, was designated as a state-related university in 1972.

Although the Pennsylvania State University, commonly known as Penn State, was founded as a private school, it was later designated as Pennsylvania's sole land-grant institution. It was repeatedly defined as a "state-owned university" in numerous official acts and Pennsylvania Attorney General opinions from its creation as a land-grant, then named the Pennsylvania State College. It was thus eligible to have its road system and buildings on state campuses constructed using state funding, paying its employees through state-issued checks, and having them eligible to collect state employee retirement system benefits.

Penn State was already treated and referred to as a public state-related university by the Commonwealth, including receiving non-preferred appropriations, when the other three universities were designated as state-related institutions by the legislature. In 1984, Penn State asserted a public status in court for the purpose of not having a private bank branch's operations on its University Park campus subject to local county taxes, while simultaneously asserting private status for the purpose of not having to reveal the salaries of its top administrative employees. With the enabling legislation changing the failing Williamsport (PA) Area Community College to the affiliated "Pennsylvania College of Technology" in 1989, Penn State was reaffirmed as a "state-related" institution.

== Universities ==
The following universities (listed with their branch and regional campuses) are members of the Commonwealth System of Higher Education:

=== Lincoln ===
- Lincoln University, Lower Oxford Township

=== Penn State ===
- Pennsylvania State University, University Park

Penn State Abington (4-year undergraduate)
Penn State Altoona (4-year undergraduate)
Penn State Beaver (4-year undergraduate)
Penn State Berks (4-year undergraduate)
Penn State Brandywine (4-year undergraduate)
Penn State DuBois (4-year undergraduate)
Penn State Dickinson, Carlisle (Graduate law)
Penn State Behrend (4-year undergraduate)

Penn State Fayette (4-year undergraduate)
Penn State Great Valley (Graduate)
Penn State Greater Allegheny (4-year undergraduate)
Penn State Harrisburg (4-year undergraduate and graduate)
Penn State Hazleton (4-year undergraduate)
Penn State Hershey (Graduate medical)
Penn State Lehigh Valley (4-year undergraduate)
Penn State Mont Alto (4-year undergraduate)

Penn State New Kensington (4-year undergraduate)
Penn State Schuylkill (4-year undergraduate)
Penn State Scranton (4-year undergraduate)
Penn State Shenango (4-year undergraduate)
Penn State Wilkes-Barre (4-year undergraduate)
Penn State York (4-year undergraduate)
Pennsylvania College of Technology (Applied technical training)

=== Pittsburgh ===
- University of Pittsburgh, Pittsburgh

University of Pittsburgh at Bradford (4-year undergraduate and graduate)
University of Pittsburgh at Greensburg (4-year undergraduate)
University of Pittsburgh at Johnstown (4-year undergraduate and graduate)
University of Pittsburgh at Titusville (2-year undergraduate)

=== Temple ===
- Temple University, Philadelphia

Temple University Ambler (4-year undergraduate and graduate)
Temple University Fort Washington (Graduate)
Temple University Harrisburg (1-year undergraduate and graduate)
Temple University, Japan Campus (4-year undergraduate and graduate)

== Rankings of universities ==
School	U.S. News & World Report, Best Universities 2021	U.S. News & World Report, Best Business Schools 2020	U.S. News & World Report, Best Education Schools 2020	U.S. News & World Report, Best Engineering Schools 2020	U.S. News & World Report, Best Fine Arts Schools 2017	U.S. News & World Report, Best Law Schools 2020	U.S. News & World Report, Best Library & Information Studies Schools, 2018	U.S. News & World Report, Best Medical Schools, Research & Primary Care 2020	U.S. News & World Report, Best Nursing Schools, Masters & Doctoral 2020	U.S. News & World Report, Best Public Affairs Schools 2020	CMUP, Top Public American Research Universities 2017	The Wall Street Journal/THE US College Rankings 2019	Academic Ranking of World Universities 2019	QS World University Rankings 2020
Lincoln University	119th, Regional Universities (North)	N/A	N/A	N/A	N/A	N/A	N/A	N/A	N/A	N/A	N/A	N/A	N/A	N/A
Pennsylvania State University	63rd, National Universities (University Park)	33rd (Smeal)	39th	35th	69th	64th (University Park); 71st (Dickinson)	N/A	"unranked"	26th & "unranked"	82nd (Harrisburg)	16th–17th	104th	98th	93rd
Temple University	102nd, National Universities	N/A	45th	124th	15th (Tyler)	48th (Beasley)	N/A	60th & 85th (Katz)	N/A & 72nd	N/A	N/A	168th	301st–400th	651st–700th
University of Pittsburgh	58th, National Universities (Pittsburgh Campus)	43rd (Katz)	33rd	47th (Swanson)	N/A	77th	10th	13th & 14th	12th & 9th	35th	13th–15th	80th	89th	140th

=== Endowment and research ===
Endowments (FY 2025*)

- Pittsburgh – $6.15 billion
- Penn State – $5.06 billion
- Temple – $1.05 billion
- Lincoln – $0.06 billion*
- Pittsburgh at Bradford – $0.04 billion

*Lincoln University's numbers are as of June 30, 2024. Totals include endowment for all campuses and schools in a system unless otherwise listed.

Research and Development Expenditures (FY 2024)

- Pittsburgh (Pittsburgh campus) – $1,504.7 million
- Penn State (University Park & Hershey Medical Center) – $1,303.0 million
- Temple – $315.0 million
- Penn State Behrend – $7.1 million
- Penn State Harrisburg – $5.7 million
- Penn State Altoona – $1.6 million
- Penn State Berks – $1.2 million
- Penn State Abington – $0.7 million
- Penn State Great Valley – $0.7 million
- Lincoln – $0.7 million
- Penn State Wilkes-Barre – $0.3 million

== See also ==
- Statutory college, the private-public contractual system of higher education schools and colleges in New York State.
