= University of Pittsburgh at Bradford =

Public college in Bradford, Pennsylvania, US

Coordinates: 41°56′39″N 78°40′23″W

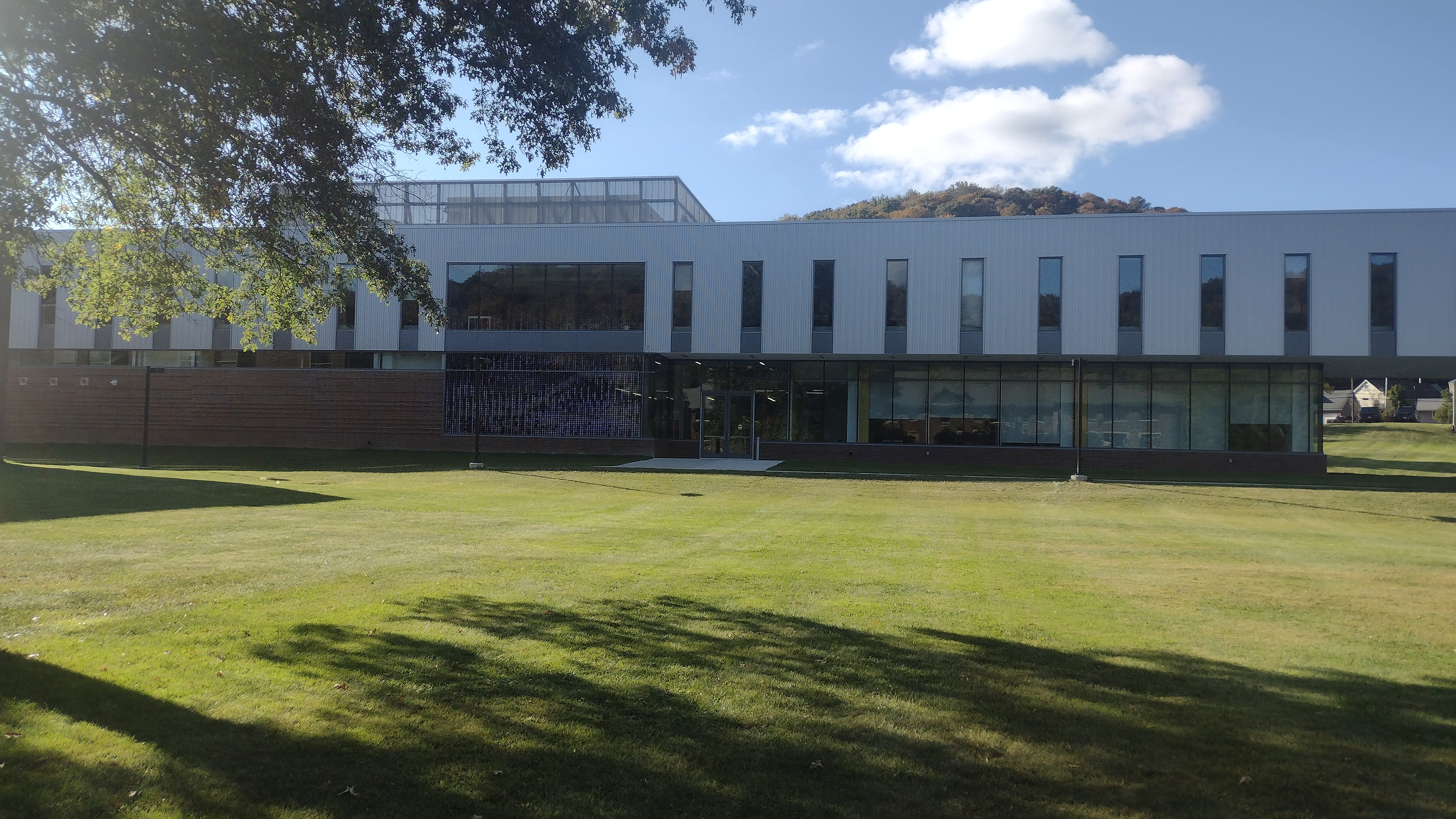
- George B. Duke Engineering and Information Technologies Building
- Motto: Veritas et Virtus (Latin)
- Motto in English: Truth and Virtue
- Type: State-related regional campus
- Established: 1963; 63 years ago
- Accreditation: MSCHE
- Endowment: $37.66 million (2025)
- Chancellor: Joan Gabel
- President: Richard Esch
- Faculty: 98
- Students: 1,317
- Location: Bradford address, Pennsylvania, United States
- Campus: Rural, 470 acres (1.9 km^{2})
- Colors: Pitt Royal and Pitt Gold
- Nickname: Panthers
- Sporting affiliations: NCAA Division III – AMCC
- Website: upb.pitt.edu

The University of Pittsburgh at Bradford (Pitt-Bradford or UPB) is a state-related college in Bradford Township, McKean County, Pennsylvania. Founded in 1963, it is a baccalaureate degree-granting, regional campus of the University of Pittsburgh, conferring degrees in over 40 fields of study. In addition to its focus on undergraduate education, the campus hosts multiple research/teaching units of the University of Pittsburgh, including the Center for Rural Health Practice and the Allegheny Institute of Natural History, as well as the Marilyn Horne Museum and Exhibit Center.

Pitt-Bradford is a residential college and most students reside in one of sixteen on-campus residence halls. UPB athletic programs are affiliated with NCAA Division III, competing as members of the Allegheny Mountain Collegiate Conference.

== History ==
=== Founding ===
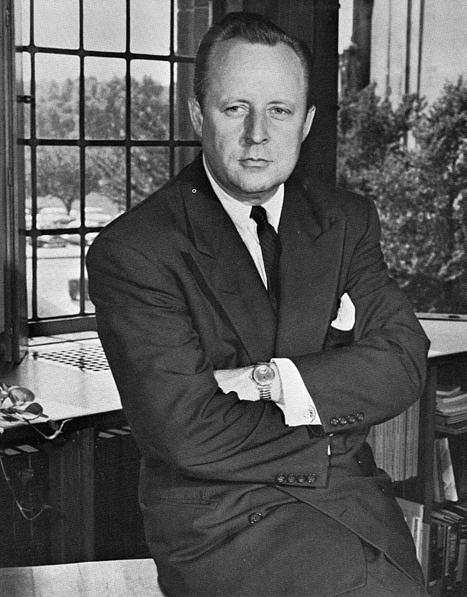
Edward Litchfield, 12th chancellor of the University of Pittsburgh, led the efforts to establish the Bradford campus

The University of Pittsburgh at Bradford was founded in 1963, in response to a shortage of higher education institutions in the North central / Northwestern region of Pennsylvania. While Pennsylvania State University had previously offered courses in Bradford in 1933 and 1948, these arrangements lasted only a year and, at the time of Pitt-Bradford’s establishment, there were no opportunities for tertiary learning in the surrounding six-county area. To address this void, local leaders reached out to University of Pittsburgh (Pitt) Chancellor Edward Litchfield, advocating for a permanent presence in the region. During the early correspondence, Litchfield was evaluating the feasibility of several sites in Western Pennsylvania with the goal of increasing the University’s footprint. Pitt had previous success establishing extension centers and junior colleges, particularly the Johnstown Junior College in Cambria County in 1927, a model which served as the inspiration for the Penn State commonwealth campuses, and which the Litchfield administration now planned to incorporate into Pitt’s expansion.

Among Pitt’s primary concerns were both the interest of local communities in maintaining and financially supporting a regional campus. Once the University leadership settled on Bradford and two other locations, Litchfield’s administration worked with officials in the Bradford area to acquire funding and facilities for the new venture (including classrooms, dormitories, and a library), as well as new faculty. To support the college’s establishment and growth, local philanthropists and businesses exceeded the University’s fundraising target by more than thirty percent. The first class arrived in Fall 1963 and consisted of 143 full-time and 145 part-time students.

A private university since its founding, the University of Pittsburgh became a state-related institution in 1966 upon joining the Commonwealth System of Higher Education. This affiliation provided access to public funding, which was used in part to help expand the campus and programs at Pitt-Bradford. While the college was originally located in Bradford’s downtown area, it moved in the 1970s to its current location just outside the city limits, putting down roots on land collectively donated by Witco-Kendall Corporation, the City of Bradford, and Bradford Township.

=== 1980 to present ===
Initially a two-year institution for students intending to transfer to the Pittsburgh campus, Pitt-Bradford received baccalaureate degree-granting status in 1979. Under the leadership of President Richard McDowell, the campus continued to experience growth throughout the 1980s and 1990s, expanding its academic programs, physical plant, and forging its identity as a four-year residential college. As part of this process, the campus continued revising its curriculum to include foundational liberal arts courses, ensuring that students received an eclectic education and exposure to various disciplines, in addition to their major coursework.

In 2004, the University of Pittsburgh at Bradford conferred its first honorary degree to opera star Marilyn Horne, in recognition of her support of the campus and local community. A 2012 study conducted by the University of Pittsburgh's Center for Social and Urban Research found that Pitt-Bradford was generating $67.5 million in annual economic activity for the region, creating or supporting 740 full-time jobs. In 2013, the college celebrated its 50th anniversary, now having over 10,000 alumni from all 50 states and several countries around the world. To mark the occasion, Pitt-Bradford unveiled a new panther statue on the Bromeley Quadrangle. On July 1, 2022, Richard Esch (then Pitt-Bradford Vice President for Business Affairs), assumed the role of President.

== Campus ==
The University of Pittsburgh at Bradford is located just outside the city limits of Bradford, Pennsylvania, in Bradford Township in rural McKean County, Pennsylvania, near the Allegheny National Forest. The 491-acre campus has 38 buildings (including 16 residence halls and an athletics complex) and is bordered by the Tungungwant Creek and the adjacent McDowell Trail. The structures combine a modern architectural style with rustic features, designed to complement the area’s natural surroundings.

=== Bromeley Quadrangle ===
The center of campus is the Bromeley Quadrangle, where Pitt-Bradford's primary administrative and academic buildings are located. Swarts Hall, Pitt-Bradford's first academic building, is home to several disciplines, including business, economics, history, education, nursing, political science, and sociology. The building also houses several multimedia classrooms, and the Office of Academic Affairs.

Fisher Hall contains the science and engineering faculty and is the location for classes in biology, chemistry, and physics. It is also home to the science labs and a computer-aided learning center (known as CALC labs). The campus greenhouse is atop the building. In 2010, Fisher Hall's chemistry and biology laboratories received nearly $6 million in upgrades.

The Frame-Westerberg Commons is the student center. Positioned in front of the commons is a 10.5 foot-long (3.2m) bronze panther statue created by Bradford native David Hodges. The panther stands on top of a rock originating from the same quarry that provided stone for the University of Pittsburgh's Pittsburgh campus’ Cathedral of Learning -- and was unveiled on September 3, 2013 in honor of the 50th anniversary of Pitt-Bradford's opening.

Hanley Library (the last building constructed on the quad) contains more than 95,000 books. The library also provides access to 400 electronic databases; 50,000 e-journals; 300,000 e-books; and other electronic resources. The Bradford campus has access to the full scholarly resources of the University of Pittsburgh from 20 libraries and more than 6 million books through the University Library System. Hanley Library is home to the Academic Success Center, the Academic Advising Center, the Writing Center, and TRIO Student Support Services, which provides academic assistance to students. The Hanley Library Cafe is located inside near the foyer.

With 6,148,036 total volumes, the University of Pittsburgh Library System is the 29th largest library and 21st largest university library in the United States. It is also the second largest library in Pennsylvania, behind only the Penn Libraries of the University of Pennsylvania.

=== Other buildings ===
Across the "loop" on Campus Drive, Blaisdell Hall is Pitt-Bradford's fine arts and communication arts building and home to the broadcast communications, interdisciplinary arts, theater and music programs. It features all-digital television and radio studios, the 500-seat Bromeley Family Theater, art studios, a music rehearsal hall, lighting and sound booths, and music theory and technology studios. The building is also home to the KOA Art Gallery, which hosts various exhibitions of traditional and new genre art.

The George B. Duke Engineering and Information Technologies Building opened in 2023. Featuring a rooftop solar array, it is anticipated to meet LEED Silver or better. The building is home to the KOA Engineering Technology Department, including programs in engineering, energy science and technology, mechanical engineering technology, and computer information systems.

The CSI House hosts practicum sessions for the criminal justice and forensic science programs. In this facility, students are instructed on how to process crime scenes and collect evidence using professional law enforcement equipment. Near the CSI House is the Ceramics Studio, which supports fine arts faculty and students.

The Richard E. and Ruth McDowell Sport and Fitness Center contains a performance arena, where the basketball and volleyball teams compete, as well as a fitness center, an NCAA-regulation natatorium, an athletic training room, and the McDowell Field House. It is also houses facilities for the exercise science and athletic training majors, including a physiology lab.

The Hangar Building, a former airplane hangar, contains the Office of Enrollment Services and Registrar, the Office of Financial Aid and the Office of Business Affairs. The Systems and Network Administration Practice (SNAP) lab for the CIS&T program also resides here. Wick Chapel, a $2.5 million, 150-seat, multipurpose, nondenominational chapel was dedicated on September 30, 2010.

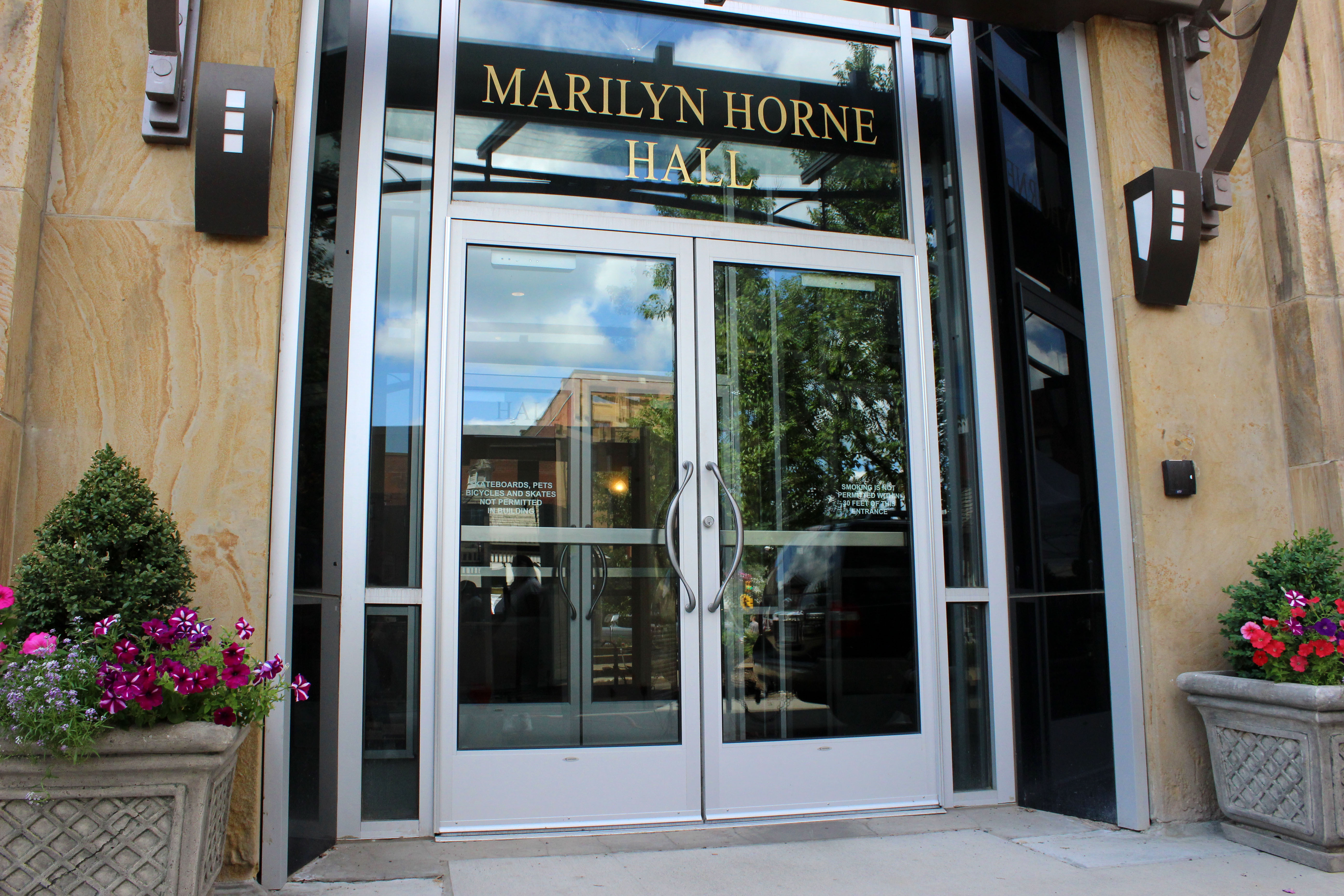
Pitt-Bradford's Marilyn Horne Hall, located off-campus in downtown Bradford, houses the university's Marilyn Horne Museum.

Marilyn Horne Hall, formerly the Seneca Building, is located in downtown Bradford and contains the Center for Rural Engagement. Its ground floor is also home to the Marilyn Horne Museum and Exhibit Center which displays rotating selection of artifacts from the Marilyn Horne archives housed at the University of Pittsburgh.

== Organization and administration ==
The University of Pittsburgh at Bradford is a regional campus of the University of Pittsburgh, which is one of four institutions composing the Commonwealth System of Higher Education. The campus' chief administrator is the President, who is assisted by an advisory board. The presidents of the regional campuses (along with the heads of the University's 17 other schools and colleges), are under the purview of the Provost and Senior Vice Chancellor at the Pittsburgh campus, who reports to the Chancellor.

The college has five academic divisions: Behavioral and Social Sciences, Biological and Health Sciences, Communication and the Arts, Management and Education, and Physical and Computational Sciences.

Pitt-Bradford houses the Center for Rural Engagement, the Allegheny Institute of Natural History, the American Refining Group / Harry R. Halloran Jr. Energy Institute, and the Marilyn Horne Museum and Exhibit Center. Since 2012, Pitt-Bradford has overseen the operations of the University of Pittsburgh at Titusville. A two-year regional campus, Pitt-Titusville offers associate degree programs and professional training through the University of Pittsburgh at Titusville Education and Training Hub.

The University of Pittsburgh (including Pitt-Bradford and its other regional campuses) is accredited by the Middle States Association of Colleges and Schools.

== Academics ==
The Pitt-Bradford campus offers 110 academic programs consisting of 44 majors, 47 minors, and 19 pre-professional programs. The largest degree programs by enrollment are business management, biology, nursing, psychology, mechanical engineering technology and exercise science. In addition to liberal arts and sciences such as English, history and political science, psychology, and chemistry, the university offers professional programs in accounting, broadcast communications, and hospitality management. Pitt-Bradford also confers interdisciplinary degrees in forensic science and environmental studies.

The student/faculty ratio is 12:1 and the average class size is 16, with 66% of courses having fewer than 20 students, 29% having fewer than 10 students, and 1% having 50 or more students. All courses are taught by faculty, rather than graduate assistants. Internship and research opportunities are also available to students through partnerships with area businesses and industries.

=== Rankings and recognition ===
U.S. News & World Report's 2021 edition of Best Regional Colleges-North ranked Pitt-Bradford tied for 19th overall. The campus also received the following specialty rankings:

Category	Ranking
Best Colleges for Veterans	10
Best Value Schools	14
Top Performers in Social Mobility	9
Top Public Schools	11

UPB was ranked 57th in the nation among baccalaureate colleges by Washington Monthly in 2020, 8th in the nation for satellite campuses by The Best Colleges in 2019, and is named to the list of "Best Colleges in the Northeastern Region" by The Princeton Review. In 2016, it was also named to The Princeton Review Guide to 361 Green Colleges, which recognizes environmentally responsible colleges.

In 2019, the University of Pittsburgh launched the Pitt Success Pell Match Program, which provides Pell Grant recipients across the university with matching funds to lower the cost of attendance. Previously, the University of Pittsburgh at Bradford, along with Georgia State University, the University of California, San Diego, and ten other public universities, was recognized by the administration of President Barack Obama for its high enrollment and graduation rates among students receiving Pell Grants.

=== International studies ===
The University Center for International Studies (UCIS), located at the Pittsburgh campus, facilitates more than 350 study abroad programs in over 75 countries, providing UPB students in all majors the opportunity to participate in global education experiences. Programs offered by UCIS include: Panther Programs, with Pitt faculty developing curricula and leading students on overseas excursions, two-way exchange programs with foreign universities, and third-party programs approved by Pitt. Both the university and the Bradford campus offer scholarship opportunities for study abroad.

Pitt-Bradford coordinates additional programs through the campus' study abroad office, and offers the university's only undergraduate major in international affairs, which integrates foreign language study with coursework in politics, economics, and management.

== Student life ==
Pitt-Bradford is a residential college, with most students (including 86% of freshmen) living on campus in one of the fourteen residence halls. Pitt-Bradford has over 60 student clubs and organizations, several fraternities and sororities, and numerous intramural sports leagues. Student media includes: The Source, the college newspaper; WDRQ Campus Radio, Pitt-Bradford's radio station; and Baily’s Beads, a literary magazine featuring work from the campus community.

The student union is the Frame-Westerberg Commons. The Commons houses the campus dining room, as well as the Panther Shop, which serves as the campus bookstore and also features an after-hours convenience store; the Commons Cafe, where students can get a meal while sitting by the fireplace; the mail center; a game room; meeting space for student organizations; a lounge area; and the Mukaiyama University Room, where various events are held.

=== Housing ===
Student residences are primarily apartment-style and townhouse-style. Each unit houses two to five students, and rooms are either single or double occupancy. There are three types of residence halls: Suites (Lester and Barbara Rice House, Reed-Coit House, Sarah B. Dorn House and Howard L. Fesenmyer House), townhouses (Emily Dickinson House, Ernest Hemingway House, Herman Melville House, T.S. Eliot House and Gertrude Stein House), and garden apartments (Willa Cather House, F. Scott Fitzgerald House, James Baldwin House and William Faulkner House). First-year students reside in Livingston Alexander House, a $17 million LEED-certified complex constructed in 2018 and featuring study lounges and fitness areas.

=== Athletics ===
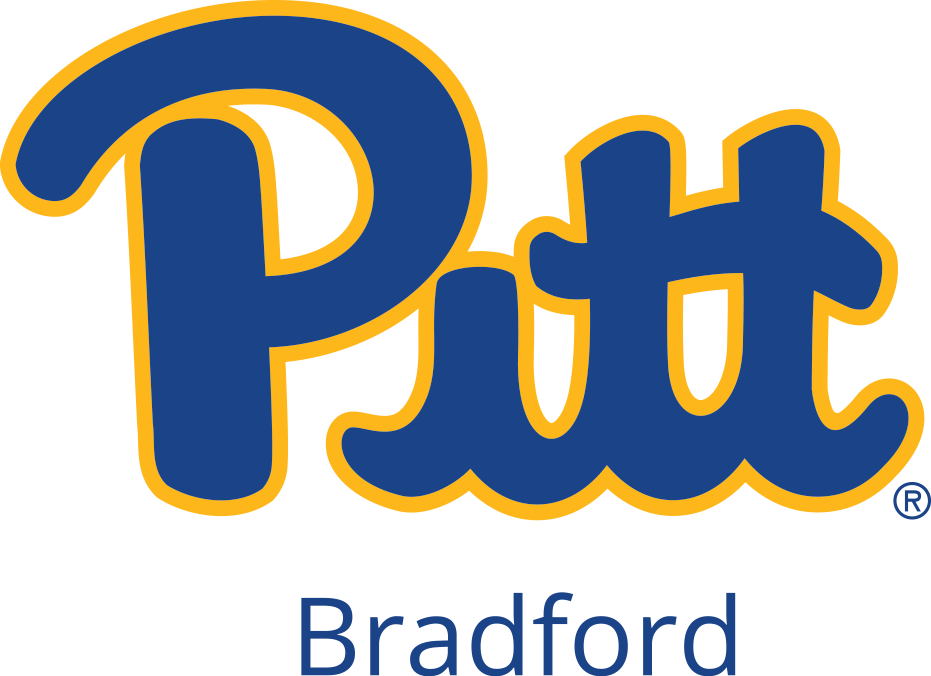
Pitt-Bradford athletics wordmark

The University of Pittsburgh at Bradford is an NCAA Division III institution and a charter member of the Allegheny Mountain Collegiate Conference (AMCC. Pitt-Bradford student athletes compete in 14 varsity sports: men's baseball, basketball, golf, lacrosse, soccer, swimming, and wrestling along with women's basketball, bowling, lacrosse, soccer, softball, swimming, and volleyball. UPB also has eSports and clay targets programs.

The KOA Arena is home to the basketball and volleyball programs, while the swimming team competes in the Paul C. Duke III Aquatic Center, which features a performance arena and an NCAA-regulation, six-lane swimming pool. The baseball, softball, Lacrosse and soccer teams play at the Kessel Athletic Complex, whose facilities include the baseball/softball field, lacrosse/soccer field and tennis and basketball courts.

Pitt-Bradford's athletic programs hold a combined 17 conference titles and have appeared in several NCAA Division III tournaments. In 2025, the men's basketball team won the regular season and tournament titles of the AMCC and advanced to the second round of the NCAA Division III basketball tournament, its third NCAA tournament appearance.
