= Penn State Altoona =

Public college in Logan Township, Pennsylvania, U.S.

Coordinates: 40.53887°N 78.40585°W

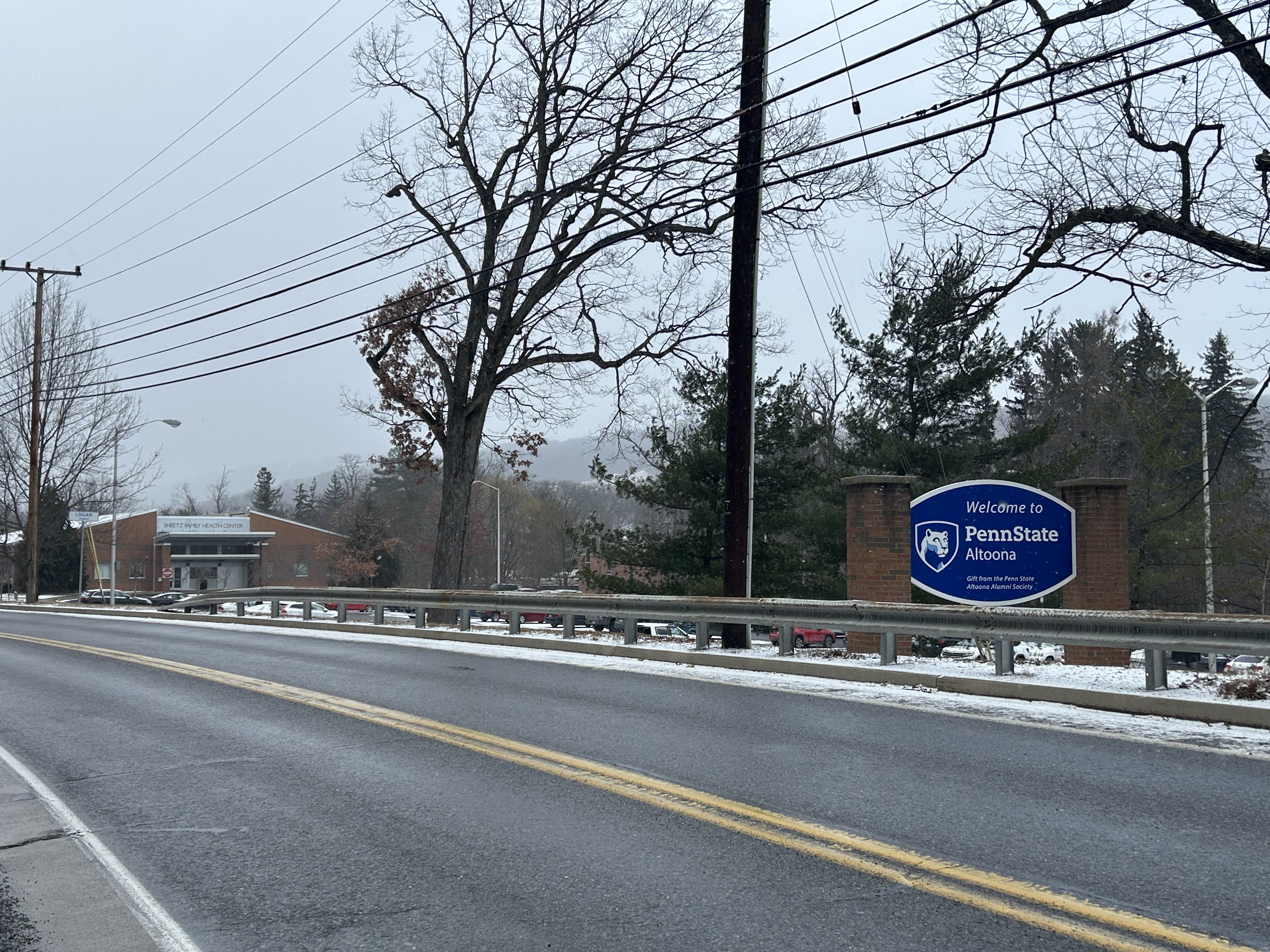
- Sign for Penn State Altoona, with Sheetz Family Health Center in the background.
- Former names: Altoona Undergraduate Center (1939–1958); Altoona Campus of The Pennsylvania State University (1958–1997)
- Motto: "This is My Penn State Altoona, Make it Yours"
- Type: Public satellite campus
- Established: September 13, 1939; 87 years ago
- Parent institution: Pennsylvania State University
- Chancellor: Ron W. Darbeau
- President: Neeli Bendapudi
- Administrative staff: 500
- Students: 2,280 (Fall 2025)
- Undergraduates: 2,280 (Fall 2025)
- Location: Logan Township and Altoona, Pennsylvania, U.S.
- Campus: 171.5 acres (0.694 km^{2})
- Sporting affiliations: NCAA Division III - AMCC
- Mascot: Nittany Lion
- Website: altoona.psu.edu

Penn State Altoona is a public satellite campus of Pennsylvania State University located in Logan Township, Pennsylvania. It is one of four four-year institutions in the university's Commonwealth Campus network. The full-time student count was 2,577 in 2023.

== History ==
In 1939, a citizen's committee led by the Altoona Chamber of Commerce Chairman at the time convinced Ralph D. Hetzel, president of the Pennsylvania State College, to support an undergraduate center in Altoona. In July, the citizen's committee launched a campaign to raise money to renovate an abandoned grade school building to house the new center. More than $5,000 was raised from 8,000 local contributors in two months. The college, named the Altoona Undergraduate Center, opened its doors to just 119 freshmen and nine faculty members.

By 1946, it was clear that the campus population was going to continue to grow and expansion of the campus was imminent. The purchase of the 38 acres of the defunct Ivyside Amusement Park was made for $40,000. The park had been closed in 1944 due to "the war and gas rationing." Properties in the surrounding areas were continued to be purchased totaling over 100 acres by the 1990s. In September 1948, the official relocation was made to Ivyside; this era of the college was dubbed that of "Bathhouse U," a name that referred to the conversion of the former amusement park's bathhouse into "offices, classrooms, laboratories, and [the] library." By 1950, Steven Adler was hired as the Registrar "indicating the enrollment and campus growth was significant enough that someone needed to focus on those issues". In 1955 the college introduced associate degrees in Electrical Engineering and Drafting and Design. The AUC was renamed to the Altoona Campus of The Pennsylvania State University in 1958, with this shortened to just Penn State Altoona on July 1, 1997.

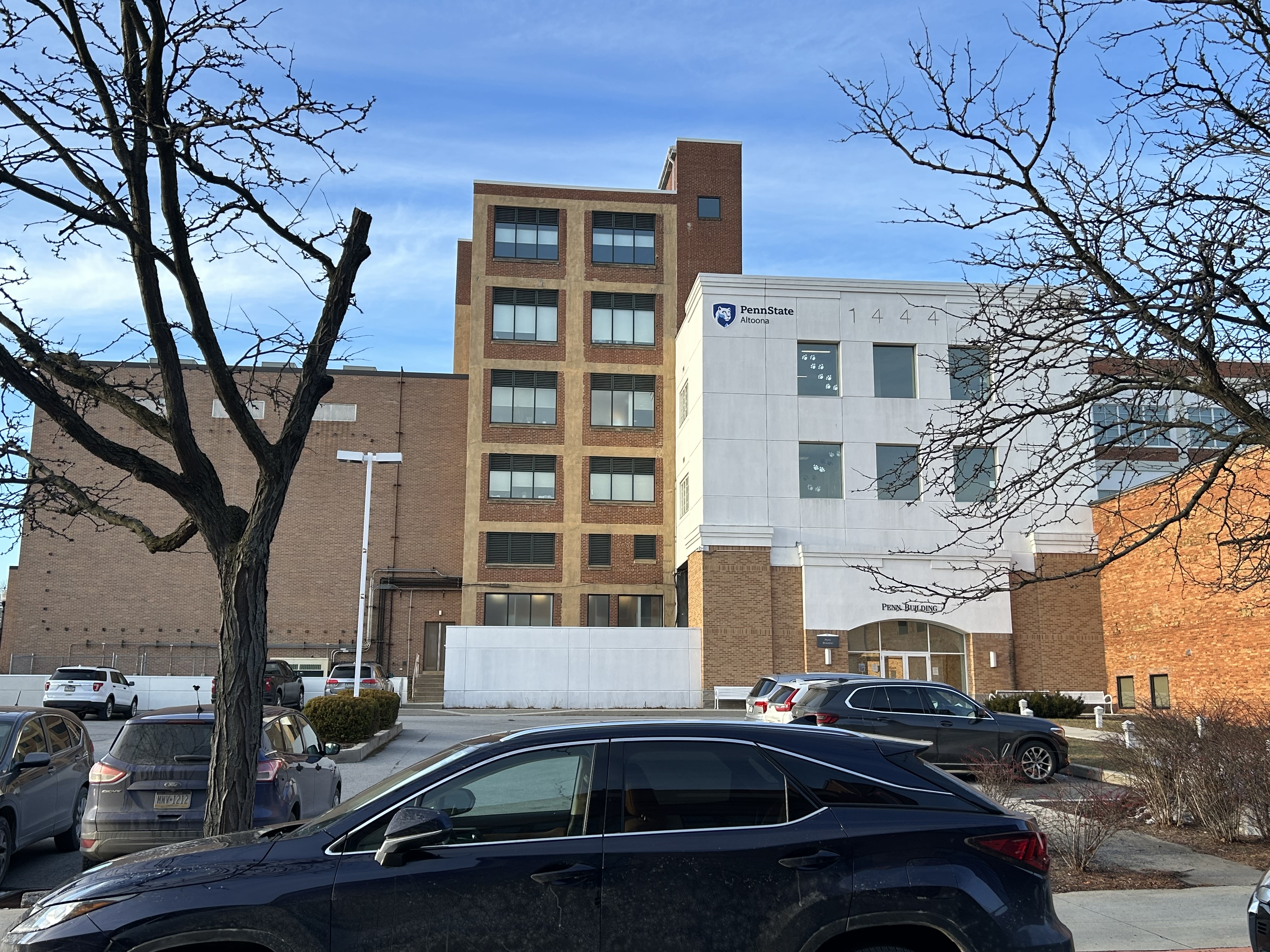
Penn State Altoona's Penn Building, dedicated in 2017.

Penn State Altoona offers internships, research programs and study abroad programs along with continuing education and training. Students can complete their degrees at Penn State Altoona or transfer to another Penn State location.

== Student life ==
Undergraduate demographics as of Fall 2023
Race and ethnicity	Total
White	72%
Hispanic	8%
Black	6%
International student	5%
Asian	4%
Two or more races	4%
Unknown	1%
Economic diversity
Low-income (Note: The percentage of students who received an income-based federal Pell grant intended for low-income students.)	27%
Affluent (Note: The percentage of students who are a part of the American middle class at the bare minimum.)	73%

Currently there are over 75 student groups on campus, including three fraternities, and one sorority, the Sheetz Fellows Program, the Black Student Union, Christian Student Fellowship, Students About Living the Truth, Psychology Club, etc. The student groups are overseen by the Student Government Association, whose other duties include improvement of campus, student advocacy, and distributing money to groups. Student Life also includes many planned events, speakers and musicians, as well as plenty of student organization run events.

== Athletics ==
Penn State Altoona teams participate as a member of the National Collegiate Athletic Association's Division III. The Nittany Lions are a member of the Allegheny Mountain Collegiate Conference. Men's sports include baseball, basketball, golf, swimming & diving, soccer, tennis and volleyball; while women's sports include basketball, bowling, golf, swimming & diving, soccer, softball, tennis and volleyball.

== Greek life ==
There are three social fraternities: Alpha Phi Delta, Sigma Pi, and Chi Rho.

== Housing, Food Services, & Residence Life ==
Penn State Altoona offers its students on campus housing during the fall and spring semesters. Housing options include Oak Hall, Maple Hall, Spruce Hall, and Cedar Hall.
