= Penn State Public Broadcasting =

Penn State Public Broadcasting may refer to:

- WPSU (FM)
- WPSU-TV
