= WPSX =

WPSX may refer to:

- WPSX (FM), a radio station (90.1 FM) licensed to Kane, Pennsylvania, United States
- WPSU-TV, a television station (channel 15) licensed to Clearfield, Pennsylvania, United States, which held the call sign WPSX-TV until October 2005
