= WPSU =

WPSU may refer to:

- WPSU (FM), an NPR member FM radio station in State College, Pennsylvania (91.5 MHz)
- WPSU-TV, a PBS member television broadcast station in State College, Pennsylvania (channel 3, DTV 15)
- Women's Social and Political Union, a militant organisation campaigning for women's suffrage in the United Kingdom, 1903–17
