= Onward State =

Student-run news website in Pennsylvania, United States

- Website type: Student-run news website for the Penn State community
- Founders: Davis Shaver, Eli Glazier, Evan Kalikow
- Editor: Collin Ward
- Website: onwardstate.com
- Users: 16 million annually
- Launched: November 17, 2008; 17 years ago

Onward State is a student-run news website geared toward members of the Penn State community in Pennsylvania. The website provides news, features, and commentary on issues impacting Penn State and State College. Onward State has published more than 34,000 stories since its founding in November 2008. It was voted the "Best Alternative Media Outlet" in a February 2009 online contest by U.S. News & World Report. Onward State has been cited in the New York Times, USA TODAY, ESPN, The Washington Post, and many other national news outlets. The Associated Press has described Onward State as "one of Penn State's smarter, if sometimes-snarky blogs."

Its staff size, including a handful of internally selected editors, fluctuates every semester but generally settles at around 45 people, all Penn State students.

== History ==
Onward State was founded in November 2008 by three freshmen (Davis Shaver, Eli Glazier, and Evan Kalikow) in their dormitories in Simmons Hall on Penn State's campus. The concept for Onward State was spearheaded by Shaver, who believed that other local media outlets were not adapting quickly enough to the digital age. For instance, The Daily Collegian, the official school newspaper, didn't have a Facebook page until 2009 and its Twitter feed was mostly automated links. As Shaver later put it: "At first, I thought that perhaps the idea could be realized through The Daily Collegian, a student newspaper with a deservedly-great reputation. That plan never came to a head, though; at the time, the paper just wasn't interested in doing things differently."

The site's first post, published on November 17, 2008, was an unsubstantiated rumor about Girl Talk performing at Penn State, which ended up being true. The website quickly picked up a small cult following among students, faculty, and administrators. It became known initially for its utility as a news aggregator and its snarky commentary, much of which was directed at then-President Graham Spanier. The site nicknamed Spanier "G-Span", began a satirical column called "The View from the University House" written in his name, and even photoshopped a picture of Spanier in a bikini.

Blogger Alison Go of U.S. News & World Report organized the online contest "Best Alternative Media Outlet" at the beginning of 2009 and Onward State beat blogs from UC Berkeley, Vassar, Wesleyan, Columbia, Georgetown, Middlebury, Yale, and an Ivy League conglomerate. The Daily Collegian first acknowledged Onward State at the time of the website's recognition. In an interview with the Collegian about next year's contest, Shaver explained "We have big ambitions... I think that we're just going to be more established, more of a name within the Penn State community by then. There is a strong possibility of being Alternative Media repeat champions."

On September 21, 2009, after a campus-wide search, Onward State was the first media outlet to report the tragic news that freshman Joe Dado had been found dead in a campus stairwell. It was the first major news break for the website, which resulted in a significant traffic increase and mainstream recognition. Onward State continued the trend toward producing original journalism for a digital audience in the coming years with its coverage of a student riot after the death of Osama Bin Laden, THON, and State Patty's Day. More so than its original news reporting, Onward State became known for irreverent features like "Drunk, Sober, High" and "Overheard at Penn State", along with its more laid student life" reporting style, like its discovery of the only on-campus Coca-Cola machine.

In March 2011, Onward State was sold to a local company called Lazerpro Digital Media Group to ensure sustainability after its original founders graduated and to improve its resources. As part of the partnership, Onward State's all-student staff continues to write, edit, and manage the website's content and day-to-day operations autonomously while Lazerpro manages the website's revenue streams and web hosting.

=== Sandusky Scandal ===
When the Penn State child sex abuse scandal story broke in November 2011, Onward State's traffic increased considerably. Its live coverage and commentary on the fallout caused its Twitter following to double—from 7,500 to 15,000—in only two weeks. The traffic surge was so overwhelming that the website's server crashed as it handled approximately ten times the normal number of readers. A constantly updated live blog provided updates to its readers as the story became a national fixation.

== Criticism ==
=== Paterno Death Error ===
On January 21, 2012, Onward State's official Twitter account tweeted "Our sources can now confirm: Joseph Vincent Paterno has passed away tonight at the age of 85." This tweet, described by The Patriot-News as "an unconfirmed rumor about an anonymous email [that] was taken and reported as fact," was picked up and re-reported by CBS Sports who repeated the rumor, citing Onward State specifically as the source of the information. The national media quickly followed and reported Paterno's death as fact, before the Paterno family issued a statement that he was, in fact, still alive. Later that day, Onward State's managing editor resigned, saying "I never, in a million years, would have thought that Onward State would be cited by the national media, and today, I sincerely wish it never had been. To all those who read and passed along our reports, I sincerely apologize for misleading you." Paterno died the next day. Onward State explained that they had believed the death reports to be true after receiving an email supposedly sent to the football team (later determined to be a hoax) and confirmation of the email from a writer "whom [Onward State editors] later found out had not been honest in his information."

== Impact ==
Onward State maintains a rivalry with The Daily Collegian, the traditional student newspaper for the Penn State community.

Onward State celebrated its 5th birthday in November 2013. More than 100 alumni, friends, and current staff members returned to campus for a quinquennial banquet to celebrate the first five years of the website. Penn State acknowledged the anniversary.

In February 2014, Onward State broke the story that then Florida State University President Eric J. Barron had accepted an offer to become Penn State's president.

During a campaign rally on the University of Pittsburgh's campus in April 2016, presidential candidate Donald Trump asked the crowd "How's Joe Paterno? We going to bring that back? How about that whole deal?" When asked to clarify the question, a campaign spokesperson said that Trump was referring to the bronze statue of Joe Paterno that formerly stood in front of Beaver Stadium "that they melted down," which errantly referenced a fictitious Onward State April Fool's Day story from the previous year as fact.

As part of its community mission, Onward State has planned local charity events and hosts a weekly radio talk show on The LION 90.7 FM called "Onward State Old Timey Audio Hour."

In December 2021, Onward State broke the story that University of Louisville President Dr. Neeli Bendapudi would serve as the next president of the university, following Barron's announced retirement in June 2022.

Following the 2021-2022 academic year, Onward State was recorded as having the most online engagement of any collegiate student media outlet in the United States. Onward State, which garnered 810,843 shares, had over 300,000 more than the No. 2 ranked outlet –– the University of Florida centric Independent Florida Gator, with 470,683 shares.

In February 2026, Onward State was first to report then-Penn State hockey star Gavin McKenna's felony charge after an altercation at downtown State College bar Doggie's Pub. The story, which quickly became national news due to McKenna's NHL prospects, remains one of the site's most popular ever.
