= WPSU-TV =

Television station in Clearfield, Pennsylvania

- Clearfield–State College–; Johnstown–Altoona, Pennsylvania; United States
- City: Clearfield, Pennsylvania
- Channels: Digital: 15 (UHF); Virtual: 3
- Branding: WPSU

Programming
- Affiliations: 3.1: PBS; for others, see § Subchannels

Ownership
- Owner: WHYY, Inc.

History
- First air date: March 1, 1965
- Former call signs: WSUP-TV (CP, 1964); WPSX-TV (1964–2005)
- Former channel numbers: Analog: 3 (VHF, 1965–2009)
- Former affiliations: NET (1965–1970)
- Call sign meaning: Pennsylvania State University (former owner)

Technical information
- Licensing authority: FCC
- Facility ID: 66219
- ERP: DTS1: 810 kW; DTS2: 48 kW
- HAAT: DTS1: 412.8 m (1,354 ft); DTS2: 281.6 m (924 ft)
- Transmitter coordinates: DTS1: 41°7′20.2″N 78°26′28.9″W; DTS2: 40°42′47″N 77°54′0″W

Links
- Public license information: Public file; LMS
- Website: wpsu.org

WPSU-TV (channel 3) is a PBS member television station licensed to Clearfield, Pennsylvania, United States, serving West-Central Pennsylvania. Owned by WHYY, Inc., it is sister to NPR member WPSU (91.5 FM) and student radio station WKPS ("The Lion 90.7 FM"). The three stations share studios at the Outreach Building at Innovation Park on Penn State's University Park campus on Innovation Boulevard in State College. WPSU-TV's primary transmitter is located seven miles (11 km) north of Clearfield in Lawrence Township, with a secondary transmitter in Pine Grove Mills, Pennsylvania.

== History ==
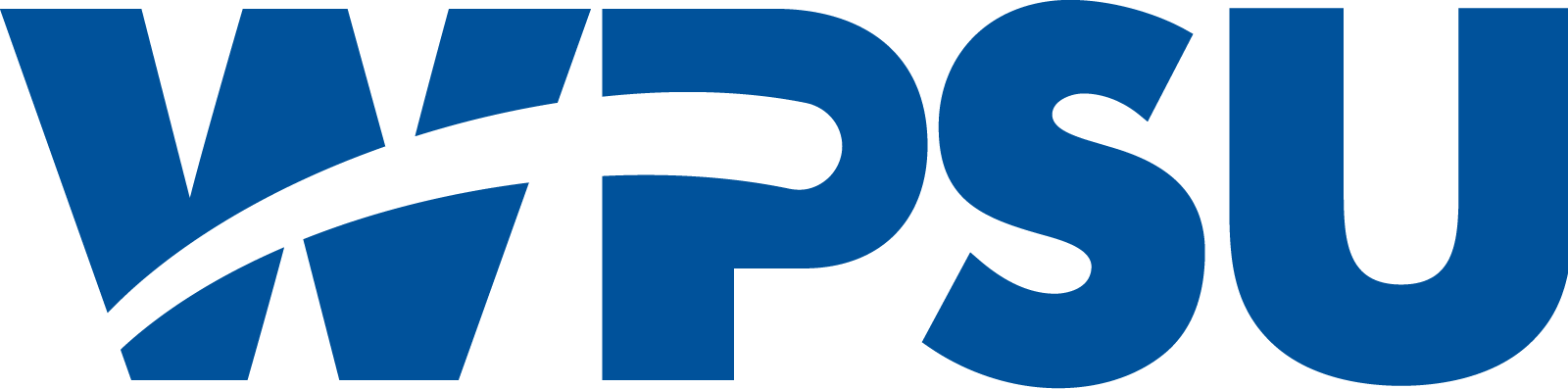
Former WPSU logo, used until 2015.

Pennsylvania State University (Penn State) has a long history of using new media to extend access to education. It was the first American institution of higher education to offer agricultural correspondence courses in 1892. When radio became popular in the 1920s, the institution tried broadcasting courses and was the first U.S. university to experiment with closed-circuit television delivery in the 1940s. Penn State hosted a conference on April 20, 1952, at Nittany Lion Inn where the federal government announced its decision to set aside bandwidth to support non-commercial educational television stations. This conference led to the creation of national educational television broadcasting and later to the creation of PBS.

After Congress passed the Educational Facilities Act on May 1, 1962, which provided federal funding for the construction of educational television stations, Penn State was granted a transmitter construction permit in September 1964 and became the first educational television station in Pennsylvania to be licensed to a university, and the 101st such station in the U.S.

Construction of the tower and transmitter site began on Penfield Mountain, seven miles (11 km) north of Clearfield. The 539-foot (164 m) tower was built on Rattlesnake Mountain to comply with the FCC "legal triangle" that required 170 miles (274 km) to separate co-channels. Because the Wagner Annex studio was not yet completed, video playback machines, film and slide chains, and audio tape equipment were installed at the transmitter site in conjunction with a "mobile recording unit".

The "X" in the original call sign WPSX-TV denoted the station's role as part of Penn State's Continuing Education program, also known as the Penn State Extension. "The establishment of the station," said Dr. Eric Walker, then-president of the university, "will enable Penn State to expand its educational services".

WPSX-TV was led by Marlow Froke, director of the Division of Broadcasting at Penn State, as a unit of Continuing Education. On March 1, 1965, under his leadership in cooperation with the newly-formed Allegheny Educational Broadcast Council (AEBC) advisory board, WPSX-TV broadcast to 124 elementary and secondary schools across Pennsylvania to supplement the curriculum and provide in-service training for teachers. The first day's lineup included Saludos Amigos, Primary Concepts in Math, Focus on Fitness, and 12 other programs between 10 a.m. and 3 p.m. Froke, a former journalism instructor and radio-television newsman, said in a 1965 Altoona Mirror interview, "Television can combine all the channels of communication—sight, sound, and motion—to give the greatest impact on the student". During the first WPSX-TV broadcast school year, the classroom TV service reached approximately 250,000 students in 22 counties.

Evening programs of culture, public affairs, and adult education were added on June 7, 1965, in a Monday-to-Friday, 7–11 p.m. schedule. Saturday and Sunday programming was not added until nearly two years later.

Once the microwave link that carried the broadcast signal to Wagner was completed, WPSX-TV began moving its broadcast and studio operations to its new facility. On December 10, 1965, engineering, production, and programming staff were all based at the Wagner studios for the first time and remained there until a new digital broadcast facility was dedicated on September 8, 2005, as the Outreach Building in Innovation Park.

WPSX-TV drew upon Penn State's faculty and staff to develop original programming for the new evening lineup. Art History 10, which was hosted by assistant professor of art history Carl Barnes and covered painting, architecture, and sculpture, was the first University credit course to be produced for broadcast in late 1965. Public affairs programs covered national, state, and University issues. In 1969, P. J. O'Connell produced The Year Behind, the Year Ahead, reporting on the events that led to the student sit-in protest on Old Main Lawn.

O'Connell and co-producer Kimberlie Kranich went on the create the Rural American Documentary Project (later renamed Pennsylvania Parade) with more than 150 titles that captured the life, joys, and struggles of rural Pennsylvanians, including Notes on an Appalachia County: Visiting with Darlene, Notes on an American Business, and Profiles of Rural Religion: Go and I'll Be With You.

In the midst of this growth, the public television movement gained traction, which signified the creation of the Corporation for Public Broadcasting (CPB) in 1967 and two years later PBS to manage the programming of public television national interconnections.

In the 1970s, the station joined a statewide community service project, broadcasting programs that focused on community issues and organizing community meetings in the viewing area. Children's shows were developed with the College of Education. A popular weekly current affairs program What's in the News went national.

The shift of PBS stations to satellite communication brought several innovations to WPSX-TV. In 1978, WPSX-TV joined the Appalachian Educational Satellite Project (AESP) which delivered teacher education courses, nursing courses, and other educational resources to isolated communities in the Appalachian chain. WPSX-TV set up its first national satellite conference from Penn State in 1980 for the faculty in Nuclear Engineering, which extended access to education for adult, part-time learners. WPSX-TV and a group of cable operators also helped set up PENNARAMA, a 24-hour channel that offered credit courses and other educational programs.

Meanwhile, the radio station WDFM was renamed WPSU-FM in August 1984. It broadcast student programming, classical music, and news. In 1986, it started to air NPR programs such as All Things Considered (June 1986) and Morning Edition (fall 1987). In 1994, WPSU-FM joined WPSX-TV to become Penn State Public Broadcasting. WPSX-TV began 24-hour broadcast schedules in 1998.

With the advent of digital television broadcasting, WPSX-TV became an innovator of distributed transmission of digital television signals. In 2003, experiments conducted by WPSX-TV helped develop FCC standards for implementation of the distributed transmission systems, and its digital channel was used to experiment with the format.

On October 15, 2005, WPSX-TV was re-called as WPSU-TV. The following summer, both WPSU-TV and WPSU-FM began broadcasting from new facilities at the Outreach Building in Innovation Park, State College.

On September 11, 2025, WPSU announced that it would wind down and cease operations by June 30, 2026, after the Penn State Board of Trustees voted unanimously against a proposal that would have transferred ownership of the television station and its sister radio station WPSU-FM to WHYY in Philadelphia. This was reconsidered in October, and the board approved the sale of WPSU to WHYY. The transaction was completed on October 1, 2026.

== List of WPSU-TV's original programs ==
=== Current ===
- As Long as We Dance: New Faces of a Traditional American Indian Powwow
- Centre County Report
- Conversations from Penn State
- Conversations Live
- Courtside with Coquese
- The Geospatial Revolution
- Higher Education in Focus
- Music from Penn State
- Our Town series
- Penn State Basketball: In the Paint Presented by Pepsi
- Telling Amy's Story
- Water Blues Green Solutions
- Weather World
- Why We Dance: The Story of THON

=== Former ===
- Center Court with Rene Portland
- Children and Autism: Time is Brain
- Dirt Track Memories
- Fred Waring's U.S. Chorus
- Grange Fair: An American Tradition
- Great Teachers: Making a Difference
- Houses of Worship
- Huddle Up Nittany Lion Fans
- Legendary Lighthouses (1998, Driftwood Productions)
- A Look at Autism
- Making the Blue Band
- Our Town: The Kids' Cut
- Outdoor Pennsylvania
- PA Energy
- Penn State: Access Granted
- The Pennsylvania Game (1986–2003)
- Pennsylvania Inside Out
- Raise the Song: The History of Penn State
- Scholastic Scrimmage (until 2009)
- Small Ball: A Little League Story
- Surviving the Housing Crisis
- Swift: Eyes Through Time
- To the Best of My Knowledge
- Tracks Across the Sky
- Wednesday Quarterbacks/Joe Paterno's TV Quarterbacks (1965–?)
- What Matters
- What's in the News (1978–2004)
- The WPSU-TV Alphabet Cooking Show
- Your Health

== Technical information ==
=== Subchannels ===
The station's signal is multiplexed:

Subchannels of WPSU-TV
Subchannel	Res.	Short name	Programming
3.1	1080i	WPSU-HD	PBS
3.2	480i	Create	Create
3.3	480i	World	World
3.4	480i	PBSKIDS	PBS Kids

=== Analog-to-digital conversion ===
WPSU-TV shut down its analog signal, over VHF channel 3, on April 22, 2009. The station's digital signal remained on its pre-transition UHF channel 15, using virtual channel 3.

=== Distributed transmission ===
WPSU-TV is an innovator of distributed transmission of digital television signals; it has been involved with testing new ways to distribute these signals to difficult reception areas and received an experimental permit from the FCC in 2003. Initial tests showed that while a large UHF channel 15 transmitter at the location of WPSU's original low-VHF broadcast tower would encounter localized problems with terrain shielding that interfere with UHF reception in State College, and that relocation of the main transmitter would have interfered with the station's ability to serve the other two communities, the addition of a 50 kW, precisely-synchronized digital transmitter operating in State College itself on the same frequency as the main UHF 15 signal could provide a viable improvement to digital reception.

This work was the basis for a pair of ATSC standards issued in 2004 to provide design guidance for the implementation of distributed transmission systems:

- A/110A, "Synchronization Standard for Distributed Transmission, Revision A"
- A/111, "Design of Synchronized Multiple Transmitter Networks"

These standards were later used by other broadcasters, such as New York City's Metropolitan Television Alliance, as a basis of tests in 2007. This testing was crucial to other U.S. television stations and the FCC for developing guidelines pertaining to this type of broadcasting.
