= Pennsylvania State University =

Public university in Pennsylvania, US

The Pennsylvania State University
- Former names: List: Farmer's High School of Pennsylvania (1855–1862); Agricultural College of Pennsylvania (1862–1874); The Pennsylvania State College (1874–1953); Dickinson School of Law (1834–2000); The Chestnut Street Female Seminary (1850–1883); The Ogontz School for Girls (1883–1950); Wyomissing Polytechnic Institute (1930–1958); Pennsylvania State Forest Academy (1903–1929)
- Motto: On seal: "Virtue, Liberty, and Independence"
- Type: Public state-related land-grant research university
- Established: February 22, 1855; 171 years ago
- Accreditation: MSCHE
- Academic affiliations: AAU; ORAU; UARC; URA; Sea-grant; Space-grant; Sun-grant
- Endowment: $5.06 billion (2025)
- Chairperson: David M. Kleppinger
- President: Neeli Bendapudi
- Provost: Fotis Sotiropoulos
- Academic staff: 8,002
- Administrative staff: 17,218
- Students: 86,557 (fall 2025)
- Undergraduates: 72,456 (fall 2025) 42,822 (University Park)
- Postgraduates: 12,618 (fall 2025) 6,001 (University Park)
- Other students: Law: 824 (fall 2025) 451 (University Park) Medical: 659 (fall 2025) (Hershey)
- Location: University Park, Pennsylvania, United States; 40°47′54″N 77°51′36″W
- Campus: 7,343 acres (2,972 ha) Total (statewide), 22,484 acres (9,099 ha); Small city
- Other campuses: Abington; Greater Allegheny; Altoona; Beaver; Berks; Brandywine; Carlisle; DuBois; Erie; Fayette; Great Valley; Harrisburg; Hazleton; Hershey; Lehigh Valley; Mont Alto; New Kensington; Scranton; Schuylkill; Shenango; Wilkes-Barre; York; World
- Newspaper: The Daily Collegian; Onward State; The Altoona Collegiate Review; The Roar; The Lion's Eye; The Behrend Beacon
- Colors: Blue and white
- Nicknames: Nittany Lions; Lady Lions; Behrend Lions; Roaring Lions; Lions
- Sporting affiliations: NCAA Division I FBS – Big Ten; EIVA; AHA; AMCC; MPSF; CWPA; ECAC; MAISA; UEC; PSUAC
- Mascot: Nittany Lion
- Website: www.psu.edu
- ASN: 3999

U.S. National Register of Historic Places
- Official name: Ag Hill Complex
- Type: Building
- Criteria: Event, Architecture/Engineering
- Designated: January 12, 1979
- Reference no.: 79002191

U.S. National Register of Historic Places
- Official name: Farmers' High School
- Type: District
- Criteria: Event, Architecture/Engineering
- Designated: September 11, 1981
- Reference no.: 81000538

Pennsylvania Historical Marker
- Official name: Pennsylvania State University, The
- Type: Roadside
- Designated: April 30, 1947

The Pennsylvania State University (Penn State or PSU) is a public state-related land-grant research university with campuses and facilities throughout Pennsylvania, United States. Founded in 1855 as the Farmers' High School of Pennsylvania, Penn State was named the state's first land-grant university eight years later. Its primary campus, known as Penn State University Park, is located in State College and College Township in Centre County.

Penn State enrolls more than 89,000 students, of which more than 74,000 are undergraduates and more than 14,000 are postgraduates. In addition to its land-grant designation, the university is a sea-grant, space-grant, and sun-grant university. It is classified among "R1: Doctoral Universities – Very high research activity" and is a member of the Association of American Universities (AAU). The university has two law schools: Penn State Law on the school's University Park campus and Penn State Dickinson Law in Carlisle. The College of Medicine is in Hershey. The university maintains 19 Commonwealth Campuses and 5 special mission campuses located across Pennsylvania.

Most of its athletic teams, known collectively as the Penn State Nittany Lions, compete in the Big Ten Conference in Division I of the NCAA. Since its founding, Penn State has won 82 national collegiate team championships, including 54 NCAA titles across all sports, and Penn State students, alumni, faculty, and coaches have won a total of 74 Olympic medals, including 20 gold medals.

== History ==
=== 19th century ===
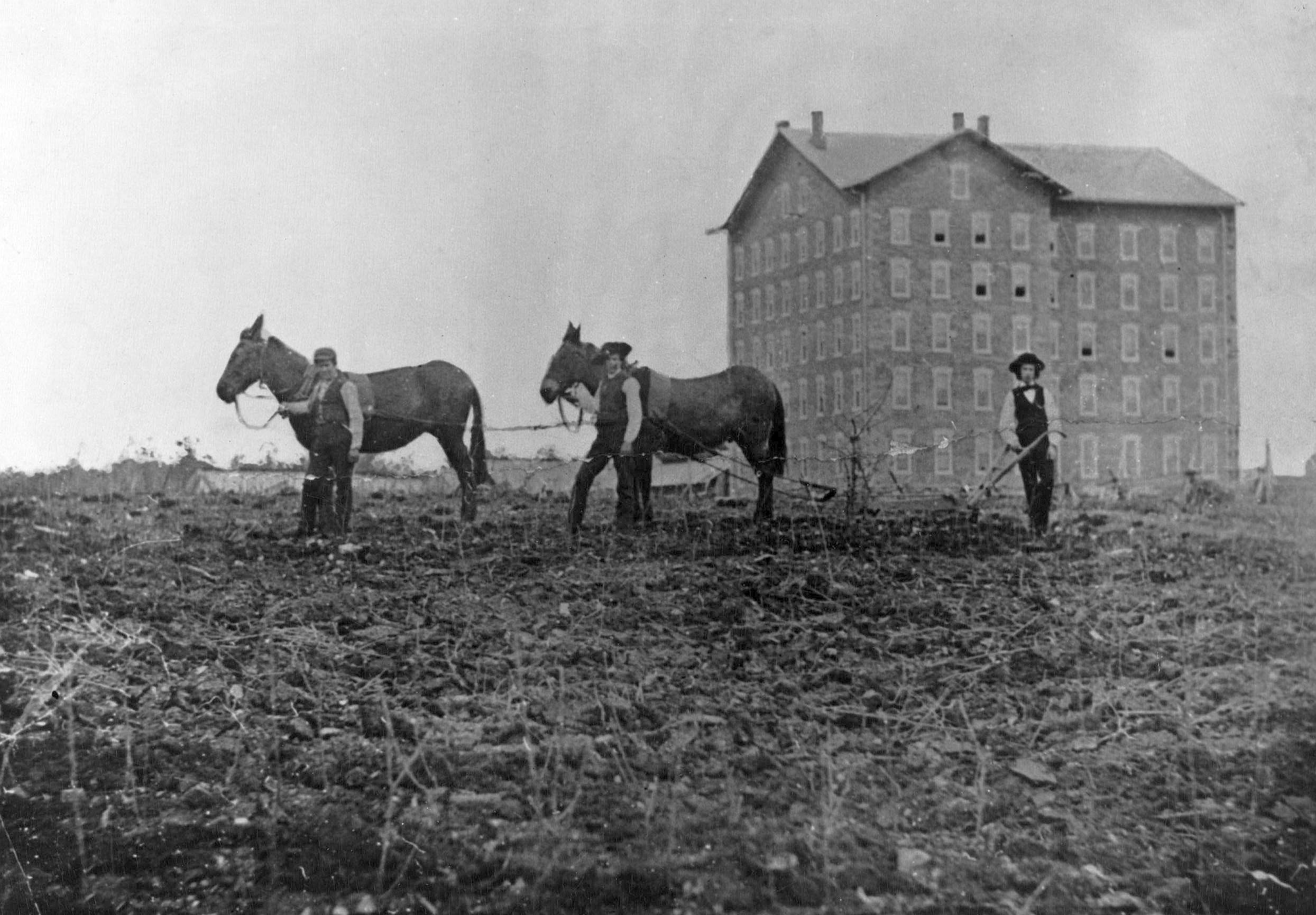
Old Main at Penn State in 1855

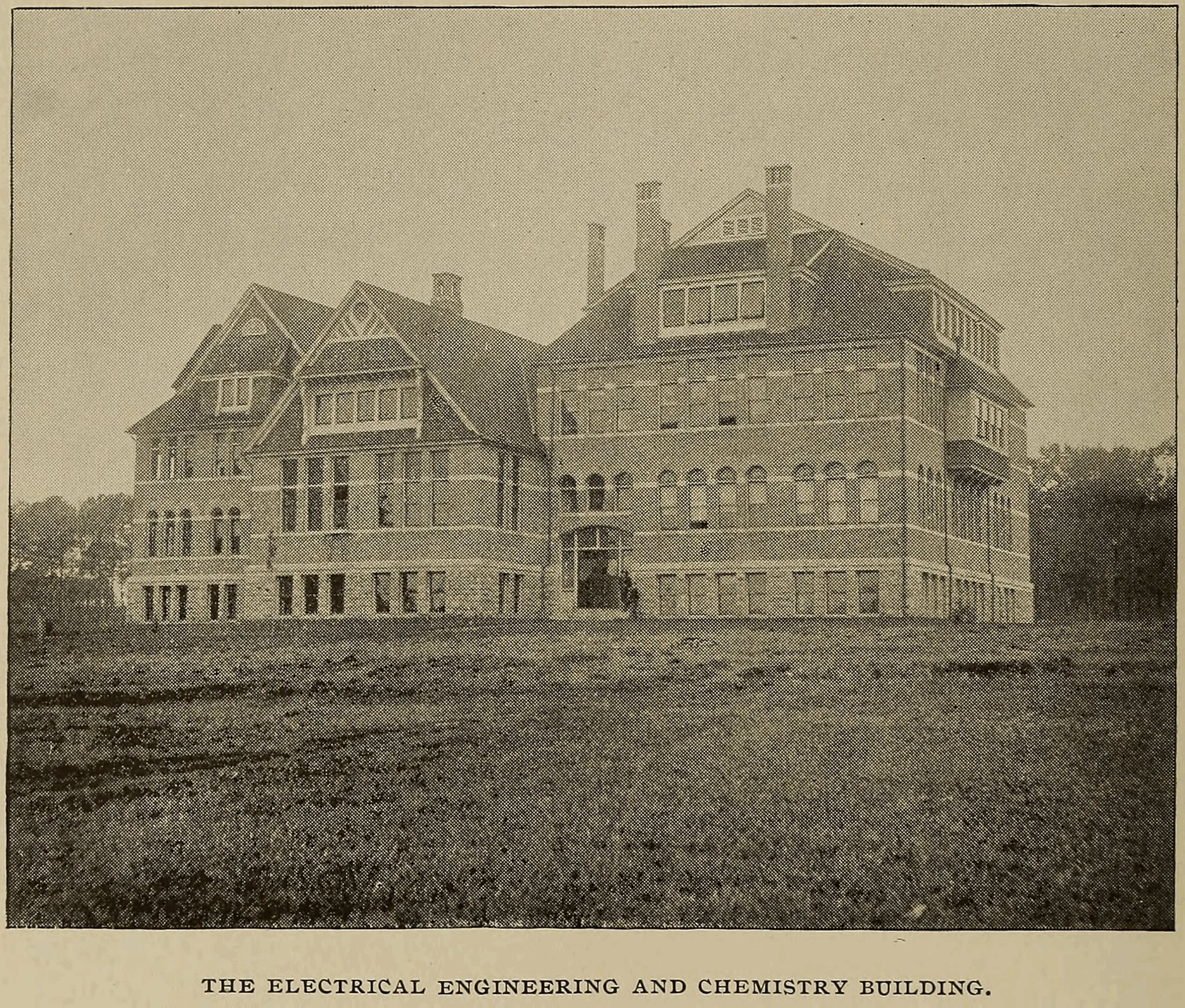
The university's Electrical Engineering and Chemistry Building, c. 1894

Pennsylvania State University was founded in 1855 when James Irvin, a U.S. congressman from Bellefonte, donated 200 acres (0.8 km^{2}) of land in Centre County to the newly-established Farmers' High School of Pennsylvania, representing the first of 10,101 acres (41 km^{2}) the school eventually acquired.

The same year, on February 22, the Pennsylvania General Assembly designated the school a degree-granting institution. Initially sponsored by the Pennsylvania State Agricultural Society, the use of "college" or "university" was avoided in the school's naming since local Pennsylvanians perceived that such institutions were impractical in their curricula.

In 1862, the school's name was changed to the Agricultural College of Pennsylvania. The following year, in 1863, the Morrill Land-Grant Acts was passed by the U.S. Congress, and Pennsylvania selected the school to be the state's sole land-grant college. Two years later, in 1874, the school's name was changed to the Pennsylvania State College.

By 1875, enrollment fell to 64 undergraduates, and the school attempted to balance its primary focus on agricultural studies with classic education. In 1882, George W. Atherton was named the school's president; Atherton set about broadening the curriculum beyond its agricultural focus.

The school developed an engineering studies program that immediately became one of the nation's ten largest engineering schools.

A major road in State College was later named in Atherton's honor. Penn State's Atherton Hall, a well-furnished and centrally located residence hall, was named after George Atherton's wife, Frances Washburn Atherton.

=== 20th century ===
In the 20th century, Penn State grew significantly, becoming the largest grantor of baccalaureate degrees in Pennsylvania. In 1936, its enrollment reached 5,000. Around this time, Ralph D. Hetzel, the school's president, established a commonwealth of colleges to provide an alternative for Depression-era students who were economically unable to leave home to attend college.

In 1953, President Milton S. Eisenhower, the brother of then-U.S. President Dwight D. Eisenhower, sought and won permission to elevate the school to university status, and it assumed its current name, The Pennsylvania State University. Under Eisenhower's successor, Eric A. Walker, the university acquired hundreds of acres of surrounding land, and enrollment nearly tripled.

In 1967, the Penn State Milton S. Hershey Medical Center, a college of medicine and hospital, was established in Hershey with a $50 million gift from the Hershey Trust Company.

In 1970s, the university became a state-related institution, leading to its membership in the Commonwealth System of Higher Education. In 1975, the lyrics in the Penn State Alma Mater were revised to be gender-neutral in honor of International Women's Year; the revised lyrics were taken from the posthumously published autobiography of the writer of the original lyrics, Fred Lewis Pattee. Professor Patricia Farrell acted as a spokesperson for those who wanted the change.

In 1989, the Pennsylvania College of Technology in Williamsport became affiliated with the university.

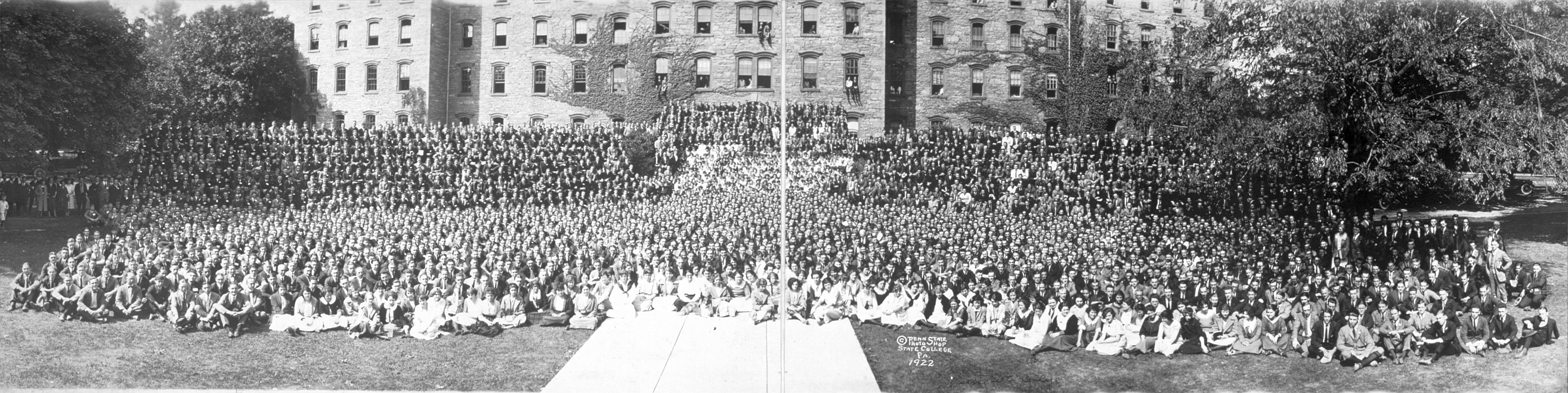
Students on the campus of present-day Penn State University Park, the university's main campus, c. 1922

=== 21st century ===
In 2000, Dickinson School of Law joined the Pennsylvania College of Technology in affiliating with the university. The university is now the largest in Pennsylvania, and in 2003, it was credited with having the second-largest impact on the state economy of any organization, generating an economic effect of over $17 billion on a budget of $2.5 billion. To offset the lack of funding due to the limited growth in state appropriations to Penn State, the university has concentrated its efforts on philanthropy (2003 marked the end of the Grand Destiny campaign—a seven-year effort that raised over $1.3 billion).

==== Child sex abuse scandal ====
In 2011, the university and its football program garnered international media attention and criticism in a sex abuse scandal in which university officials were alleged to have covered up incidents of child sexual abuse by former football team defensive coordinator Jerry Sandusky. Athletic director Timothy Curley and Gary Schultz, senior vice president for finance and business, were indicted for perjury. In the wake of the scandal, Coach Joe Paterno was fired and school president Graham B. Spanier was forced to resign by the board of trustees. Sandusky, who maintained his innocence, was indicted and subsequently convicted in June 2012 on 45 counts of child sexual abuse.

A subcommittee of the board of trustees engaged former FBI director Louis Freeh to head an independent investigation on the university's handling of the incidents. Freeh released his findings in July 2012 in which he claimed that Paterno, Spanier, Curley, and Schultz "conceal[ed] Sandusky's activities from the board of trustees, the university community and authorities" and "failed to protect against a child sexual predator harming children for over a decade". Subsequently, the National Collegiate Athletic Association levied sanctions against Penn State for its role in the scandal, penalizing the Penn State football program with a $60 million fine, a ban from bowl games and post-season play for four years, a reduction in its scholarships from 25 to 15 annually for four years, the vacating of all Penn State football wins from 1998 to 2011, and a five-year probationary period.

Following imposition of the NCAA sanctions, emails surfaced indicating that high-level NCAA officials did not believe they had the jurisdiction to pass down the original sanctions. Subsequent emails, brought forward under subpoena, quoted an NCAA vice president, who wrote, "I characterized our approach to PSU as a bluff when talking to Mark [Emmert, NCAA president]...He basically agreed [because] I think he understands that if we made this an enforcement issue, we may win the immediate battle but lose the war."

On September 8, 2014, following a report by former U.S. senator and athletics integrity monitor George J. Mitchell citing progress by Penn State in implementing reforms, the NCAA repealed the sanctions. On January 16, 2015, all previous Penn State football records were restored.

An investigation led by former U.S. attorney general Richard Thornburgh, who the Paterno family retained to review the Freeh report, alleged that the report that placed so much blame on Penn State and Paterno was a "rush to injustice" that could not be relied upon. He found that not only did the evidence "fall far short" of showing Paterno attempted to conceal the Sandusky scandal, but rather that "the contrary is true". In November 2014, Pennsylvania state senator Jake Corman released further emails that he claimed showed "regular and substantive" contact between NCAA officials and Freeh's investigators, suggesting that Freeh's conclusions were orchestrated.

==== Death of Timothy Piazza ====
On February 2, 2017, Timothy Piazza, a pledge of the Beta Theta Pi fraternity located off-campus in State College, died while undergoing hazing activities at the fraternity. Eighteen members of Penn State's Beta Theta Pi fraternity were initially charged in connection with Piazza's death, and the fraternity was closed and banned indefinitely. In July 2024, the fraternity president and vice president and pledge master each pleaded guilty to 14 misdemeanor counts of hazing and a misdemeanor count of recklessly endangering another person.

== Campuses ==
=== University Park ===
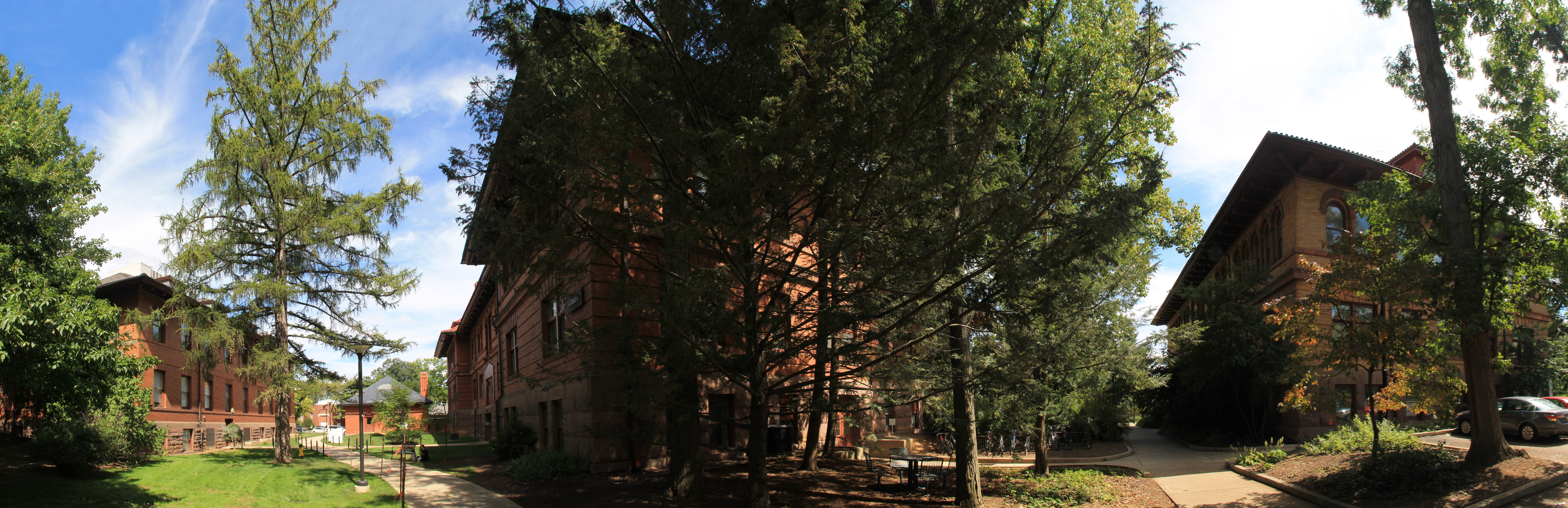
A panoramic view of the Ag Hill Complex at the university in September 2012

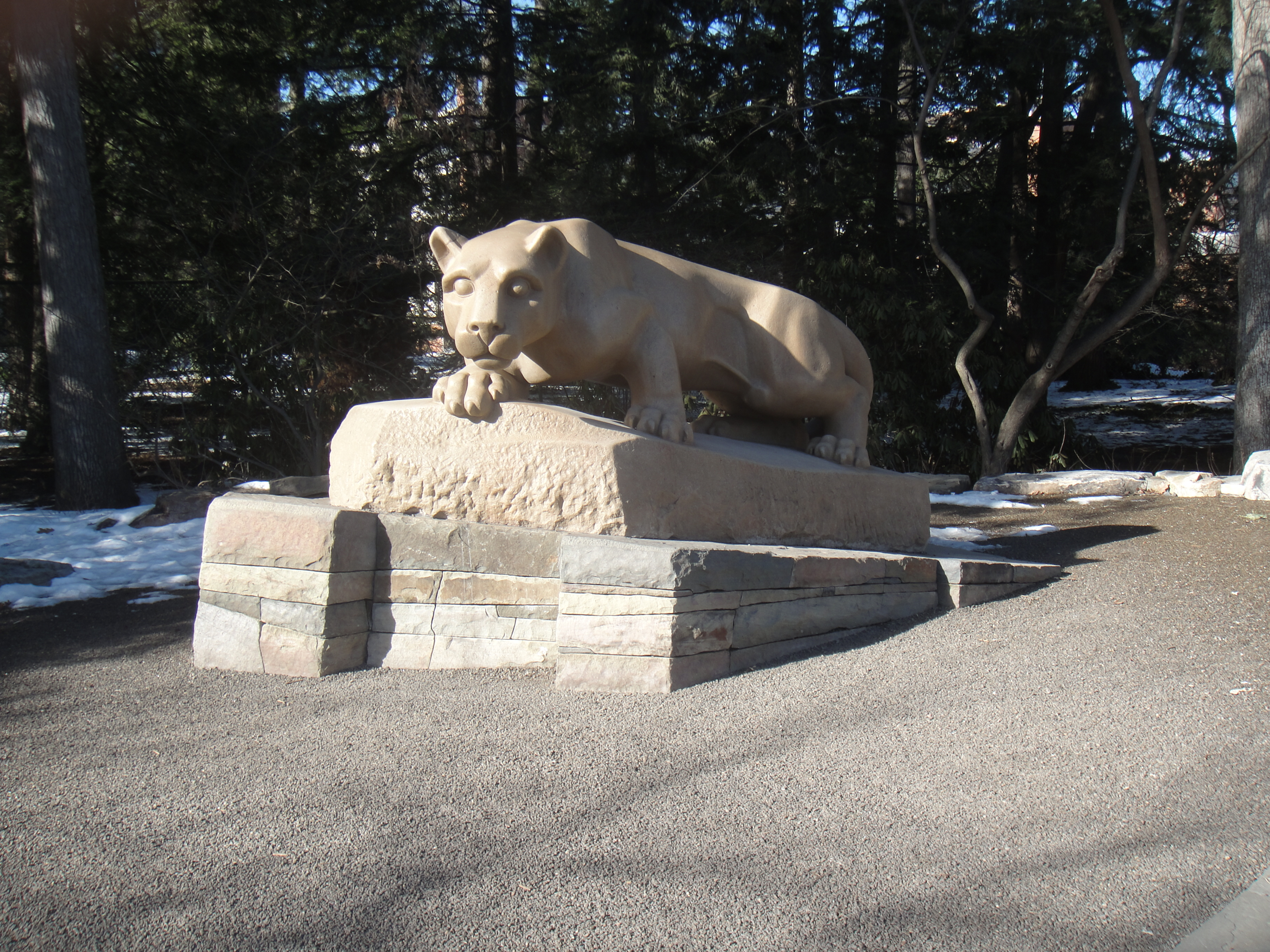
Nittany Lion Shrine on the university's main campus in March 2014

The largest of the university's 24 campuses, Penn State University Park is located in State College and College Township in Centre County, in central Pennsylvania. Its dedicated ZIP Code is 16802. With an undergraduate acceptance rate of 49 percent, it is the most selective campus in the Penn State system. The university ranks among the most selective schools in Pennsylvania, according to various publications. During the fall 2018 semester, 40,363 undergraduate students and 5,907 graduate students were enrolled at University Park. Of those, 46.5 percent were female and 42.4 percent were non-Pennsylvania residents.

The University Park campus is centrally located at the junction of Interstate 99/U.S. Route 220 and U.S. Route 322, and is due south of Interstate 80. Before the arrival of the Interstates, University Park was a short distance from the Lock Haven–Altoona branch line of the Pennsylvania Railroad. The last run of long-distance trains from Buffalo or Harrisburg through Lock Haven was in 1971. Today, the nearest Amtrak passenger rail access is in Tyrone, 25 miles to the southwest. Intercity bus service to University Park is provided by Fullington Trailways, Greyhound Lines, Megabus, and OurBus. The State College Regional Airport, serving two regional airlines, is near University Park.

=== Commonwealth Campuses ===
A map depicting the locations of Penn State's 19 Commonwealth Campuses and the main Penn State University Park campus

In addition to the University Park campus, 19 campus locations throughout the commonwealth of Pennsylvania offer enrollment for undergraduate students. Over 60 percent of Penn State first-year students begin their education at a location other than University Park. Each campus offers a unique set of degree programs based on the student demographics. Any student in good academic standing is guaranteed a spot at University Park to finish their degree if required or desired, known as "change of campus," or "the 2+2 program," where a Penn State student may start at any Penn State campus for two years and finish at another Penn State campus for the remaining years.

Seven of the 19 Commonwealth Campuses are slated to close by the end of the 2027 academic year due to enrollment declines and financial pressure.

=== Special mission campuses and World Campus ===
==== Special mission campuses ====
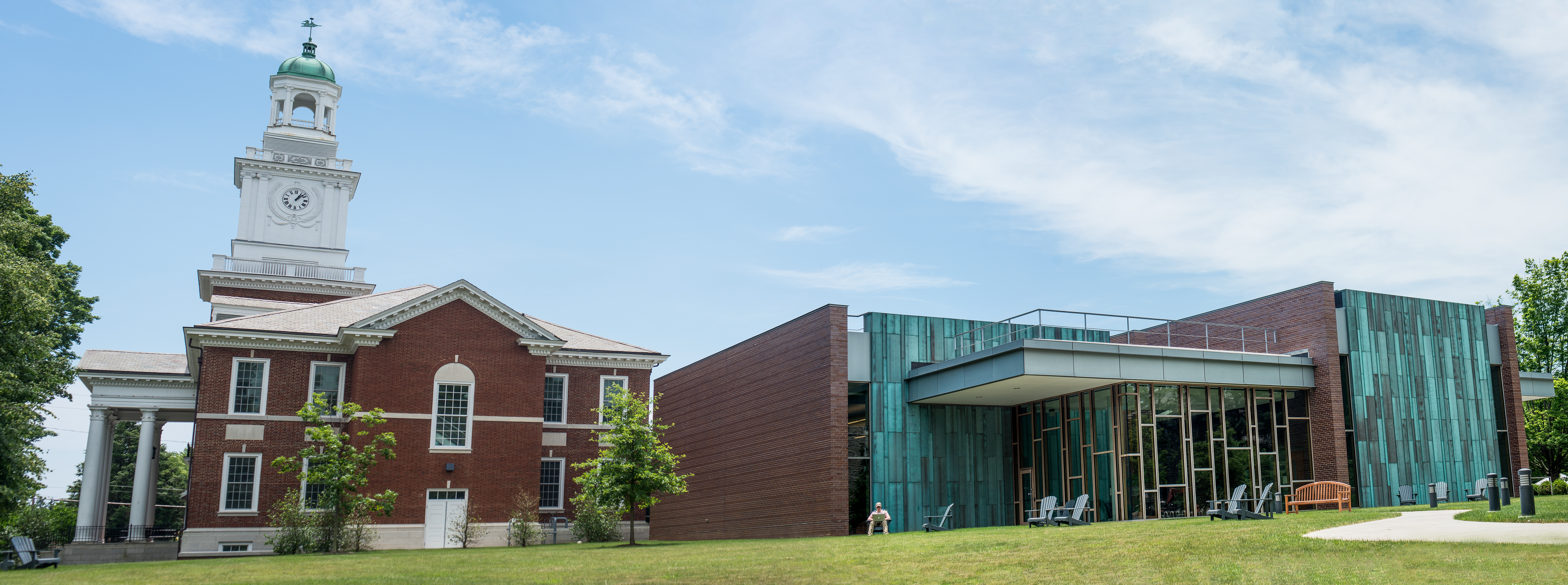
Penn State Dickinson Law in Carlisle in October 2013

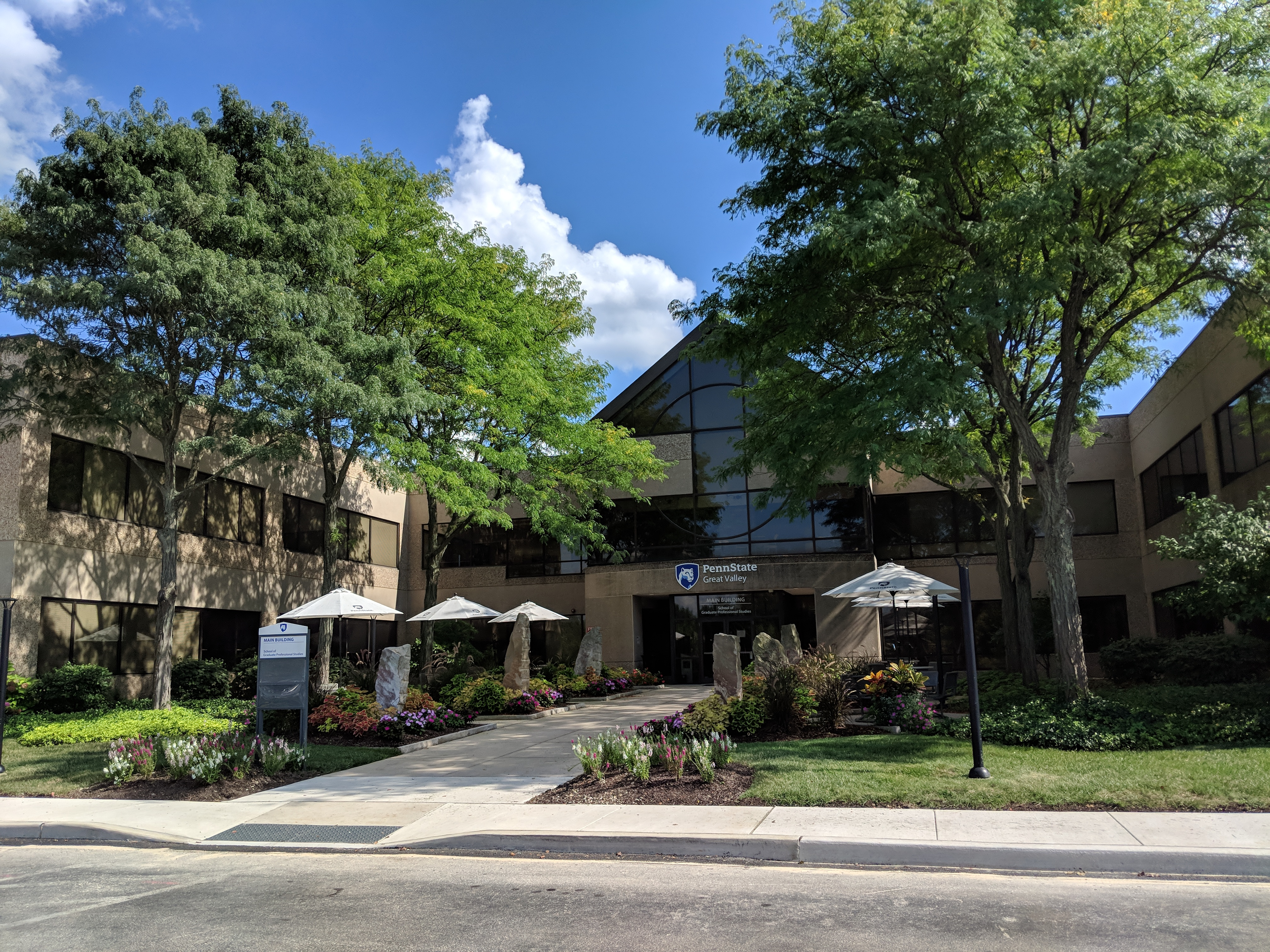
The Main Building at Penn State Great Valley in Malvern, in September 2018

- Dickinson Law, founded in 1834 as The Dickinson School of Law in Carlisle, is the oldest law school in Pennsylvania and the fifth-oldest in the country. Since its founding, its graduates have included several notable attorneys, judges, government and corporate leaders, and legal educators. Dickinson School of Law's 1997 merger with Penn State was completed in 2000. It expanded its reputation, network, and joint degree programs complementing Dickinson Law's legacy as an innovative leader in experiential education. In 2006, a second law campus was opened at University Park. In 2014, the law school was split into two separately accredited law schools: Dickinson Law in Carlisle and Penn State Law in University Park. The last students to attend the dual-campus Penn State Dickinson School of Law graduated in May 2017.
- Penn State Great Valley in Malvern, is a special mission campus offering master's degrees, graduate certification, and continuing professional education. It also offers classes at the Philadelphia Naval Shipyard.
- Penn State University College of Medicine in Hershey, is the university's medical school and teaching hospital. Penn State Milton S. Hershey Medical Center became the ninth hospital in the United States and 16th worldwide to implant the CardioWest temporary Total Artificial Heart when a 60-year-old man suffering from end-stage heart failure received the device in May 2008.
- Pennsylvania College of Technology, in Williamsport, which became an affiliate of the university in 1989, offers degrees and certificates in over ten technical fields.

==== World Campus ====
In 1998, the university launched Penn State World Campus, or Penn State Online, which offers more than 60 online education programs, degrees, and certificates. Distance education has a long history at Penn State, one of the first universities in the country to offer a correspondence course for remote farmers in 1892. Examples of online programs include an MBA, a master of professional studies in homeland security, a Bachelor of Science in nursing, and post-baccalaureate certificates in geographic information systems and applied behavior analysis.

== Organization and administration ==
Penn State is a state-related university and a member of Pennsylvania's Commonwealth System of Higher Education. While it receives funding from the Commonwealth and is connected to the state through its board of trustees, it is otherwise independent and not subject to any direct control by the state. For the 2006–2007 fiscal year, the university received 9.7 percent of its budget from state appropriations, the lowest of the four state-related institutions in Pennsylvania.

=== Colleges ===
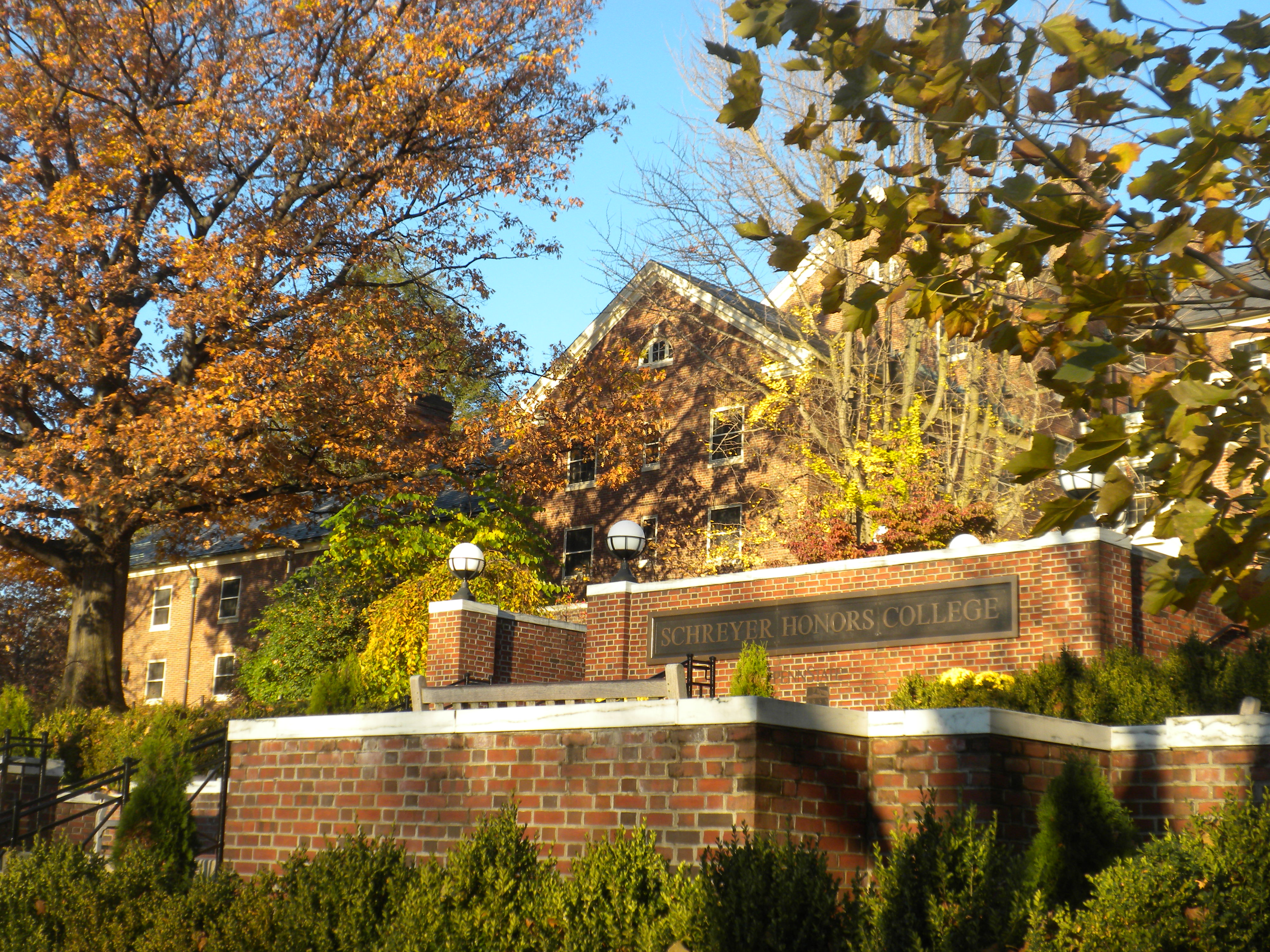
Schreyer Honors College in May 2014

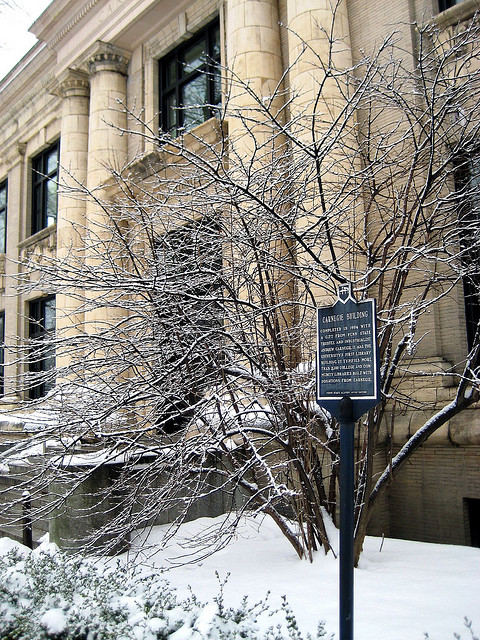
The Carnegie Building in February 2008

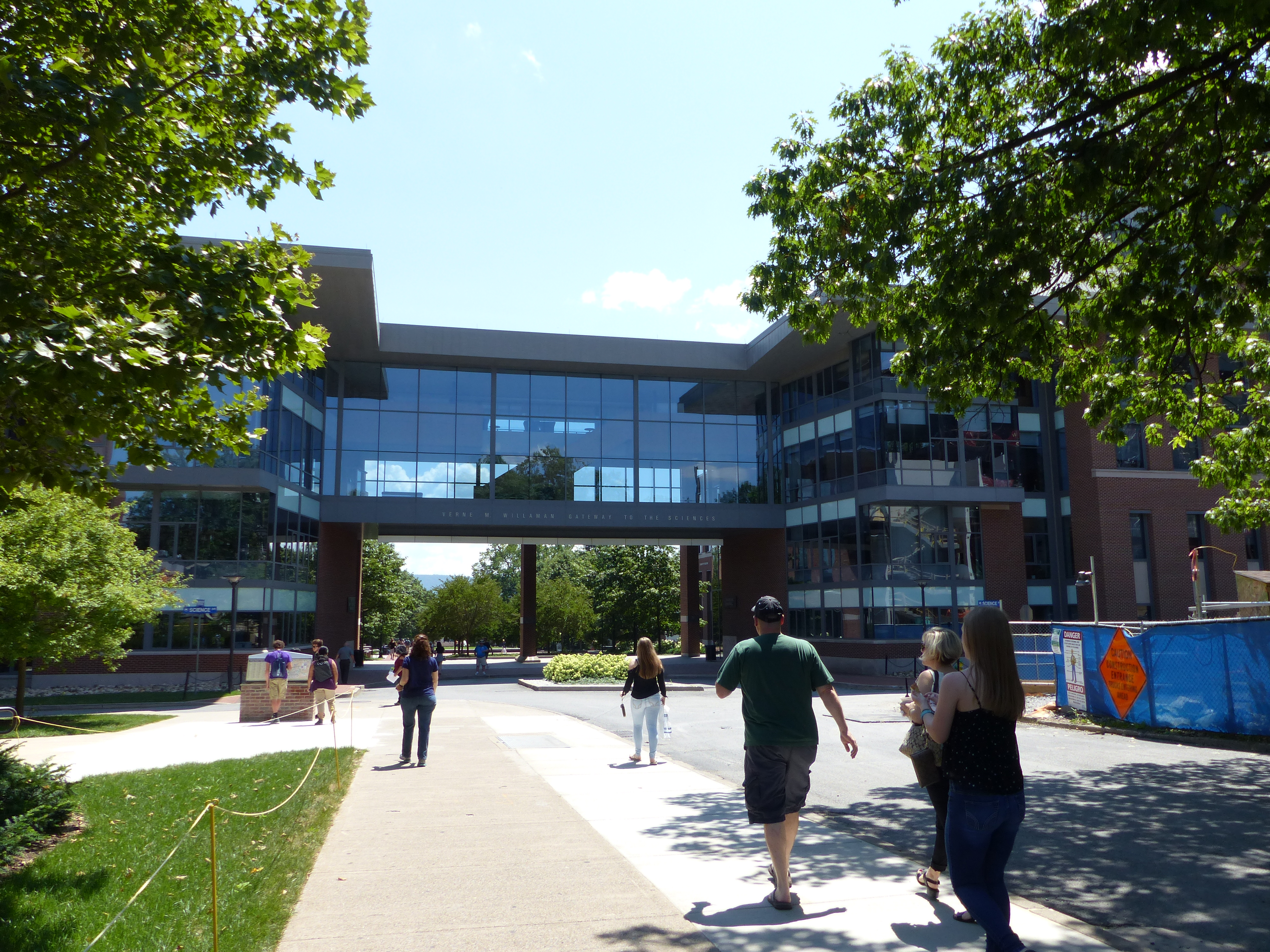
Huck Institute of the Life Sciences: Gateway to the Sciences in July 2017

Penn State has eighteen colleges, including three at special-mission campuses. The University Park campus is organized into fourteen distinct colleges, plus the graduate school and the division of undergraduate studies:

- College of Agricultural Sciences
- College of Arts and Architecture
- College of Business
- College of Communications
- College of Science
- College of Technology
- College of the Liberal Arts
- College of Medicine
- College of Earth and Mineral Sciences
- College of Education
- College of Engineering
- College of Health and Human Development
- College of Information Sciences and Technology
- Dickinson Law
- Graduate School
- Honors College
- Ross and Carol Nese College of Nursing
- School of International Affairs

The university's board of trustees voted in January 2007 to create a school of international affairs, with the first classes admitted in the fall 2008 semester. The school is part of Penn State Law.

Formerly the school of nursing, on September 25, 2013, the board of trustees granted the nursing program college status.

=== Board of trustees ===
The 32-member board of trustees governs the university. Its members include the university's president, the Governor of the Commonwealth, and the state Secretaries of Agriculture, Conservation and Natural Resources, and Education. The other members include six trustees appointed by the Governor, nine elected by alumni, and six elected by Pennsylvania agricultural societies. Six additional trustees are elected by a board representing business and industry enterprises. Undergraduate students do not elect any trustees; the court case Benner v. Oswald ruled that the Equal Protection Clause of the Fourteenth Amendment did not require the undergraduate students be allowed to participate in the selection of trustees.

As of 2026, the chair of the board of trustees is David M. Kleppinger, a graduate of Penn State and chairman emeritus at McNees Wallace & Nurick LLC.

The board's main responsibilities are to select the president of Penn State, determine the goals and strategic direction of the university, and approve the annual budget. Regular meetings of the board are held bi-monthly and take place primarily on the University Park campus, although on occasion meetings are held at other locations within the Commonwealth.

=== Administration ===
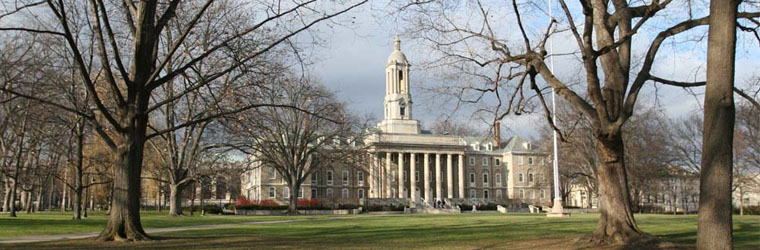
Old Main, the university's main administrative building on its main campus, in May 2014

The university president is selected by the board and is given the authority for actual control of the university, including day-to-day management. In practice, part of this responsibility is delegated by the president to other administrative departments, the faculty, and the student body. Neeli Bendapudi became the university's 19th and current president on May 9, 2022, upon the departure of Eric J. Barron. The executive vice president and provost is the chief academic officer of the university. The current provost, Fotis Sotiropoulos, assumed the office on August 11, 2025.

=== Student government ===
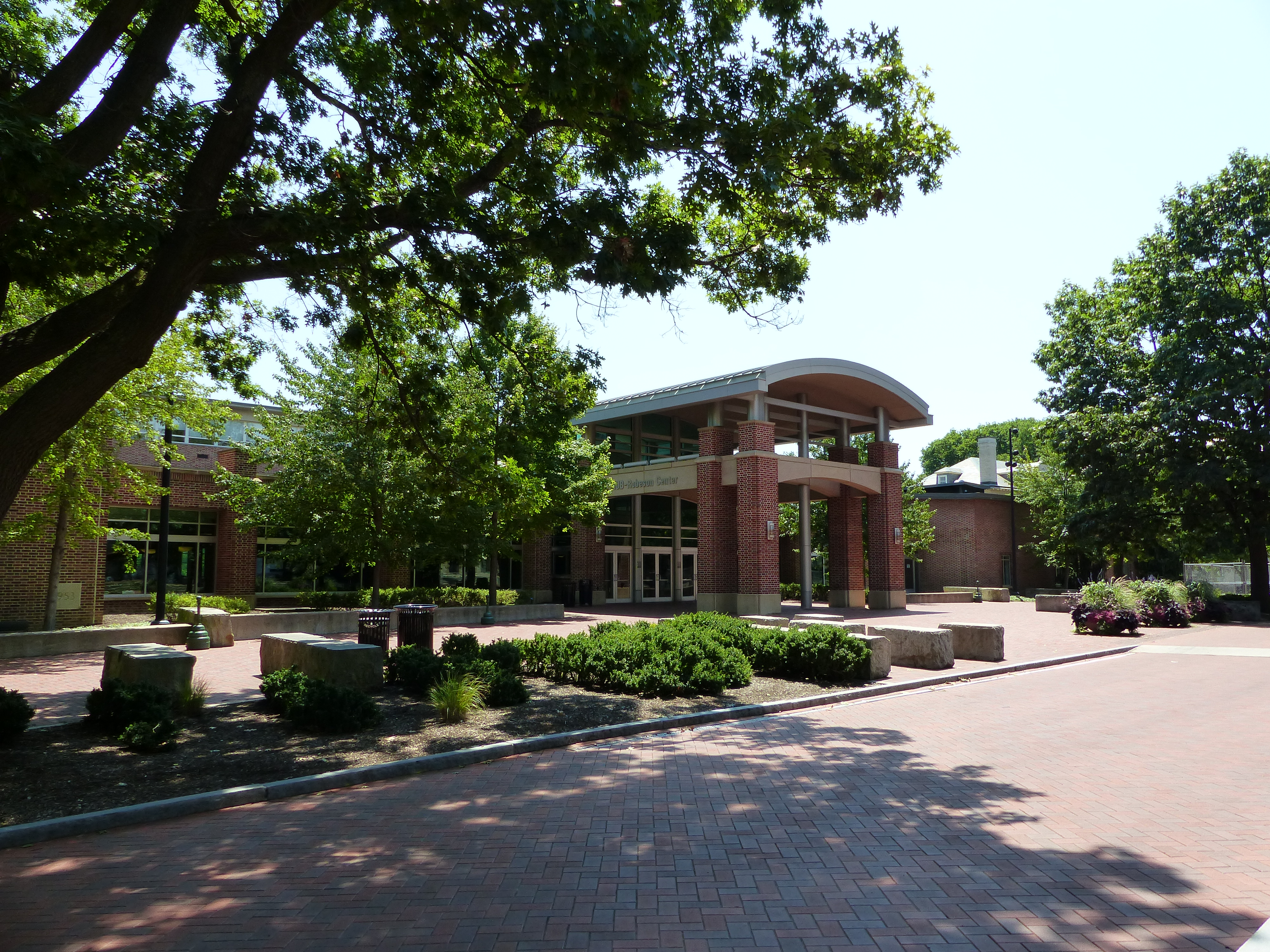
HUB-Robeson Center, Penn State's student union center on the main campus, in July 2017

Penn State has a long history of student governance. Elected student leaders remain directly involved in the decision-making of the university administration, as provided for in the board of trustees' standing orders. There are four student governments recognized by the university administration: the University Park Undergraduate Association (UPUA), the Graduate and Professional Student Association (GPSA), the Council of Commonwealth Student Governments (CCSG), and the World Campus Student Government Association (WCSGA).

The University Park Undergraduate Association (UPUA) is the representative student government of the undergraduate students at Penn State's University Park campus, which was established in 2006 after the former student government, Undergraduate Student Government (USG), lost its recognition by way of a student referendum. Graduate and professional students at the university are represented by the Graduate and Professional Student Association (GPSA), the oldest continuously existing student governance organization at Penn State.

The 19 Commonwealth Campuses of the university are governed by the Council of Commonwealth Student Governments (CCSG), formerly known as the Council of Branch Campus Student Governments (CBCSG).

In 2019, the World Campus Student Government Association (WCSGA) was formed to advocate for the interests and concerns of the more than 20,000 Penn State World Campus students.

== Academics ==
=== Undergraduate admissions ===
Undergraduate admissions statistics
- 2023 entering class
- Admit rate: 54.2% (▼ −2.3)
- Yield rate: 19.4% (▼ −7.7)

Test scores middle 50%^{[i]}
- SAT Total: 1230–1390 (among 33% of FTFs)
- ACT Composite: 27–32 (among 6% of FTFs)

High school GPA
- Average: 3.67

Admission to Penn State University Park is classified as "selective" by the Carnegie Classification of Institutions of Higher Education. The Princeton Review gives Penn State University Park an "Admissions Selectivity Rating" of 90 out of 99.

In 2023, the university received 85,957 applications. It extended offers of admission to 46,605 applicants, or 54%, after holistic review that includes examination of academic rigor, performance and admissions test scores. 9,040 accepted students chose to enroll, a yield rate of 14%.

The university started test-optional admissions with the fall 2021 incoming class. Of the 33% of incoming students in 2023 who submitted SAT scores, the interquartile range was 1230–1390; of the 6% of incoming students in 2023 who submitted ACT scores, the interquartile range was 27–32. Of all matriculating students, the average high school GPA was 3.67.

Penn State's freshman retention rate is 92%, with 85% going on to graduate within six years.

Pennsylvania State University Park is a college-sponsor of the National Merit Scholarship Program and sponsored five Merit Scholarship awards in 2020. In the 2020–2021 academic year, 16 incoming freshman students were National Merit Scholars.

Fall First-Time Freshman Statistics
	2021	2020	2019	2018	2017
Applicants	78,578	73,861	71,903	52,742	56,114
Admits	45,269	40,031	35,302	29,793	28,233
Admit rate	57.6	54.2	49.1	56.5	50.3
Enrolled	8,614	8,465	8,331	8,075	7,863
Yield rate	19.0	21.1	23.6	27.1	27.9
ACT composite* (out of 36)	26-32 (8%^{†})	25-30 (18%^{†})	25-30 (17%^{†})	25-30 (22%^{†})	25-30 (30%^{†})
SAT composite* (out of 1600)	1200-1400 (37%^{†})	1150-1340 (77%^{†})	1160-1370 (78%^{†})	1160-1360 (74%^{†})	1160-1340 (65%^{†})
* middle 50% range^{†} percentage of first-time freshmen who chose to submit

=== Academic divisions ===
Penn State is accredited by the Middle States Commission on Higher Education. The Smeal College of Business, The Sam and Irene Black School of Business, Penn State Harrisburg, and Penn State Great Valley are accredited by the Association to Advance Collegiate Schools of Business (AACSB).

The university offers an accelerated Premedical-Medical Program in cooperation with Sidney Kimmel Medical College. Students in the program spend two or three years at the university before attending medical school at Jefferson.

=== Rankings ===
Academic rankings

National
- Forbes: 338
- U.S. News & World Report: 55
- Washington Monthly: 795
- WSJ/College Pulse: 431

Global
- ARWU: 101–150
- QS: 92 (tie)
- THE: 108
- U.S. News & World Report: 91 (tie)

Undergraduate National Rankings
Program	Ranking
Engineering	22
Biological/Agricultural Engineering	10
Industrial/Manufacturing Engineering	11
Materials Science	11
Mechanical Engineering	12
Petroleum Engineering	4
Business	24
Finance	37
Management	34
Marketing	32
Production/Operation Management	13
Supply Chain Management/Logistics	7

Graduate National Rankings
Program	Ranking		
Accounting	40		
Business Analytics	39		
Finance	43		
Management	25		
Production/Operation Management	13		
Supply Chain Management/Logistics	7	Biological Sciences	46
Chemistry	20		
Clinical Psychology	10		
Computer Science	30		
Criminology	5		
Earth Sciences	5		
Economics	25		
Education	36		
Engineering	31		
English	27		
Fine Arts	64		
Health Care Management	23		
History	44		
Law	60 (University Park); 62 (Dickinson)		
Mathematics	32		
Medicine: Primary Care	Unranked (Hershey)		
Medicine: Research	Unranked (Hershey)		
Nursing: Master's	30		
Nursing: Doctor of Nursing Practice	Unranked		
Physics	25		
Political Science	33		
Psychology	26		
Public Affairs	90		
Public Health	56 (Hershey)		
Rehabilitation Counseling	4		
Sociology	17		
Speech-Language Pathology	25		
Statistics	20		

Global Program Rankings
Program	Ranking
Agricultural Sciences	50
Art and Humanities	26
Biology and Biochemistry	98
Biotechnology and Applied Microbiology	88
Cardiac and Cardiovascular Systems	201
Cell Biology	163
Chemical Engineering	81
Chemistry	65
Civil Engineering	75
Clinical Medicine	178
Computer Science	62
Economics and Business	32
Electrical and Electronic Engineering	232
Endocrinology and Metabolism	169
Energy and Fuels	83
Engineering	74
Environment/Ecology	83
Geosciences	34
Immunology	130
Materials Science	29
Mathematics	32
Mechanical Engineering	66
Microbiology	64
Molecular Biology and Genetics	77
Nanoscience and Nanotechnology	58
Oncology	232
Pharmacology and Toxicology	231
Physics	89
Plant and Animal Science	18
Psychiatry/Psychology	59
Public, Environmental, and Occupational Health	129
Radiology, Nuclear Medicine, and Medical Imaging	197
Social Sciences and Public Health	35
Space Sciences	31
Surgery	183

The Academic Ranking of World Universities ranked Penn State between 101st and 150th among universities globally and between 42nd and 56th nationally for 2020. U.S. News & World Report ranked the university tied for 55th among national universities and 22nd among national public schools in the United States for 2027. In their national rankings for 2026, The Wall Street Journal ranked Penn State 431st and Washington Monthly ranked Penn State at 795th.

The university was ranked 92nd in the 2027 edition of the QS World University Rankings. The 2021 "World University Rankings" by Times Higher Education ranked the university as the 114th best university in the world. The 2021 Global University Ranking by CWTS Leiden Ranking ranked the university as 52nd-best university in the world and 18th in the U.S.

=== Research ===
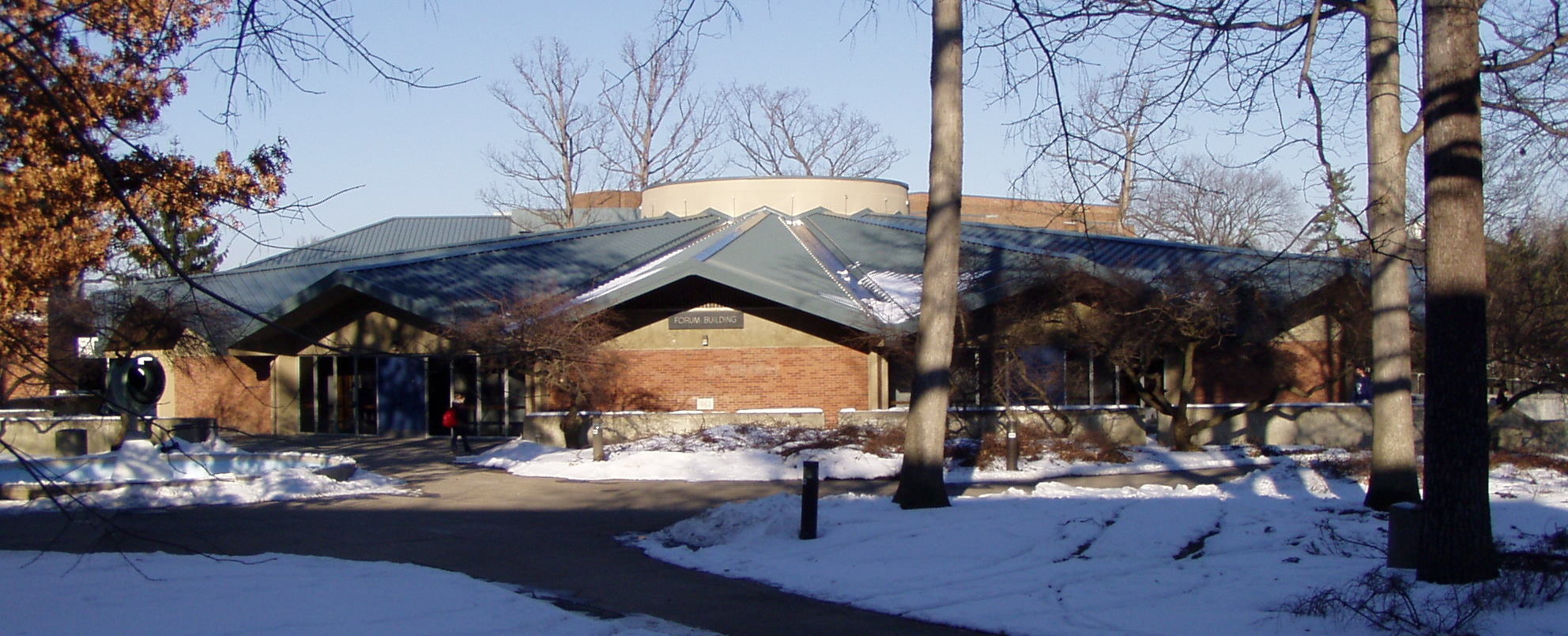
The Forum Building, a classroom building with four classrooms, each capable of containing over 300 students, in February 2005

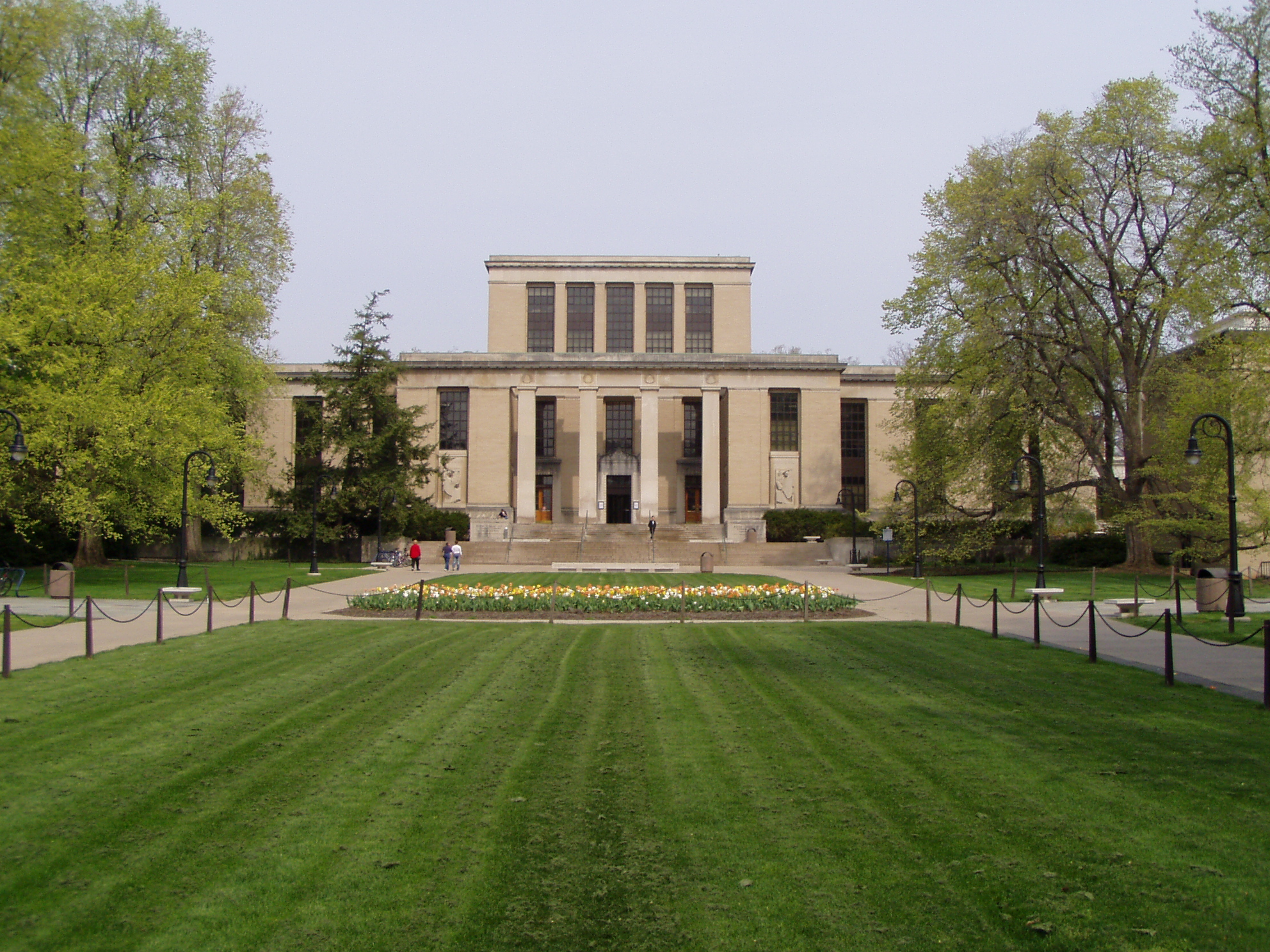
Pattee Library in May 2005

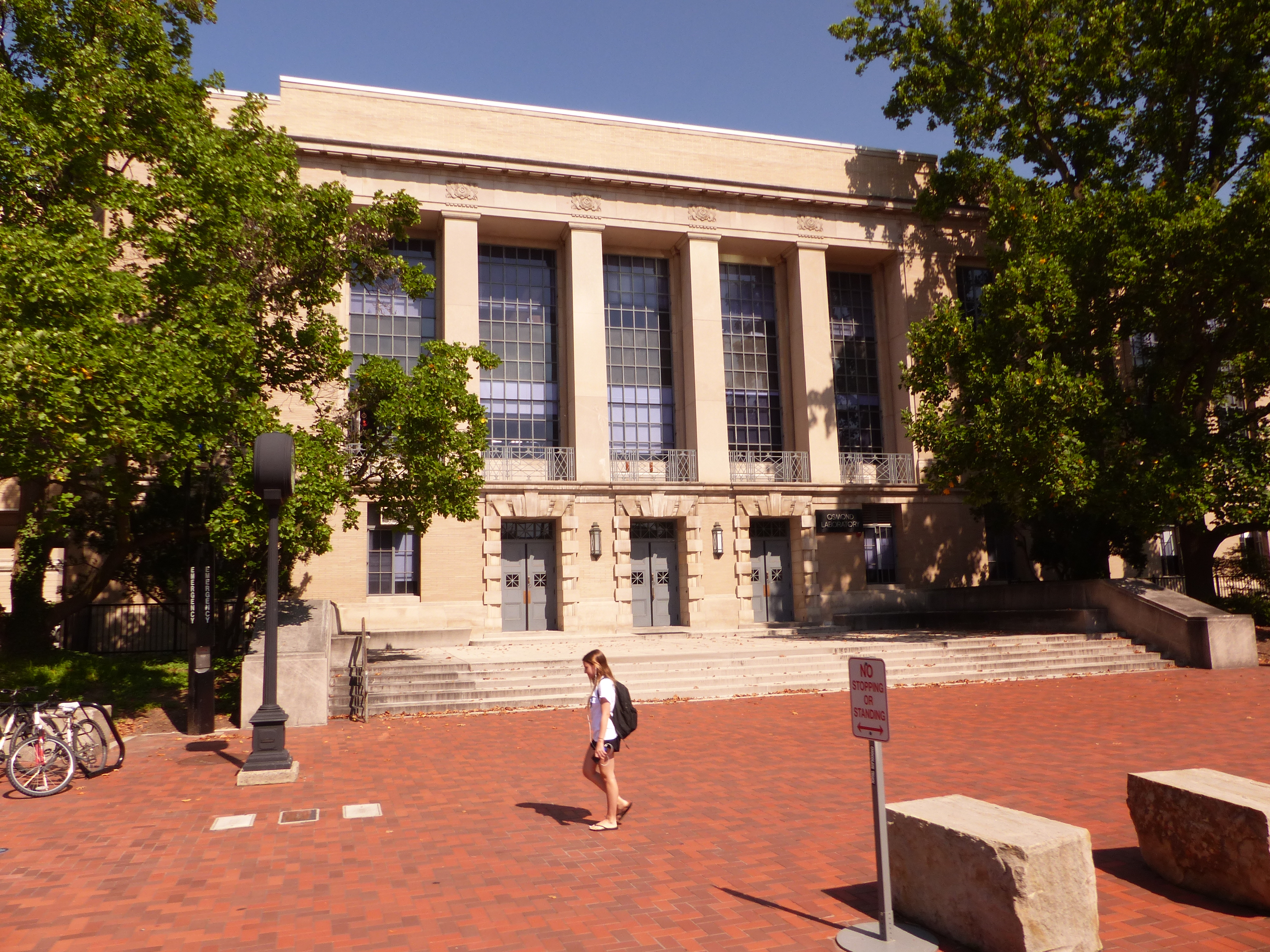
Osmond Laboratory in July 2017

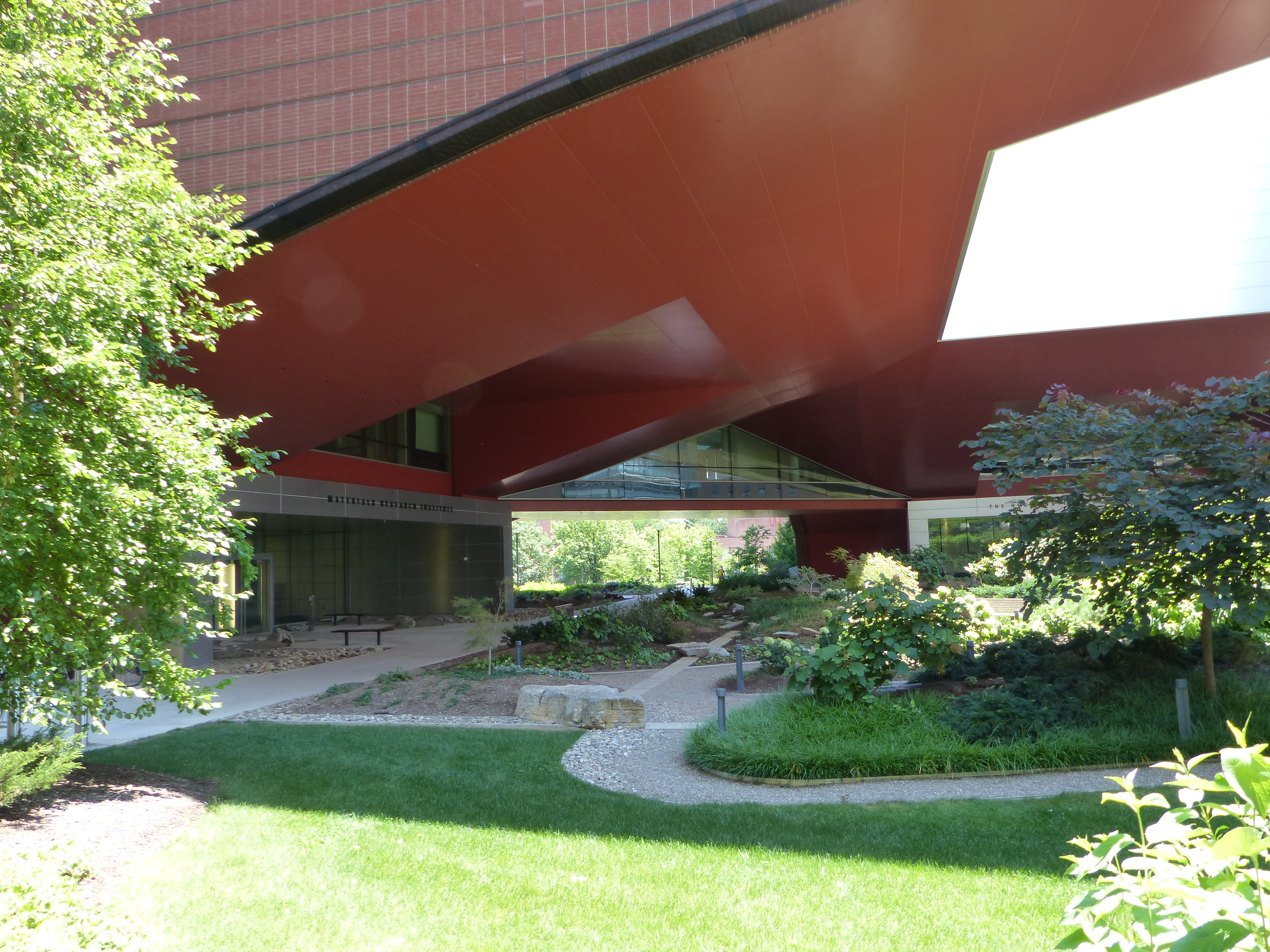
Millennium Science Complex in July 2017

Penn State is classified among "R1: Doctoral Universities – Very high research activity". Over 10,000 students are enrolled in the university's graduate school (including the law and medical schools), and over 70,000 degrees have been awarded since the school was founded in 1922.

According to the National Science Foundation, Penn State spent $971 million on research and development in 2021, ranking it 26th in the nation.

The Applied Research Lab (ARL), located near the University Park campus, has been a research partner with the United States Department of Defense since 1945 and conducts research primarily in support of the United States Navy. It is the largest component of Penn State's research efforts statewide, with over 1,000 researchers and other staff members.

The university was one of the founding members of the Worldwide Universities Network (WUN), a partnership that includes 17 research-led universities in the United States, Asia, and Europe. The network provides funding, facilitates collaboration between universities, and coordinates exchanges of faculty members and graduate students among institutions. Former Penn State president Graham Spanier is a former vice-chair of the WUN.

Pennsylvania State University Libraries were ranked 14th among research libraries in North America in the 2003–2004 survey released by The Chronicle of Higher Education. The university's library system began with a 1,500-book two-room library in Old Main, but moved to its own space – Carnegie Library (named after college trustee Andrew Carnegie) – ten years later. In 2009, its holdings had grown to 5.2 million volumes, in addition to 500,000 maps, five million microforms, and 180,000 films and videos. The university is a member of the Center for Research Libraries.

The university's College of Information Sciences and Technology is the home of CiteSeerX, an open-access repository and search engine for scholarly publications. The university is also the host to the Radiation Science & Engineering Center, which houses the oldest operating university research reactor. Additionally, University Park houses the Graduate Program in Acoustics, the only freestanding acoustics program in the United States. The university also houses the Center for Medieval Studies, a program that was founded to research and study the European Middle Ages, and the Center for the Study of Higher Education (CSHE), one of the first centers established to research postsecondary education. It is a member of the CDIO Initiative, an international network of universities working to develop unique teaching methods in engineering. The university is also a member of the University Corporation for Atmospheric Research, an organization of hundreds of leading universities dedicated to researching atmosphere and climatology.

== Student life ==
=== Student demographics ===
Undergraduate demographics as of Fall 2023
Race and ethnicity	Total
White	60%
International student	11%
Hispanic/Latino	10%
Asian	8%
Black/African American	6%
Two or more races	4%
Unknown	3%

As of fall 2010, the racial makeup of the Penn State system including all campuses and special-mission colleges, was 75.4 percent white, 5.5 percent black, 4.3 percent Asian, 4.4 percent Hispanic, 0.2 percent Native American, 0.1 percent Native Hawaiian/Pacific Islander, 1.7 percent two or more races, 5.8 percent international students and 3.1 percent of an unknown race. Over the period 2000–2010, minority enrollment as a percentage of total enrollments has risen 5.3 percentage points, while minorities as a percentage of total teaching positions rose 2.0 percentage points from 1997 to 2002.

Penn State has been the subject of controversy for several issues of discrimination. Following some violent attacks on African-Americans in downtown State College in 1988 and complaints that Penn State was not adequately recruiting African-American faculty and students to representative population levels, student activists occupied Old Main. They demanded that Penn State do more to recruit minority students and address intolerance toward minority students on campus and the local community. After President Bryce Jordan canceled a promised meeting with students and organizations in the Paul Robeson Cultural Center on April 8, 1988, 250 students and activists nonviolently occupied Penn State's Telecommunications building on campus. The following morning, 50 state troopers and 45 local and campus police, equipped with helmets, batons, and rubber gloves, entered the building as the crowd outside sang "We Shall Overcome", arresting 89 individuals for trespassing. All charges were later dismissed.

In 1990, a vice provost for educational equity was appointed to lead a five-year strategic plan to "create an environment characterized by equal access and respected participation for all groups and individuals irrespective of cultural differences." Since then, discrimination issues include the handling of death threats in 1992 and 2001, controversy around LGBT issues, and the investigation of a 2006 sexual discrimination lawsuit filed by former Lady Lions basketball player Jennifer Harris, alleging that head coach Rene Portland dismissed her from the team in part due to her perceived sexual orientation.

=== Housing ===
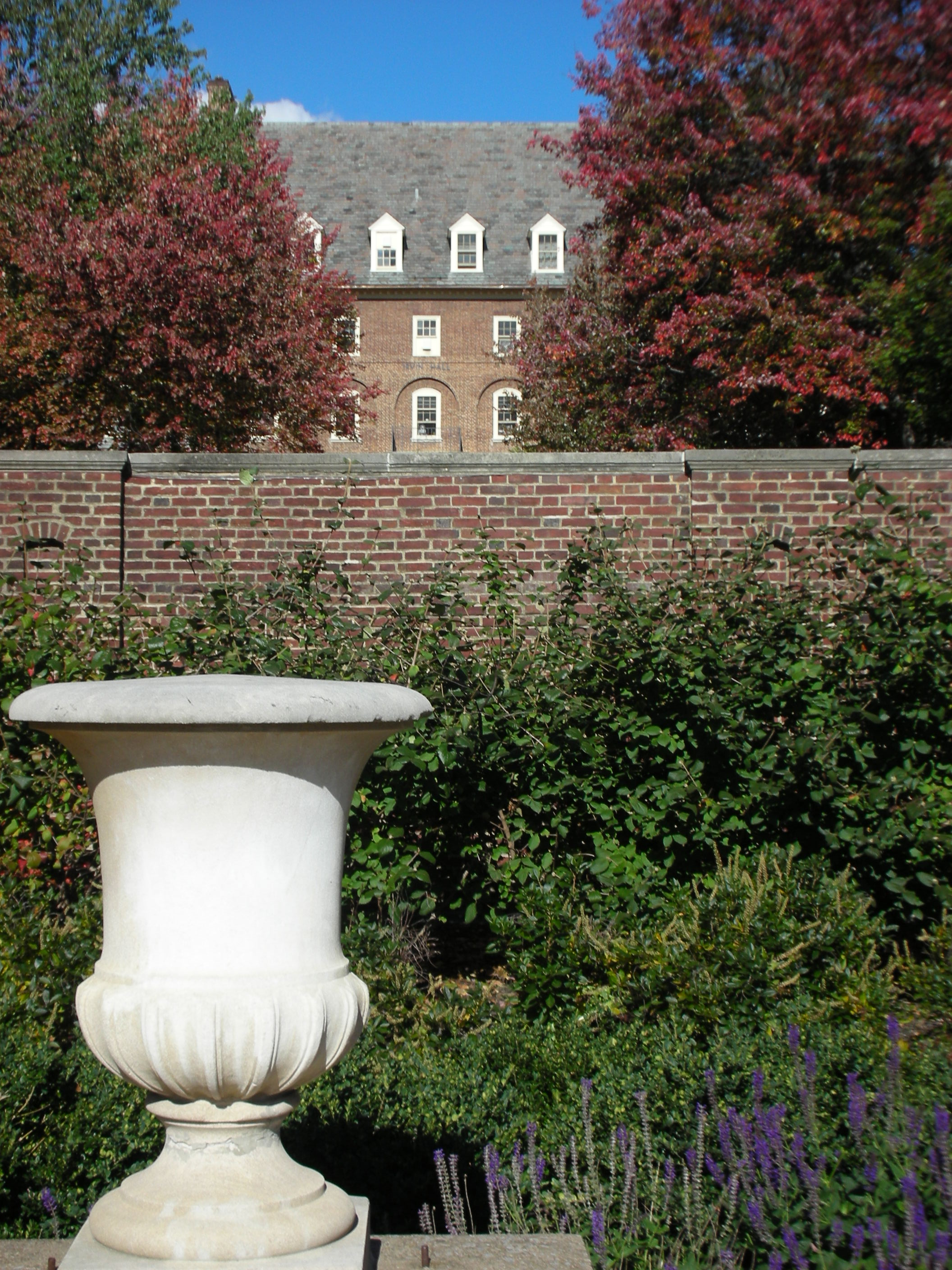
Irvin Residence Hall in West Halls in October 2006

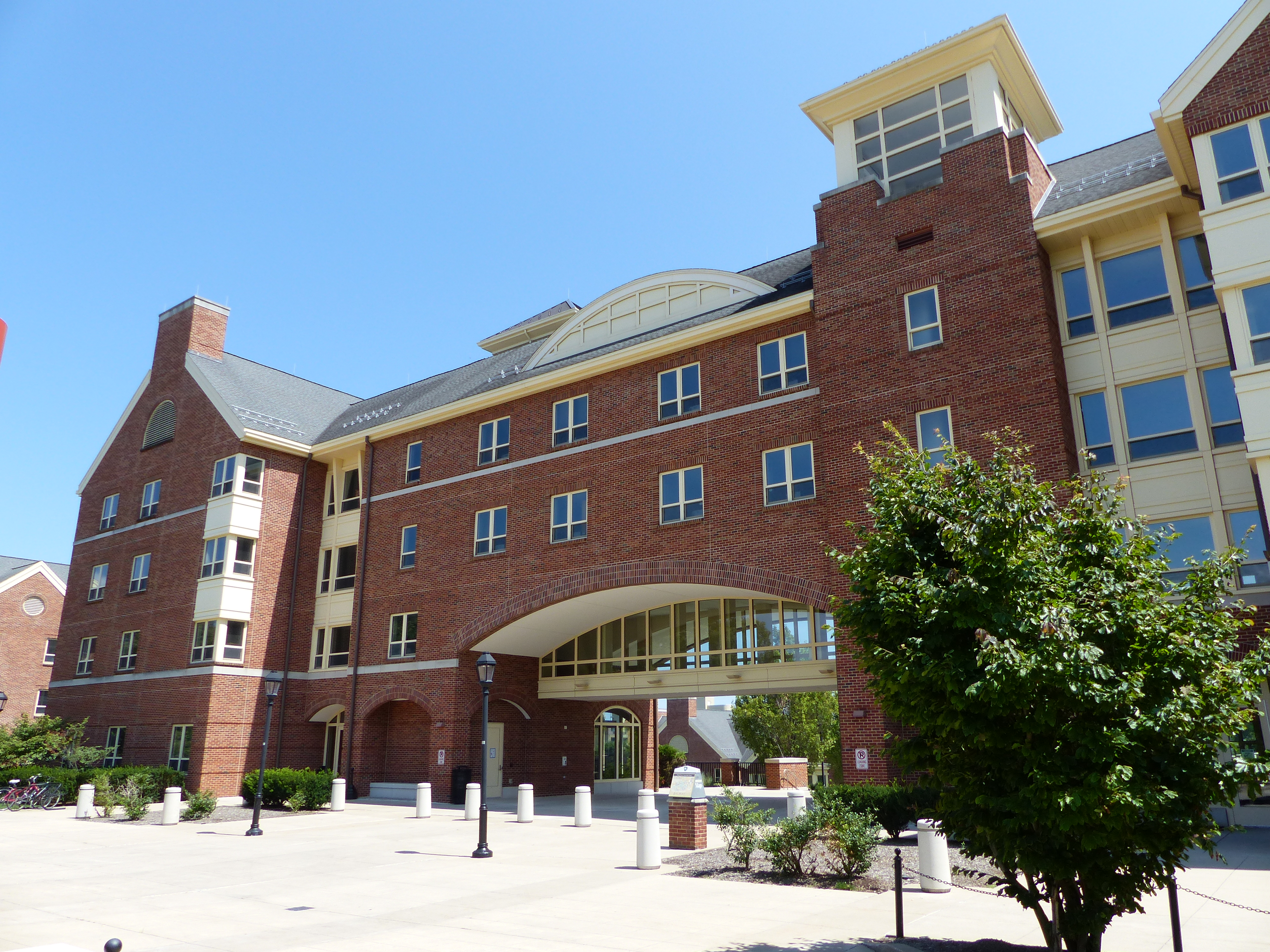
Brill Hall in July 2017

There are seven housing complexes on campus for students attending the University Park campus: East Halls, North Halls, Pollock Halls, South Halls, West Halls, Eastview Terrace, and Nittany Apartments. Each complex consists of a few separate buildings that are dormitories and a commons building, which has: lounges, the help desk for the complex, mailboxes for each dormitory room, a convenience store, a food court, an all-you-care-to-eat buffet. Different floors within a building may be designated as a Living Learning Community (LLC). LLCs are offered to members of certain student groups, such as sororities, students studying particular majors, students who wish to engage in a particular lifestyle (such as the alcohol-free LIFE House), or other groups who wish to pursue similar goals.

=== Student organizations ===
As of September 2014, 864 student organizations were recognized at the University Park campus. In addition, the university has one of the largest Greek systems in the country, with approximately 12 percent of the University Park population affiliated. Additional organizations on campus include Thespians, Blue Band, Chabad, Glee Club, Aish HaTorah, Student Programming Association (SPA), Lion's Pantry, Boulevard, Apollo, 3D Printer Club, Digi Digits, and the Anime Organization, which hosts an annual Central Pennsylvania-based anime convention, Setsucon.

==== THON ====
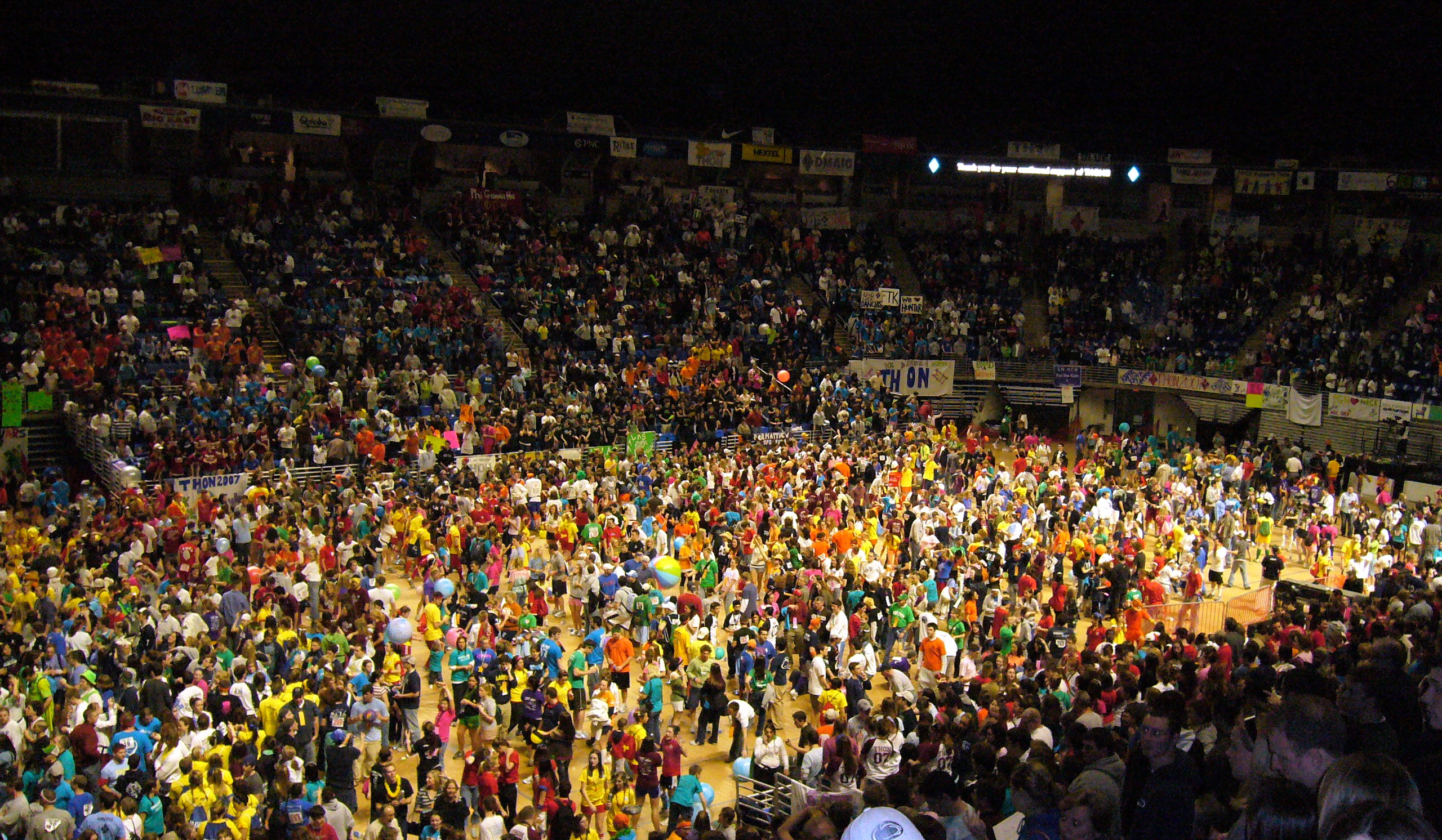
The Penn State IFC/Panhellenic Dance Marathon in February 2007

Annually in February, thousands of students participate in the Penn State IFC/Panhellenic Dance Marathon (THON). Started in 1973 with 78 participants, THON has grown to become the largest student-run philanthropy in the world. Every year, participants stand for 46 hours nonstop and perform a line dance at least once every hour to stay alert alongside other events hosted throughout the weekend such as concerts, games, athlete hour, family hour, and a tribute to all of the children with cancer. In 2007, THON was moved to the Bryce Jordan Center and shortened from 48 to 46 hours, due to potential conflicts with basketball games. THON raises millions of dollars annually for childhood cancer care and research for its sole beneficiary, Four Diamonds. In 2025, THON raised a program record of $17.7 million.

==== The Lion's Pantry ====
The Lion's Pantry is an undergraduate student-run on-campus food pantry and registered student organization. The Lion's Pantry serves undergraduate, graduate, and professional students. With increasing awareness of hunger on college campuses, the Lion's Pantry is one of the nation's most successful startup food pantries. They partner with groups ranging from Boulevard, UPUA, Greek Life, and more to receive over 8,000 food donations a year. The club was also awarded the Class Gift of 2017 in the form of an endowment.

=== Public safety ===
Twenty-two of Penn State's campuses are served by Penn State University Police and Public Safety. In addition to being a full-service police department, the department also has specialized units such as K9, criminal investigation, bike patrol, a bomb squad, and drones. The police department was founded in 1926 as Campus Patrol.

Penn State University Park is also served by the Penn State University Ambulance Service, known as Centre County Company 20. Penn State EMS is a full-service, licensed ambulance service, staffed by student EMTs. The ambulance is staffed around the clock, with the exception of the school's annual winter break, when it goes out of service. The ambulance is affiliated with the University Health Service.

=== Student media ===
Student media groups on campus include: The Daily Collegian, Penn State's student-run newspaper; Onward State, a student-run blog; The Underground, a multi-cultural student media site; The LION 90.7 FM (WKPS-FM), a student-run radio station; CommRadio, a student-run, internet-based radio program; La Vie, the university's annual student yearbook; Kalliope, a student-produced literary journal; Valley, a student-run style and life magazine; and, Phroth, a student-run humor magazine; and Penn State Live, the official news source of the university published by its public relations team.

The Daily Collegian, founded in 1904, provides news, sports, and arts coverage and produces long-form features. It publishes in print on Mondays and Thursdays while classes are in session. Since the summer of 1996, the traditional paper publication has been supplemented by an online edition. Online content is published every day. Penn State's Commonwealth Campuses receive a weekly copy of the paper titled The Weekly Collegian.

Onward State is a student-run blog geared towards the university's community members. The blog, which was founded in 2008, provides news, event coverage, and opinion pieces. U.S. News & World Report named the blog the "Best Alternative Media Outlet" in February 2009.

The LION 90.7 FM (WKPS-FM) was founded in 1995 as a replacement for Penn State's original student radio station WDFM. The LION broadcasts from the ground floor of the HUB-Robeson Center, serving the Penn State and State College communities with alternative music and talk programming, including live coverage of home Penn State football games.

La Vie (the Life), the university's annual student yearbook, has been published continuously since 1890. La Vie 1987, edited by David Beagin, won a College Gold Crown for Yearbooks award from the Columbia Scholastic Press Association.

Kalliope is an undergraduate literary journal produced by students and sponsored by the university's English Department. It is published in the spring. Kalliope includes works of fiction, nonfiction, poetry, and visual art. In addition, Klio, an online publication, provides students with literary pieces in the fall semester.

Valley is Penn State's student-run life and style magazine. It was founded in 2007.

The student-run humor magazine, founded in 1909 as Froth, is Phroth, which publishes two to four issues each year. Notable Penn State alumni who worked at the magazine include Julius J. Epstein, who wrote the screenplay for Casablanca in 1942 and won three Academy Awards.

Penn State's newspaper readership program provides free copies of USA Today, The New York Times, and local and regional newspapers depending on the campus location. This program, initiated by then-President Graham Spanier in 1997, has since been instituted on several other universities across the country.

== Athletics ==
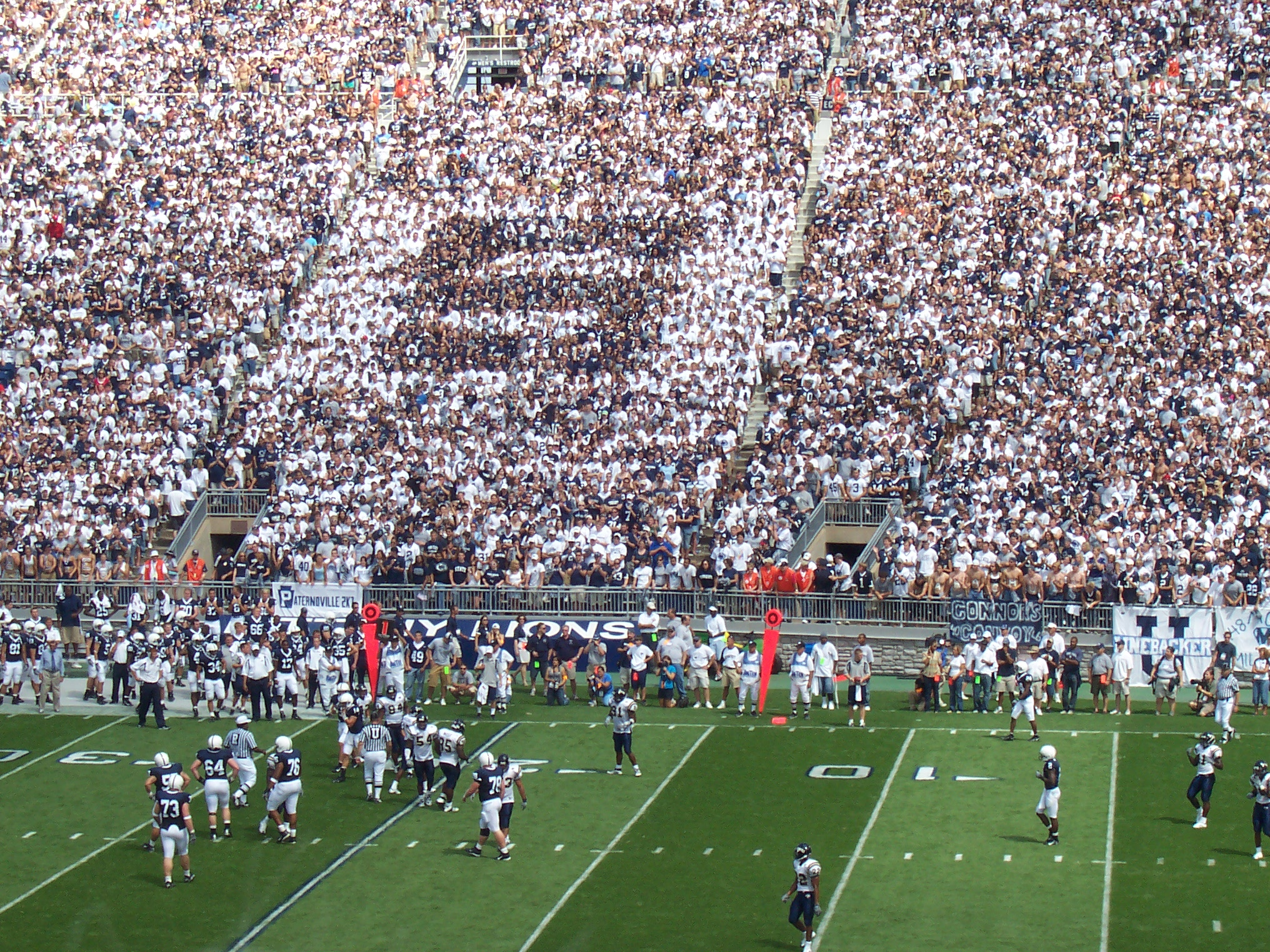
The "S-Zone," representing "State," in the student section at Beaver Stadium in February 2007

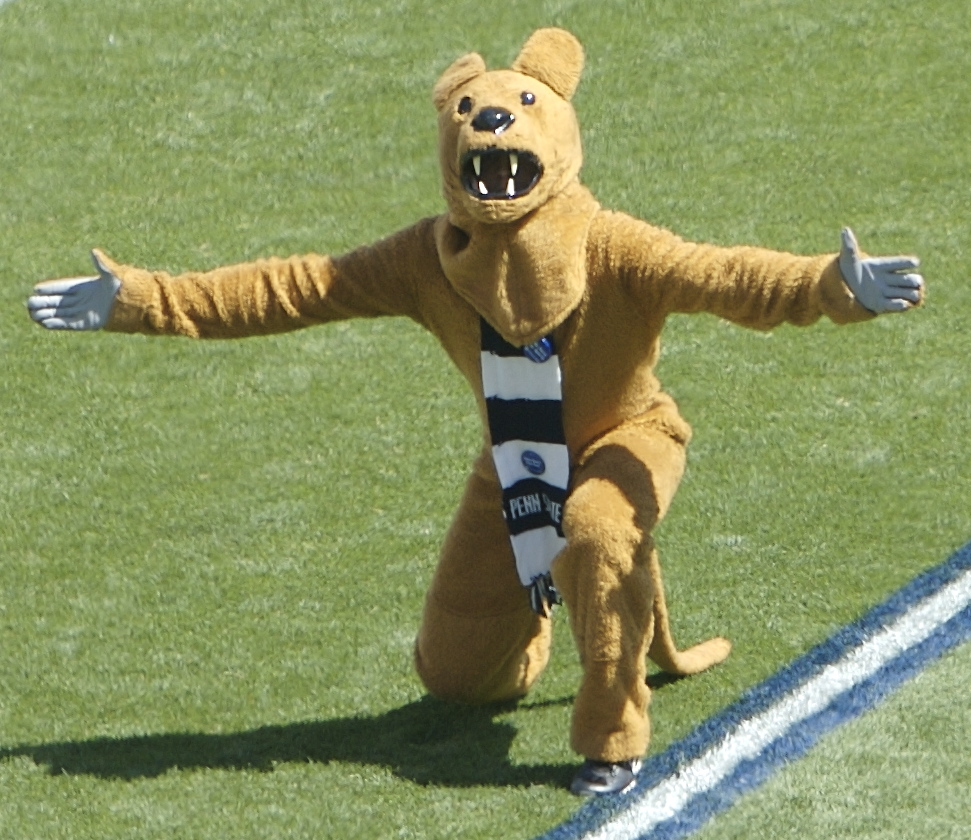
The Penn State Nittany Lions' mascot, the Nittany Lion, at Beaver Stadium, in September 2007

The Memorial Wall near Beaver Stadium, in February 2008

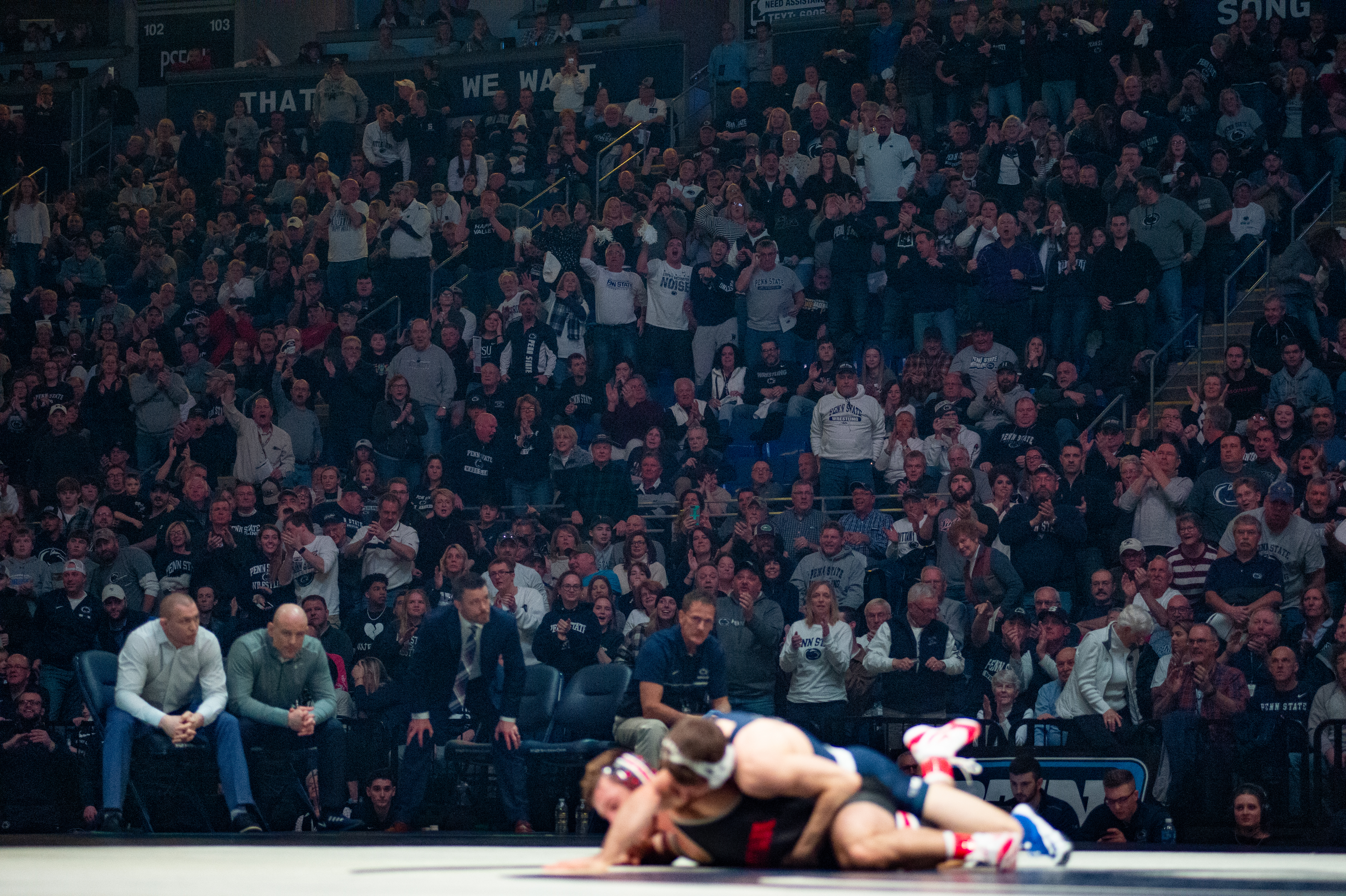
Penn State wrestling taking on Ohio State at the Bryce Jordan Center in February 2020. Since its 1909 founding, the Penn State wrestling team has won 13 team and 55 individual national championships.

Penn State's mascot is the Nittany Lion, a representation of a type of mountain lion that once roamed what is now University Park. The school's official colors, now blue and white, were originally black and dark pink. Originally introduced back when athletics were introduced at Penn State, this was changed in 1890 after the pink faded to white and to avoid ridicule from opposing teams. Pink and black still will make periodic appearances at athletic events in the modern era as a special student "S" section during certain games. Penn State participates in NCAA's Division I FBS for football and in the Big Ten Conference for most sports.

Two sports participate in different conferences: men's volleyball in the Eastern Intercollegiate Volleyball Association (EIVA) and women's hockey in College Hockey America (CHA). The fencing teams operate as independents.

Penn State athletic teams have claimed a total of 82 national collegiate team championships since the university's founding, including 54 NCAA, two consensus Division I football titles, six AIAW, three USWLA, one WIBC, four national titles in boxing, 11 in men's soccer, and one in wrestling in years prior to NCAA sponsorship. The university ranks fifth all-time in NCAA championships in NCAA Division I, and first among Big Ten schools.

Since joining the Big Ten in 1991, Penn State teams have won 124 conference regular season and tournament titles, through June, 2023.

Penn State has one of the most successful overall athletic programs in the country, evidenced by its rankings in the NACDA Director's Cup, a list compiled by the National Association of Collegiate Directors of Athletics that charts institutions' overall success in college sports. From the Cup's inception in the 1993–1994 season, the Nittany Lions have finished in the top 25 every year.

=== Football ===
With an official capacity of 106,572, Penn State's Beaver Stadium has the second-largest seating capacity after Michigan Stadium and the fourth-largest globally.

From 1966 to 2011, the Penn State football team was led by Coach Joe Paterno, who was in a close competition with Bobby Bowden, head coach for Florida State, for the most wins ever in Division I-A (now the FBS). Paterno still led in total wins at the time of Bowden's retirement following the 2010 Gator Bowl. In 2007, Paterno was inducted into the College Football Hall of Fame.

Paterno amassed 409 victories over his career, the most in NCAA Division I history. Paterno died on January 22, 2012, at the age of 85. Paterno was posthumously honored by Penn State during the September 17, 2016, football game that marked the 50th anniversary of his first game as head coach, although some criticized the ceremony as insensitive to the sex abuse victims of retired coach Jerry Sandusky.

The university opened a new Penn State All-Sports Museum in February 2002, which is a two-level 10,000-square-foot (1,000 m^{2}) museum located inside Beaver Stadium.

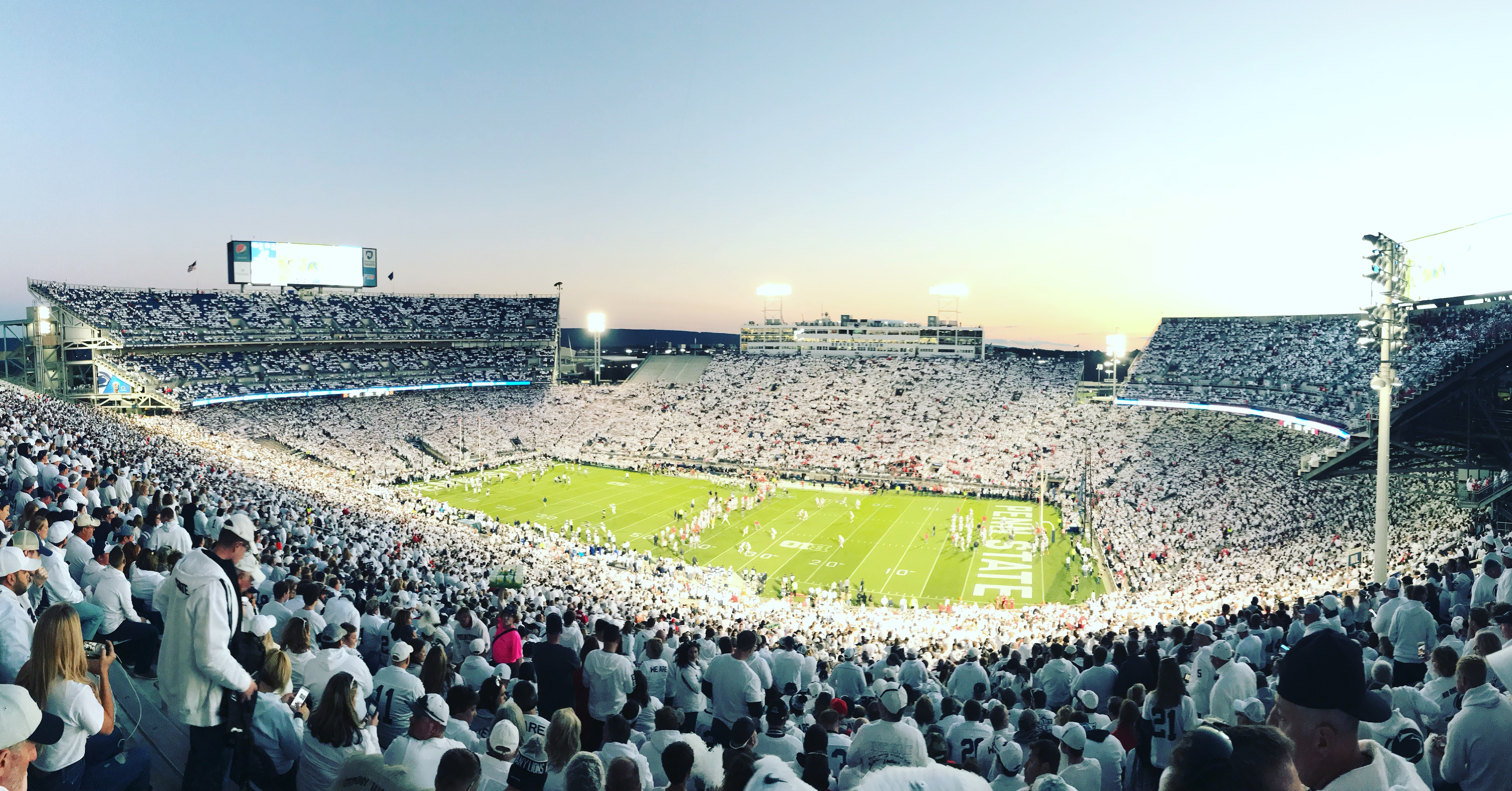
Beaver Stadium, the home field of Penn State Nittany Lions football, prior to a White Out game against Ohio State in September 2018, which drew 110,899 fans, the second-largest crowd in Beaver Stadium history

== Alumni association ==
The former President's House, now adjoined to the Hintz Family Alumni Center, in May 2007

The Penn State Alumni Association was established in 1870, nine years after the university's first commencement exercises. It supports educational and extracurricular missions of Penn State through financial support and is the network that connects alumni through over 280 "alumni groups", many of which are designated based on geographical, academic, or professional affiliation.

Membership totaled 176,426 as of 2016, making the Penn State Alumni Association the largest dues-paying alumni association in the world, a distinction it has held since 1995.

== See also ==
- Frost Entomological Museum
- List of colleges and universities in Pennsylvania
- List of Pennsylvania State University Olympians
- Palmer Museum of Art
