= WPSU (FM) =

- State College, Pennsylvania; United States
- Broadcast area: Happy Valley (Pennsylvania)
- Frequency: 91.5 MHz (HD Radio)
- Branding: 91.5 WPSU

Programming
- Format: news/talk; classical music
- Subchannels: HD2: WPSU 2 (public radio mix); HD3: Jazzworks (jazz)
- Affiliations: American Public Media; National Public Radio; Public Radio Exchange

Ownership
- Owner: Pennsylvania State University
- Sister stations: WPSU-TV

History
- First air date: December 6, 1953
- Former call signs: WDFM (1953–1984)
- Call sign meaning: "Pennsylvania State University"

Technical information
- Licensing authority: FCC
- Facility ID: 66239
- Class: B1
- ERP: 1,700 watts
- HAAT: 365 meters (1,198 ft)
- Transmitter coordinates: 40°55′11″N 77°58′28″W
- Translator: See § Translators
- Repeater: WPSX 90.1 FM (HD) (Kane, Pennsylvania)

Links
- Public license information: Public file; LMS
- Webcast: Listen live
- Website: radio.wpsu.org

WPSU (91.5 FM) is central Pennsylvania's only National Public Radio member radio station, licensed to the Pennsylvania State University Board of Trustees as a part of WPSU Penn State. The over-the-air and digital signal reaches 13 counties in central and north central Pennsylvania. WPSU is rebroadcast on WPSX 90.1 FM in Kane. Both the 91.5 and 90.1 signals transmit in HD.

Its production facilities are located along Innovation Park Boulevard outside State College.

With translators located throughout the region, WPSU-FM serves over 450,000 listeners in 13 central counties of the Commonwealth, 24 hours a day.

Through nationally and locally produced news, features and music programs from NPR, PRI and the station itself, WPSU-FM offers a variety of programming for a diverse listening audience.

== History ==
The station went on the air December 6, 1953, as WDFM. It was first conceived by the Class of 1951 and given to the University as a class gift. The primary goal of WDFM was to provide a hands-on learning experience for students interested in radio communications, but it also strove to serve the community with unique programming. A faculty member from the College of Communications served as a hands-on manager and full-time adviser. The radio station enjoyed quite a bit of popularity (and even controversy) in its early days, with certain DJs (including future faculty adviser Robert Zimmerman) opting to play cutting-edge artists such as Elvis Presley when doing so was not widely deemed acceptable. In the early days of WDFM the station was limited to jazz and classical music, but Zimmerman staged call-ins and requests to allow a wider variety of music to be featured. According to Lauren Deutsch, a Journalism major who served in various roles from 1965-1969, DJs were limited to play only jazz, folk, Broadway musicals, and Western early and classical music under an agreement with the commercial radio stations in State College and the region. Thus, no rock music was heard until around 1970. According to Scott Hower, a Radio TV major who was a DJ and the Chief Engineer from 1971-1974, rock was played in the evenings starting around 1970. A morning oldies format was aired from 6-10 starting around 1971. Rock music, plus the fact that WDFM was in stereo, was a thorn in the side of at least one of the State College commercial radio stations (which did not upgrade to stereo until around 1972). The DJs on that commercial station were forbidden from working at WDFM.

The station also presented live talk shows, including those with live and taped interviews of performing artists appearing on campus at the time. According to Deutsch, who served as assistant director of News as well as who anchored a Broadway show tune and other cultural programs, the news was gathered from the AP wire machine at the station. (On occasion the national / international news would be missing from the wire, likely taken by someone with a current events project due, and the newscast would be limited to the agricultural report. This "problem" was not a great loss to the listeners studying in that area.

One of the challenges of any noncommercial station is to raise funds. During the mid-1960s, according to Deutsch, the WDFM staff would sell FM transistor radios for this purpose. This was a great idea inasmuch as this broadcast mode was relatively new technology.

On August 19, 1984, the station changed callsigns to WPSU, a year after the radio station at Penn State Wilkes-Barre, which had held them, was shuttered in 1983. WPSU became a part of Penn State Public Media under the university's Department of Continuing and Distance Education as opposed to being affiliated with the College of Communications, and is now a unit of Penn State Outreach.

Starting in the mid-1980s, as faculty involvement increased and student involvement decreased, WPSU began syndicating NPR shows to one of the few areas in the Eastern Time Zone where NPR hadn't previously been available. Such programming increased markedly from the late 1980s through the early 1990s. Finally, by 1992, WPSU was a full-fledged NPR member station.

WPSU-FM provides student internship experiences through reporting assignments and on-air hosting, as well as has many community volunteer on-air hosts.

In September 2025, the Penn State board of trustees committee voted unanimously against a proposal to transfer ownership of WPSU to WHYY-FM. This was reconsidered in October 2025, and the board approved the sale of WPSU to WHYY.

=== Podcasts ===
WPSU also has podcasts of the following programs:

- WPSU Morning News
- WPSU Weekly Features
- BookMark
- Penn State Forum
- Take Note Radio
- WPSU's Story Corps

== Relationship with WKPS ==
When it signed on in December 1953, WPSU was the student station for Penn State under the callsign WDFM. In the mid-1990s, a new station and signal was created—WKPS—that became the full-time student station. WKPS operates independently from WPSU. WPSU provides engineering and technical consultation, and development underwriting sales to support WKPS's efforts.

== Simulcast ==
Call sign	Frequency	City of license	Facility ID	ERP W	Height m (ft)	Class	Transmitter coordinates
WPSX	90.1 FM (HD)	Kane, Pennsylvania	66240	17,000	232 m (761 ft)	B	41°37′4″N 78°48′14″W

== Translators ==
Call sign	Frequency	City of license	FID	FCC info	Notes
W294AE	106.7 FM	Altoona, Pennsylvania	66241	LMS	Relays WPSU
W265BB	100.9 FM	Bradford, Pennsylvania	86704	LMS	Relays WPSX
W284AK	104.7 FM	Clearfield, Pennsylvania	86099	LMS	Relays WPSU
W221BD	92.1 FM	Dubois, Pennsylvania	85865	LMS	Relays WPSX
W273BE	102.5 FM	Huntingdon, Pennsylvania	157398	LMS	Relays WPSU

== See also ==
- WPSU-TV - a PBS TV station
- WKPS - The Lion 90.7FM - Penn State Student Radio
- WPSE - Penn State Erie's Money Station
