= WKPS =

Radio station owned by Penn State in University Park, Pennsylvania

- University Park, Pennsylvania; United States
- Broadcast area: State College, Pennsylvania
- Frequency: 90.7 MHz
- Branding: The LION 90.7fm

Programming
- Format: College radio

Ownership
- Owner: Pennsylvania State University

History
- First air date: October 31, 1995
- Call sign meaning: Penn State

Technical information
- Licensing authority: FCC
- Facility ID: 65471
- Class: A
- ERP: 100 watts
- HAAT: 14 meters (46 ft)
- Transmitter coordinates: 40°47′58.00″N 77°52′11.00″W

Links
- Public license information: Public file; LMS
- Website: thelion.fm

WKPS (90.7 FM, The LION 90.7fm) is a college radio station owned by Penn State University in University Park, Pennsylvania. The station runs on a full-time, multi-format schedule featuring a wide variety of programming.

LION 90.7fm transmits to a potential audience of over 125,000 from its studio in the Hetzel Union Building (HUB)-Robeson Center. The station also has a live webcast, which is capable of streaming live to hundreds of listeners. WKPS is licensed by the Federal Communications Commission (FCC) with the primary goal being to serve the campus and local community and secondary goals being the training, education and instruction of students in broadcast radio and station management. The station is run entirely by Penn State undergraduates, and maintains its tradition of public service by allowing student broadcasters from any academic major and community broadcasters local to the area. It also retains its programmatic independence by remaining unaffiliated with any academic college.

== History ==
=== WPSC ===
WPSC, Penn State's original student station, emerged from the Senior Gift of the Class of 1912. Initially an experimental shortwave installation, it represented "the first licensed club in the nation" and possessed "one of the first experimental licenses" granted by the government. By 1921, WPSC was broadcasting on the AM dial with 500 watts and was one of the earliest college radio stations in the nation. Due to a combination of the Great Depression and increasing costs of regulatory compliance, the station ceased operations in 1932. Today, the callsign WPSC is assigned to William Paterson University.

=== WDFM ===
In an effort to reestablish the tradition of student radio at Penn State, WDFM went on the air on December 6, 1953 as a result of the Senior Gift of the Class of 1951. Headquarters in 304 Sparks on the University Park campus, WDFM served its student audience for more than three decades. It changed its call letters to WPSU-FM in 1985. From the 1980s onward, student programming was progressively cut back. Later in the decade, more NPR programming was added to the schedule. By 1992, WPSU had become a full-fledged NPR affiliate with very few student ties and very little student programming. Despite the fact that the "new" radio station's mission and goals were dissimilar to those of early WDFM, the university allowed WPSU to exist.

=== Residence Hall Stations ===
==== WHR (West Halls Radio) ====
Founded in the 1960s, WHR was the first of three stations at Penn State specific to University Park residence halls. WHR, which stood for West Halls Radio, rebroadcast the WDFM signal and also produced and broadcast original content to its area residence halls.

==== WEHR (East Halls Radio) ====
Logo of the now-defunct East Halls Radio

On the AM dial, there also existed WEHR, a radio station in Penn State's East Residence Halls ("EHR" stands for "East Halls Radio"). At one time, three of Penn State's five residence areas possessed their own stations. WEHR was a typical freeform radio station; its playlist depended on the deejay.

Founded in 1972, WEHR originally broadcast from 10 Geary Hall, moving to 104 Johnston Commons around 1975. The station was set up to broadcast through the electric system in the dormitories of East Halls, via a carrier current, a system that failed miserably, so the station's main broadcast was through speakers into Johnston and Findlay commons. At some point, the station lost its ability to transmit over the radio dial and was forced to accept being heard infrequently on Penn State University's House and Food Services (HFS) Channel 21 on the on-campus cable television system.

The last broadcast schedule was posted on the station's website in 2005. Since that time, with limited resources, finances and student interest, WEHR ceased to function. The last staff to operate East Halls radio was Evan Raffel as General Manager, Alex Kozak and Programming Director, Jack Greening as deejay, Michael Boyson as Treasurer and James Peters as Business Manager. East Halls radio facility was said to house potentially the largest student archive of vinyl on-campus. From 1995 until 2005, Penn State had two student-run radio stations. By 2005, only WKPS remained.

==== WSHR (South Halls Radio) ====
Founded in the same year as WEHR, South Halls Radio was similarly inspired by WHR. Like its sister stations serving residence halls, it existed alongside WDFM, WHR, and WEHR to serve its student audience.

=== WKPS ===
Logo of The LION 90.7fm

A growing number of students in the early 1990s, having become aware of the lack of student broadcasting options on WPSU and disillusioned with their options, decided to give student radio another try. A small group, led by Jeff Ecker, asked the university to provide funding to begin a brand-new student-run radio station in the tradition of WDFM prior to its professionalization. The new station would seek to serve the listening community by providing alternative and cultural programming not found in local commercial radio. WKPS went on the air on Halloween on Tuesday, October 31, 1995. The first song ever played on its airwaves was "Please Play This Song on the Radio" by NOFX.

WKPS was chartered as a student club under Penn State's Office of Student Affairs in order to avoid a fate similar to that of WDFM, which had been created as a subsidiary of the College of Communications. Though this move would prove problematic for the radio station in the future, it was ultimately heralded as the decision which would keep the station firmly within the students' grasp. Lacking in any professional oversight, the early radio station relied heavily on the staff of WPSU 91.5 FM, with whom they shared the University-rented James building, which was also shared by the Daily Collegian, the university's student newspaper. Any oversight and support were extremely short-lived, however: WPSU relocated in May 1998.

According to its Federal Communications Commission, WKPS tweaked the original goals of WDFM, citing primarily the need to provide for the State College community and Penn State students with public service; secondarily, the need to provide a hands-on, co-curricular learning environment for students of any academic major interested in broadcast media; and finally, to provide a recreational extracurricular activity for students. Therefore, WKPS was open to students of all majors, not specifically those in the College of Communications for broadcast media. The station offered opportunities that the previous student radio stations hadn't seen including, in 1999, the start of students broadcasting Penn State football, and in 2001, the start of internet web-streaming of the station.

=== Problems with communication ===
By 2000, students in the University Park Allocations Committee, which replaced the SOBC, were not so inclined to give the station money. UPAC cut funding for The Lion 90.7FM by 80 percent during the 2000-2001 academic year, a decrease which nearly crippled the station. Student General Manager Mike Walsh secured funding from the office of Student Affairs, with its Vice President Bill Asbury allegedly promising to provide funding support for an additional five years. The exact terms of this verbal contract are contested—when Vicky Triponey became the Vice President of Student Affairs, the University claimed Asbury only promised three years.

In order to secure more professional oversight for the station, LION 90.7fm attempted the following year to create a mutually beneficial partnership with Penn State's College of Communications. The University agreed to create such a relationship, and the office of Student Affairs and the College of Communications each offered to pay half of the salary for a faculty adviser, which the new station had lacked since its inception. Jeff Brown, the faculty adviser, quickly moved to promote the agenda of the College of Communications - to create an exclusively co-curricular experience - without regard to the station's stated goals or charter as an extracurricular club in Student Affairs.

The rocky relationship continued and reached a boiling point when the College wired its student news studio into the station's sound board without proper communication or permission, leading to an incident known locally as "The LION Riot". It was at this time that faculty members of the College of Communications entered the WKPS studios while students were broadcasting live, proceeding to reprimand student broadcasters on-air for a perceived failure to broadcast a curricular-focused campus news segment. The LION 90.7fm still references this incident from time to time through audio imaging on the station. An article and partial transcript of the incident was published by a local independent newspaper, and complete audio of the incident continues to exist online.

=== WKPS funding controversy ===
Student staffers had only begun to get settled, however, when in 2004, newly installed Vice President of Student Affairs Vicky Triponey cut all funding to the radio station. Though she allegedly cited WKPS's flagship talk show Radio Free Penn State as the cause, she denied that its administratively-critical tack led to her decision. Instead, she claimed that The Lion 90.7FM was only promised three years of support by Asbury, a charge Asbury himself did not contest. The station managed to stay afloat, and with charitable contributions from listeners and alumni and help from UPAC, The Lion 90.7FM maintained its position in the Penn State Community.

A view of The LION 90.7fm's 2003-2015 "Room 9" studio in the HUB-Robeson Center

In late 2005, student General Manager Brandon W. Peach assumed the responsibility for putting the station back on the right financial track. While the problems with the administration would continue to grow, the radio station has been able to procure aid from alternate sources and continue to provide an outlet for multi-format student radio. In 2006, the Alumni Interest Group renewed the station's FCC License, held by the Penn State Board of Trustees for another eight-year term.

Faculty adviser Robert Zimmerman died on Monday, January 15, 2007, due to an allergic reaction to medication. He was 73 years old. The LION 90.7fm continued to operate, but was financially jeopardized due to high operating expenses and limited income sources.

==== Funding controversy aftermath ====
Recent graduate and former WKPS officer Christopher Buchignani was hired for substantially less to replace Jeff Brown for one year. In the summer of 2003, the College of Communications, who leased the space in the James Building, forced The LION 90.7fm to evict. [Stanley Latta, Director of Unions & Student Activities under Penn State's office of Student Affairs, authorized the station's move to the Hetzel Union Building. Room 9, right next to the HUB's large aquarium, was designated the main studio, with additional offices, one of which would become The Lion's production room, allotted to the station on floor three. On October 1, 2003, the station went live from Room 9.

Though the new station was smaller than the station to which the staff had become accustomed, it allowed for The LION 90.7fm to be physically independent. Live webcasts, added to the station's website the previous year, were launched for student and community audience of both State College residents and distant alumni. The webcasts continue to be popular, nearly reaching their listener capacity limit each time The LION 90.7fm broadcasts a Penn State football game.

=== Alumni Interest Group ===
The LION 90.7fm's Room 37 in the HUB-Robeson Center

In 2008, President and General Manager Tom Shakely began working with alumni to resuscitate the Penn State Student Radio Alumni Interest Group, an affiliate non-profit organization of the Penn State Alumni Association. The Alumni Interest Group had been founded in 2005 by then-faculty adviser Robert K. Zimmerman, but had become inactive after his death in 2007. Mike Gogel, a former President and General Manager of WKPS, became president of the Alumni Interest Group in 2009. During his two-year tenure the group created The Robert K. Zimmerman Endowment for Student Broadcasting at Penn State, the first endowed fund benefiting WKPS to support the perpetual financial needs of student broadcasting.

In 2011, another former President and General Manager, Brandon W. Peach, was elected to head the Alumni Interest Group. During his tenure the name of the group changed to the Penn State Media Association, while its mission expanded beyond traditional broadcasting to foster "relationships across the Penn State community for the purpose of connecting students, alumni, professors, and friends passionate about creating and promoting a more robust cultural environment through media." Specifically, the Penn State Media Association re-imagined its role in order to "support a diversity of student media endeavors, and relatedly, to promote a holistic approach to supporting student media that recognizes the interdisciplinary nature of contemporary media."

In 2014, the Penn State Media Association launched its second capital campaign, this time to create the "Penn State Media Association Trustee Scholarship for Student Broadcasters." The capital campaign seeks to endow this scholarship to benefit WKPS students with demonstrated financial need, and once realized will produce more than $10,000 annually in available scholarship assistance to student broadcasters.

== Shows ==
=== Weekday programming ===
- Motown In The Mornings (Weekdays 6 am-9 am) Motown music
- The Jazz Spectrum (9 am-11 am), wide variety of jazz music
- Trending (11 am-1 pm), new and trending music, throwback favorites, and Top 40 hits
- State Your Face' (Weekdays 2 pm-4 pm) Classic rock, new rock, alternative rock, and punk rock
- The Suburban Sound (Fridays 7 pm-9 pm), music talk show featuring indie rock, hip hop, heavy metal, blues, classic rock, and more
- Radio Free Penn State (Weekdays 4 pm-5 pm) is a public affairs talk show that focuses on topical issues relating to students at Penn State as well as concerns of the surrounding State College and Centre County communities. Occasionally, national issues have been covered during interviews of high-profile guests, including Dinesh D'Souza and Members of the United States Congress
- The Sports Blitz (Weekdays 5 pm-7 pm) is a talk-show hosted by a variety of students focusing on both Penn State and national sports (particularly football, basketball and baseball). The Sportsblitz also provides play-by-play of all home Penn State football games and select home basketball games.
- Graham's Jams (Thursdays 3 pm-4 pm) Varied music genres played with connective commentary with focus to dive deeper into lyrics, themes, and underlying messages
- Indie 500 (Monday-Wednesday 7 pm-9 pm, Saturday 5 pm-7 pm, Sunday 11 pm-1 am) focuses on independent artists and labels, and any music considered under the umbrella of indie rock
- Jam 91 (Monday-Wednesday 9pm-11pm, Thursday-Saturday 10 pm-1 am, Sunday 8 pm-12 am), urban and hip-hop music show
- BPM (Thursday-Saturday 7 pm-10 pm) is a dance, dubstep, house music, and industrial music show
- The Metal Machine (Monday-Thursday 11 pm-3 am) a late-night heavy metal music show
- Lion in Bed (State Your Face) (Monday-Thursday 3 am-6 am)

=== Weekend programming ===
- Kumekucha (Saturdays 9 a.m.-11 a.m.)
- Totally Gospel (Sundays 9 a.m.-11 a.m.), Gospel and soul music
- Latin Mix (Weekends 11 a.m.-1 p.m.), salsa, merengue, and other Spanish music
- Homegrown Music Show (Weekends 1 p.m.-3 p.m.), an extension of State Your Face, featuring classic rock music
- Indie 500 (Weekends 5 pm-7 pm)
- RPM (Weekends 7 p.m.-9 p.m.) features dance, house, electronica, ambient, and lounge music
- Jam 91 (Friday-Sunday 9 p.m.-1 a.m.)

== Previous shows ==
- Avant Garde (Friday-Sunday 1 a.m.-5 a.m.), a show hosted by "Cosmic" Ray Cromie. Avante Garde sought to highlight less-frequently featured musical stylings and unique spoken word.
- The Nooner (Weekdays 11 a.m.-1 p.m.) was a show featuring a wide collection of 1980s and 1990s new wave and pop music combined with alternative rock.
- The Classical Hour (Weekends 7 a.m.-9 a.m.) was a morning program that featured a wide array of Classical Music from Medieval to 21st century. Each show was based on a different theme that connected the music together
- Rockin' Culture Show (Weekdays 11 am-1 pm) was a program that featured alternative rock
- The Wake-Up Call with Burnie Thompson (Weekdays 7 a.m.-8 a.m.), a feature program hosted by Burnie Thompson was a feature program that discussed Penn State University, politics, and social matters from a libertarian perspective.
- Rush Hour
- Let's Talk Penn State (Weekdays 1-3 p.m.) was a very successful afternoon drive sports talk show hosted by two faculty members. They discussed Penn State Nittany Lions sports.
- Morningwood, a short-lived morning show that aired on weekday mornings discussing college life, hosted by students
- On The Good Foot (OTGF), a popular funk music show that ran for over 20 years
- Sustainability NOW, a talk show that ran for three years and focused on local students and community members that were doing things related to sustainability
- Bootycall (Sundays 11 p.m.-1 a.m.), a weekly show devoted to discussion of student dating and relationships in a college environment
- Grateful Dead Hour (Sundays 1-2 p.m.), a syndicated show featuring some of the best from the Grateful Dead for Penn State deadheads
- Coffee & Cigarettes (Weekdays 7-9 a.m.), the first morning show on the station, started by Jeff Ecker and Craig Shulz, offering an ensemble that featured water-cooler talk of all kinds. Its slogan was "There is no better way to wake up in the morning than with Coffee & Cigarettes".
- Rude Boy Reggae Hour (Tuesdays 9-11 p.m.), a roots and dancehall reggae show hosted by longtime friends Kip Talley and Jay-Boogie. Their wacky antics and diverse playlists quickly made this show a hit.

== Technical information ==
- Station Status: Licensed Class A Non-Commercial FM Station
- Effective Radiated Power: 100 Watts
- Height above Avg. Terrain: 26 meters (85 feet)
- Height above Ground Level: 39 meters (128 feet)
- Height above Sea Level: 411 meters (1349 feet)
- Antenna Pattern: Non-Directional
- Transmitter Location: 40°47'58" N, 77°52'11" W (Ford Building)
- License Granted: February 14, 1996
- License Expires: August 1, 2022

== See also ==
- WPSE, Penn State Erie's commercially licensed radio station serving financial news
- WPSU-FM, an NPR station operated by Pennsylvania State University
