= North Union Township, Fayette County, Pennsylvania =

Township in Pennsylvania, US

Coordinates: 39°52′00″N 79°36′59″W

North Union Township
- Township
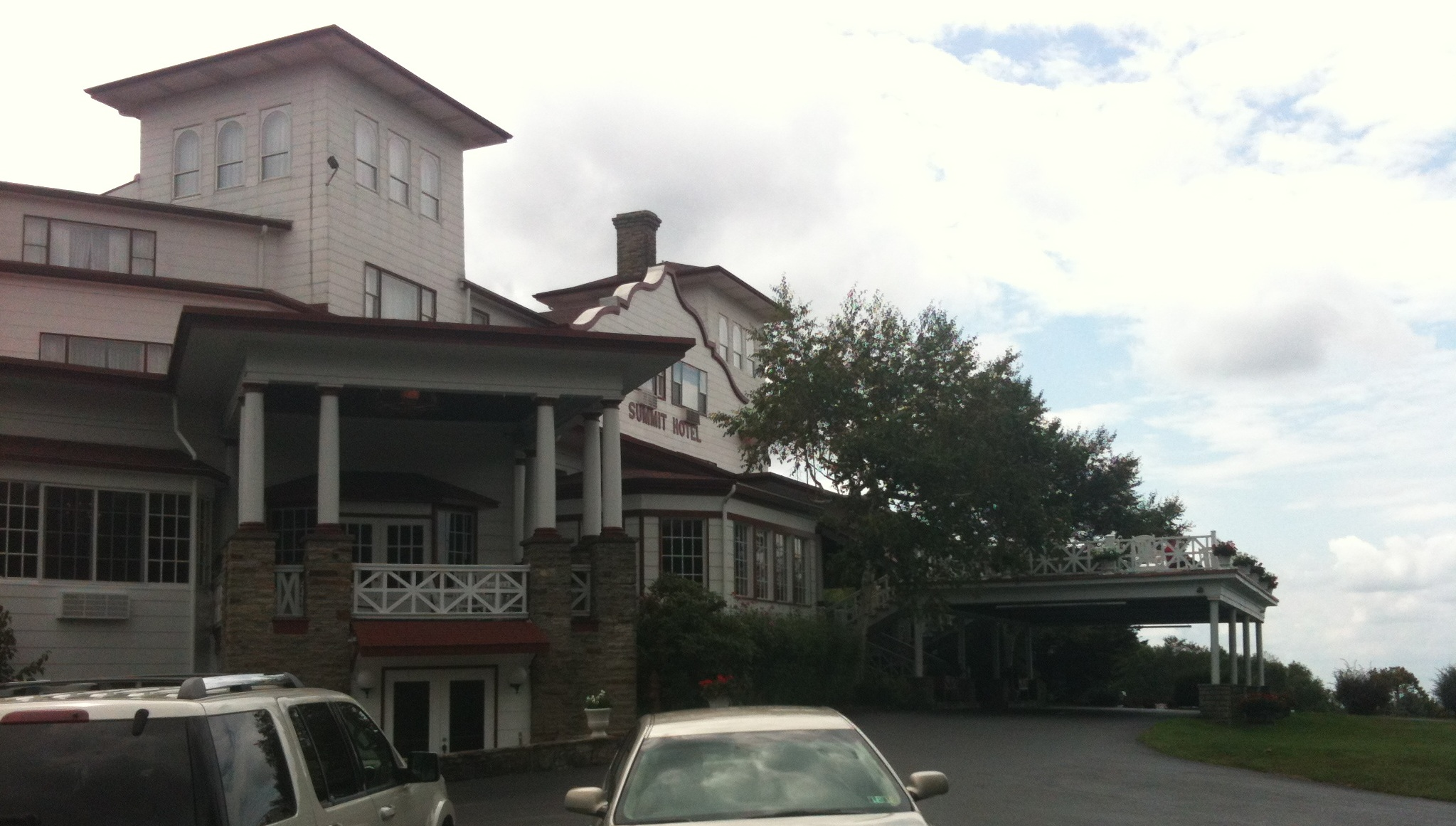
- The Summit Hotel atop Chestnut Ridge

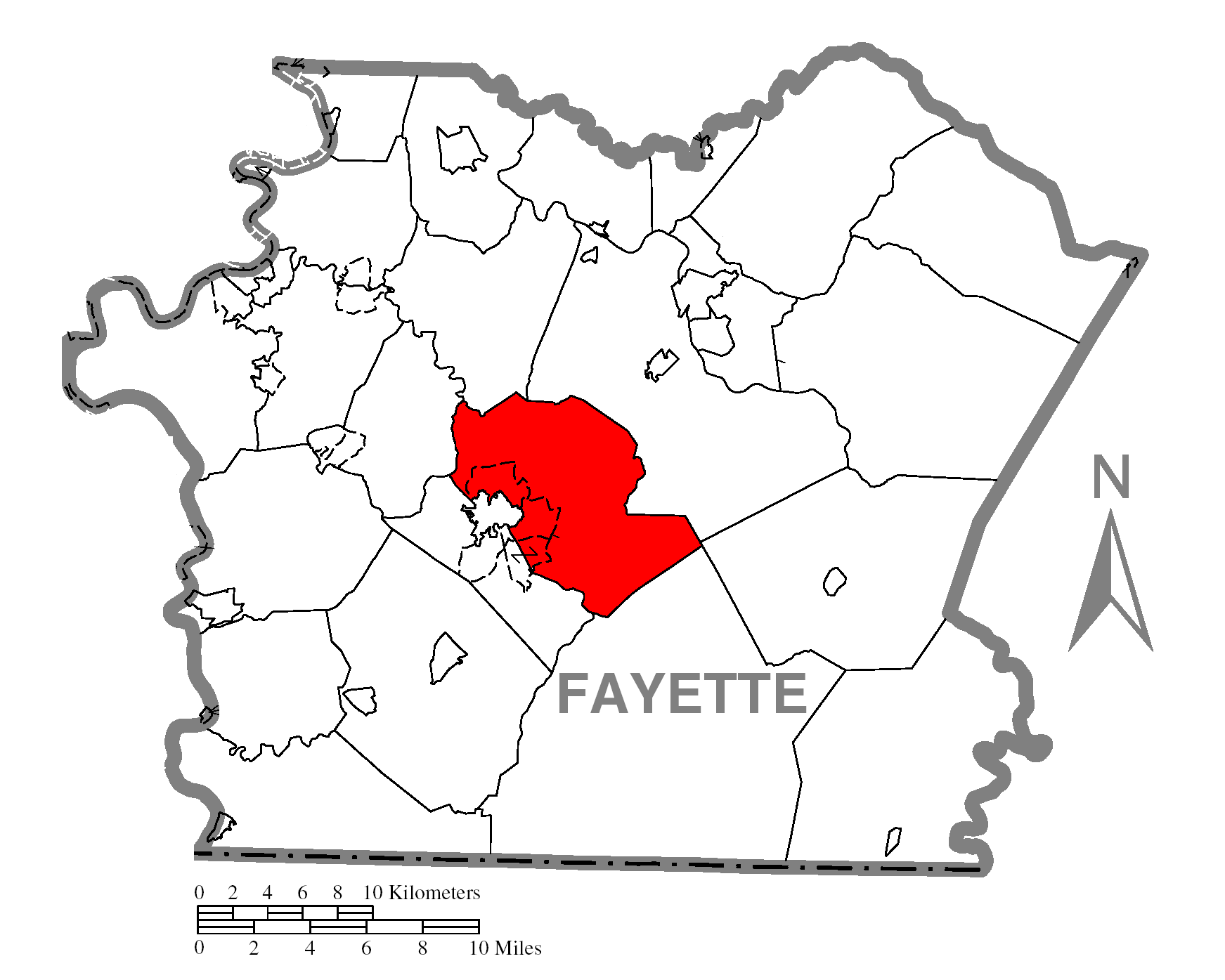
- Location of North Union Township in Fayette County

- Location of Fayette County in Pennsylvania
- Country: United States
- State: Pennsylvania
- County: Fayette
- Established: May 11, 1851

Area
  - Total: 39.03 sq mi (101.09 km^{2})
  - Land: 39.02 sq mi (101.06 km^{2})
  - Water: 0.012 sq mi (0.03 km^{2})

Population (2020)
  - Total: 11,829 ▼
  - Estimate (2022): 11,571
  - Density: 317/sq mi (122.3/km^{2})
- Time zone: UTC-4 (EST)
  - Summer (DST): UTC-5 (EDT)
- Area code: 724
- FIPS code: 42-051-55464
- Website: northuniontownship-pa.gov

North Union Township is a township in Fayette County, Pennsylvania, United States. The population was 11,829 at the 2020 census, a decline from the figure of 12,728 tabulated in 2010. The Laurel Highlands School District serves the township.

Unincorporated communities within the township include Oliver, Phillips, Lemont Furnace, Mount Braddock, Jumonville, East Uniontown, Coolspring, West Leisenring, Bethelboro, Youngstown, Percy, Mount Independence, Morgan, Evans Manor, and part of Hopwood.

== History ==
North Union Township was formed from Union Township in 1851.

Union Township was created in 1783, one of Fayette County's original townships. The borough of Uniontown was taken from it in 1796, and a part of Wharton Township was added to it in 1802. In 1851 Union Township was split along the National Road into North Union and South Union townships. A portion of Franklin Township was added to North Union in 1872.

The Oak Hill Estate, Springer Farm, and Summit Hotel are listed on the National Register of Historic Places.

== Geography ==
North Union Township is in the center of Fayette County. It is bordered to the southwest by the city of Uniontown, the county seat. U.S. Route 119 crosses the northern part of the township, leading northeast to Connellsville and southwest to Morgantown, West Virginia. U.S. Route 40, the National Road, forms the southwest border of the township, except where the highway passes through Uniontown; US 40 leads southeast to Cumberland, Maryland, and northwest to Washington. The Mon–Fayette Expressway interchanges with US 119 in the Oliver part of the township, just north of Uniontown; the expressway leads northwest to Centerville and southwest to Morgantown.

The eastern half of Union Township occupies the hilltops and western slope of Chestnut Ridge, with the highest elevation of 2,670 feet (810 m) located near the southeast corner of the township, just north of the Summit Hotel. The lowest point in the township is 910 feet (280 m) above sea level, along Redstone Creek where it exits the township from its northwestern corner.

According to the United States Census Bureau, the township has a total area of 39.0 square miles (101.1 km^{2}), of which 0.01 square miles (0.03 km^{2}), or 0.03%, is water.

== Demographics ==
Historical population
Census	Pop.	Note	%±
2000	14,140		—
2010	12,728		−10.0%
2020	11,829		−7.1%
2022 (est.)	11,571		−2.2%
U.S. Decennial Census

As of the 2000 census, there were 14,140 people, 5,805 households, and 3,999 families residing in the township. The population density was 365.4 inhabitants per square mile (141.1/km^{2}). There were 6,234 housing units at an average density of 161.1 per square mile (62.2/km^{2}). The racial makeup of the township was 96.32% White, 2.60% African American, 0.12% Native American, 0.28% Asian, 0.01% Pacific Islander, 0.11% from other races, and 0.56% from two or more races. Hispanics or Latinos of any race were 0.42% of the population.

There were 5,805 households, out of which 27.8% had children under the age of 18 living with them, 50.3% were married couples living together, 13.9% had a female householder with no husband present, and 31.1% were non-families. 28.0% of all households were made up of individuals, and 13.6% had someone living alone who was 65 years of age or older. The average household size was 2.40, and the average family size was 2.91.

In the township the population was spread out, with 21.7% under the age of 18, 8.1% from 18 to 24, 26.6% from 25 to 44, 25.9% from 45 to 64, and 17.7% who were 65 years of age or older. The median age was 41 years. For every 100 females there were 90.1 males. For every 100 females age 18 and over, there were 84.6 males.

The median income for a household in the township was $25,153, and the median income for a family was $33,031. Males had a median income of $27,414 versus $20,695 for females. The per capita income for the township was $14,265. About 15.7% of families and 19.4% of the population were below the poverty line, including 29.2% of those under age 18 and 14.5% of those age 65 or over.

== Localities ==
Near the village of Oliver is the smallest of Uniontown's three shopping districts.

Penn State Fayette, a small branch campus of the university system, is located in North Union Township. The college offers two-year degrees and many starter programs for four-year majors, although most four-year degrees must be finished at the main campus.

The township's northern edge is where the French and Indian War began on May 28, 1754. George Washington and Virginia militiamen, fighting along with the Native chief Tanacharison and his friendly tribesmen, routed the French in the controversial Battle of Jumonville Glen, near the present village of Jumonville.
