= John Hopwood =

American civil servant & Early American pioneer

John Hopwood (1745 – June 2, 1802) was an American civil servant during the American Revolutionary War and founded the town of Hopwood, Pennsylvania (originally named "Woodstock") in western Pennsylvania. John Hopwood was born in Virginia and married Hannah Bearcroft/Barecroft Humphreys, the young widow of Joseph Humphries, in 1770.

According to local and family lore, he was a neighbor and trusted friend of George Washington, who in recognition of his merit, selected him as an aide-de-camp and assigned him the responsibility of selecting winter quarters for the French Army. However, there is no supporting evidence of this beyond local histories compiled in the late 19th century; per the Daughters of the American Revolution, Hopwood was only recorded as having "furnished supplies" and having served as a juror.

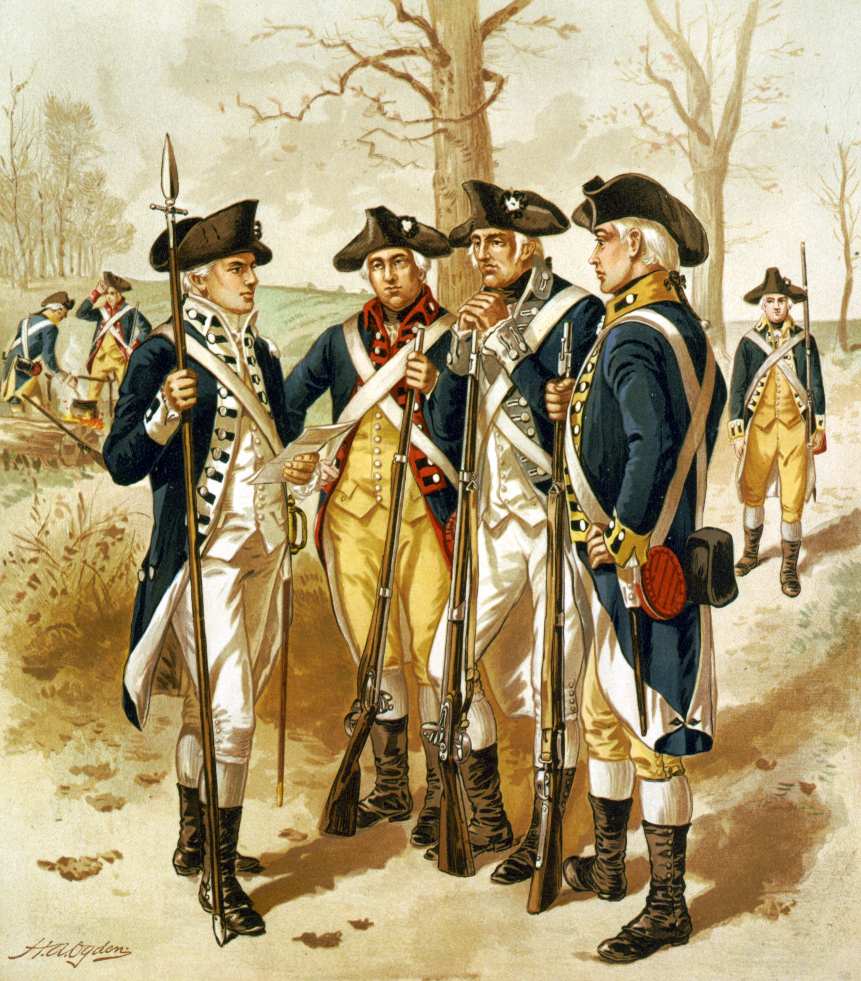
Continental Army (1779–1783)

== Purported military service ==
According to a roll of Captain Alex Smith, Company of Colonel Rawlings’ Regiment commanded by Colonel J. Hall, a John Hopwood served under Captain Thomas Bell’s Company for a period of three years. The Maryland Revolutionary War Militia muster rolls also list a John Hopwood as being a member of the 6th Company Montgomery County, Maryland Militia in September 1777 and as being a member of the 6th Company, commanded by Captain Thomas Conner, on July 15, 1780; under the Command of Colonel Archibald Orme.

John Hopwood founded Hopwood, Pennsylvania, when he left Stafford County, Virginia, at the close of the War. It is alleged that when George Washington purchased 1,600 acres (6.5 km^{2}) in Perryopolis, his friend John Hopwood also bought land, the land that became the Village of Hopwood at the foot of the Chestnut Ridge in Fayette County, Pennsylvania.

== Hopwood, Pennsylvania ==
Having purchased several large tracts of land in and around present-day Hopwood, John Hopwood recorded a town plan at the courthouse in nearby Uniontown, Pennsylvania, on November 8, 1791, drawing up a rather unusual set of 400 level lots, each sectioned into a half an acre. He designed the village town with wide, straight roads and offered the new lots to settlers at a payment installation option which was then very uncommon.

New residents had 10 years to pay off the lots, with the stipulation that a dwelling had to be erected on the site within five years of purchase. Hopwood offered new residents all the free stone and timber they needed to construct their new homes. He dubbed the town "Woodstock." The "Charter of the Town of Woodstock" as written by Hopwood was printed by the noted Early American printer/publisher Nathaniel Willis (grandfather of Nathaniel Parker Willis) in Martinsburg, West Virginia (then Virginia). The Charter is listed in many libraries' reference microfiche collections (including The Library of Congress and The Library of Virginia) and in reference works (including Sabin's "Bibliotheca Americana" ), as an "Early American Imprint" and is also considered to be one of the earliest known works published in what is now the state of West Virginia.

The village was renamed "Monroe" in 1816 after President James Monroe stayed at the Moses Hopwood House. However, when it was discovered in 1881 that another town of Monroe already existed in the Commonwealth, it was renamed "Hopwood" after its founding father.

John Hopwood, a member of the Great Bethel Baptist Church, died June 2, 1802, in Hopwood, Pennsylvania. He was buried in Hopwood Cemetery (also known as the Founding Fathers Cemetery) where the following is inscribed upon his original tombstone

John Hopwood senior who departed this life June 2nd A.D. 1802, aged 57 years. He who can leave a cottage or a throne and alone with his spacious mind dwell.

His replacement tombstone, raised in 1991 during the Hopwood bicentennial, also states: "Rev[olutionary War] Aide to George Washington - Village Founder".

== Family ==
William DeFord, a Hopwood grandson, was a Justice of the peace in Carroll County, Ohio and also served as a member of the Ohio House of Representatives. Hopwood DePree, a John Hopwood descendant, had been restoring the Hopwood ancestral home in Middleton, Greater Manchester, England (Hopwood Hall a Grade II* historic house), but a recent local borough council decision has put that restoration in jeopardy.
