= Leith-Hatfield, Pennsylvania =

Unincorporated community in Pennsylvania, US

- Census-designated place
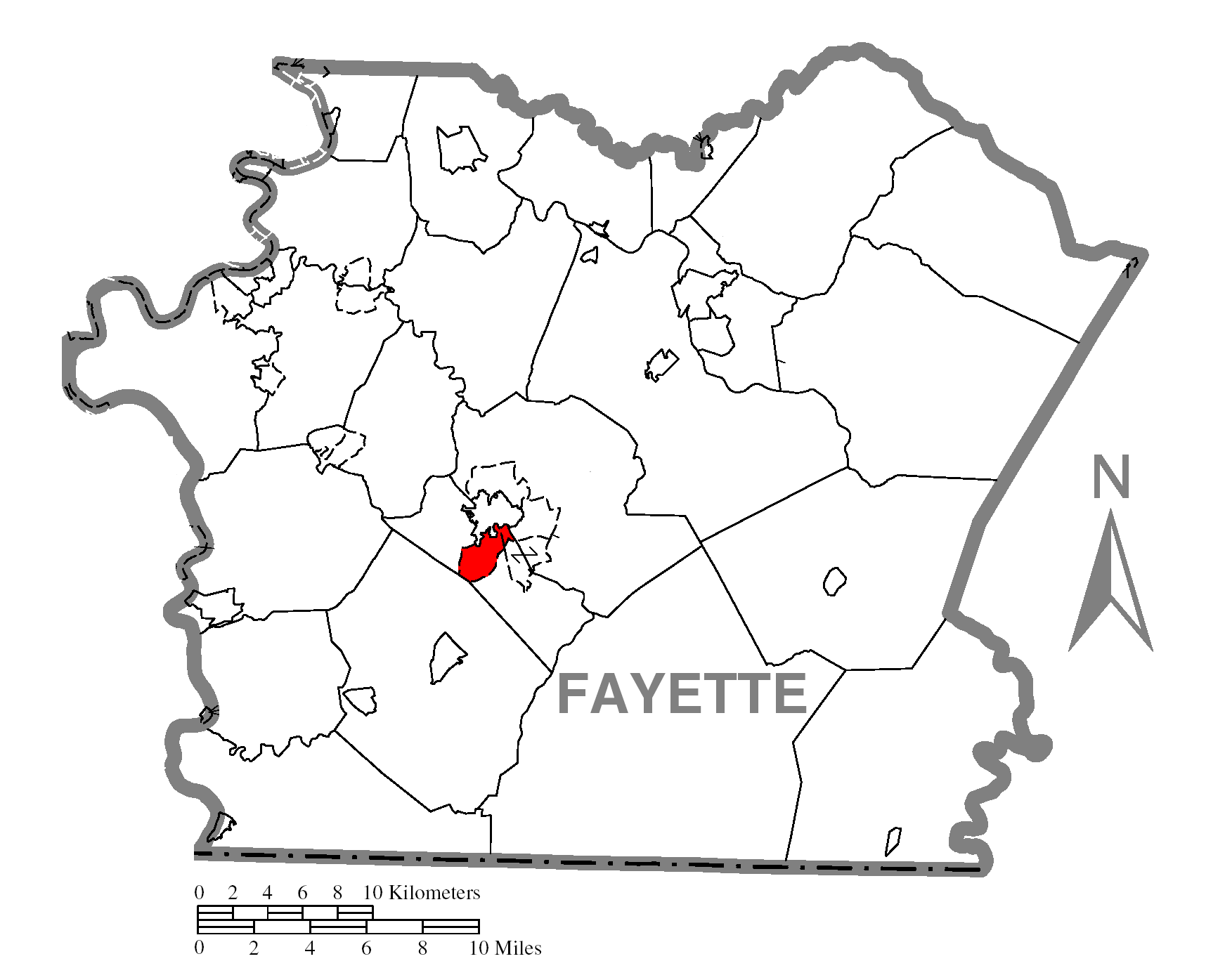
- Location of Leith-Hatfield in Fayette County
- Coordinates: 39°52′56″N 79°43′50″W
- Country: United States
- State: Pennsylvania
- County: Fayette
- Township: South Union

Area
  - Total: 1.85 sq mi (4.79 km^{2})
  - Land: 1.85 sq mi (4.79 km^{2})
  - Water: 0 sq mi (0.00 km^{2})

Population (2020)
  - Total: 2,672
  - Density: 1,446.1/sq mi (558.35/km^{2})
- Time zone: UTC-4 (EST)
  - Summer (DST): UTC-5 (EDT)
- ZIP code: 15401
- Area code: 724
- FIPS code: 42-42596

Leith-Hatfield is a census-designated place (CDP) in Fayette County, Pennsylvania, United States. The population was 2,546 at the 2010 census, down from 2,820 at the 2000 census. The twin villages of Leith and Hatfield are located in South Union Township.

== Geography ==
Leith-Hatfield is located in central Fayette County at 39°52′56″N 79°43′50″W (39.882317, −79.730563). It is bordered to the north by the city of Uniontown, the county seat. The CDP is bordered by Hopwood to the northeast and by Georges Township to the south.

The Mon–Fayette Expressway, carrying Pennsylvania Route 43, U.S. Route 40 and U.S. Route 119 on a bypass of Uniontown, passes through the western part of the CDP. US 40 diverges east from the expressway at an interchange in the southwestern corner of the CDP, continuing as a four-lane freeway. The Mon–Fayette Expressway leads northwest 43 miles (69 km) to Jefferson Hills in the suburbs south of Pittsburgh, and southwest 15 miles (24 km) to Interstate 68 east of Morgantown, West Virginia. US 119 leads northeast 15 miles (24 km) to Connellsville, and US 40 leads southeast 62 miles (100 km) to Cumberland, Maryland.

According to the United States Census Bureau, the Leith-Hatfield CDP has a total area of 1.85 square miles (4.79 km^{2}), all land.

== Demographics ==
Historical population
Census	Pop.	Note	%±
2020	2,672		—
U.S. Decennial Census

As of the 2000 census, there were 2,820 people, 1,098 households, and 802 families residing in the CDP. The population density was 1,506.8 inhabitants per square mile (581.8/km^{2}). There were 1,143 housing units at an average density of 610.7 per square mile (235.8/km^{2}). The racial makeup of the CDP was 97.06% White, 0.57% African American, 0.11% Native American, 1.56% Asian, 0.04% Pacific Islander, 0.07% from other races, and 0.60% from two or more races. Hispanic or Latino of any race were 0.14% of the population.

There were 1,098 households, out of which 28.4% had children under the age of 18 living with them, 62.0% were married couples living together, 8.0% had a female householder with no husband present, and 26.9% were non-families. 24.3% of all households were made up of individuals, and 16.1% had someone living alone who was 65 years of age or older. The average household size was 2.46 and the average family size was 2.92.

In the CDP, the population was spread out, with 21.3% under the age of 18, 5.3% from 18 to 24, 22.4% from 25 to 44, 26.8% from 45 to 64, and 24.1% who were 65 years of age or older. The median age was 46 years. For every 100 females, there were 85.5 males. For every 100 females age 18 and over, there were 82.4 males.

The median income for a household in the CDP was $50,690, and the median income for a family was $61,786. Males had a median income of $44,125 versus $24,805 for females. The per capita income for the CDP was $26,943. About 7.0% of families and 8.7% of the population were below the poverty line, including 11.3% of those under age 18 and 7.1% of those age 65 or over.
