= Deford =

Deford may refer to:

== People ==
=== Surnames ===
- Frank Deford (1938–2017), American sportswriter and commentator
- Jelly Roll (singer) (born as Jason Bradley DeFord 1984), American rapper
- Miriam Allen deFord (1888–1975), American writer
- William DeFord (1807–1898), American politician from Ohio

=== Given names ===
- DeFord Bailey (1899–1982), early country music star and the first African American performer on the Grand Ole Opry

== Places ==
- Deford, Michigan, United States, a community in Tuscola County
