= East Uniontown, Pennsylvania =

Unincorporated community in Pennsylvania, US

- Census-designated place
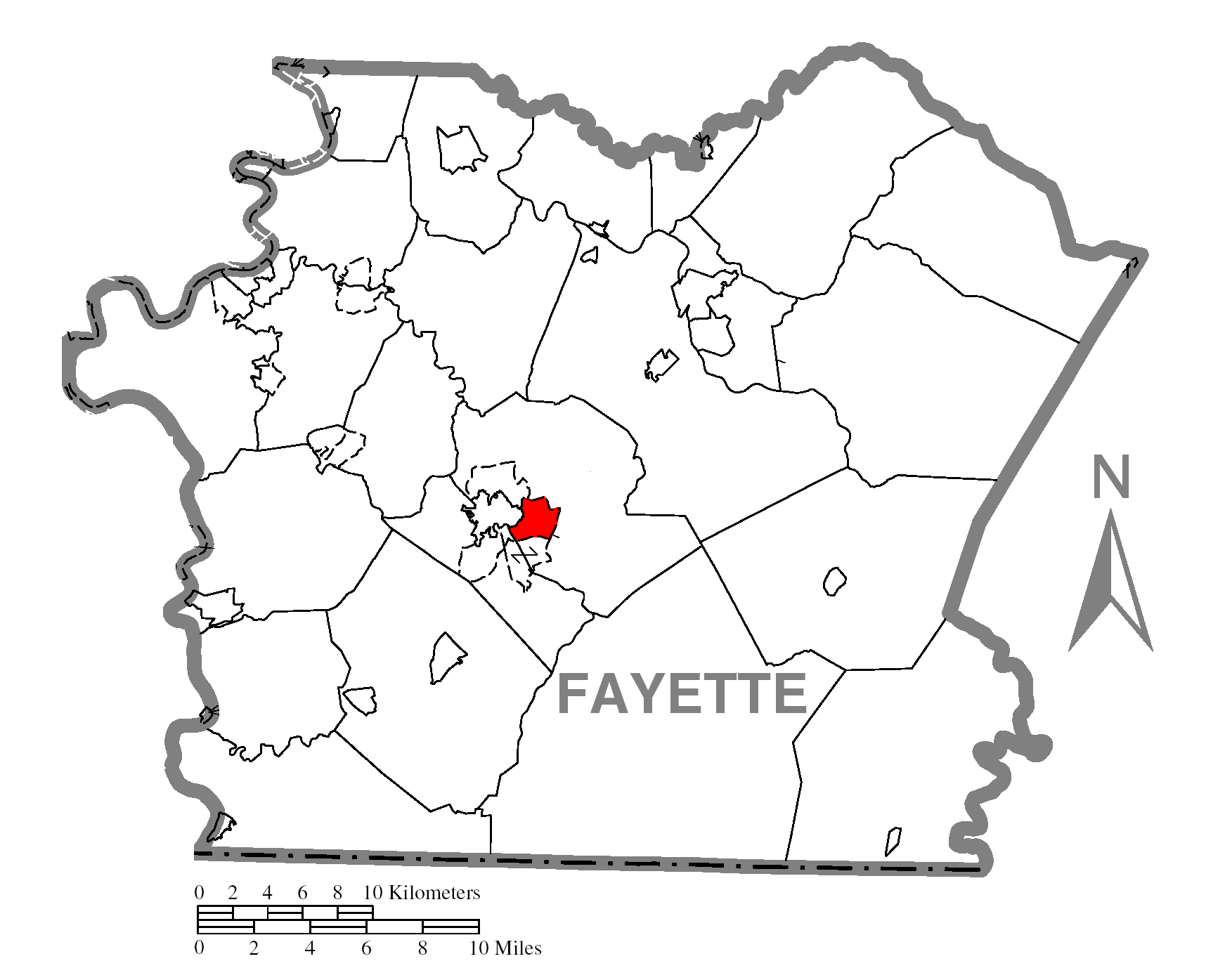
- Location of East Uniontown in Fayette County
- Coordinates: 39°53′51″N 79°42′16″W
- Country: United States
- State: Pennsylvania
- County: Fayette
- Townships: North Union, South Union

Area
  - Total: 1.99 sq mi (5.16 km^{2})
  - Land: 1.99 sq mi (5.16 km^{2})
  - Water: 0 sq mi (0.00 km^{2})

Population (2020)
  - Total: 2,271
  - Density: 1,139.6/sq mi (440.02/km^{2})
- Time zone: UTC-4 (EST)
  - Summer (DST): UTC-5 (EDT)
- Area code: 724
- FIPS code: 42-21960

East Uniontown is a census-designated place (CDP) in Fayette County, Pennsylvania, United States. The population was 2,419 at the 2010 census, down from 2,760 at the 2000 census.

== Geography ==
East Uniontown is located primarily in North Union Township at 39°53′51″N 79°42′16″W (39.897604, −79.704464). The CDP extends west into South Union Township as well. It is bordered to the northwest by the city of Uniontown, the Fayette County seat. To the north it is bordered by the Oliver CDP, and to the south by the Hopwood CDP. To the east is Lemont Furnace.

U.S. Route 40 Business (the National Pike) passes through the western part of East Uniontown, forming the boundary between North Union and South Union townships. The two-lane road leads northwest into the center of Uniontown and southeast to U.S. Route 40 in Hopwood.

According to the United States Census Bureau, the East Uniontown CDP has a total area of 2.0 square miles (5.2 km^{2}), all land.

== Demographics ==
Historical population
Census	Pop.	Note	%±
2020	2,271		—
U.S. Decennial Census

As of the 2000 census, there were 2,760 people, 1,181 households, and 761 families residing in the CDP. The population density was 1,375.7 inhabitants per square mile (531.2/km^{2}). There were 1,271 housing units at an average density of 633.5 per square mile (244.6/km^{2}). The racial makeup of the CDP was 92.86% White, 6.05% African American, 0.04% Native American, 0.22% Asian, 0.29% from other races, and 0.54% from two or more races. Hispanic or Latino of any race were 0.47% of the population.

There were 1,181 households, out of which 29.5% had children under the age of 18 living with them, 42.4% were married couples living together, 17.1% had a female householder with no husband present, and 35.5% were non-families. 32.7% of all households were made up of individuals, and 15.2% had someone living alone who was 65 years of age or older. The average household size was 2.29 and the average family size was 2.88.

In the CDP, the population was spread out, with 23.6% under the age of 18, 7.9% from 18 to 24, 27.4% from 25 to 44, 22.8% from 45 to 64, and 18.4% who were 65 years of age or older. The median age was 39 years. For every 100 females, there were 88.1 males. For every 100 females age 18 and over, there were 83.8 males.

The median income for a household in the CDP was $20,877, and the median income for a family was $28,566. Males had a median income of $26,318 versus $22,955 for females. The per capita income for the CDP was $14,751. About 27.2% of families and 29.9% of the population were below the poverty line, including 49.5% of those under age 18 and 10.7% of those age 65 or over.
