= Leonard Harsh =

American politician (1801–1866)

Member of the Ohio House of Representatives from the Carroll County district
- In office 1862–1864
- Preceded by: Amos E. Buss
- Succeeded by: William DeFord

Member of the Ohio House of Representatives from the Jefferson and Carroll counties district
- In office 1843–1844 Serving with Smily H. Johnson and Isaac Shane
- Preceded by: Nathaniel Dike and Isaac Atkinson
- Succeeded by: new district

Personal details
- Born: March 22, 1801 Washington County, Pennsylvania, U.S.
- Died: 1866 (aged 64–65)
- Spouse(s): Anne Gants (m. 1822; died 1830) Sally Cook (m. 1831; died 1839) Nancy Potter (m. 1856; died 1863)
- Children: 12
- Occupation: Politician

Leonard Harsh (March 22, 1801 – 1866) was an American politician from Ohio. He served as a member of the Ohio House of Representatives from 1843 to 1844 and from 1862 to 1864.

== Early life ==
Leonard Harsh was born on March 22, 1801, in Washington County, Pennsylvania, to Christina (née Stricker) and Philip Harsh. He moved to Carroll County, Ohio, at a young age.

== Career ==
Harsh served as justice of the peace for 25 years. He was a member of the state board of equalization.

Harsh served as a member of the Ohio House of Representatives, representing Carroll and Jefferson counties from 1843 to 1844. He later represented the Carroll County district in the Ohio House from 1862 to 1864.

== Personal life ==
Harsh married Anne Gants in 1822. They had four children, Samuel, Levi, Sarah Anne and Jacob W. His wife died in 1830. He married Sarah "Sally" Cook on February 24, 1831. They had five children, Almira, Elizabeth, Emanuel, Phoebe and Abel. His wife died in 1839. He married Nancy Potter on April 17, 1856. They had three children, Albert Franklin, Nancy Jane and Catharine. His wife died in 1863. His daughter Almira married Albert R. Haines, Ohio senator. He lived in Harrison Township.

Harsh died in 1866.
