= North Beach (film) =

- Directed by: Jed Mortenson; Richard Speight Jr.
- Written by: Casey Peterson
- Produced by: Jed Mortenson; Casey Peterson
- Starring: Casey Peterson; Richard Speight Jr.
- Cinematography: Mark Herzig
- Edited by: David Crowther
- Production companies: Dirk and Morty; Fur Boat Films
- Distributed by: Leo Films
- Release date: June 7, 2000 (Newport)
- Running time: 78 minutes
- Country: United States
- Language: English

North Beach is a 2000 American comedy-drama film co-directed by and starring Richard Speight Jr.

== Cast ==
- Casey Peterson as Tyler
- Jennifer Milmore as Paige
- Gabrielle Anwar as Lu
- Jim Hanna as Robbie
- Barrow Davis as Veronica
- Hopwood DePree as Ted
- Richard Speight Jr. as Pete

== Reception ==
James Brundage of Contactmusic.com gave the film four and a half stars out of five.
