= Springer Farm (Uniontown, Pennsylvania) =

Historic house in Pennsylvania, United States

- U.S. National Register of Historic Places
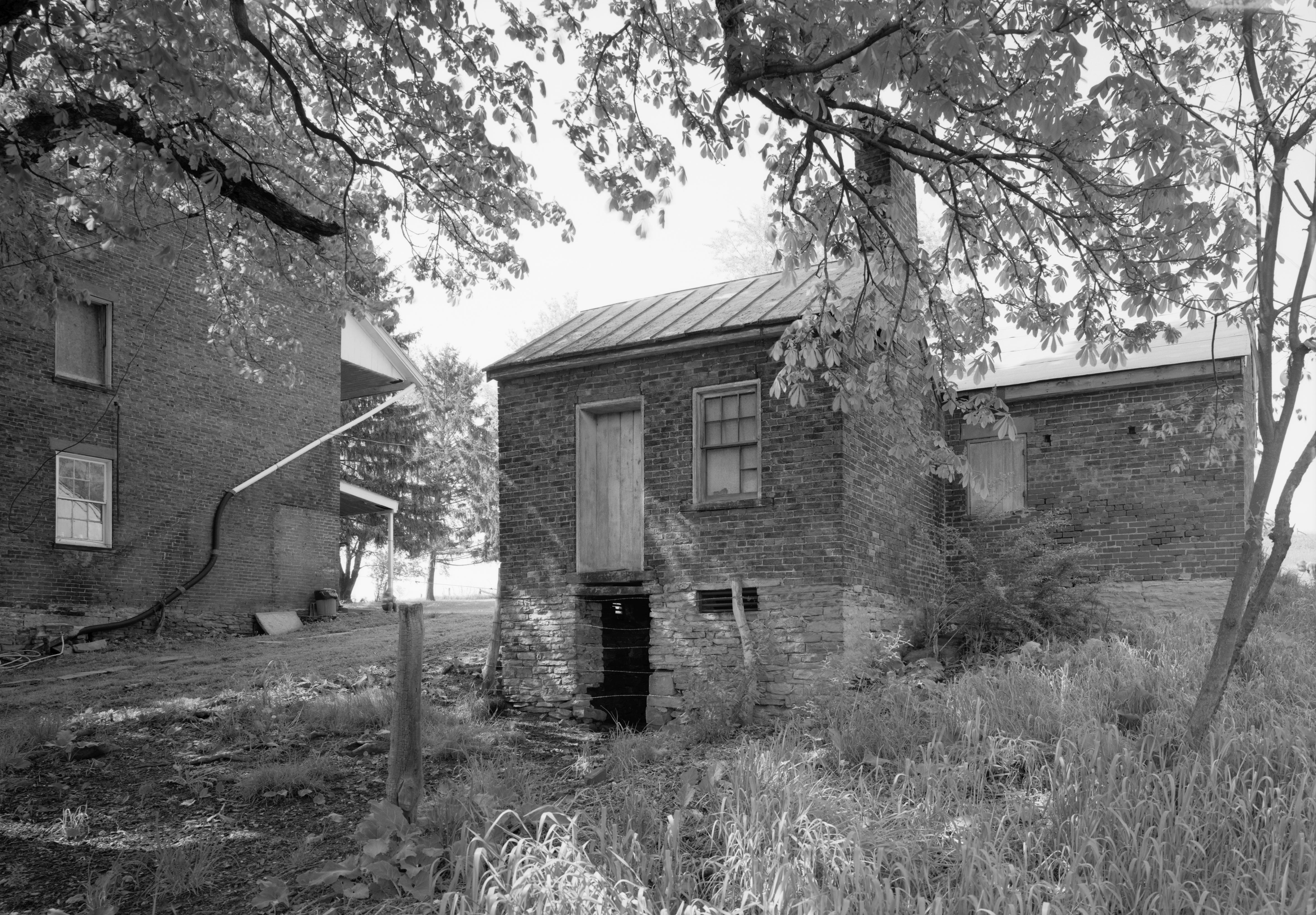
- Springer Farm buildings, 1989

- Location within Pennsylvania Location within the United States
- Location: Pennsylvania Route 51, northwest of Uniontown, North Union Township, Pennsylvania
- Coordinates: 39°58′23″N 79°53′55″W
- Area: 24.6 acres (10.0 ha)
- Built: c. 1817
- Built by: Springer, Levi
- NRHP reference No.: 82003788
- Added to NRHP: July 23, 1982

The Springer Farm is an historic home and farm complex that is located in North Union Township, Fayette County, Pennsylvania, United States.

It was added to the National Register of Historic Places in 1982.

== History and architectural features ==
Contributing buildings on this historic property are the brick farmhouse, a brick spring house/smokehouse, and a frame barn. The house was built circa 1817 and is a 2 1/2-story, fourteen-room, rectangular building that sits on a rubble stone foundation. It measures 65 feet by 35.6 feet and has a center hall plan.
