= Oliver, Pennsylvania =

Unincorporated community in Pennsylvania, US

- Census-designated place
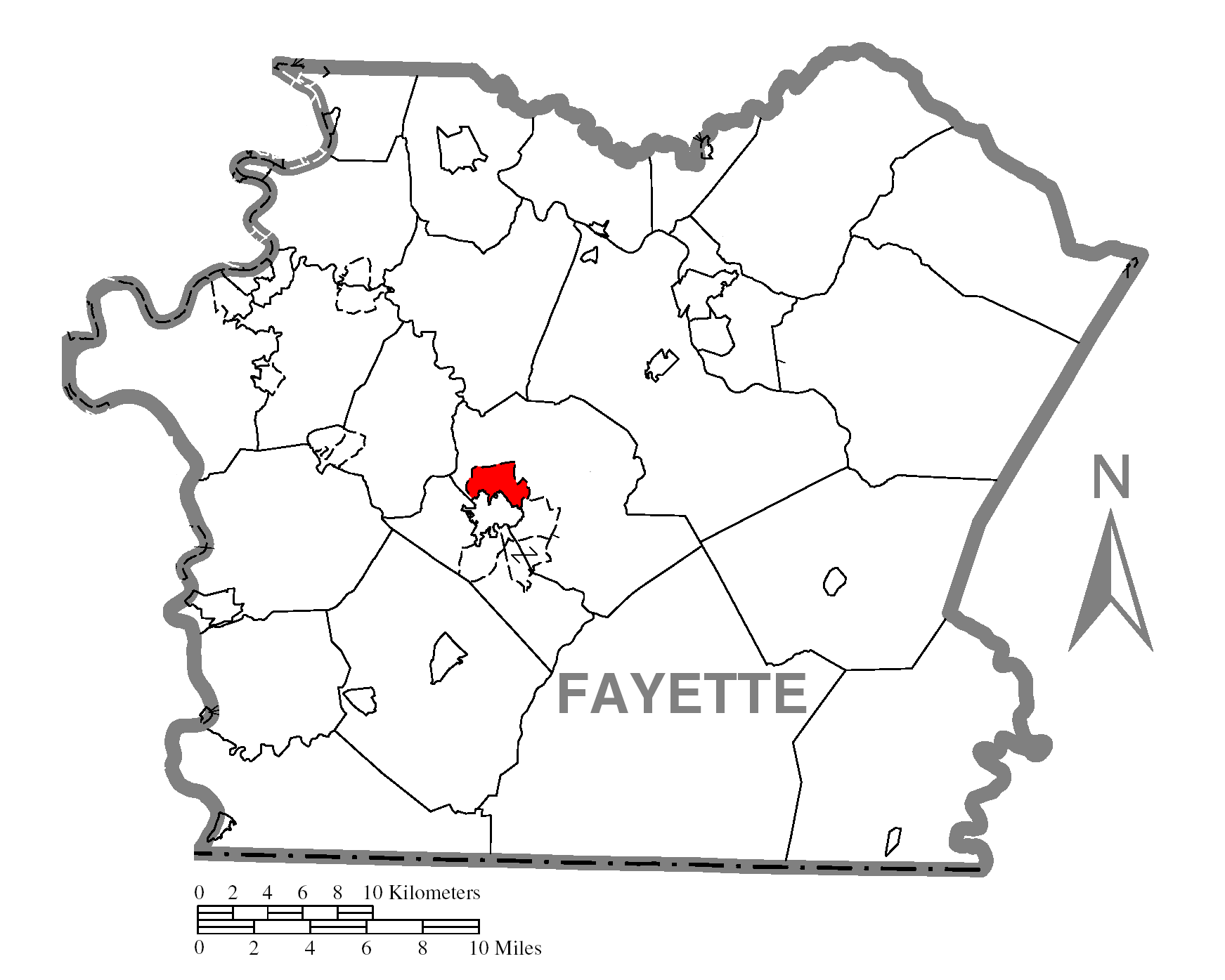
- Location of Oliver in Fayette County
- Coordinates: 39°54′52″N 79°43′2″W
- Country: United States
- State: Pennsylvania
- County: Fayette
- Township: North Union

Area
  - Total: 2.22 sq mi (5.75 km^{2})
  - Land: 2.22 sq mi (5.75 km^{2})
  - Water: 0 sq mi (0.00 km^{2})

Population (2020)
  - Total: 2,538
  - Density: 1,142.9/sq mi (441.28/km^{2})
- Time zone: UTC-4 (EST)
  - Summer (DST): UTC-5 (EDT)
- ZIP code: 15401
- Area code: 724
- FIPS code: 42-56704

Oliver is a census-designated place (CDP) in Fayette County, Pennsylvania, United States. The population was 2,535 at the 2010 census, down from 2,925 at the 2000 census. Oliver is located in North Union Township.

== Geography ==
Oliver is located in central Fayette County at 39°54′52″N 79°43′2″W (39.914359, −79.717139). It is bordered to the south by the city of Uniontown, the county seat. To the southeast it is bordered by the suburb of East Uniontown.

U.S. Route 119, a four-lane bypass of Uniontown, passes through Oliver. The Mon–Fayette Expressway branches off US-119 near the center of Oliver. US 119 leads northeastward 10 miles (16 km) to Connellsville, while the Mon–Fayette leads northwest and north 42 miles (68 km) to Jefferson Hills south of Pittsburgh. US-119 and the Mon–Fayette lead southwest 29 miles (47 km) to Morgantown, West Virginia.

According to the United States Census Bureau, the CDP has a total area of 2.2 square miles (5.7 km^{2}), all land.

=== Climate ===
The climate in this area features relatively small differences between high and low temperatures, and there is adequate rainfall year-round. According to the Köppen Climate Classification system, Oliver has a marine west coast climate, abbreviated "Cfb" on climate maps.

== Demographics ==
Historical population
Census	Pop.	Note	%±
2020	2,538		—
U.S. Decennial Census

As of the 2000 census, there were 2,925 people, 1,267 households, and 819 families residing in the CDP. The population density was 1,324.1 inhabitants per square mile (511.2/km^{2}). There were 1,375 housing units at an average density of 622.4 per square mile (240.3/km^{2}). The racial makeup of the CDP was 91.45% White, 6.91% African American, 0.24% Native American, 0.48% Asian, 0.03% Pacific Islander, 0.10% from other races, and 0.79% from two or more races. Hispanic or Latino of any race were 0.51% of the population.

There were 1,267 households, out of which 26.0% had children under the age of 18 living with them, 41.0% were married couples living together, 18.5% had a female householder with no husband present, and 35.3% were non-families. 32.2% of all households were made up of individuals, and 17.4% had someone living alone who was 65 years of age or older. The average household size was 2.25 and the average family size was 2.82.

In the CDP, the population was spread out, with 21.2% under the age of 18, 8.3% from 18 to 24, 24.7% from 25 to 44, 24.5% from 45 to 64, and 21.3% who were 65 years of age or older. The median age was 41 years. For every 100 females, there were 82.0 males. For every 100 females age 18 and over, there were 75.4 males.

The median income for a household in the CDP was $23,333, and the median income for a family was $34,402. Males had a median income of $25,531 versus $20,669 for females. The per capita income for the CDP was $13,509. About 13.6% of families and 18.5% of the population were below the poverty line, including 31.3% of those under age 18 and 15.2% of those age 65 or over.
