= Monroe Tavern =

Historic tavern in Pennsylvania, United States

- U.S. National Register of Historic Places
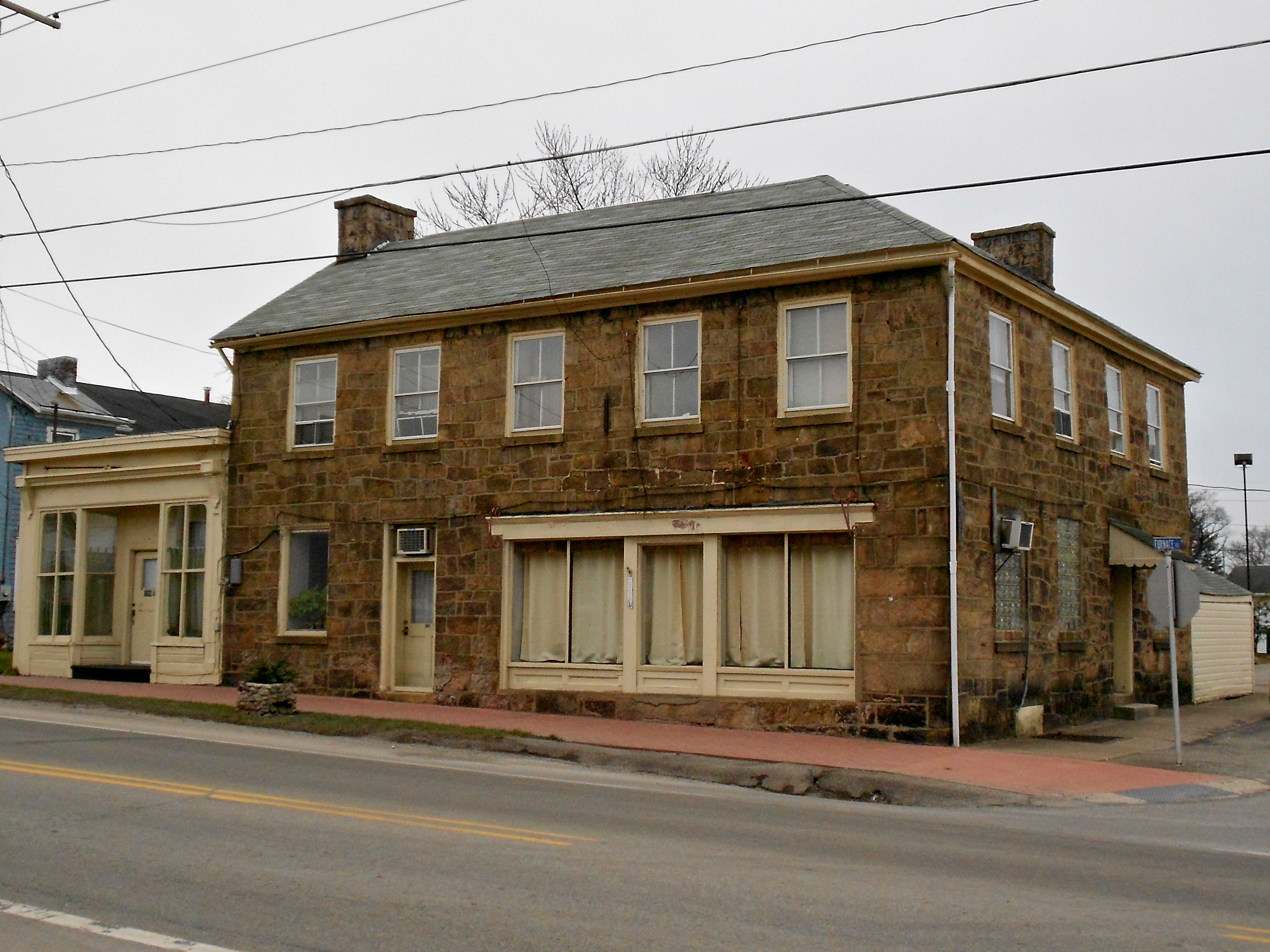
- The tavern in 2013

- Location within Pennsylvania Location within the United States
- Location: U.S. Route 40 (Main Street) in Hopwood, South Union Township, Pennsylvania
- Coordinates: 39°52′32″N 79°42′5″W
- Area: less than one acre
- Built: c. 1825
- Architectural style: Early Republic
- MPS: National Road in Pennsylvania MPS
- NRHP reference No.: 95001357
- Added to NRHP: November 27, 1995

Monroe Tavern, also known as McMasters Tavern, is a historic home that also served as an inn and tavern located at South Union Township, Fayette County, Pennsylvania. It was built about 1825, and is a 2 1/2-story, 5-bay, sandstone building with a center hall floor plan in an Early Republic style. It has a 2 1/2-story, kitchen ell. It served as a stop for 19th-century travelers on the National Road.

It was added to the National Register of Historic Places in 1995.
