= Uniontown Ninja =

American criminal

The Uniontown Ninja is the popular name used by a man who was seen causing mayhem in South Union Township, Pennsylvania (near Uniontown, Pennsylvania) while dressed as a ninja. The incendiary story caught national news media attention and generated 2 parody YouTube videos, later revealed to be produced by an off-duty police officer. In 2013, police announced an arrest in the case, later leading to guilty pleas on lesser charges.

== April 2011 burglaries ==
During the Easter weekend of 2011 (April 23 and 24), a series of car break-ins, up to a dozen, were reported in South Union Township, Pennsylvania. The suspect was described as a male wearing a ninja outfit and carrying a sword. The man was captured on a neighbor's surveillance camera, with the sword clearly visible. In one incident, neighbor Santino Guzzo spotted the ninja lying flat on the ground and confronted him. According to Guzzo, the ninja jumped up and announced that he had a sword and Guzzo replied: "I have a gun." The ninja attacked Guzzo in his car by sticking the sword through a window, and Guzzo grabbed it, cutting himself in the process. In another encounter with a neighbor, a woman followed the ninja in her car after seeing him breaking into cars, startling him and causing him to drop a bottle of liquor.

The ninja himself cut his hand on glass during a break-in on a vehicle, leaving a trail of blood.

== Media attention and off-duty law enforcement-produced parodies ==
The story of the "Uniontown Ninja" caught national attention, appearing on CNN.

The day after the initial burglaries, a video appeared on YouTube with a man purporting to be the Uniontown Ninja, appropriately dressed as such, demanding that police cease their investigation and demanding a case of Milwaukee's Best. Another video "Return of the Uniontown Ninja" followed on May 1. It was quickly revealed that the video was a parody created by a Pennsylvania State Trooper who was assigned to investigate the ninja case. The trooper claimed that he was merely making fun of a "stupid criminal" in his spare time and with his own equipment; he expressed hope that the video might generate some leads for the case. According to a professor emeritus in criminology from nearby Indiana University of Pennsylvania, the trooper's actions raised issues of law enforcement ethics and freedom of expression.

== 2013 arrest ==
In May 2013, police announced that a 29-year-old man who had been under investigation for an unrelated crime and told the police that he was the Uniontown Ninja. Police said that he admitted to the burglary but denied stabbing anyone, saying "I open unlocked cars." In October, the man pleaded guilty in Fayette County' mental health court to simple assault and theft from a motor vehicle, both misdemeanors. The felony and other charges were withdrawn.

== August 2023 Assault ==
On August 19, 2023, A 39-year-old man named Justin Jellots assaulted a fifteen-year-old who did not make him a sandwich. Police said on August 19 in Menallen Township, Jellots punched the teen in the face and hit his head on a wall several times because the boy did not make him a sandwich. Law enforcement said when the 15-year-old asked what his name was, the suspect said he was the "Uniontown Ninja". According to a Pennsylvania State Police report, an arrest warrant was issued for 39-year-old Justin Jellots of New Salem.
