= Hopwood Hall =

Grade II* historic house in Middleton, Greater Manchester, England

- Location within Greater Manchester
- 53.5711°N 2.1903°W
- Type: House
- Location: Middleton, Greater Manchester, England

History
- Built: c. 1426

Site notes
- Architectural styles: Mostly 17th and 18th century
- Governing body: Rochdale Council

Listed Building – Grade II*
- Official name: Hopwood Hall
- Designated: 15 March 1957
- Reference no.: 1068466

Hopwood Hall is a Grade II* listed historic house in Middleton, Greater Manchester, England, which was the ancestral country home of the landed gentry family of Hopwood who held it from the 12th century, passing to the Gregge family, originally of Bradley Hall (later Gregge-Hopwood, then after dropping the Gregge, only Hopwood) and remaining in their possession until it was closed up in 1922. The hall was sold in 1946 and, after a series of temporary residents, by the 1980s it had fallen into disrepair. Since 2018 the hall has undergone elements of restoration funded by Historic England and Rochdale Council, which owns the building. In 2017 an option agreement to acquire ownership and a limited licence to occupy was granted by the council to Hopwood DePree, an American actor who is descended from the Hopwoods through John Hopwood (1745–1802). In October 2024, the council opted not to renew the agreement with DePree, who legally challenged the decision. In 2026, DePree lost in a Manchester court, but said he would not "give up" and was discussing next steps with his legal team.

Hopwood Hall was founded as a moated site. Later the property had pleasure grounds and an extensive park with scattered woods. Features in the grounds included a kitchen garden, ice house, ha-ha, Italian garden, fountain, corn mill and small cross-shaped bower or grotto.

Hopwood Hall also gives its name to an electoral ward in the Metropolitan Borough of Rochdale and to Hopwood Hall College, a further-education college with a campus within the original estate grounds.

== History and architecture ==
The property is conjectured by historians to have been first built upon in the 12th century, possibly by Normans in the period after the Norman Conquest. It is thought there may be archaeological remains of former structures underneath the current hall. The family name Hopwood is a corruption of "Hopwode", from the Old English hop (valley among hills) + wudu (wood), and dates from when a knight was granted land between the then townships of Hopwood, Thornham, and Middleton. These estates – Hopwood, Birch, Stanleycliffe and Thornham – were owned thereafter by the family of Hopwode de Hopwode. The family is documented since before 1380, when Alain de Hopwood was mentioned. Edmund Hopwood was a magistrate and High Sheriff of Lancashire during the Commonwealth of England and a member of the Presbyterian congregation at Bury. For at least 500 years the Hopwoods were interred at the Church of St Leonard, Middleton.

Hopwood Hall is a Grade II* listed two-storey brick-and-stone manor house, built in a quadrangle around a timber-framed hall that has been dated to 1426. It is approximately 50,000 square feet (4,600 m^{2}) under the roof and the estate grounds were originally more than 5,000 acres (2,000 ha) before being parcelled out in later years. Some of the current building dates back to the early 17th century, with some late-16th-century elements. The 1830s ice house in the grounds is also listed. Hopwood Hall has been recognised for its collection of unusual intricate Jacobean stonework and wood carvings around fireplaces and doors. One carving of a lion looks more like a monkey; it is believed the artist had never seen a lion and was working from a written description. A carving on the fireplace in the 'Lord Byron bedroom' is thought to be a likeness of the 14th-century Edward II of England.

By 1750 the number of staff at Hopwood Hall was greater than the entire population of Middleton, the village in which it is located. They included butlers, maids, cooks, cleaners, attendants, carriage drivers, farmers, beekeepers, blacksmiths, butchers, weavers, wood cutters, carpenters, stablehands, horsemen and ice keepers. It had its own farm, mill, brewery, buttery, cheesery and icehouse and an orangery for fresh fruit.

The two Hopwood male heirs, Edward and Robert Hopwood, were killed during World War I. Of the estimated 30 people, staff and family, who left the hall to serve in the war, only four returned. The grieving elderly parents closed up the property and moved to London in May 1922. It was put up for sale but there were no buyers. During World War II the hall was sold to the Lancashire Cotton Corporation, which manufactured military uniforms; they used it, in conjunction with Blackfriars House, to run the firm during the war years because it was a less conspicuous target for German bombers than a factory in Manchester.

After the war, in 1946, the hall was sold to a trust and became part of De La Salle College, a Roman Catholic teacher-training college. On part of the estate grounds the De La Salle Brothers built a concrete chapel (1964–65) designed by Frederick Gibberd (the architect of Liverpool Metropolitan Cathedral), now deconsecrated but a listed building. It has been retained for use by Hopwood Hall College as the Milnrow Building.

In 1957 the hall was declared a building of historic interest. For a period the monks made the basement into a bar and music venue for area college students, to raise revenue for upkeep of the hall; graffiti that reads "Get down and boogie" is still visible on a wall. Bands that played there included Black Sabbath, UB40 and Madness. John Lennon reportedly came there once from Manchester to help a friend's band. In 1989 the Catholic college closed and Rochdale Metropolitan Borough Council (RMBC) bought the estate in the 1990s. A community college, Hopwood Hall College, was built in the grounds in 1992. Queen Elizabeth came for the opening but the hall itself was vacated and fenced off, with only a caretaker to watch over it.

=== Restoration process ===
RMBC did not have the resources to renovate nor properly maintain the hall, and in 1998 Historic England placed it on its Heritage at Risk Register. In 2017 the property was 5 to 10 years away from being largely unsalvageable - dry-rotted wood was the norm, water seeped from the walls and roof, floors laid bare to earth, windows were missing, a tree grew from the chimney, buildings had been vandalised.

In September 2017, the American actor and entrepreneur Hopwood DePree signed a licence to occupy for Hopwood Hall, which allowed for some filming. DePree became interested in the property after researching his family history online and coming to visit; RMBC verified his family connection through American Revolutionary War-era civil servant John Hopwood and based on that connection, offered him an opportunity to buy it under conditions that he properly restore and maintain it, at which point he would become the new owner. DePree said, "I don't think any of this would have happened without that connection." DePree, who had been living in Hollywood, moved to England to pursue the restoration full time. Emergency work to make the building structurally sound and waterproof started in May 2018. As of June 2022 the costs of restoration were expected to total approximately £10.7 million ($13 million), and annual maintenance approximately £650,000 ($800,000), with funds raised by DePree, the council and other sources. DePree published a book called Downton Shabby documenting the restoration process. DePree received planning permission for the restoration that year.

==== Legal battles ====
In 2024 after £1.7 million in grants from RMBC and heritage organisations such as Historic England had been spent on restoration and the agreement with DePree had expired, the property owners, RMBC, chose not to renew the agreement. They said DePree had failed to produce a viable plan for the future of the building. In early November, he was issued with an order to vacate the building while RMBC explored other options for raising funds for restoration. In September 2025, DePree filed a lawsuit against RMBC in the High Court of Justice over the council's failure to uphold its end of the option agreement. The hearing was heard at the Manchester Civil Justice Centre on 28 and 29 September 2026 with the judge ruling that DePree had not met the terms of the agreement with Rochdale Council and was therefore not entitled to purchase the hall for a nominal sum. DePree said he was "not giving up" and discussing next legal steps.

=== Famous guests ===
The poet George Gordon Byron, 6th Lord Byron (1788–1824) stayed with the Gregge-Hopwood family at Hopwood Hall from the end of September 1811 for around 10 days. He had come to try to sell parts of the Byron family estate in Rochdale, a complex deal that was not to be completed in his lifetime. The 23-year-old poet probably spent his days at the hall revising the draft of his ground-breaking poem Childe Harold's Pilgrimage. In appreciation of the success of the poem Byron gave the Hopwood Family an extravagant fireplace dated 1658, which remains in the hall today.

Guy Fawkes visited the hall in search of funding while organising his so-called Gunpowder Plot in 1605.

== See also ==
- Grade II* listed buildings in Greater Manchester
- Listed buildings in Middleton, Greater Manchester
