= Hopwood-Miller Tavern =

Historic house in Pennsylvania, US

- U.S. National Register of Historic Places
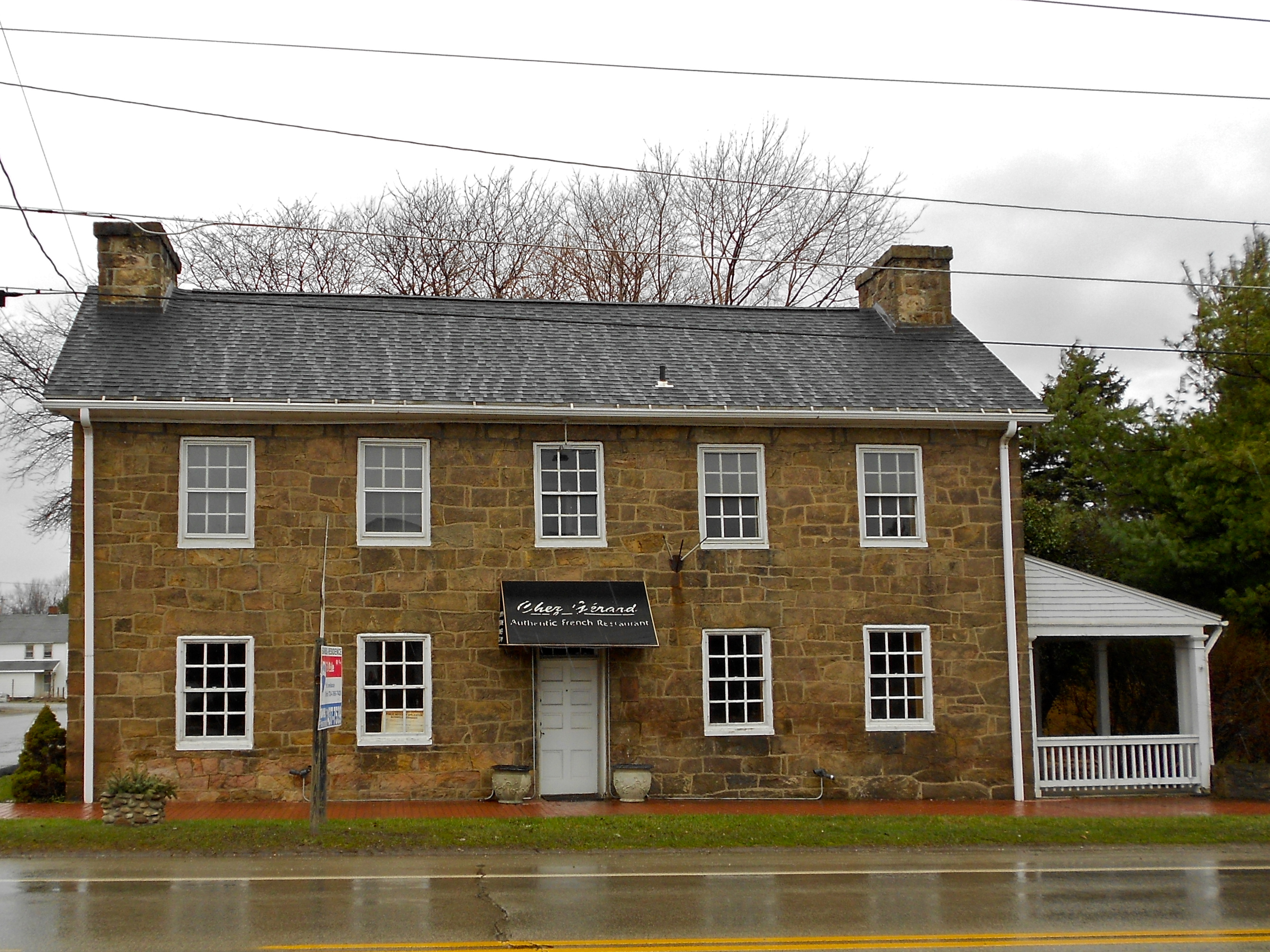

- Location within Pennsylvania Location within the United States
- Location: U.S. Route 40 (Main Street) in Hopwood, South Union Township, Pennsylvania
- Coordinates: 39°52′37.6″N 79°42′06.9″W
- Area: less than one acre
- Built: c. 1816
- Architectural style: Federal
- MPS: National Road in Pennsylvania MPS
- NRHP reference No.: 95001355
- Added to NRHP: November 27, 1995

The Hopwood-Miller Tavern is an historic home that also served as an inn and tavern. It is located in the village of Hopwood, South Union Township, Fayette County, Pennsylvania, United States.

It was added to the National Register of Historic Places in 1995.

== History and architectural features ==
Built circa 1816, this historic structure is a 2 1/2-story, five-bay, stone building with a center hall floor plan. It was designed in a vernacular Federal style, and has a 1 1/2-story, rear kitchen ell. Also located on the property is a stone spring house.

This tavern served as a stop for nineteenth-century travelers on the National Road.
