= Jennifer Milmore =

American actress

- Born: Rumson, New Jersey, U.S.
- Occupation: Actress
- Years active: 1991–present

Jennifer Milmore is an American actress best known for her role as Carrie on the sitcom Jesse.

Milmore appeared in the feature film To Wong Foo, Thanks for Everything! Julie Newmar (1995). She also played the part of Paige in the 2000 film North Beach.

In addition to her stint on Jesse, Milmore played roles in several other American network television series, including the role of Lauren in two episodes of Friends (1997). The same year, she played the role of a waitress in the pilot for sitcom Veronica's Closet.

Milmore has also appeared on 21 Jump Street (1991), Strong Medicine (2002), and Yes, Dear (2003).
