= Hopwood, Pennsylvania =

Unincorporated community in Pennsylvania, US

- Census-designated place
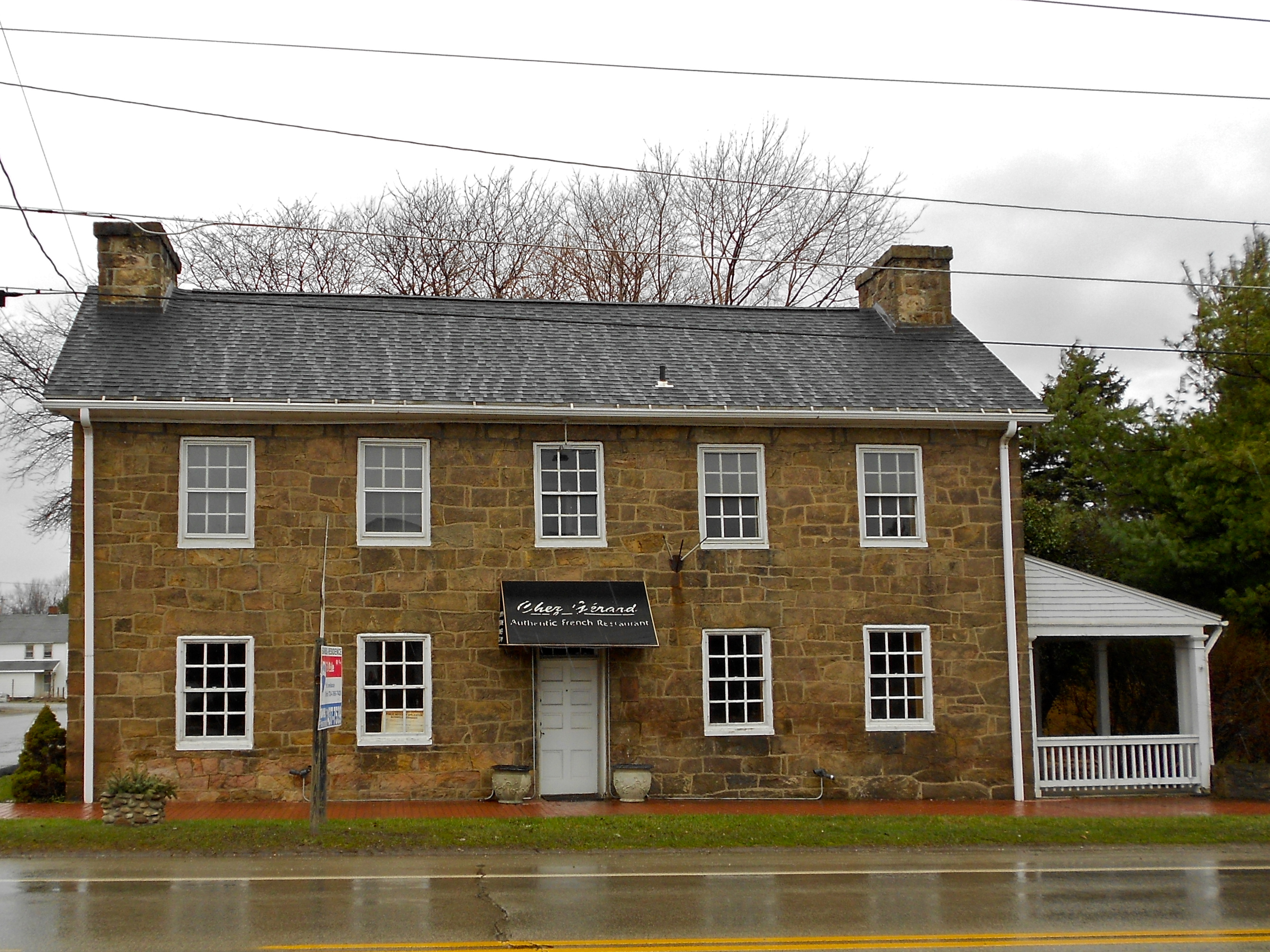
- The Hopwood-Miller Tavern
- Etymology: John Hopwood
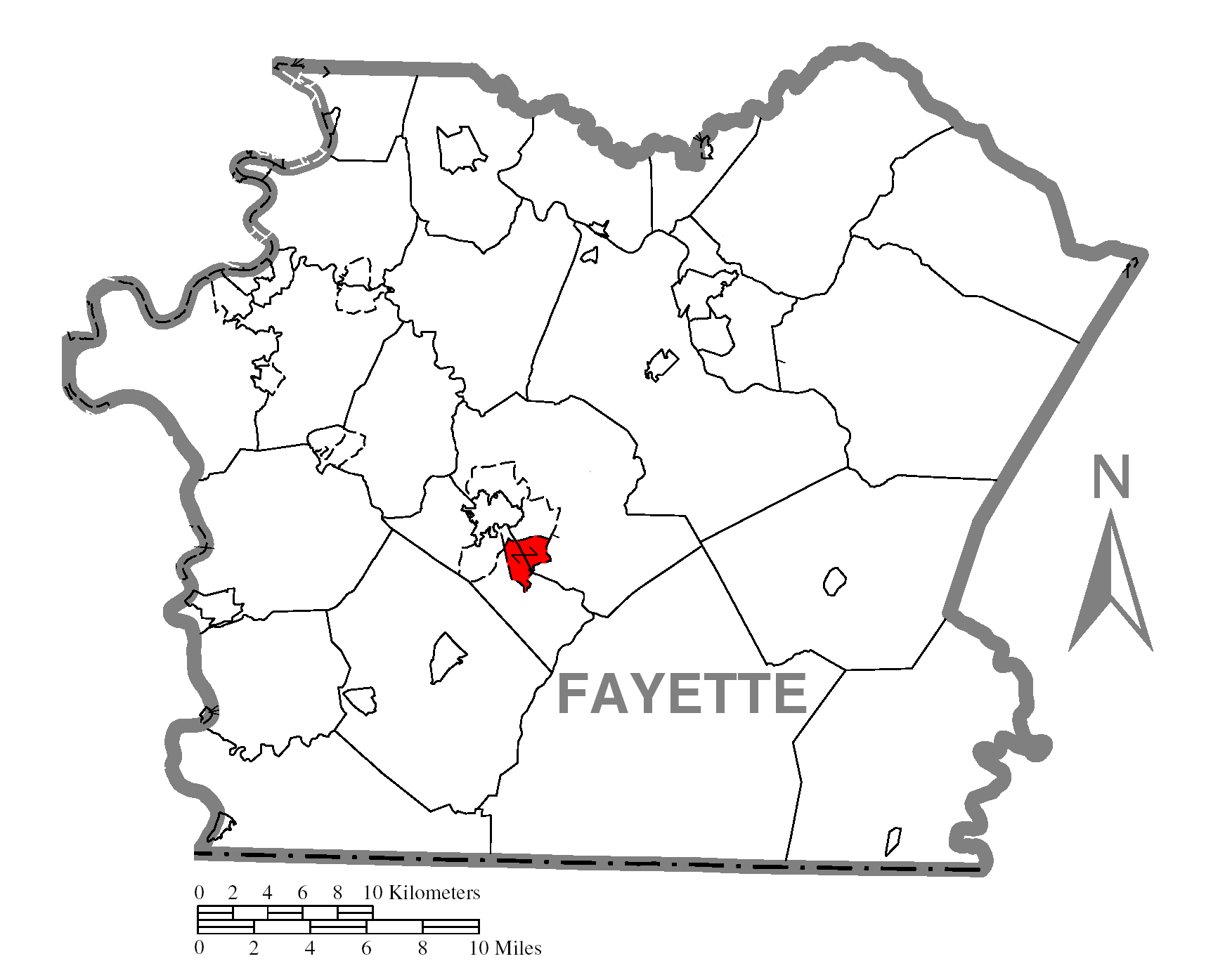
- Location of Hopwood in Fayette County
- Coordinates: 39°52′57″N 79°42′12″W
- Country: United States
- State: Pennsylvania
- County: Fayette
- Townships: North Union, South Union

Area
  - Total: 1.88 sq mi (4.88 km^{2})
  - Land: 1.88 sq mi (4.88 km^{2})
  - Water: 0 sq mi (0.00 km^{2})

Population (2020)
  - Total: 2,062
  - Density: 1,093.5/sq mi (422.21/km^{2})
- Time zone: UTC-4 (EST)
  - Summer (DST): UTC-5 (EDT)
- ZIP code: 15445
- Area code: 724
- FIPS code: 42-35728

Hopwood is a census-designated place (CDP) in Fayette County, Pennsylvania, United States. The population was 2,090 at the 2010 census, up from 2,006 at the 2000 census. It is located in North Union and South Union townships. The village was named after John Hopwood.

== History ==
The village was named after John Hopwood, a Baptist preacher. For a time, the village was renamed as Monroe.

The Battle of Jumonville Glen, a skirmish which helped to start the French and Indian War, was fought near Hopwood on May 28, 1754.

Hopwood was home to the famous Uniontown Speedway from 1916 through the mid-1920s. The Universal Trophy and Autumn Classic, 1921 AAA Championship Car season national championship points races, were held there in 1921 and 1922. Before the sport was banned, In 1914 and 1915, hill-climb races were held up the nearby Summit Mountain.

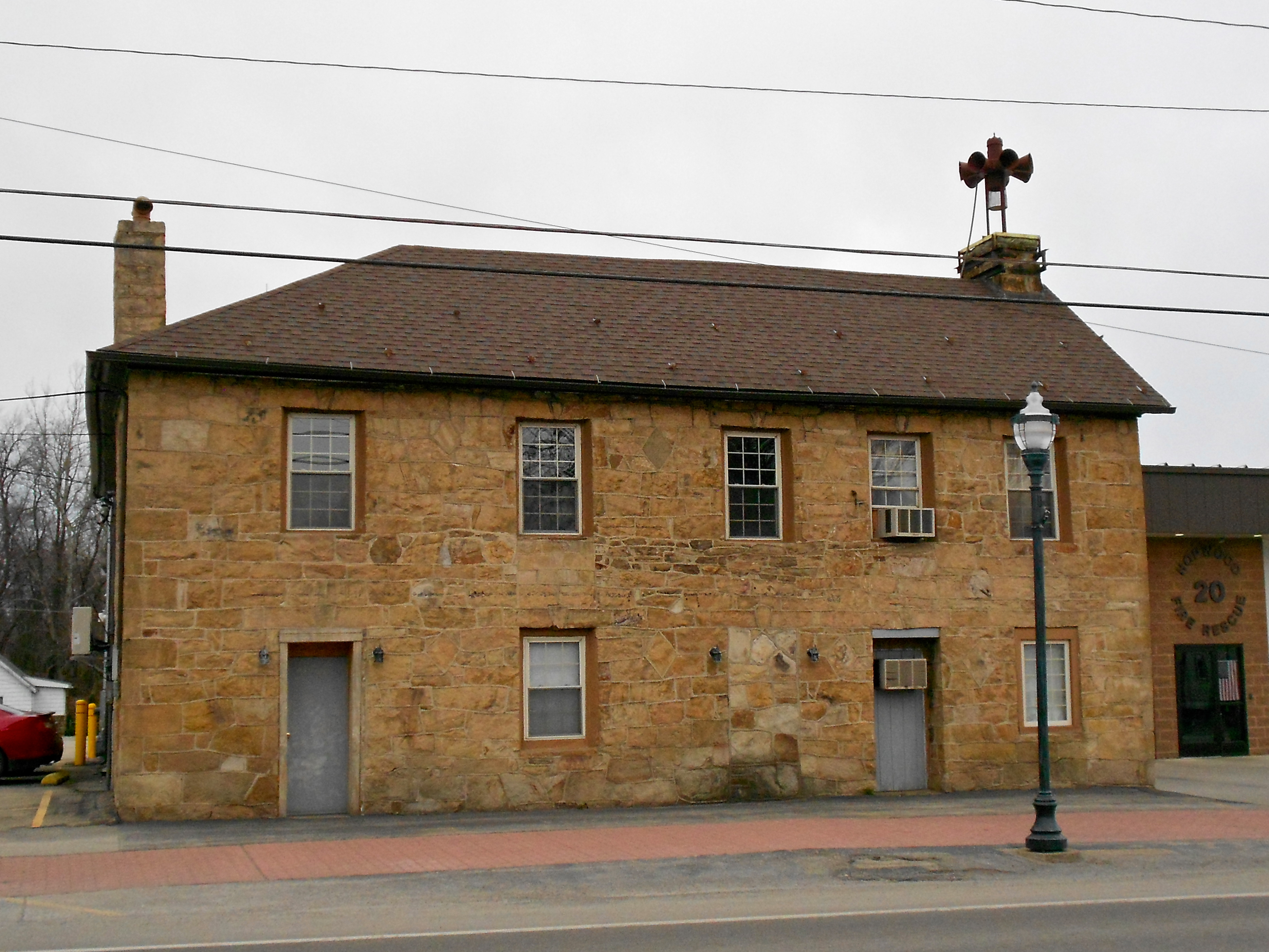
Morris Hair Tavern

Hopwood has the most early-American 19th century stone buildings along the National Pike/Old U.S. Route 40, with a number of them being on the National Register of Historic Places. In 1816 President Monroe was a guest at the Hopwood-Miller Tavern, then known as the Moses Hopwood House. Other Presidents and notables stayed there when the building was operated as an inn including John Quincy Adams, William Henry Harrison, James Polk and James Buchanan. Other important buildings include the Barnes Estate, the Summit Inn, and the former Soldiers Orphan's School, a post-Civil War orphan school which is the current property of the Jumonville Camp & Retreat Center.

== Geography ==
Hopwood is located in central Fayette County at 39°52′27″N 79°42′12″W (39.874145, −79.703385). It is bordered to the north by East Uniontown. U.S. Route 40 Business (National Pike) runs through the center of Hopwood and forms the border between North and South Union townships. The center of Uniontown is 2 miles (3 km) to the northwest via National Pike. U.S. Route 40 forms a four-lane bypass around the south side of Uniontown, intersecting National Pike at the south end of Hopwood. Via US 40, it is 60 miles (97 km) southeast to Cumberland, Maryland, and 45 miles (72 km) northwest to Washington.

According to the United States Census Bureau, the Hopwood CDP has a total area of 1.89 square miles (4.89 km^{2}), all land. The community sits at the western base of Chestnut Ridge, the westernmost ridge of the Allegheny Mountains in this area.

== Demographics ==
Historical population
Census	Pop.	Note	%±
2020	2,062		—
U.S. Decennial Census

As of the 2000 census, there were 2,006 people, 893 households, and 584 families residing in the CDP. The population density was 1,070.8 inhabitants per square mile (413.4/km^{2}). There were 932 housing units at an average density of 497.5 per square mile (192.1/km^{2}). The racial makeup of the CDP was 98.60% White, 0.60% African American, 0.10% Native American, 0.25% Asian, 0.05% Pacific Islander, 0.10% from other races, and 0.30% from two or more races. Hispanic or Latino of any race were 0.25% of the population.

There were 893 households, out of which 23.7% had children under the age of 18 living with them, 52.6% were married couples living together, 9.7% had a female householder with no husband present, and 34.6% were non-families. 31.1% of all households were made up of individuals, and 14.4% had someone living alone who was 65 years of age or older. The average household size was 2.25 and the average family size was 2.81.

In the CDP, the population was spread out, with 19.5% under the age of 18, 6.5% from 18 to 24, 25.3% from 25 to 44, 27.6% from 45 to 64, and 21.1% who were 65 years of age or older. The median age was 44 years. For every 100 females, there were 95.3 males. For every 100 females age 18 and over, there were 89.6 males.

The median income for a household in the CDP was $30,223, and the median income for a family was $41,111. Males had a median income of $38,594 versus $19,643 for females. The per capita income for the CDP was $17,194. About 8.0% of families and 13.4% of the population were below the poverty line, including 22.5% of those under age 18 and 7.4% of those age 65 or over.

== Notable people ==
- William DeFord (1807–1898), member of the Ohio House of Representatives
