= South Union Township, Pennsylvania =

Township in Pennsylvania, US

Coordinates: 39°52′00″N 79°41′59″W

South Union Township
- Township
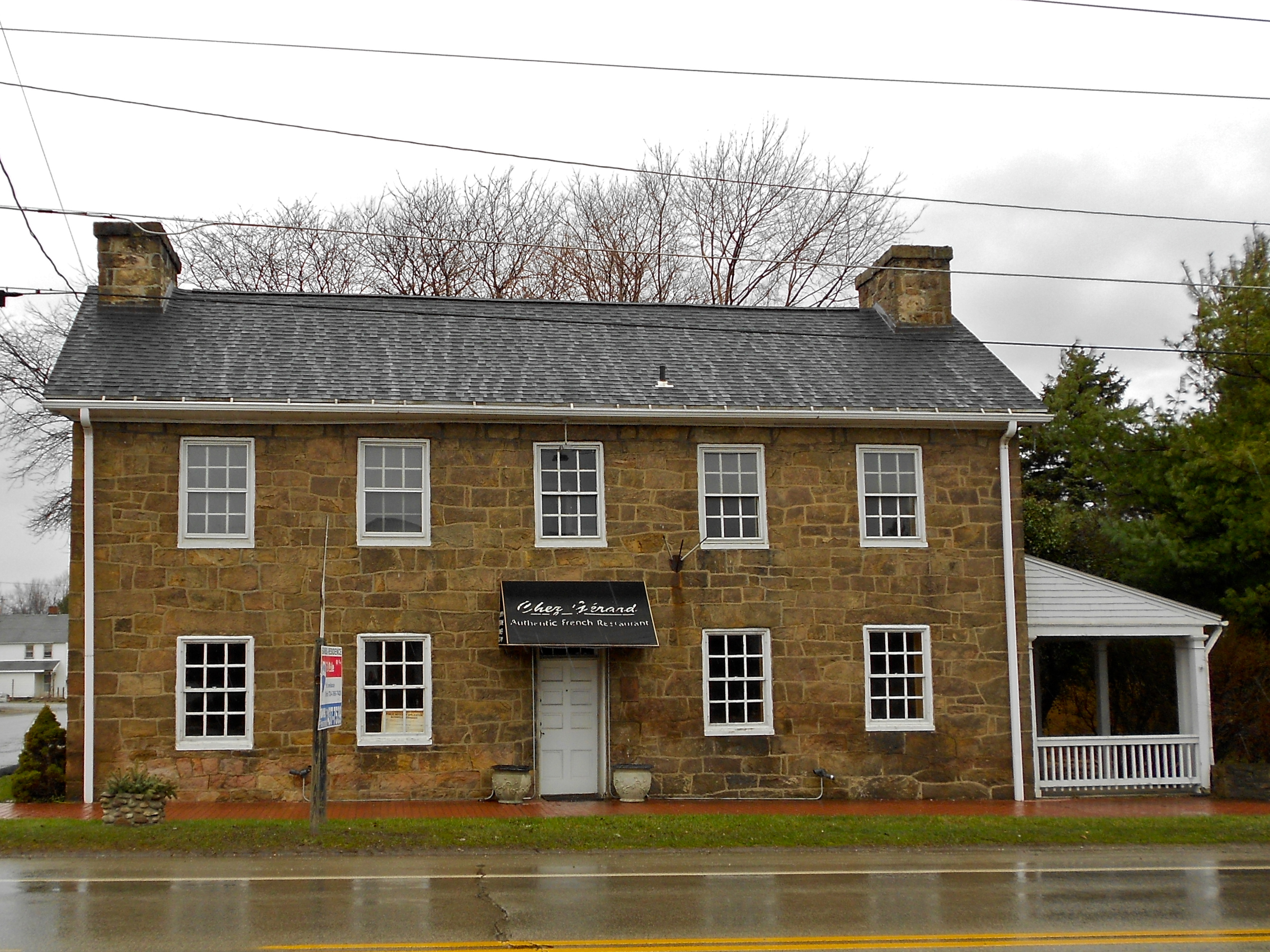
- The Hopwood-Miller Tavern at Hopwood

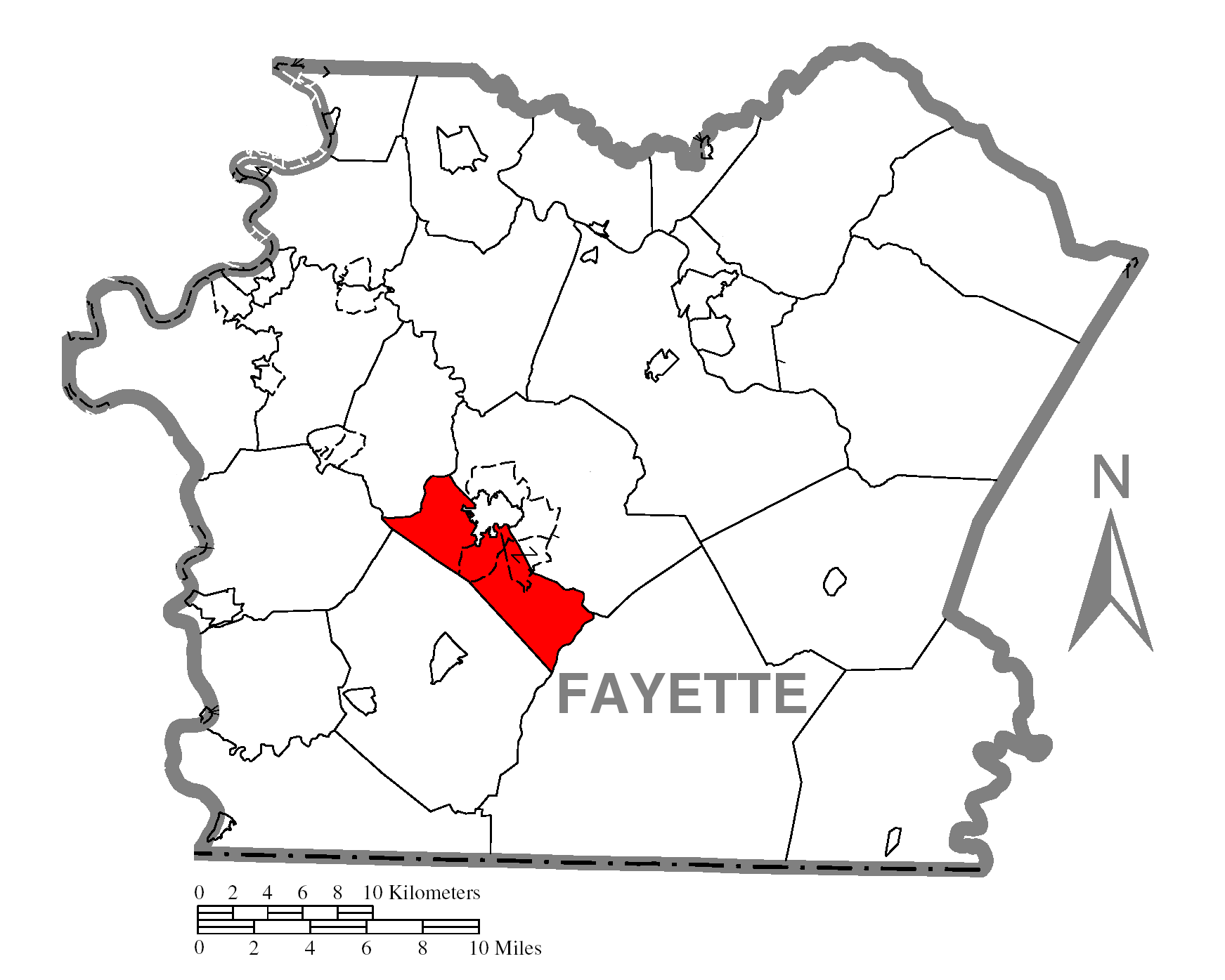
- Location of South Union Township in Fayette County

- Location of Fayette County in Pennsylvania
- Country: United States
- State: Pennsylvania
- County: Fayette

Area
  - Total: 16.80 sq mi (43.50 km^{2})
  - Land: 16.76 sq mi (43.41 km^{2})
  - Water: 0.035 sq mi (0.09 km^{2})

Population (2020)
  - Total: 10,897 ▲
  - Estimate (2022): 10,622
  - Density: 630.9/sq mi (243.59/km^{2})
- Time zone: UTC-4 (EST)
  - Summer (DST): UTC-5 (EDT)
- Area code: 724
- FIPS code: 42-051-72544
- Website: www.southuniontwp.com

South Union Township is a township in Fayette County, Pennsylvania, United States. The population was 10,897 at the 2020 census, an increase over the figure of 10,681 tabulated in 2010.

Communities within the township include Hatfield, Hutchinson, Chadville, South Uniontown, Leith, Revere, and parts of East Uniontown and Hopwood.

South Union Township contains the larger two of the three Uniontown area shopping districts. The largest, centered on the Uniontown Mall, is located just outside the Uniontown city limits. Another important shopping area is called Walnut Hill and is located in Hatfield. The Laurel Highlands School District serves this township.

== History ==
South Union Township was formed from Union Township in 1851.

Union Township was created in 1783, one of Fayette County's original townships. The borough of Uniontown was taken from it in 1796, and a part of Wharton Township was added to it in 1802. In 1851, Union Township was split along the National Road into North Union and South Union townships.

The Hopwood-Miller Tavern, Thomas Gaddis Homestead, Morris-Hair Tavern, Monroe Tavern, and Summit Hotel are listed on the National Register of Historic Places.

== Geography ==
South Union Township is located south of the center of Fayette County. It is bordered to the north by North Union Township and the city of Uniontown, the county seat. U.S. Route 40, following the National Road, forms the border with North Union Township. A newer section of US 40 bypasses Uniontown to the south (passing through South Union Township), while the National Road continues through the center of Uniontown. U.S. Route 119 bypasses Uniontown to the west, with four exits in South Union Township. US 40 leads southeast to Cumberland, Maryland, and northwest to Washington, while US 119 leads northeast to Connellsville and southwest to Morgantown, West Virginia.

According to the United States Census Bureau, the township has a total area of 16.8 square miles (43.5 km^{2}), of which 0.03 square miles (0.09 km^{2}), or 0.20%, is water.

== Demographics ==
Historical population
| Census | Pop. | Note | %± |
|---|---|---|---|
| 2010 | 10,681 | | — |
| 2020 | 10,897 | | 2.0% |
| 2022 (est.) | 10,622 | | −2.5% |
U.S. Decennial Census

As of the 2000 census, there were 11,337 people, 4,563 households, and 3,194 families residing in the township. The population density was 677.4 inhabitants per square mile (261.5/km^{2}). There were 4,795 housing units at an average density of 286.5 per square mile (110.6/km^{2}). The racial makeup of the township was 94.89% White, 3.27% African American, 0.07% Native American, 0.84% Asian, 0.01% Pacific Islander, 0.11% from other races, and 0.81% from two or more races. Hispanics or Latinos of any race were 0.33% of the population.

There were 4,563 households, out of which 29.3% had children under the age of 18 living with them, 54.0% were married couples living together, 12.8% had a female householder with no husband present, and 30.0% were non-families. 27.4% of all households were made up of individuals, and 15.8% had someone living alone who was 65 years of age or older. The average household size was 2.41, and the average family size was 2.93.

In the township the population was spread out, with 22.6% under the age of 18, 6.5% from 18 to 24, 24.4% from 25 to 44, 25.0% from 45 to 64, and 21.6% who were 65 years of age or older. The median age was 43 years. For every 100 females, there were 85.1 males. For every 100 females age 18 and over, there were 79.6 males.

The median income for a household in the township was $33,808, and the median income for a family was $46,073. Males had a median income of $39,000 versus $22,753 for females. The per capita income for the township was $19,905. About 9.4% of families and 12.6% of the population were below the poverty line, including 17.4% of those under age 18 and 11.1% of those age 65 or over.

== See also ==
- Uniontown Ninja
