= Lemont Furnace, Pennsylvania =

Unincorporated community in Pennsylvania, US

- Census-designated place
- Location within Pennsylvania Location within the United States
- Coordinates: 39°54′51″N 79°40′11″W
- Country: United States
- State: Pennsylvania
- County: Fayette
- Township: North Union

Area
  - Total: 1.03 sq mi (2.68 km^{2})
  - Land: 1.03 sq mi (2.66 km^{2})
  - Water: 0.0077 sq mi (0.02 km^{2})
- Elevation: 1,050 ft (320 m)

Population (2020)
  - Total: 715
  - Density: 695.2/sq mi (268.42/km^{2})
- Time zone: UTC-5 (Eastern (EST))
  - Summer (DST): UTC-4 (EDT)
- ZIP code: 15456
- FIPS code: 42-42640
- GNIS feature ID: 1179192

Lemont Furnace is an unincorporated community and census-designated place in North Union Township, Fayette County, Pennsylvania, United States. It is located 3 miles (5 km) northeast of the city of Uniontown and approximately 60 miles (97 km) southeast of Pittsburgh. The community is part of the Pittsburgh metropolitan area. At the 2010 census, the population of Lemont Furnace was 827.

Penn State Fayette, The Eberly Campus, a Commonwealth Campus of the Pennsylvania State University system, is located 2 miles (3 km) north of Lemont Furnace. The campus serves the students of Fayette, Greene, Somerset, Washington, and Westmoreland counties in southwestern Pennsylvania.

== Demographics ==
Historical population
Census	Pop.	Note	%±
2020	715		—
U.S. Decennial Census

The 2020 United States census gave the population as 715 people.
