= Penn State Fayette =

Commonwealth campus

Coordinates: 39.946686°N 79.658114°W

Penn State Fayette, The Eberly Campus
- Type: Public satellite campus
- Established: 1965
- Parent institution: Pennsylvania State University
- Affiliations: PSUAC (USCAA)
- Chancellor: W. Charles Patrick
- President: Neeli Bendapudi
- Faculty: 50
- Students: 352 (Fall 2025)
- Undergraduates: 352 (Fall 2025)
- Location: Lemont Furnace, Pennsylvania, U.S.
- Colors: Navy Blue and White
- Mascot: Nittany Lion
- Website: fayette.psu.edu

Penn State Fayette, The Eberly Campus is a commonwealth campus of the Pennsylvania State University and located in Lemont Furnace, Pennsylvania. The campus serves students from the southwestern corner of Pennsylvania covering a five-county area that includes all or parts of Fayette, Greene, Somerset, Washington, and Westmoreland counties. The campus also enrolls students from other states and maintains a small international student population. Students at Penn State Fayette can complete the first two years of most of majors available in the Penn State system along with the entirety of six bachelor's degree and eight associate degree programs. In May 2025, Penn State officials that the campus will close after the spring 2027 semester, citing low enrollment and financial losses.

== History ==
Penn State founded an education center in the area in 1934, as part of an initiative to provide localized learning facilities that could grant associate degrees or allow students to complete the first two years of a bachelor's degree without the expense of living in University Park. However, the center was closed in the 1940s due to World War II. In the 1950s, the commonwealth campus system was established and local branch campuses, each fully integrated into the Penn State system, were established across the state. Fayette Campus opened in 1965. It was first housed in rented space in downtown Uniontown before relocating to its current site three years later.

In 2004, the campus was named for Robert E. Eberly, a wealthy Pittsburgh natural gas speculator who endowed his fortune to Western Pennsylvania higher education.

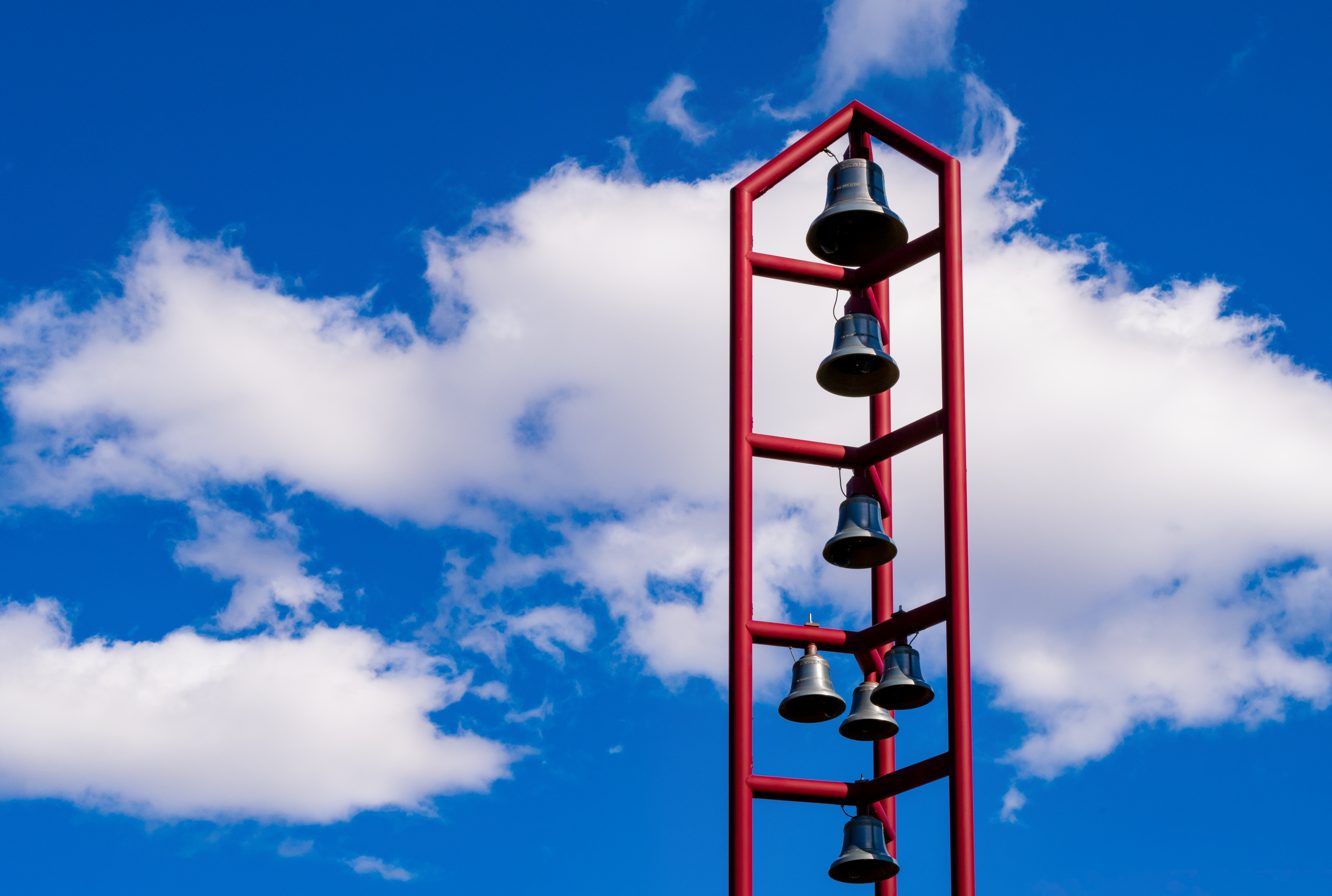
Penn State Fayette's carillon tower

Penn State Fayette's carillon tower was erected as part of the institution's 40th anniversary celebration. It has 19 bells cast in France and integrated with U.S. electronic technology. This $180,000 project was funded by donors, each contributing $10,000 for a bell bearing their name.

=== Closure ===
On May 22, 2025 the Board of Trustees of Pennsylvania State University announced the closure of seven of its twenty regional Commonwealth campuses, including Penn State Fayette. Enrollment had dropped to 407 students as of Fall 2024, a 64% decline from its peak and a drop of 43% in the past ten years. There were 4 other colleges within 30 miles (48 km) of the campus, which only had commuter students. In fiscal 2024, financial losses for campus were $3.8 million, and the campus had $29.0 million in deferred maintenance (or $71,000 per student). Penn State Fayette will close after the Spring 2027 semester. Current students, faculty and staff will be offered support as the campus transitions to closure over a two-year period.

== Academics ==
Undergraduate demographics as of Fall 2023
Race and ethnicity	Total
White	89%
Black	4%
Hispanic	3%
Two or more races	2%
Asian	1%
Economic diversity
Low-income (Note: The percentage of students who received an income-based federal Pell grant intended for low-income students.)	35%
Affluent (Note: The percentage of students who are a part of the American middle class at the bare minimum.)	65%

Class sizes average between 20 and 25 students and the largest classes on campus are typically no larger than 60 to 75 students. Students at Penn State Fayette can complete the first two years of nearly all 160+ majors offered throughout the Penn State system.

== Student life ==
The Office of Student Life provides a multitude of activities for students, including community service initiatives, novelty activities, leadership and educational opportunities, social events, and cultural programming. Students can also choose from more than 20 student-run clubs and organizations.

== Athletics ==
Penn State Fayette teams participate as a member of the United States Collegiate Athletic Association (USCAA). The Roaring Lions are a member of the Pennsylvania State University Athletic Conference (PSUAC). Men's sports include baseball, basketball, cross country and wrestling while women's sports include basketball, cross country, softball and volleyball.
