= Hopwood DePree =

American actor

Hopwood DePree (born February 1970) is an American-British writer, actor, director and producer. He is best known for his renovation efforts of Hopwood Hall in Middleton, Greater Manchester, England.

== Biography ==
DePree was born and grew up in Holland, Michigan. He is the son of Thomas DePree and Deanna (née Black), and has two siblings. DePree's father was a politician (Republican), political advisor and the founder of a local insurance company. It is through his mother that he has Hopwood ancestry and was given the first name of Hopwood. DePree’s branch of the Hopwood family settled in the US in the 1700s, from England. The Hopwood surname changed to a first or middle name when Alcinda Hopwood married Newton Black in the late 19th century, and the male descendants were given the first or middle name of Hopwood. Growing up, DePree did not like his unusual first name and chose to use the name Tod before reverting to his birth name. His first acting, writing and directing credits are as Tod DePree.

After graduating from Holland High School (Michigan), DePree moved to Los Angeles where he attended the University of Southern California, before becoming an actor, writer, director and producer.

DePree was born in the United States. In 2025, in a BBC article, he claimed to have obtained a British citizenship.

== Hopwood Hall ==
Hopwood Hall is a Grade II* listed historic house in Middleton, Greater Manchester. The house, now surrounded by a training college of the same name, is largely made up of the 17th and 18th century components but incorporates parts of an early 16th century open-hall timber-framed structure and various 19th and 20th century additions and alterations. The first iteration of the hall is thought to have been in the 12th century, possibly by Normans in the period after the Norman Conquest. It is approximately 50,000 square feet (4,600 m²) under the roof, and the estate grounds were originally more than 5,000 acres (2,000 ha), but are now reduced to just the building and its immediate surrounding grounds.

DePree discovered the hall while researching his family tree on the internet. He then contacted the local Council, Rochdale Borough Council (RBC), the current owners of the hall, to find out more about it, before visiting it in 2014, where he saw it was in a dilapidated state, close to collapse. In 2017, DePree moved from Hollywood to England with the intention of restoring the hall. That year, he signed an exclusive agreement with the council and English Heritage, for up to five years, to put together a workable plan for the renovations. He envisioned renovating it into a 25-bedroom hotel, outdoor cinema, giftshop and heritage trail. Estimate costs, according to DePree, to do so are over £10m. DePree began chronicling the renovation process of Hopwood Hall Estate with videos on his YouTube channel.

Between 2017 and 2024, the council spent £557,000 for essential repairs, with almost £1m more contributed by Historic England. DePree claims he contributed his own money to the project: a total of £581,000 by 2024 and by 2025 that total had increased to £750,000. By 2022, one wing was stabilised to prevent its collapse and a new slate roof was added, but there were still major structural issues in the interior, such as missing sections of ceilings or floors. DePree has been supported in his renovation work by volunteers, some of whom have found the work to help with their well-being and mental health.

At the end of October 2024, RBC opted not to renew their agreement with DePree, after seven years and four renewals because, they asserted, the conditions of the agreement had yet to be met. The decision came after the council's cabinet commissioned consultants to determine the viability of DePree's plans for the hall. The consultants determined the plans were "unlikely to be able to secure future public or private funding". RBC council leader, Neil Emmott, commenting on the decision said, "Public assets are owned by our residents and we cannot allow them to transfer to a private individual without a great deal of care".

By December 2024, 4000 people had signed a petition asking the council to let DePree and his volunteers resume their work on the hall. In September 2025, Hopwood DePree filed a lawsuit against RBC in the High Court of Justice. DePree asserted that he upheld his end of the agreement, and the council had failed to uphold theirs. The two-day High Court trial is scheduled for 29-30 September 2026.

== Other Accomplishments ==
In 1999, he co-founded the Waterfront Film Festival, held in the beach resort area of West Michigan.

He founded Tictock Studios in 2006. In 2009, Tictock Studios developed a training program, targeted at below-the-line workers, to get new crew members ready for work in Michigan.

In 2008, DePree was appointed by Governor Jennifer M. Granholm to the Michigan Film Office Advisory Council to represent broad areas of film and motion picture making, production of television programs, and commercials, and related industries in Michigan.

He was a Trustee of UK's Heritage Trust Network for six years, from 2018 to 2024.

In 2019, he created a multimedia stand-up comedy show called The Yank is a Manc! My Ancestors and Me, which he toured in Brighton, Manchester, London and Edinburgh.

His book, Downton Shabby: One American's Ultimate DIY Adventure Restoring His Family's English Castle, is a memoir about his restoration work on the English estate, published by Morrow in 2022.

== Filmography ==
Year	Title	Medium	Role			
Year	Title	Medium	Director	Producer	Writer	Actor
1993	Doogie Howser, M.D. Season 4 Episode 21 (as Tod DePree)	TV Show	No	No	No	Yes
1995	Rhinoskin: The Making of a Movie Star (as Tod DePree)	Film	Yes	No	Yes	No
1999	The Last Big Attraction	Film	Yes	No	Yes	Yes
2000	North Beach	Film	No	No	No	Yes
2000	Dear Doughboy	TV Movie	No	Yes	Yes	Yes
2004	Gordo's Road Show	TV Movie	Yes	No	Yes	No
2004	Helter Skelter	TV Movie	No	No	No	Yes
2010	Tug	Film	No	Yes	No	No
2010	Virginia	Film	No	Yes	No	No
