= William DeFord =

American politician (1807–1898)

Member of the Ohio House of Representatives from the Carroll County district
- In office 1864–1868
- Preceded by: Leonard Harsh
- Succeeded by: James M. Kain

Personal details
- Born: April 28, 1807 Monroe, Fayette County, Pennsylvania, U.S.
- Died: February 24, 1898 (aged 91) near East Rochester, Ohio, U.S.
- Party: Democratic; Republican
- Spouse: Mary Williams (m. 1838; died 1875)
- Relatives: John Hopwood (grandfather)
- Education: Madison College
- Occupation: Politician; farmer

William DeFord (April 28, 1807 – February 24, 1898) was an American politician who served as a member of the Ohio House of Representatives, representing Carroll County from 1864 to 1868.

== Early life ==
William DeFord was born on April 28, 1807, in Monroe, Fayette County, Pennsylvania, to Nancy (née Hopwood) and John DeFord. His father was a farmer and owned a hotel in Monroe (previously named Hopwood). His maternal grandfather John Hopwood was the town namesake and was a Baptist who founded churches throughout Fayette County. DeFord studied in common schools and attended Madison College in Pennsylvania for a few months. In 1822, he visited some friends in Wooster, Ohio. As a young man, he helped construct the National Road near Laurel Hill. He also met General Marquis de Lafayette during his return to the United States.

== Career ==
In 1835, DeFord moved to a farm in Washington Township, Carroll County, Ohio.

Prior to the Civil War, DeFord was a Democrat. In 1840, DeFord was a presidential elector for the Democratic ticket. After the start of the war, he became a Republican. He served as a member of the Ohio House of Representatives, representing Carroll County from 1864 to 1868. He also served as justice of the peace.

DeFord worked as a farmer for over 57 years.

== Personal life ==
DeFord married Mary Williams, daughter of George Williams, of New Jersey in April 1838. They had two sons, Nathan and John. She died in 1875. DeFord was a member of the Methodist Protestant Church.

DeFord died on February 24, 1898, at his son's home near East Rochester, Ohio.
