= Historic Summit Inn Resort =

- Summit Hotel
- U.S. National Register of Historic Places
- U.S. Historic district
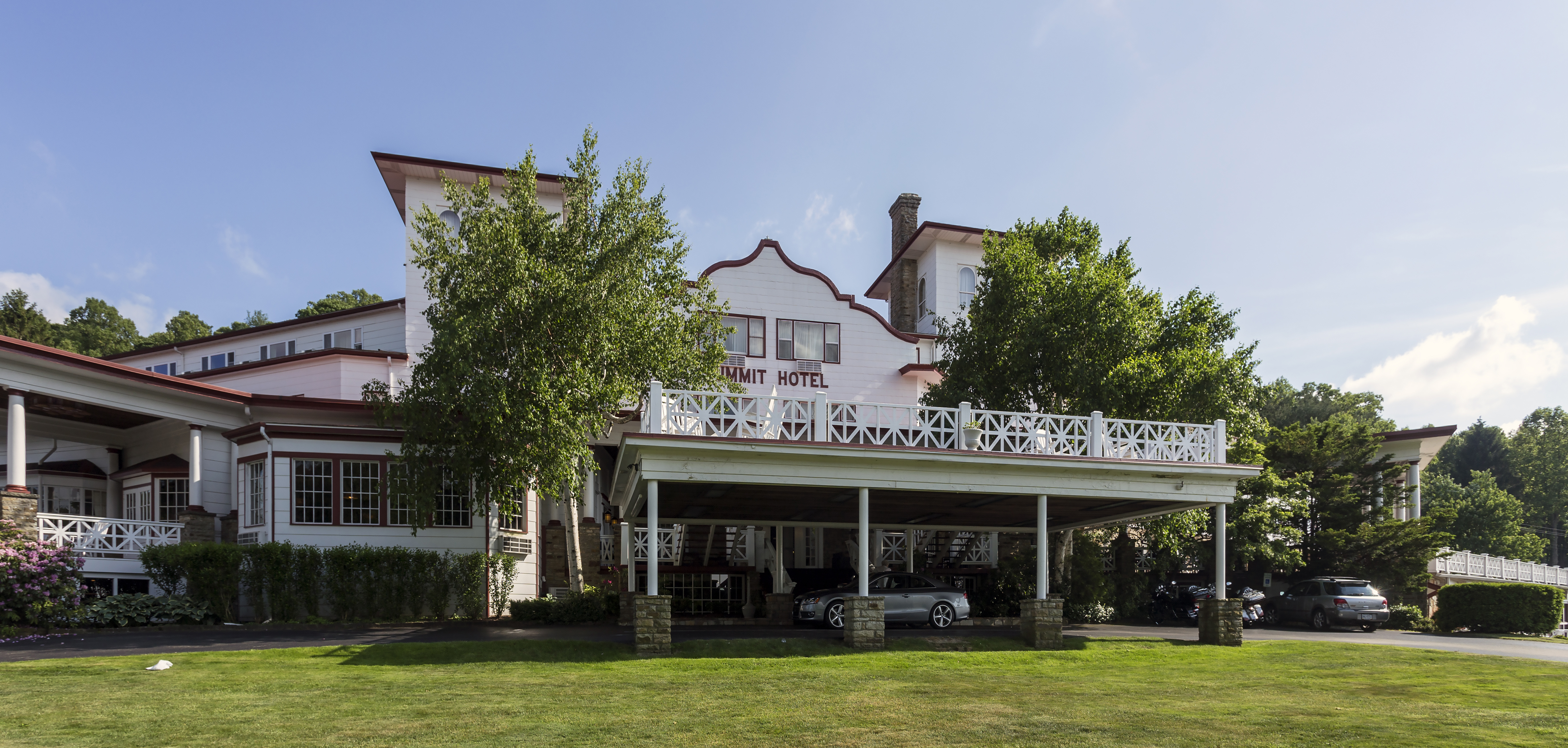
- Summit Hotel, June 2015

- Location within Pennsylvania Location within the United States
- Location: 101 Skyline Dr., Farmington, Pennsylvania
- Coordinates: 39°51′06″N 79°39′28″W
- Area: 50 acres (20 ha)
- Built: 1907
- Architect: Keirn, J. Edward
- Architectural style: Bungalow/craftsman, Mission/spanish Revival
- NRHP reference No.: 05000062
- Added to NRHP: February 15, 2005

The Historic Summit Inn Resort, also known as the Summit Hotel, is an historic hotel complex and national historic district which is located on US Route 40 and Skyline Drive atop the Summit Mountain of Chestnut Ridge by North Union Township, South Union Township and Wharton Township in Farmington, Fayette County, Pennsylvania.

It was added to the National Register of Historic Places in 2005.

== History and architectural features ==
This historic district includes eight contributing buildings and three contributing structures. The main hotel building was built in 1907, and is a three-story, stone and stucco, Mission style building. It features a parapeted gable and two four-story square towers. The building was expanded in 1923.

Also on the property are the contributing carriage house, staff dormitory, stable/garage, two cottages, an Olympic-sized swimming pool, pool house and pavilion/concession stand, which were built circa 1923, and two water storage tanks, which were erected sometime around 1907.

This historic district was added to the National Register of Historic Places in 2005.
