= Bill Adamaitis =

American football player (1915–1968)

- Adamaitis as head coach of Worcester South basketball team, 1947
- Born: January 25, 1915; Worcester County, Massachusetts, US
- Died: February 15, 1968 (aged 53); Worcester, Massachusetts, US
- Education: The Catholic University of America
- Known for: American football player

William A. Adamaitis (January 25, 1915 – February 15, 1968) was an American football player who played college and professional football from 1933 to 1937.

Adamaitis played college football for the Catholic University Cardinals from 1933 to 1936. He led the Cardinals to a victory over the Ole Miss Rebels in the 1936 Orange Bowl and became the first, and one of only three players, to catch and throw a touchdown pass in the same Orange Bowl. He was selected to play on the College All-Star team in the Chicago College All-Star Game in August 1937 and led the college all-stars in their only scoring play against the NFL champion Philadelphia Eagles.

Although he had an offer to play for the Eagles, Adamaitis opted to remain in Washington, D.C., where he played professional football for the Washington Presidents of the Dixie League. Adamaitis helped lead the Presidents to the 1937 Dixie League championship with a 5–0–2 record in conference play.

== Education ==
Adamaitis was born in 1915 in Worcester County and attended Classicial High School in Worcester, Massachusetts, where he was captain of the basketball team, a member of the football, baseball and track teams. He received a bachelor's degree from The Catholic University of America in 1937 and a master's degree from Worcester State College in 1951.

== Football ==
=== College football ===
Adamaitis played college football at the halfback position for The Catholic University of America Cardinals. During the 1933 season, he impressed observers with his passing ability, including a 30-yard completion, as he led Catholic University's frosh team to a victory over the University of Maryland's frosh team. He saw limited playing time in 1936, but became a star while playing for the varsity team during the 1935 and 1936 seasons.

==== 1935 season ====
During the 1935 season, Adamaitis was the leading scorer in the Washington District, which then included the Georgetown Hoyas, Maryland Terrapins, George Washington University and American University. In October 1935, Adamaitis's passing led the Cardinals to a 41–7 victory over a LaSalle team that had been undefeated since 1933. The Washington Post at the time noted that "Adamaitis played an important part in the slaughter by paving the way with bullet-like passes for several of the scoring jaunts."

The following week, Adamaitis was again led the Cardinals to a victory. The New York Times praised Adamaitis as the leader of the Cardinals' game-winning drive, "sprinting 36 yards to start the attack and passing to Peter Drangins for another fourteen-yard gain" before running the final three yards himself.

One week later, Adamaitis's passing led the Cardinals to a comeback victory over the University of Detroit. The Washington Post wrote that the "nonchalant halfback" completed nine passes for 158 yards, including the game-winners. The New York Times noted that, with the Cardinals trailing in the fourth quarter, Adamaitis threw a "long pass" that was caught by one player at the 12-yard, lateraled to another player at the eight-yard line, with the last player staggering across the goal line for the game-winning touchdown. The Post emphasized the accuracy of Adamaitis' passing: "He could have dotted an 'I' at 50 yards away today."

At the end of the 1935 season, The Washington Post named Adamaitis and Bill Guckeyson as the halfbacks on its All-District football team for the 1935 season. The Post cited Adamaitis's "off-tackle plunges and expert passing" for earning him a spot on the team. Spalding's Official Football Guide for 1936 also singled out Adamaitis for having "played sensational foot ball" during the 1935 season.

==== 1936 Orange Bowl ====
With a 7–2 record, the Cardinals were invited to represent the north in the 1936 Orange Bowl, one of only four bowl games in existence during the 1935 college football season. The Cardinals were matched against the Ole Miss Rebels. In the lead-up to the game, Cardinals' head coach Dutch Bergman indicated that he would rely on the passing game of Adamaitis. The Cardinals defeated the Rebels by a 21–20 score, as Adamaitis scored the first touchdown on a "smooth lateral" from the quarterback, P. J. Dranginis. Adamaitis took the lateral and "ran unmolested around the Ole Miss left end" for the touchdown." He then threw a 45-yard pass to Foley for the Cardinals' second touchdown. Bill Cuddy of the United Press International wrote: "Bill Adamaitis, Catholic's 180-pound left halfback, proved a triple threat sparkplug for the northern team and vied with Dave Bernard, Dixie quarterback, for individual honors." With his showing against Ole Miss, Adamaitis became the first, and one of only three, players to catch and throw a touchdown pass in the same Orange Bowl. He was hailed as the "hero of the Orange Bowl" by The Washington Post.

==== 1936 season ====
During the 1936 season, Adamaitis was again one of the offensive stars of the Catholic University's football team. In the opening game of the 1936 season, Adamaitis scored three touchdowns in the first quarter and was "put under wraps so he would be available for better hunting."

In a 12–6 victory over DePaul, Adamatis accounted for all of his team's points with two touchdown passes. The New York Times wrote that "the passing combination of Adamaitis to Walker" provided Catholic University with the difference against DePaul with touchdown passes in each of the first two quarters.

In August 1937, Admaitis was selected to play at the halfback position on the College All-Star team in the annual game against the NFL championship team. The Philadelphia Eagles won the game, 14–6, though Adamaitis played well against the NFL champions. In the third quarter, he led the College All-Star team to its only touchdown. Adamaitis took the ball at the All-Stars' 34-yard line, ran to the Philadelphia 35-yard line, and then lateralled to Len Barnum who scored. The Boston Globe called it a "brilliant running-lateral" play led by Adamaitis as he "broke into the clear" and then lateraled to Barnum as he was about to be tackled. The New York Times also praised Adamaitis's run against the Eagles, writing that the All-Stars "provided the biggest thrill of the night when Bill Adamaitis, formerly of Catholic University, broke through the pros' line for a gain of 21 yards and then lateraled" to Barnum who ran the rest of the way.

Adamaitis also played basketball and baseball at Catholic University and was posthumously inducted into the Catholic University Athletic Hall of Fame in 1979.

=== Professional football ===
In the fall of 1937, Adamaitis played professional football for the Washington Presidents of the Dixie League. Adamaitis had an offer to play for the Philadelphia Eagles of the National Football League but opted to remain in the Washington, D.C. area, where he had played college football. During his time with the Presidents, Adamaitis was known as "a real triple-threat man" for his skills in running, passing, and kicking.

In the team's season opener against the Baltimore Blue Birds, Adamitis scored the game's only touchdown in a 7–3 Washington victory. The Baltimore Sun wrote the following about Adamatis's rushing attack:

"Bill Adamaitis, Catholic University halfback, was the running star of the visitors. Not only did he make the touchdown on a wide sweep around the right end, but his shifty gallops threatened more than once earlier in the contest."

Two weeks later, a newspaper account of a game against the Wilmington Clippers of the American Association (later renamed the American Football League) credited Adamaitis with leading the Washington attack: "Bill Adamaitis, a 200-pound back, bore the brunt of the Presidents' attack and he proved by far the outstanding ball carrier of the game. It was Bill's fine line plunging that gave the Washington eleven its only score of the contest after a march of 38 yards in the final period."

On October 31, 1937, in Washington's home opener, a 24–7 victory over Norfolk, The Washington Post credited Adamaitis's short passing game for a second quarter touchdown and with "skirting the ends" and "ramming the center" in a final touchdown drive.

With his "aerial offensive", Adamaitis led the Presidents to an undefeated 5–0–1 record against Dixie League opponents (5–2–1 overall) in the regular season and a match-up against the Baltimore Blue Birds in the 1937 Dixie League championship game. The Presidents and Blue Birds played to a 3–3 tie in the championship game. Because Baltimore had a loss in conference play, the Presidents were recognized as the 1937 Dixie League champions.

== Later years ==
After retiring from football, Adamaitis worked with heat treaters, annealers, and temperers at the Wyman-Gordon Company, In November 1942, he enlisted in the United States Army at Fort Devens in Massachusetts. Adamaitis served in the Army's Special Services unit from 1942 to 1946. He later coached basketball and football at Worcester South High School from 1946 to 1955 and at Shrewsbury High School from 1956 to 1957. He was later the basketball and football coach at St. Peter's High School in Worcester and the school's athletic director from 1963 to 1968.

Adamaitis died in February 1968 at age 53.
