= 1936 Orange Bowl =

American college football game

- 2nd Orange Bowl
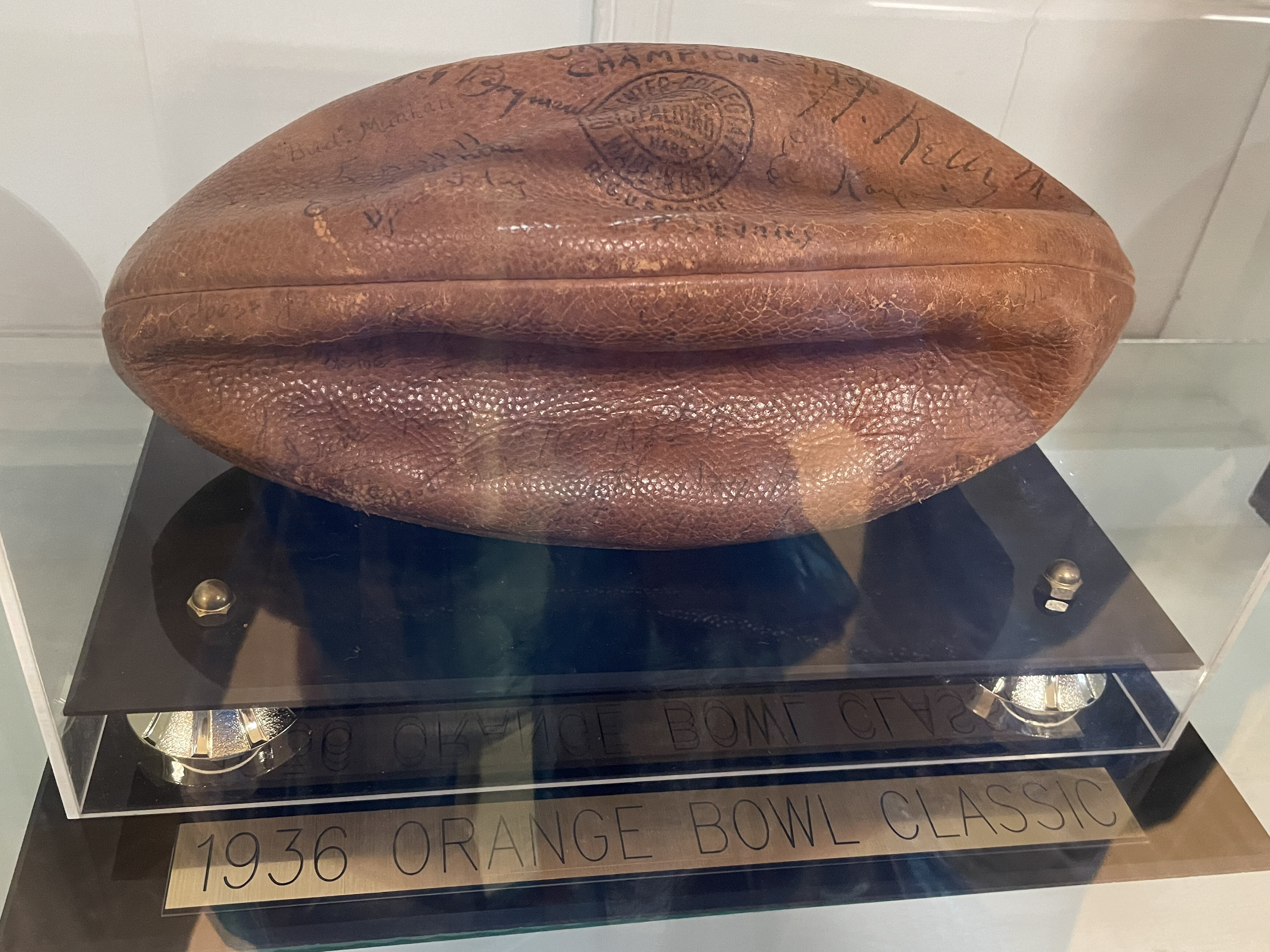
- Game Ball
Ole Miss Rebels	Catholic University Cardinals
(9–2)	(7–1)
SEC	Independent
19	20
Head coach: Ed Walker	Head coach: Dutch Bergman
	1	2	3	4	Total
Ole Miss	0	6	0	13	19
Catholic University	7	6	7	0	20
- Date: January 1, 1936
- Season: 1935
- Stadium: Miami Stadium
- Location: Miami, Florida
- Referee: Tom Thorp
- Attendance: 6,568 – 10,000

United States TV coverage
- Network: CBS Radio
- Announcers: Bill Munday

The 1936 Orange Bowl was a post-season college football bowl game between the Catholic University Cardinals and Ole Miss Rebels played on January 1, 1936, in Miami, Florida. The second edition of the Orange Bowl, the game was won by Catholic University, 20–19.

== Regular season ==
The Cardinals opened their season with four consecutive victories. In the course of the 1935 season they had three shutouts, gave up only 34 points, and did not allow a rushing touchdown. They entered the bowl with a record of 7–1.

The Rebels also began their season with a series of victories, including a 92–0 blowout against the Memphis Tigers in the second game. They entered the bowl with a record of 9–2.

== Lead up to the game ==
On the trip from D.C. to Miami, the Cardinals were on the same train as Earl Carroll's "Vanities girls." Carroll, known as "the troubadour of the nude", was famous for his productions featuring the most lightly clad showgirls on Broadway. Coach Dutch Bergman put his team under "martial law," fearing his players and the showgirls would "dance their football game away before they played." The experience was enough to make Bergman vow to never accept another Bowl bid, but he did, four years later, when the Cardinals played in the 1940 Sun Bowl.

The very first King Orange Jamboree Parade was held the day before the game with 30 floats at an expense of $40,000 ($653,933 in 2012 dollars). Babs Beckwith was chosen as the first Orange Bowl queen.

== Game summary ==
Ole Miss	Statistic	Catholic
15	First downs	7
15	Penalties	30
3	Fumbles	1
1	Fumbles recovered	2
250	Yards gained	124
38	Yards lost	0
12	Passes attempted	3
3	Passes completed	1
4	Passes intercepted	2
53	Passing yards	48
37	Avg. punts	39
16	Avg. Punt return	8
35	Avg. kickoffs	50
25	Avg. kickoff return	15

There was little interest in Miami before the game, as indicated by sluggish ticket sales and few bets placed. Despite this, CUA was predicted to win "by the smallest of margins."

Pete Dranginis, the Cardinals' quarterback, threw a one-yard pass to Bill Adamaitis in the first quarter to give the team an early 7–0 lead. In the second Adamaitis threw a 52-yard touchdown pass to Stuart "Stee" Foley, making Adamaitis the first of only three players to catch and throw a touchdown pass in the same Orange Bowl. In that same quarter the Rebels got on the board when quarterback Ned Peters scored on a 67-yard run. The score stood at 13–6 at halftime.

In the third quarter Mississippi's Dave Bernard attempted a punt, but the Cardinals' entire right side broke through the line and center Joe Yanchulis blocked the kick. Backup end Ferdie Rydzewski recovered the ball and ran for a 20-yard touchdown to bring the score to 20–6.

A late game rally "kept 10,000 fans howling." Ole Miss scored the first of two fourth quarter touchdowns on a run by Dave Bernard — the first rushing touchdown the Cardinals allowed all season. The point after touchdown was missed, however, leaving the score 20–12. The Mississippians struck again late in the period on a 29-yard touchdown pass from Bernard to end Buster Poole, but the effort was too little, too late with a final score of 20–19, Cardinals.

George Mulligan, a Cardinal, tore ligaments in his leg during the third quarter, and "Irish" Carroll, described as the Cardinals' "chief scoring hope" going into the game, didn't have a point attached to it after the final whistle.

This was the first Orange Bowl to be broadcast on radio, and legendary sports writer Grantland Rice was also in the press box.

== Post-game celebrations ==
After the game, the Cardinals were inundated with fans seeking autographs at the Hotel Flamingo and "a heap of telegrams" of congratulations poured in from around the country. In the days that followed, the Cardinals celebrated by sightseeing in Miami, going deep sea fishing, and going to dog races as the guest of Tiny Parker.

=== Return to D.C. ===
The Cardinals returned to Washington on Sunday, January 5. A crowd of 3,000 greeted them at Union Station, and when the train pulled in the crowd let up a cheer that, according to The Washington Post, "must have caused serious disturbances on the Georgetown scismograph."

A parade including 300 cars, the U.S. Navy Band, the Washington Boys Club Band, and many foot marchers brought the team from Union Station up Pennsylvania Avenue, to Connecticut Avenue, and from there to Rhode Island Avenue and back to the CUA campus. President Franklin D. Roosevelt, "on his way to church, became an unwitting parader, when the march de triumph jammed traffic in front of the White House."

A crowd of 1,000 greeted the players when they returned to campus and mass was celebrated in the Basilica of the National Shrine of the Immaculate Conception for them by Maurice S. Sheehy, assistant rector. A bonfire was also held that evening.

=== Banquet ===
A "victory dinner" was held to honor the Cardinal players on February 3 at the Willard Hotel. After awards and certificates were presented, a special radio broadcast on NBC ran from 10:00 to 10:30. The night concluded with dancing.

In attendance were "Washingtonians from all walks of life, representatives of the national and District governments, local businesses, professions, and clubs." District Commissioners George E. Allen, who served as toastmaster, Melvin C. Hazen, and Col. Daniel I. Sultan were in attendance as were the chairmen of the Congress' District of Columbia committees, Senator William H. King and Representative Mary Teresa Norton. Others included members of the Mississippi Congressional delegation, the presidents of Georgetown University and the University of Maryland, members of Congress and the executive branch, and local notables. To promote the event, the team was met on the steps of the DC Municipal Building by several of the district's commissioners a few days before.

In addition, the Florida State Society held a tribute to the Cardinals at the Washington Hotel the previous Saturday night.

=== Lithuanians ===
Seven members of the Cardinals were of Lithuanian descent, including Captain Ed Karpowich. Povilas Zadeikis, the Lithuanian government's representative in the United States, and members of the Lithuanian Society of America were on hand to greet the team when it pulled into Union Station and presented the seven players with certificates of merit at a banquet held a few weeks later.
