= Buster Poole =

American football player (1915–1994)

- Poole during his junior year at Ole Miss

No. 23, 48, 80
- Position: End

Personal information
- Born: September 9, 1915; Gloster, Mississippi, U.S.
- Died: November 16, 1994 (aged 79); Oxford, Mississippi, U.S.
- Listed height: 6 ft 3 in (1.91 m)
- Listed weight: 220 lb (100 kg)

Career information
- College: Ole Miss (1934–1936)
- NFL draft: 1937: 7th round, 64th overall pick

Career history
- New York Giants (1937–1941); Chicago Cardinals (1945); New York Giants (1945–1946)

Awards and highlights
- NFL champion (1938); 3× First-team All-Pro (1939, 1940, 1946); Second-team All-Pro (1938; 3× NFL All-Star (1938-1940)

Career NFL statistics
- Receptions: 65
- Receiving yards: 895
- Receiving touchdowns: 13
- Stats at Pro Football Reference

James Eugene "Buster" Poole (September 9, 1915 – November 16, 1994) was an American athlete and coach. A three sport star, Poole is best remembered as an end who played football collegiately for the Ole Miss Rebels and professionally for seven seasons primarily for the New York Giants of the National Football League (NFL). After his professional football retirement Poole also served briefly as head coach of the Ole Miss basketball team before becoming a career position coach for Johnny Vaught and the Ole Miss football team, which won two national titles during his tenure.

Poole was the oldest of four brothers who all played end at Ole Miss and later in the NFL, being followed to the pro circuit by siblings Ollie (1947), Ray (1947–52), and Barney (1949–55).

In 1965, Buster Poole was inducted into the Mississippi Sports Hall of Fame.

== Biography ==
=== Early life ===
James Poole, commonly known by the nickname "Buster," was born in Gloster, Mississippi on September 9, 1915. He attended the segregated Natchez High School in Natchez, Mississippi, where he demonstrated his athletic prowess as a three-sport star, playing football, basketball, and baseball for the Indians.

Poole graduated from Natchez High in the spring of 1932.

=== Collegiate career ===
Poole attended the University of Mississippi, playing football for the freshman team of the Ole Miss Mighty Mississippians in 1933. He participated in the 1934 spring practice program in anticipation of joining the varsity team in the fall of that year. Poole saw significant game action as a sophomore, quickly sliding into a starting role in that 1934 season.

Following the conclusion of football season, Poole went out for the Ole Miss basketball team, with the former Mississippi high school squad making the squad coached by Ed Walker. Before long Poole was starting at center and making his mark as a scorer, posting a game-high 14 points in a narrow 35–33 victory over arch-rivals Mississippi State.

During his collegiate career the 6'3" Poole, who played at a listed weight of 205 pounds, established himself both as a talented pass catcher and an effective defender, highlighted in one November 1935 game, a 6–0 victory over Centenary College of Louisiana, in which Poole provided the only scoring with a well-timed interception returned for touchdown.

The 1935 Ole Miss squad finished the season with a 9–2 record, winning a berth to the 1936 Orange Bowl game — a New Year's Day battle with Catholic University of America of Washington, DC. In that game Poole was the recipient of a 29-yard touchdown pass from quarterback Dave Bernard in the 4th quarter, but the Ole Miss rally fell one point short in a narrow 20 to 19 defeat.

Poole returned to the hardwood for the Ole Miss basketball team in 1936, following conclusion of the football season, starting at guard. He also played baseball as an outfielder in the spring. He finished second in balloting for the Norris Trophy, awarded annually to Ole Miss's outstanding sports personality.

The 1936 season saw Buster Poole the starting left end of the Ole Miss football squad. Although Poole had by now distinguished himself nationally for his size and skill at the end position, the Mississippi team did not have as successful a season as the previous campaign, finishing with a record of 5 wins, 5 losses, and 2 ties.

He was also elected captain of the school's basketball team for the 1937 season that began that winter.

=== Professional career ===
In December 1936 Poole was selected in the seventh round of the 1937 NFL draft by the New York Giants. Poole signed a contract with the team in August.

Poole played in all 11 of the team's games in his 1937 rookie season, starting in 9 contests, catching a total of 5 passes for 2 touchdowns. The team would finish second in the NFL's Eastern Division, with a record of 6 wins, 3 losses, and 2 ties.

During his NFL career Poole supplanted his football income by playing semi-professional basketball and baseball, participating in the latter sport as a member of the Evanston Bees of the Illinois-Indiana-Iowa (Three-I) League.

The 1938 NFL season, his second in the league, was a great one for Poole and the New York Giants, with the team finishing with a record of 8–2–1 en route to an Eastern Division title. During the year Poole started 10 of 11 games for the Giants, catching a total of 7 balls for one touchdown. In the 1938 NFL Championship playoff game, the Giants faced off against the Green Bay Packers, winning by a score of 23–17 in front of more than 48,000 fans packed into New York City's Polo Grounds.

The year 1939 was another exceptional one for the Giants and their Mississippi-born star end. Poole started all 11 of New York's games, as the Giants again finished on top of the NFL's Eastern Division with a record of 9–1–1 winning a spot in the 1939 NFL Championship playoff game. In the 1939 Championship rematch against the Packers, winners of the West, things went awry for the New York squad, however, with the Giants shut out by a score of 27–0.

Despite never finding the end zone in the 1939 season, Poole was elected by the head coaches of the league as a first-team NFL All-League player, joining Packer pass-catcher Don Hutson as ends on the illustrious 11-man squad.

Poole would also start every game in the 1940 and 1941 seasons for head coach Steve Owen and the New York Giants, catching a total of 16 balls for 230 yards and 5 touchdowns over that course of time. He would be remembered for a brilliant interception with time running out in a game late in the 1941 season against the Philadelphia Eagles that enabled the Giants to capture the Eastern Division title for the sixth time. The Giants would again fall short in the 1941 NFL Championship game, however, losing to the Chicago Bears by the lopsided score of 37–9.

Poole's time in the NFL was interrupted by the outbreak of World War II. He joined the US Navy, for which he played football on two of the branch's premiere service teams, the Georgia Pre-Flight Skycrackers in 1942 and Iowa Pre-Flight Seahawks in 1944. Poole rose to the rank of first lieutenant during the war years and was discharged in 1945.

After the war, Poole returned to the ranks of the NFL for a sixth season, starting the year with the Chicago Cardinals before being transferred back to the Giants after nine games. He would return to the team for a seventh and final season in 1946, starting all 11 games and tallying career highs in receptions (24) and yards gained (307), and tying his best mark for touchdowns (3).

Poole retired from professional football at the end of the 1946 season at the age of 31.

=== Coaching career ===
In January 1946, Poole was appointed interim head coach of the Ole Miss basketball team after the sudden retirement of Edwin "Goat" Hale. News reports indicated that the position was regarded as stop-gap, noting Poole's plans to return to professional football for the forthcoming 1946 season.

Following the 1946 NFL season and his retirement as a player, Poole moved into the coaching profession, accepting a position as ends coach for new head coach Johnny Vaught at Ole Miss. Vaught's tenure as head coach of the Rebels would be a long one and Poole would remain a key member of Vaught's staff throughout the entire decades of the 1950s and 1960s following his assumption of duties as defensive line coach in 1951.

During the 1946 to 1970 Vaught era at Ole Miss, of which assistant coach Buster Poole was an important part, the Rebels captured two national titles, posted four undefeated seasons, raised six Southeastern Conference championship banners, and won more than 70% of their games en route to a record 18 consecutive bowl game appearances.

In 1971 Billy Kinard was named head coach of the Ole Miss football program and new assistant coaches named. Veteran assistant Buster Poole was promoted to a new position as assistant athletic director, serving under AD Frank "Bruiser" Kinard, a fellow assistant coach with Johnny Vaught.

=== Later years, death, and legacy ===
Jim "Buster" Poole died of cancer on November 16, 1994. He was 79 years old at the time of his death. Poole was buried at Oxford Memorial Cemetery in Oxford, Mississippi.

Poole was the oldest of four brothers who all played end at Ole Miss and later in the NFL, being followed to the pro circuit by siblings Ollie (1947), Ray (1947–52), and Barney (1949–55).

Poole's son, James Poole Jr., also played end for Ole Miss and was touted as a potential All-American ahead of his 1971 senior season.

In February 1965, Poole was inducted into the Mississippi Sports Hall of Fame. He was also named a charter member of the Ole Miss Sports Hall of Fame in 1986.
