= Tobriner =

Tobriner is a surname. Notable people with the surname include:

- Ben Wildman-Tobriner (born 1984), American swimmer and physician
- Mathew Tobriner (1904–1982), American lawyer and law professor
- Walter Nathan Tobriner (1902–1979), American politician
