= F. Joseph Donohue =

American politician (1900–1978)

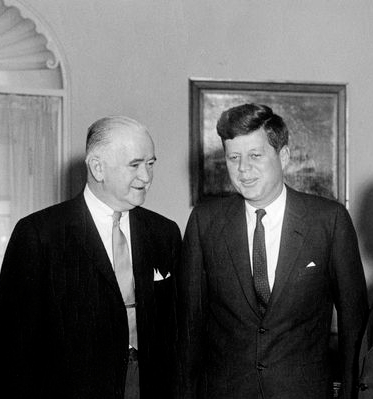

19th President of the Board of Commissioners of Washington, D.C.
- In office June 2, 1952 – April 6, 1953
- President: Harry S. Truman; Dwight D. Eisenhower
- Preceded by: John Russell Young
- Succeeded by: Samuel Spencer

District of Columbia Commissioner
- In office March 12, 1951 – April 6, 1953
- President: Harry S. Truman
- Preceded by: Guy Mason
- Succeeded by: Samuel Spencer

Personal details
- Born: January 15, 1900 Lynn, Massachusetts, U.S.
- Died: April 4, 1978 (aged 78) Washington, D.C., U.S.
- Resting place: Arlington National Cemetery
- Party: Democratic
- Spouse: Martha Vey Apperson Donohue
- Education: Catholic University
- Profession: Lawyer, Politician

Military service
- Branch/service: United States Army; United States Air Force; United States Marine Corps
- Years of service: 1917; 1942-1945
- Rank: Lieutenant Colonel
- Unit: 95th Bombardment Group
- Commands: National Capitol Wing of the Civil Air Patrol
- Battles/wars: World War I; World War II
- Awards: Bronze Star

F. Joseph "Jiggs" Donohue (January 15, 1900 – April 4, 1978) was a Washington, DC politician who served as the 19th President of the Board of Commissioners of the District of Columbia, from 1952 to 1953. He was also a lawyer who tried cases before the Supreme Court, a friend of every president from Woodrow Wilson to Jimmy Carter and soldier who served in two wars. He got the nickname "Jiggs" from Chicago White Sox first baseman Jiggs Donahue. He is the only Catholic to serve as Chief Executive of the District of Columbia.

== Early life ==
Donohue was born in Lynn, MA in 1900 and graduated from the Classical High School there. His mother was Gertrude Powers Donohue and his father, James Joseph Donohue, was an Irish immigrant. His two siblings, James and Gertrude, died in 1915. He served in the Army as a private for six months during World War I and then moved to Washington, DC to go to college. He graduated from Catholic University, where he was a star of the track team and played football and basketball, in 1922 and from law school there three year later. The year after he graduated he was a volunteer track coach at Catholic. He was one of the original inductees in the Catholic University Athletic Hall of Fame. From 1922 to 1930 he was an instructor of economics and banking at both Catholic University and the American Institute of Banking and from 1936 to 1940 he taught law at Columbus University, now part of Catholic University and for a time at the Army War College. During this time he revised the textbook, "Standard Banking," for the American Bankers Association and He was a director of the First National Bank of Washington. He formed a law firm with Milton S. Kronheim, Jr. and the two went into the service together during World War II.

Donohue entered the service in 1942 as a captain in the 95th Bombardment group and was an Army Air Force combat intelligence officer. He saw duty in England and France, earned a Bronze Star and left in 1945 as a lieutenant colonel. He remained in the Air Force Reserve. He also served in the Marine Corps. In 1949, he married Martha Vey Apperson, the sister-in-law of his commanding officer during World War II, Lt. Gen. Ira C. Eaker.

After the war Kronheim became a judge and Donohue formed a different law firm.

== Public life ==
In the 1940s he was special assistant to the U.S. attorney general and moved to San Francisco where he successfully prosecuted labor leader Harry Bridges, whose deportation was sought by the government. (The conviction later was reversed). He returned to Washington and continued to work for the Attorney General and in private practice. In 1950, he became assistant director in charge of enforcement in the Office of Price Stabilization. He was a fervent anti-communist who defended Helen Gahagan Douglas, the Democratic opponent of Richard Nixon in the 1950 California Senate Election, when she was accused of being a communist.

In 1951, President Truman - who Donohue was known to play poker with - appointed him to the D.C. Board of Commissioners, which was celebrated by residents because Donohue was an open supporter of District of Columbia home rule but opposed by those in the temperance movement because of his ties to the liquor industry. In 1952, he replaced John Russell Young as the President of the Board of Commissioners and served until the end of the Truman administration. During his time he was known for making speeches, hosting weekly TV and radio shows where he gave people a weekly update on the local government and improving the police department. He also sought more money for the District, accusing the Federal Government of "studied neglect," which he wanted to spend on long-range investments and improvements within the black schools (which were still segregated at the time - something he asked Congress to end). During his time as president, board meetings were opened to the press, a day was set aside each month to hear citizens views on proposed changes in regulations, a Citizens Advisory Council was established, and the firing, hiring and promotion of employees became based on merit rather than politics.

== Later life and death ==
After leaving office, Donohue ran the 1956 presidential campaign of Sen. Estes Kefauver, who failed to get the nomination but was tapped for vice-president and then served as vice chairman of the Stevenson-Kefauver Campaign Committee. In 1960, he testified before Congress against the idea of retrocession and in favor of the 23rd Amendment. Later however, he opposed home rule and a voting delegate to Congress.

He commanded the National Capitol Wing of the Civil Air Patrol from 1956 to 1961.

In later life, Donohue returned to law practice representing banks before the federal reserve and argued cases before the Supreme Court and was California Lieutenant Governor Ed Reinecke's lawyer during his perjury trial.

On April 4, 1978, he died of a heart attack at George Washington University Hospital and was later buried in Arlington National Cemetery.

Political offices
Preceded by John Russell Young	President of the D.C. Board of Commissioners; 1952-1953	Succeeded by Samuel Spencer
