= Greg Cordivari =

American football player (born 1991)

No. 10
- Position: Quarterback

Personal information
- Born: March 21, 1991 (age 35); Downingtown, Pennsylvania, U.S.
- Listed height: 6 ft 0 in (1.83 m)
- Listed weight: 201 lb (91 kg)

Career information
- High school: Bishop Shanahan
- College: Catholic University (2009–2012)

Awards and highlights
- 2011 Melberger Trophy Winner; 2011 honorable mention All-American by Beyond Sports College Network (BSN); 2011 ODAC All Conference; 2011 ODAC Academic All Conference

Greg Cordivari (born March 21, 1991) is an American college football quarterback from Downingtown, Pennsylvania. He was the starting quarterback for The Catholic University of America's Cardinals football team.

== Early life ==
Cordivari is a class of 2009 Bishop Shanahan High School player. His senior year as quarterback Greg Cordivari passed 224.8 yards per game for the Bishop Shanahan Eagles.

== College career ==
His first year at Catholic was the 2009 season, when Cordivari played in one game, completing 18-of-35 passes for 222 yards. Long pass was 55 yards. Also rushed twice. In 2010, he was named ODAC Player of the Week (Sept. 12, 2010), appeared in all ten games, completed 195 passes for 2,205 yards and 20 touchdowns, attempted 18 rushes and scored one touchdown. He averaged 220.5 yards passing per game.[3] In 2011 Cordivari entered Catholic's record book, establishing new school records for completions (321) and attempts (505), while also setting the school record for single game completions (46) and attempts (67). Cordivari's 3,282 passing yards rank second best in school's history, while his 25 touchdown passes and 63.6 completion percentage are third best. He also ecplised the 400 yard mark on two occasions during the season, including a career-high 459 in a win over McDaniel College. He went over 300 yards in seven games and threw multiple touchdowns in every game, but one. Cordivari finished the season ranked seventh nationally in total offense, averaging 315.5 yards per game. At the end of the season, he received the Melberger Award[4] and was named an honorable mention All-American by Beyond Sports College Network (BSN).
