= Robert Enoch McLaughlin =

American politician

21st President of the Board of Commissioners of Washington, D.C.
- In office April 6, 1956 – March 3, 1961
- President: Dwight D. Eisenhower; John F. Kennedy
- Preceded by: Samuel Spencer
- Succeeded by: Walter Nathan Tobriner

District of Columbia Commissioner
- In office June 2, 1955 – July 27, 1961
- President: Dwight D. Eisenhower; John F. Kennedy
- Preceded by: Renah F. Camalier
- Succeeded by: John B. Duncan

Personal details
- Born: February 4, 1907 Hobbieville, Indiana, U.S.
- Died: November 19, 1978 (aged 71) Blue Hill, Maine, U.S.
- Resting place: Arlington National Cemetery
- Party: Republican
- Spouse: Ellen May Newman McLaughlin
- Children: Robert C. H. McLaughlin; Stephen F. McLaughlin
- Education: United States Naval Academy; Institut de Touraine; National University
- Profession: Lawyer, Politician
- Awards: French Legion of Honor; Belgian Order of the Crown; Order of the Crown of Siam

Military service
- Branch/service: United States Navy
- Years of service: 1932–35,
- Rank: Lieutenant Commander
- Battles/wars: World War II; Operation Torch

Robert Enoch McLaughlin (1907–1978) was a Washington, DC politician who served as the 21st President of the Board of Commissioners of the District of Columbia, from 1956 to 1961. He is the last Republican to serve as Chief Executive for the District of Columbia.

== Early life ==
McLaughlin was born in 1907 in rural Greene County, Indiana, where he attended school until joining the Navy at age 15 and he was assigned, at his request, to the Naval Hospital in Washington. DC. Based on a competitive examination, he won an appointment to the Naval Academy in 1925 and but resigned after two years and went to Paris briefly for international studies at the Institut de Touraine. He returned to Washington, DC where he earned a law degree from National University in 1930 while working nights as a deputy clerk in the municipal court and as a law clerk in the United States Attorney's office. He was admitted to the bar in 1932 and went into private practice. From 1934 to 1941 he was an attorney and examiner with the Federal Trade Commission, working in both Washington and New York, New York.

In 1941 he rejoined the Navy and served overseas during World War II earning the rank of Lieutenant Commander. He was assigned to Naval Intelligence and participated in the North African Campaign. He was with the assault group on Morocco and spent two years in Casablanca.

After the war, he was assistant legislative assistant for the Veterans of Foreign War and the legislative director for AmVets. McLaughlin met his wife, Ellen May Newman who was an Englishwoman working at the British Embassy, in Washington in 1947. In 1949 he joined a DC law firm working utility cases.

== Public life ==
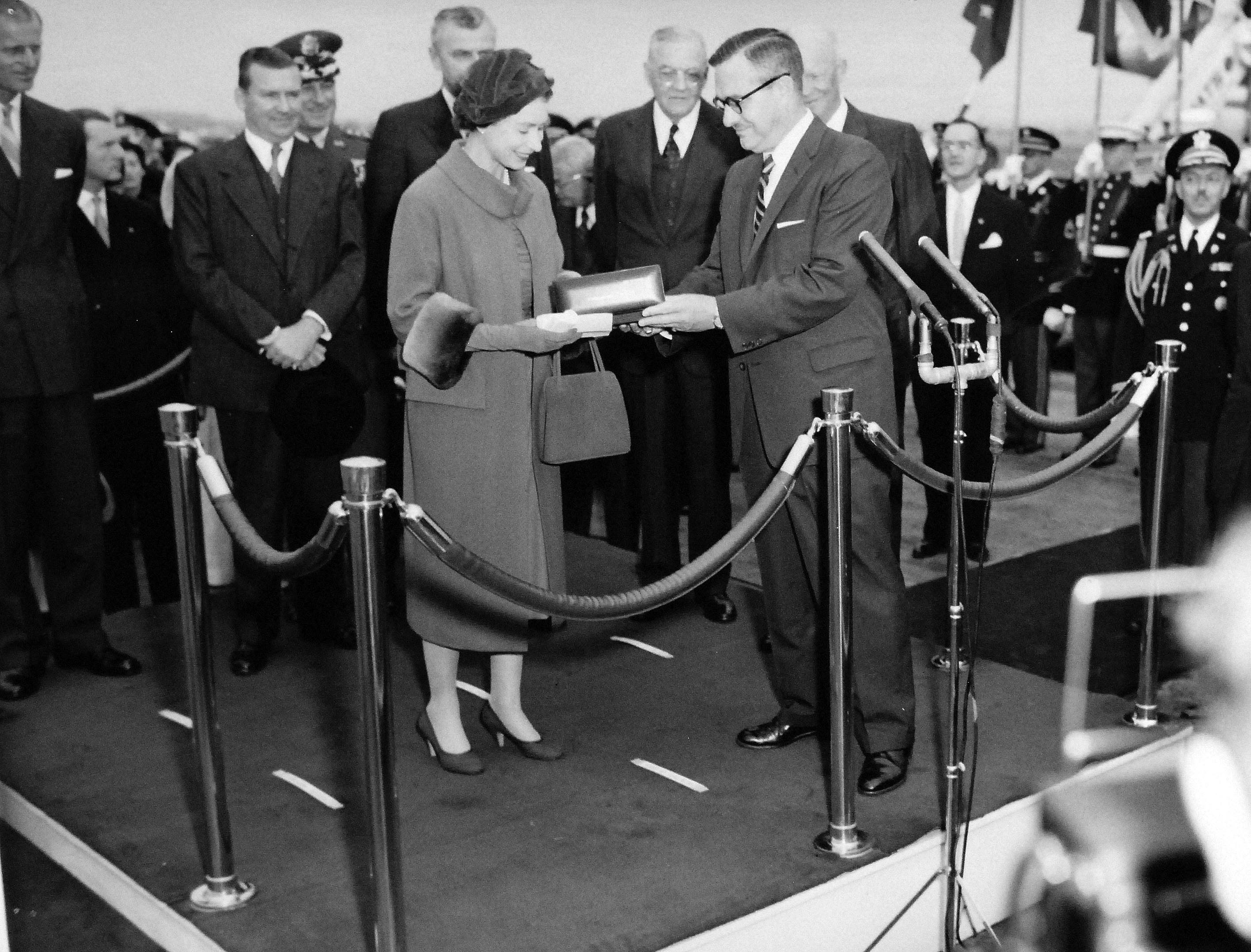
Her Majesty Queen Elizabeth II is presented the Key to the City of Washington by District Commissioner Robert E. McLaughlin in 1957

In 1952 he founded the District's Eisenhower-for-President Club and was rewarded with an appointment to the District's Public Utilities Commission. As president of the commission he helped cancel Capital Traction Company's streetcar franchise, leading to the formation of DC Transit. He also supported the controversial provision that streetcars be removed from service and replaced with buses.

In 1955, Eisenhower appointed him the Board of Commissioners and in 1956 he became the board's President. In 1957 he convened a meeting of regional leaders that eventually led to the formation of the Metropolitan Washington Council of Governments. He was a proponent of highway expansion, which mostly did not happen, and of the creation of a regional transit system. He was instrumental in getting the Eisenhower Administration to support what would eventually become the Washington Metro and in forming the National Capital Transportation Agency. He supported integration - withholding construction contracts from companies that didn't have black employees - and often found himself in conflict with southern Democrats in Congress. He created the Human Relations Council which became the DC Office of Human Rights. He was a vehement supporter of home rule, so much so that the House's District Committee considered censuring him over it. He supported bills to add an elected city council and others to have an elected mayor; supported the passage of the 23rd Amendment which occurred while he was on the board; and the creation of a city-wide primary in 1956 to choose delegates to the two conventions. He led the creation of the police's K-9 corps. After the Kennedy election, McLaughlin was replaced as President of the Board by Walter N. Tobriner, a Democrat; but McLaughlin chose to serve out his term in order to get his retirement benefits and left the Board at the end of July when his replacement was confirmed. His replacement Frank D. Reeves was the first black member of the Board, a fact that McLaughlin celebrated.

He also had the "Our Nation's Capital" march designated the city's official march.

== Later life and death ==
After resigning as commissioner, McLaughlin moved into banking and private law practice. He later moved to Brooklin, Maine and continued to practice law there as well as serve as secretary-treasurer of Pioneer Airlines. In 1964, he was forced out of leadership in the GOP when he became head of a "Republicans for Johnson" group out of opposition to Barry Goldwater.

On November 19, 1978, he died from a heart disorder and pneumonia at a hospital in Blue Hill, Maine. He was interred in Arlington National Cemetery.

Political offices
Preceded by Samuel Spencer	President of the D.C. Board of Commissioners; 1955-1961	Succeeded by Walter Nathan Tobriner
