= P. J. Dranginis =

American football player and coach (1909–1995)

Biographical details
- Born: November 13, 1909
- Died: August 5, 1995 (aged 85); Delray Beach, Florida, U.S.

Playing career
- 1935: Catholic University
- Position: Quarterback

Coaching career (HC unless noted)
- 1944: Middlebury

Head coaching record
- Overall: 2–1

Peter Joseph Dranginis (November 13, 1909 – August 5, 1995) was an American football player and coach. He played college football at the Catholic University of America and professionally in the American Football League (AFL) with the Boston Shamrocks and the Pittsburgh Americans. Dranginis served as the co-head football coach at Middlebury College in 1944 with C. W. Laird. Together they compiled a record of 2–1. Dranginis also played college basketball at Catholic University.

== Head coaching record ==
Year	Team	Overall	Conference	Standing	Bowl/playoffs
Middlebury Panthers (Independent) (1944)
1944	Middlebury	2–1			
Middlebury:		2–1			
Total:		2–1			
