= C. W. Laird =

American football coach

Coaching career (HC unless noted)
- 1944: Middlebury

Head coaching record
- Overall: 2–1

Charles W. Laird was the co-head football coach for the Middlebury College Panthers football team in 1944 with P. J. Dranginis. Together they compiled a record of 2–1.

== Head coaching record ==
Year	Team	Overall	Conference	Standing	Bowl/playoffs
Middlebury Panthers (Independent) (1944)
1944	Middlebury	2–1			
Middlebury:		2–1			
Total:		2–1			
