= John Russell Young (politician) =

American politician

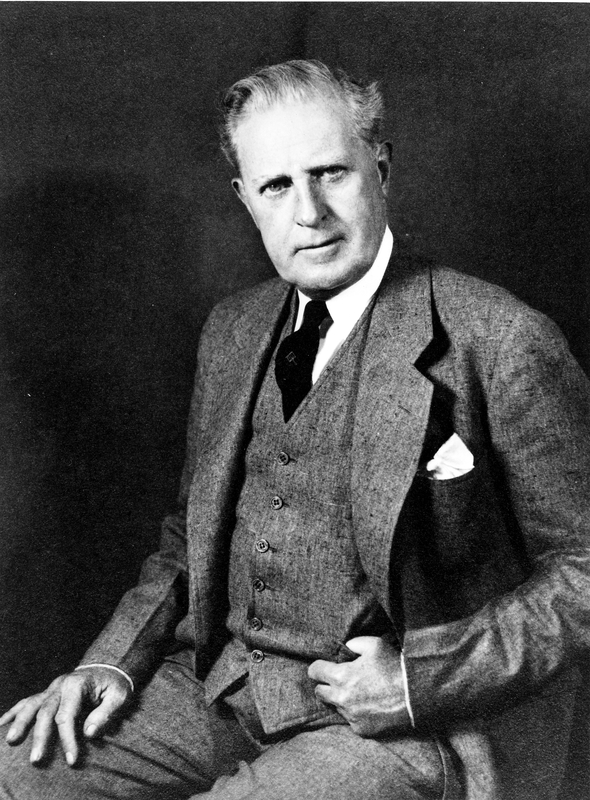
- John Russell Young ca. 1946

18th President of the Board of Commissioners of Washington, D.C.
- In office July 29, 1941 – June 2, 1952
- President: Franklin D. Roosevelt; Harry S. Truman
- Preceded by: Melvin Colvin Hazen
- Succeeded by: F. Joseph Donohue

Commissioner of the District of Columbia
- In office April 16, 1940 – June 2, 1952
- President: Franklin D. Roosevelt; Harry S. Truman
- Preceded by: George E. Allen

Personal details
- Born: April 2, 1882 Washington, DC, US
- Died: July 2, 1966 (aged 84) Washington, DC, US
- Resting place: Glenwood Cemetery
- Party: Republican
- Spouse: Nettie Thorpe Griffith Young
- Children: Mary Barclay Young; John Russell Young, Jr.
- Parents: James Rankin Young (father); Mary Barclay Young (mother)
- Relatives: John Russell Young
- Education: Industrial Art School of Pennsylvania
- Profession: Journalist, Politician

John Russell Young (April 2, 1882 – July 2, 1966) was a Washington, D.C., politician and journalist who served as the 18th president of the Board of Commissioners of the District of Columbia, from 1941 to 1952. He was the longest-serving President of the Board in the Board's history.

== Early life ==
Young was born in Washington, D.C., in 1882. His father, James Rankin Young was a congressman from Pennsylvania. His mother Mary Barclay, was from a family that had lived in the District since the 1st century. He was named for his uncle John Russell Young who was a journalist, diplomat and the 7th Librarian of Congress. Young attended schools in DC and then the Industrial Art School of Pennsylvania in Philadelphia.

He started his newspaper career in Philadelphia, where he worked from 1901 to 1905, before moving to Washington to work for the Washington Post. He held various positions at the Post, the Evening Star. the International News Service and the Washington Times over a 40-year career and spent 5 years in advertising. From 1920 to 1940 he covered the White House for the Star. He was a 3-time president of the White House Correspondents' Association, on the National Press Club's first board of governors and the 3rd member of the Gridiron Club.

He was married twice: in 1905 to Marie Gruner Krupfer of Rockville and in 1926 to Nettie Thorpe Griffith.

== Public life ==
At the time of his appointment to fill an unexpired term on the Board of Commissioners in 1940, Young was the best known and longest-serving member of the White House Press Corps. He first filled the seat left empty by Commissioner George E. Allen's resignation. From April 1940 to July 1941 he served as board member, but when Melvin Hazen died in his office, Young took over as president, first in an acting capacity and then two weeks later officially. He was nominated three more times and would go on to serve for 12 years, longer than any other President. Young was a Republican and it was unusual for the President of the Board and President of the United States to be of different parties, but Young and Roosevelt had a friendly relationship. Calvin Coolidge had sought to appoint him to the Board in 1926, but Young was ineligible as he was living in Maryland at the time.

As commissioner he was credited with reorganizing the Police Department and organizing a civilian defense corps. He continued to spend most of his time overseeing the police department and tried to address claims of police brutality, inaccurate records and corruption. The Senate investigated corruption in the Police Department in 1951–52. The report, issued after he retired, accused him of "dereliction" in supervising the police department but did not implicate him in the gambling or protection rackets it uncovered. He opposed Home Rule, but wanted Congress to give the District more money.

From 1945 to 1951, he served on the Board with Brig. Gen. Gordon Russell Young, who was the son of his namesake and thus his cousin.

== Death and honors ==
Young died on July 2, 1966, of arteriosclerosis at his home in Dupont Circle and was buried in Glenwood Cemetery with his parents.

Political offices
Preceded by Melvin Colvin Hazen	President of the D.C. Board of Commissioners; 1941-1952	Succeeded by F. Joseph Donohue
