= USS Oberrender =

US Navy destroyer, World War II

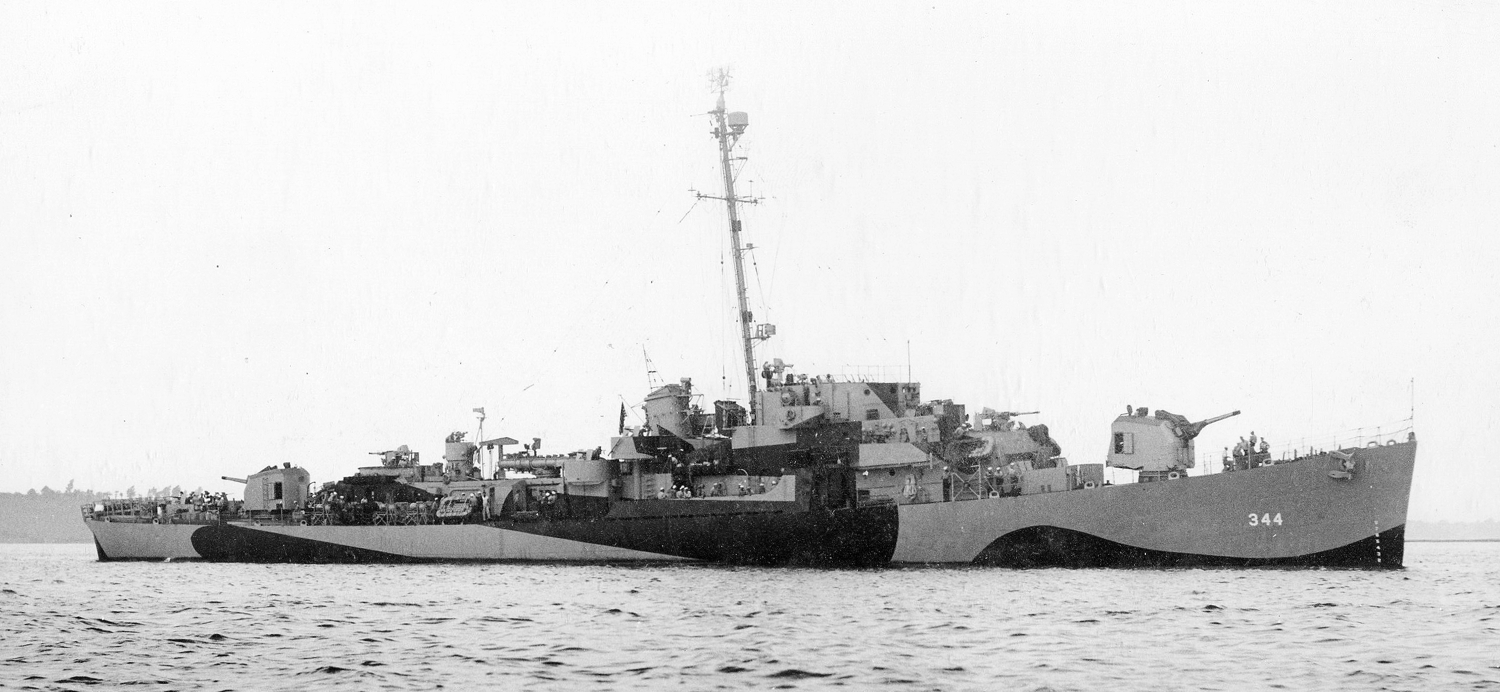
- USS Oberrender on 15 July 1944

History

United States
- Name: Oberrender
- Namesake: Thomas Olin Oberrender Jr.
- Builder: Consolidated Steel Corporation, Orange, Texas
- Laid down: 8 November 1943
- Launched: 18 January 1944
- Commissioned: 11 May 1944
- Decommissioned: 11 July 1945
- Stricken: 25 July 1945
- Identification: Hull classification symbol: DE-344
- Honors and awards: 3 battle stars
- Fate: Sunk as a target on 6 November 1945

General characteristics
- Class & type: John C. Butler–class destroyer escort
- Displacement: 1,350 long tons (1,372 t) (standard); 1,745 long tons (1,773 t) (full load)
- Length: 306 ft (93.3 m) (o/a)
- Beam: 36 ft 10 in (11.2 m)
- Draft: 13 ft 4 in (4.1 m)
- Installed power: 2 boilers; 12,000 shp (8,900 kW)
- Propulsion: 2 propellers; 2 geared steam turbines
- Speed: 24 knots (44 km/h; 28 mph)
- Range: 6,000 nmi (11,000 km; 6,900 mi) at 12 knots (22 km/h; 14 mph)
- Complement: 14 officers and 201 enlisted men
- Sensors & processing systems: SL-1 surface search radar; SA-2 air search radar; QC series sonar
- Armament: 2 × single 5 in (127 mm) guns; 2 × twin 40 mm (1.6 in) AA guns; 10 × single 20 mm (0.79 in) AA guns; 1 × triple 21 in (533 mm) torpedo tubes; 8 × depth charge throwers; 1 × Hedgehog ASW mortar; 2 × depth charge racks

USS Oberrender (DE-344) was a John C. Butler–class destroyer escort built for the United States Navy during World War II. She was named for Lieutenant Commander Thomas Olin Oberrender Jr., the engineering officer of the light cruiser USS Juneau, who was killed when that ship was torpedoed and sunk during the Naval Battle of Guadalcanal in 1942.

Laid down in November 1943, launched in January 1944, and commissioned almost four months later, Oberrender served on convoy escort duty in the Pacific from late 1944, with an interlude protecting escort carriers during the early stages of the invasion of Leyte. She was heavily damaged by the explosion of the ammunition ship USS Mount Hood at Manus and was repaired there during November. Returned to service in December, Oberrender served on anti-submarine patrol during the Battle of Okinawa, during which she was irreparably damaged by a kamikaze attack in early May 1945. As a result, she was decommissioned and sunk as a target late that year.

== Design ==
The John C. Butler–class destroyer escorts were designed to meet a need for large numbers of cheap anti-submarine escort ships for ocean convoys, and as a result carried little anti-surface armament. The class was part of an initial requirement for 720 escorts to be completed by the end of 1944, which was significantly reduced.

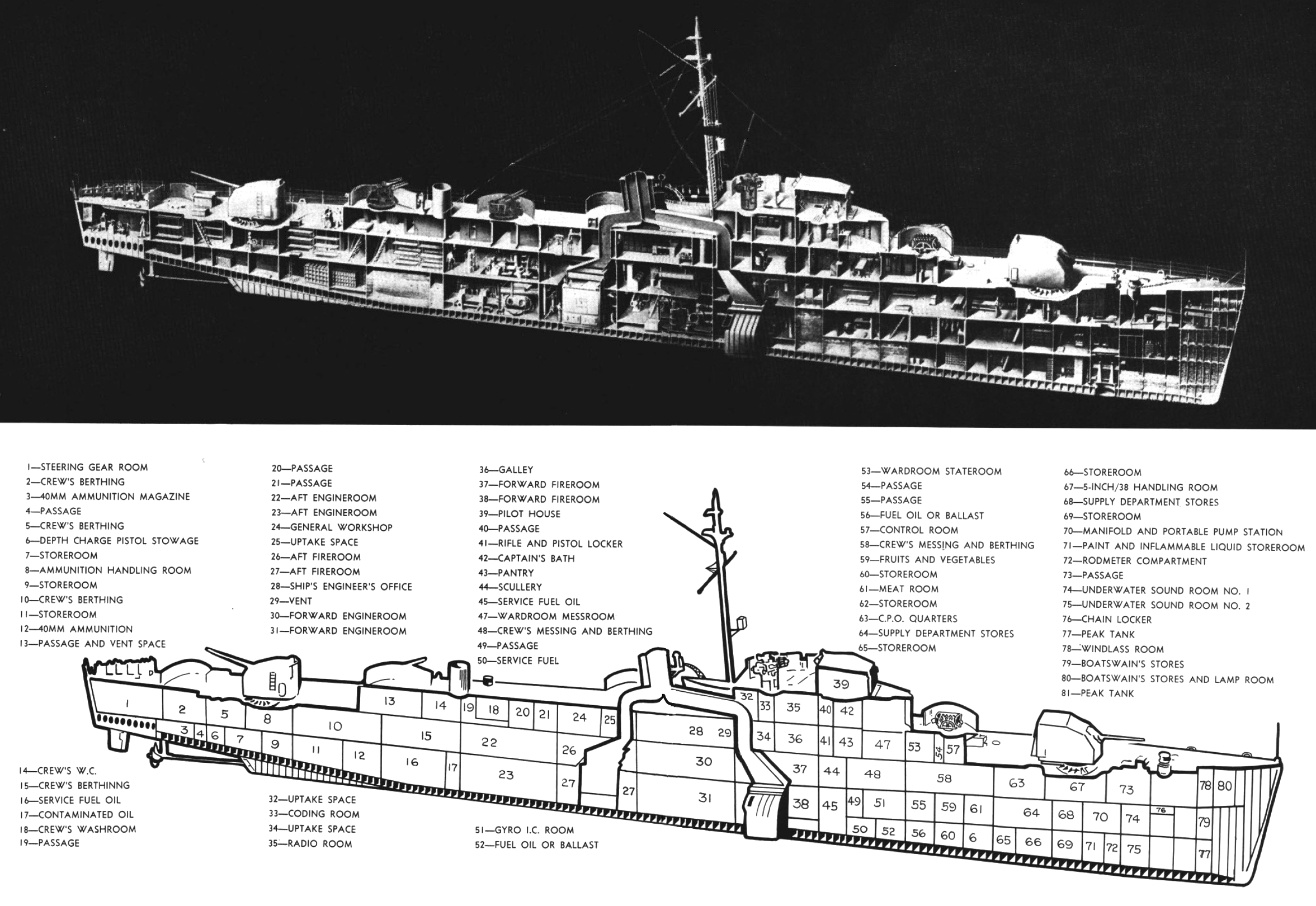
A United States Navy diagram of a destroyer escort

Oberrender was 306 feet (93.3 m) long overall with a beam of 36 feet 10 inches (11.2 m) and a draft of 13 feet 4 inches (4.1 m). She displaced 1,350 long tons (1,372 t) standard and 1,745 long tons (1,773 t) full load, with a complement of 14 officers and 201 enlisted men.

The ship was propelled by two General Electric geared steam turbines powered by two "D" Express boilers, creating 12,000 shaft horsepower (8,900 kW) for a designed maximum speed of 24 knots (44 km/h; 28 mph). She had a range of 6,000 nautical miles (11,000 km; 6,900 mi) at 12 knots (22 km/h; 14 mph).

=== Armament and sensors ===
Oberrender mounted a main battery of two single turret-mounted 5-inch (127 mm) /38 caliber guns, one forward and one aft of the superstructure, to protect against surface and aerial threats, directed by the Mark 51 Gunnery Fire-Control System. She also carried four 40-millimeter (1.6 in) Bofors anti-aircraft (AA) guns in two twin mounts, superfiring over the 5-inch guns, also controlled by the Mark 51 fire-control system, and ten single Oerlikon 20-millimeter (0.8 in) light AA guns. Equipped with three 21-inch (533 mm) centerline torpedo tubes, the ship also carried two depth charge racks, eight K-gun depth-charge throwers and one Hedgehog spigot mortar as anti-submarine weapons. She was equipped with a QC series sonar, SL-1 surface search radar, and SA-2 air search radar.

== Construction and service ==
=== Construction, shakedown, and convoy escort duty ===
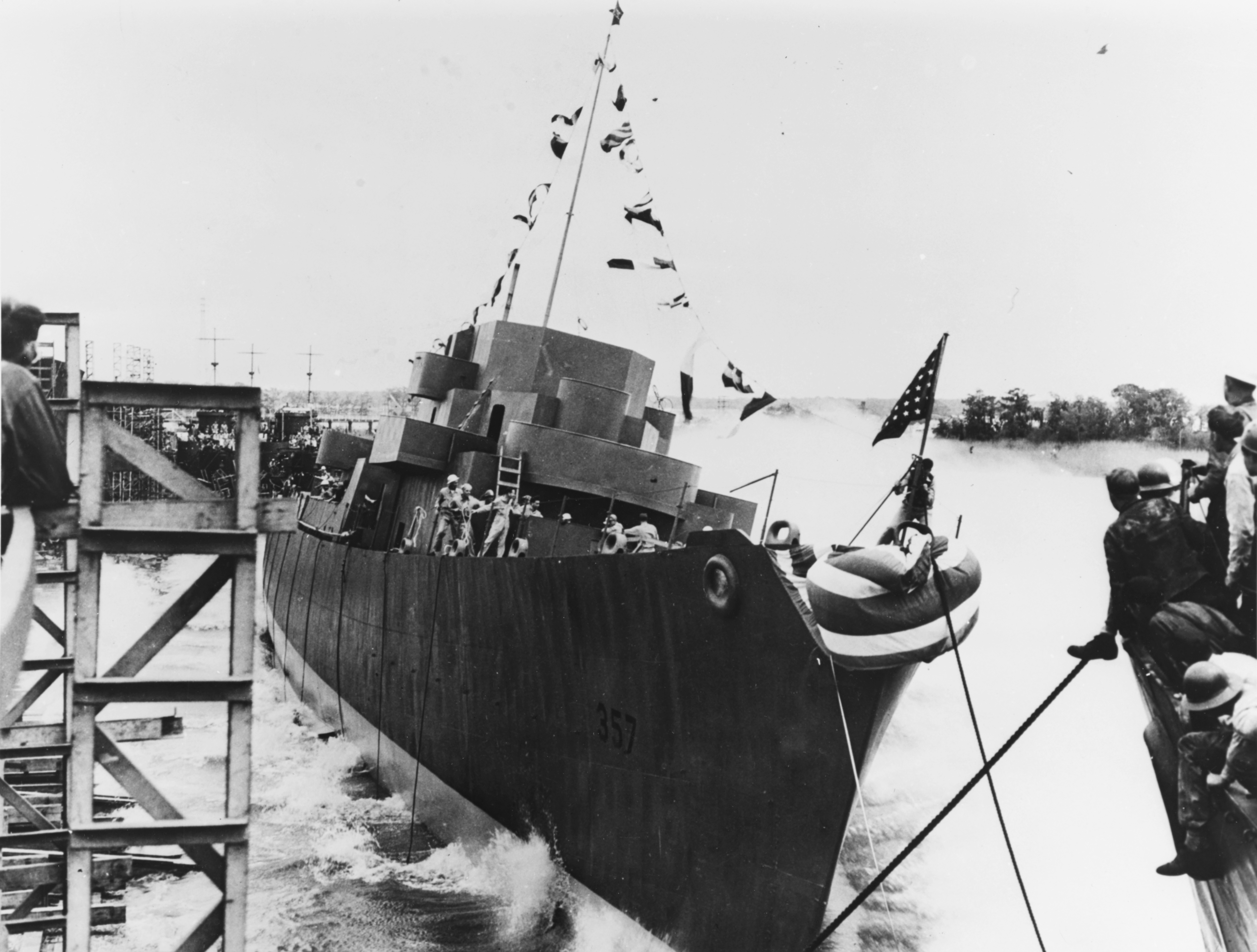
Launching of a sister ship at Consolidated Steel, April 1944

Laid down by the Consolidated Steel Corporation of Orange, Texas, on 8 November 1943, Oberrender (DE-344) was launched on 18 January 1944, sponsored by the widow of her namesake, Lieutenant Commander Thomas Olin Oberrender Jr., the engineering officer of USS Juneau, who was killed during the sinking of the latter in the Naval Battle of Guadalcanal. She was commissioned on 11 May 1944 under the command of Lieutenant Commander Samuel Spencer, who commanded the ship for the duration of her service. Following commissioning, the ship began fitting out at the Orange City Docks, followed by gunnery testing in the Gulf of Mexico. Throughout the month she conducted further training and completed her fitting out at the Todd Galveston Dry Docks. Oberrender was then degaussed before sailing for Bermuda on 28 May. After arrival, the ship undertook a shakedown cruise off the island, attached to the Atlantic Fleet.

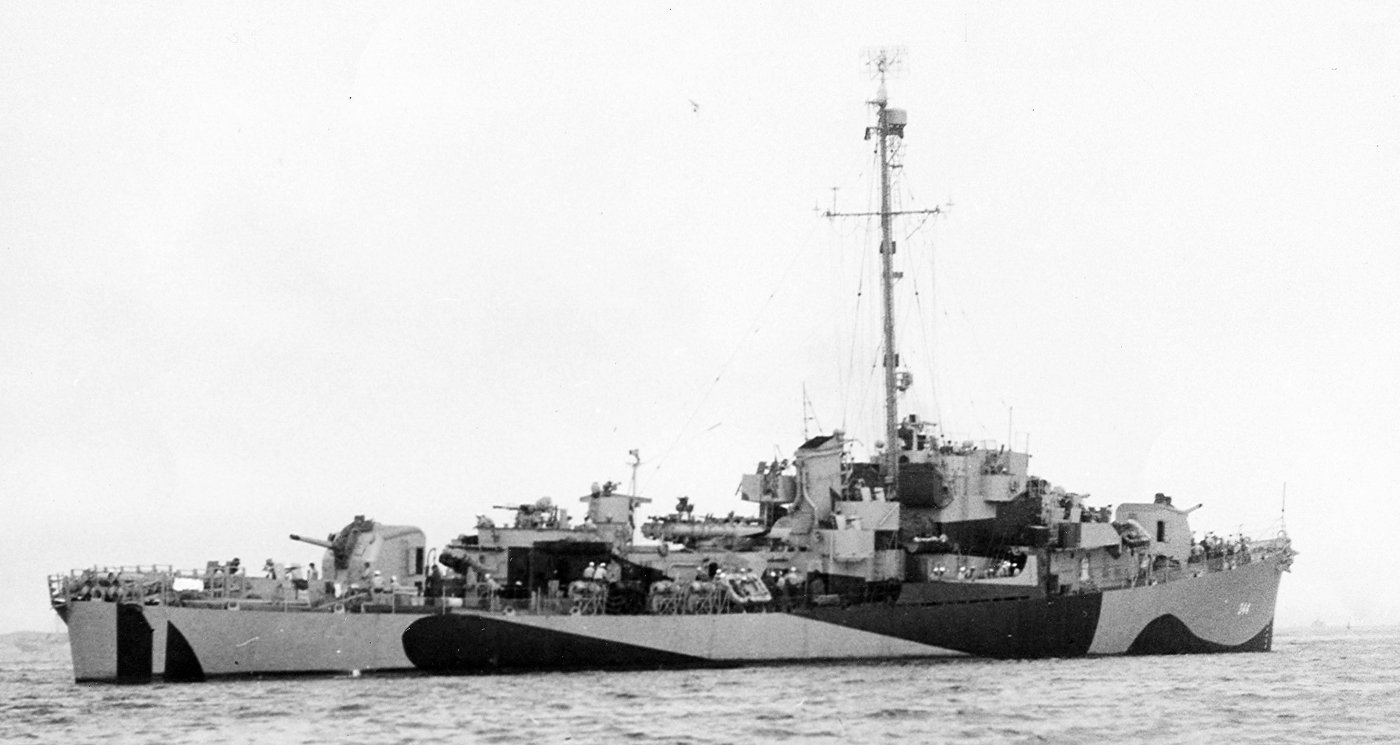
Oberrender off Boston, 15 July 1944

For repairs to correct deficiencies found during shakedown, Oberrender was ordered to the Boston Navy Yard. She was ordered to Norfolk Navy Yard for further repairs in mid-July and remained there until 22 July, when she began the journey to the Panama Canal, escorting the oiler Nantahala and tanker Nemasket. Oberrender transited the canal on 1 August, after a stopover at Aruba. Assigned to Escort Division (CortDiv) 69 of the Pacific Fleet after exiting the canal, she arrived at Pearl Harbor on 16 August, having escorted Nantahala and Nemasket there. Operating out of Pearl Harbor, Oberrender conducted training operations, including gunnery exercises, until 30 August, when she departed for Eniwetok in the Marshall Islands, escorting a convoy along with the destroyer escort Rall; both returned with another convoy to Pearl Harbor on 18 September. With fellow destroyer escorts Samuel B. Roberts and Walter C. Wann, Oberrender escorted another Eniwetok-bound convoy, arriving at her destination on 30 September.

=== Leyte and Mount Hood explosion ===
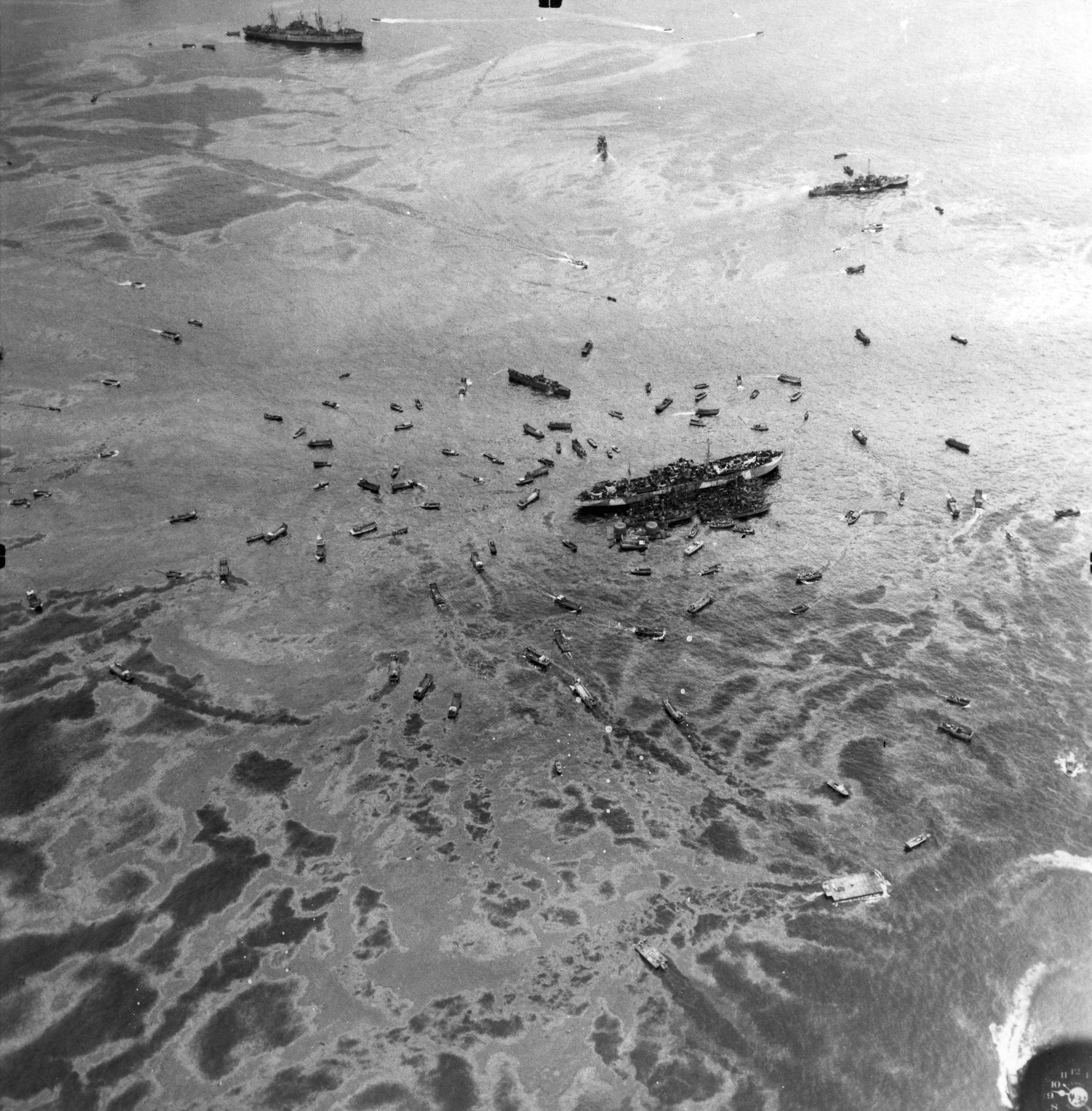
Oberrender is visible in the top right, near the oil slick created by the Mount Hood explosion.

With the other destroyer escorts of CortDiv 69, Oberrender left for Manus in the Admiralty Islands on 1 October, arriving at Seeadler Harbor five days later. Together with the destroyer escorts Walter C. Wann and LeRay Wilson, and the destroyers Haggard, Franks, and Hailey, she left Manus on 12 October, escorting Rear Admiral Thomas Sprague’s escort carriers to the Philippines for the invasion of Leyte. The destroyers and destroyer escorts screened the escort carriers of Rear Admiral Felix Stump's Task Unit 77.4.2 as they launched airstrikes against Japanese positions in the central Philippines from 17 October.

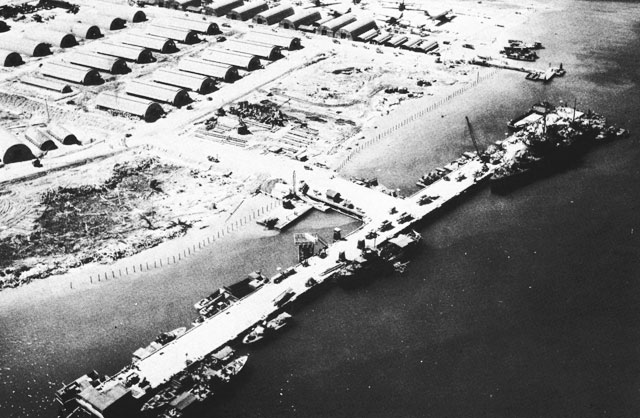
The Lombrum Point ship repair dock, where Oberrender was repaired after the Mount Hood explosion

Oberrender missed the Battle of Leyte Gulf due to being detached on 24 October to cover the movement of the escort carriers of Task Unit 77.4.1 to Morotai to take aboard replacement aircraft. After refueling in San Pedro Bay, Leyte, she returned to Task Unit 77.4.2 on 29 October for a voyage back to Manus. After arrival at Manus, the ship remained anchored in Seeadler Harbor, and on 10 November was 1,100 yards (1,000 m) from the ammunition ship USS Mount Hood when the latter exploded. She was heavily damaged by fragments and exploding ammunition from the resulting conflagration, and had to be towed to the Lombrum Point Ship Repair Dock for repairs that lasted the rest of the month. Oberrender lost one sailor missing, one killed, and seventeen wounded in the explosion.

=== Lingayen Gulf, escort and patrol duty ===
While Oberrender was under repair, CortDiv69 was attached to Task Force 79 of the Seventh Fleet. Following the completion of repairs, she went to Borgen Bay off Cape Gloucester for an anti-submarine patrol in early December. Returning to Seeadler Harbor on 11 December as part of the screen for Task Group 79.4, the destroyer escort conducted gunnery training there and en route to the Huon Gulf, where she patrolled from 18 December. With Task Group 79.2, Oberrender returned to Seeadler Harbor on 21 December, remaining there until the last day of the year, when she departed for the invasion of Lingayen Gulf as part of the screen for the task group. Again without result, she engaged a Mitsubishi A6M Zero attacking a convoy of transports.

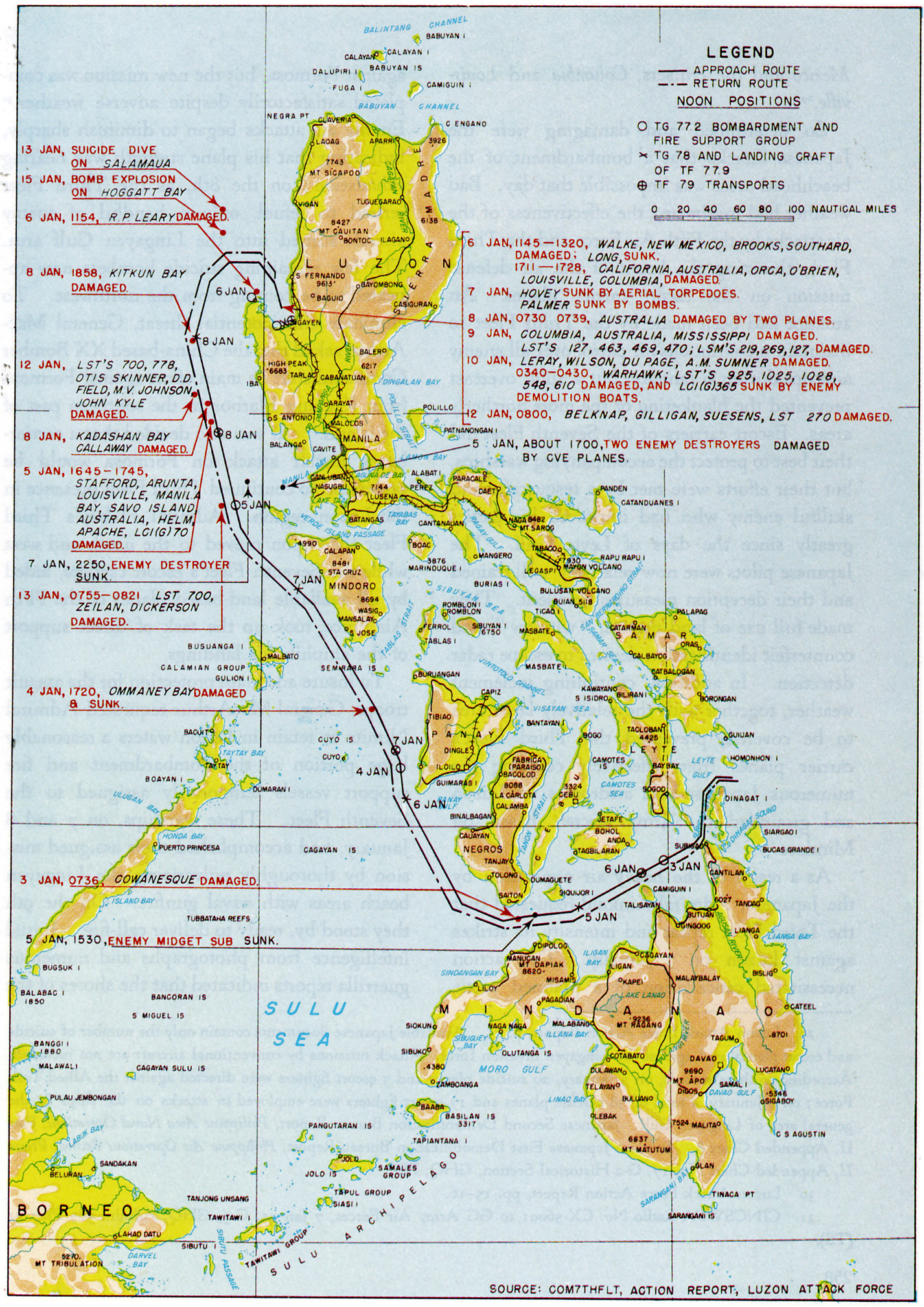
The approach to Lingayen Gulf, January 1945

Taking up duty on an anti-submarine patrol station in Lingayen Gulf between 9 and 12 January, Oberrender escaped the notice of Japanese kamikaze pilots, whose attacks damaged LeRay Wilson and the destroyer escort Gilligan, also on the patrol line. At the end of this period, she departed with Gilligan and the destroyer escort Richard W. Suesens for San Pedro Bay. The three escorts acted as part of the screen for the Landing Ship, Tanks of Task Forces 78 and 79 until arrival at the bay on 17 January. On the next day, Oberrender left for Hollandia, Netherlands New Guinea, as part of the screen for two divisions of attack cargo ships, part of Task Group 78.6. The task group was diverted to Biak en route and after arrival there, she anchored at nearby Mios Woendi Lagoon until 27 January, when she began a three-day patrol off Biak before returning to Mios Woendi.

Oberrender became part of the screen for the task group, known as the Third Lingayen Reinforcement Group, on 1 February. The latter departed from Biak with its transports carrying the 41st Infantry Division two days later, and she continued screening the task group, which unloaded its troops at Mangarin Bay on Mindoro on 9 February. After the unloading, the task group and its screen continued to San Pedro Bay, where it dissolved on 12 February, leaving Oberrender at anchor awaiting a new assignment. Three days later, she departed for Ulithi in the Caroline Islands, as part of the screen for attack transports of Task Group 78.5; the ship arrived there on 19 February and remained anchored there until 2 March, when she participated in anti-submarine training with the submarine Skipjack.

Oberrender departed Ulithi on the next day, acting as part of the screen for three fleet oilers on their voyage to the Tarraguna Anchorage near San Pedro Bay, which was reached on 7 March. Anchored in the bay for several days, she became part of Task Group 51.1 in preparation for the invasion of Okinawa, and on 10 March participated in anti-aircraft firing exercises. With the task group, the ship conducted rehearsals for the landings in Leyte Gulf between 14 and 16 March, then returned to the anchorage.

=== Okinawa ===
On 21 March, Task Group 51.1, known as the Western Islands Attack Group, departed for the Kerama Islands, which it was to secure before the invasion of Okinawa. Oberrender was included in the task group screen with Task Unit 51.1.13, which also included Richard W. Suesens and Abercrombie from CortDiv 69 as well as the destroyers Picking, Sproston, Isherwood, William D. Porter, Charles J. Badger and Kimberly of Destroyer Squadron 49. They arrived in the area of Kerama Retto on 26 March, and while the troops quickly secured the islands, Oberrender was placed on anti-submarine patrol. On the night of 29 March her lookouts spotted a Japanese G4M Betty bomber, flying above the transports she was escorting for the night. This was Oberrender's first Japanese aircraft sighting of the campaign. She fruitlessly fired 20 mm rounds at the aircraft, which did not attack.

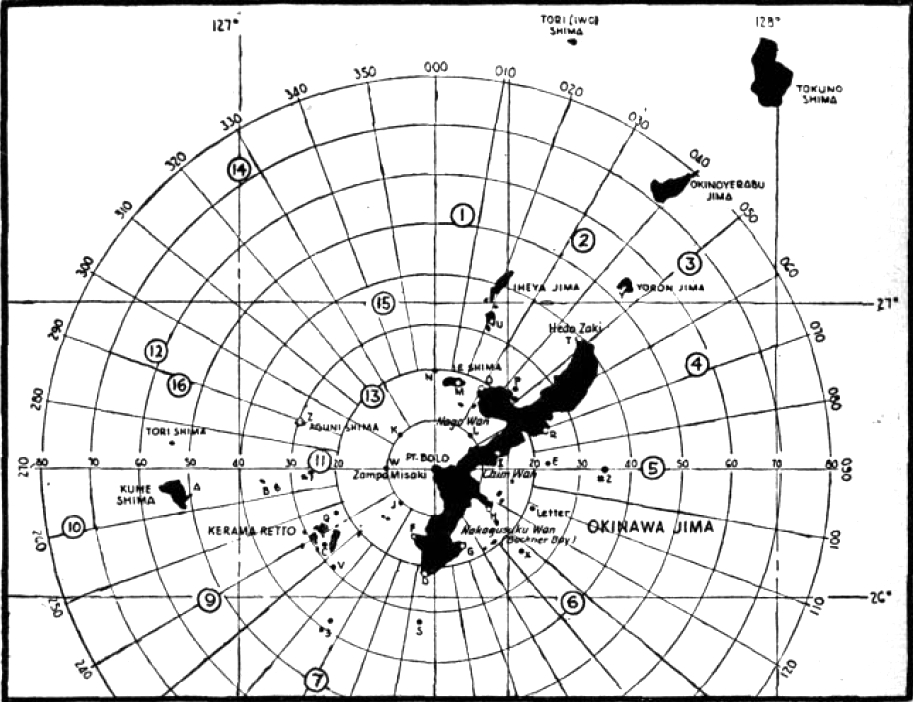
Radar picket stations during the Battle of Okinawa. The outer anti-submarine screen, where Oberrender was attacked, began at the Motobu Peninsula, went around Kerama Retto, and ended off southeast Okinawa.

When the invasion of Okinawa began on 1 April, known as L-Day, the task unit was dissolved and Task Group 51.5 under Captain Frederick Moosbrugger assumed control of the screen, in the waters surrounding the island, including Oberrender on anti-submarine patrol. Air attacks became more frequent, but she remained untouched, driving off a Zero and a D3A Val dive bomber with her AA fire in two separate actions on 2 April. A day later, the ship stood alongside fellow destroyer escort Foreman was damaged by a bomb, and she temporarily left her patrol station to escort the attack transport Kenton into Hagushi Bay. Oberrender departed Okinawa to escort attack transports returning to Saipan on 5 April, returning to Okinawa after a stopover at Ulithi on 17 April.

Back in the Okinawa vicinity, she and fellow destroyer escort England operated as an anti-submarine hunter-killer group for the next several days, on one occasion firing her Hedgehog (weapon) at several contacts that turned out to be schools of fish. After returning to her patrol station separately from England in late April, Oberrender briefly returned to the Kerama Islands for resupply on 30 April, then resumed her station later that day. For the next few days, the routine of patrolling was broken by the escort of transports from Hagushi Beach to Nakagusuku Bay on 2 May and a fruitless engagement with a G3M Nell bomber.

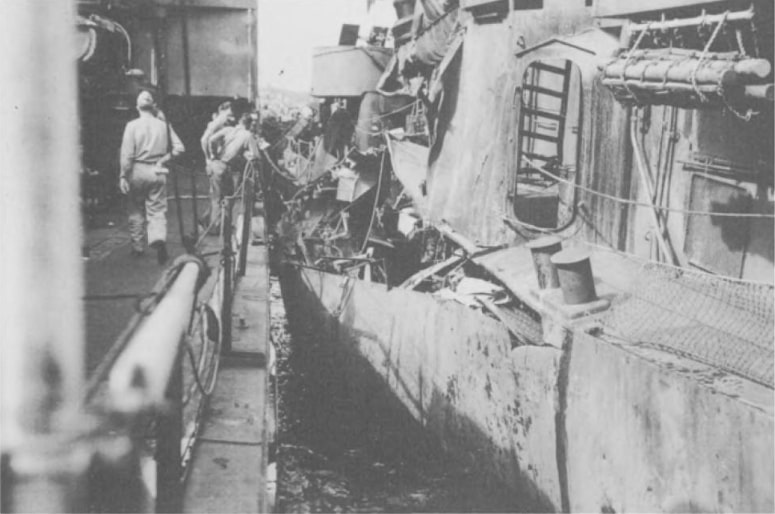
Starboard side damage near forward fireroom

While stationed with the outer anti-submarine screen to the west of the island on 9 May, Oberrender went to general quarters after receiving a report of an approaching kamikaze attack at 18:40. After picking up a lone Japanese aircraft on her radar ten minutes later, she increased to flank speed. Her lookouts sighted the plane at 18:52, and it entered a dive toward the ship. One of its wings was torn off by her anti-aircraft fire, causing the aircraft to veer to the right, but it still crashed into the starboard 20 mm mount, destroying the latter. The bomb carried by the aircraft penetrated the main deck and exploded in the forward fireroom, knocking out power and leaving her dead in the water. The explosion heavily damaged the ship and nearly broke her in half, blowing the starboard hull plating outwards for a quarter of her length and pushing up the main deck. In the attack, eight men were killed and fifty-three wounded; (Note: DANFS states that casualties totaled 24, but Morison and Spencer's after-action report state the figure provided in the main text.) those killed were either in the forward fireroom or the 20 mm mount that the plane crashed into. Oberrender transferred her wounded to rescue patrol craft escort PCE(R)-855 and was towed to Kerama Retto by the fleet tug Tekesta. Declared to be a constructive total loss, she was decommissioned on 11 July and struck from the Naval Vessel Register on 25 July. Her serviceable equipment was removed and the hulk was used as a target for gunnery practice, being sunk on 6 November 1945.

== Awards ==
Oberrender received three battle stars for World War II service, one each for her participation in the Leyte landings, the Lingayen Gulf Landing, and the assault and occupation of Okinawa.
