= List of NCAA football programs at Catholic colleges =

This is a list of Catholic colleges of the National Collegiate Athletic Association (NCAA) that have football as a varsity sport in the United States. It also includes a list of Catholic colleges and universities which previously had major football programs.

For current programs, all conference affiliations are current for the next football season of 2026.

== NCAA Division I Football Bowl Subdivision ==
School	Nickname	City	State	Conference
Boston College	Eagles	Chestnut Hill	Massachusetts	ACC
Notre Dame	Fighting Irish	South Bend	Indiana	Independent

== NCAA Division I Football Championship Subdivision ==
School	Nickname	City	State	Conference
Dayton	Flyers	Dayton	Ohio	Pioneer
Duquesne	Dukes	Pittsburgh	Pennsylvania	Northeast
Fordham	Rams	New York City	New York	Patriot
Georgetown	Hoyas	Washington	District of Columbia	Patriot
Holy Cross	Crusaders	Worcester	Massachusetts	Patriot
Incarnate Word	Cardinals	San Antonio	Texas	Southland
Mercyhurst	Lakers	Erie	Pennsylvania	Northeast
Merrimack	Warriors	North Andover	Massachusetts	D-1 Independent
Sacred Heart	Pioneers	Fairfield	Connecticut	CAA
San Diego	Toreros	San Diego	California	Pioneer
St. Thomas	Tommies	St. Paul	Minnesota	Pioneer
Stonehill	Skyhawks	Easton	Massachusetts	Northeast
Villanova	Wildcats	Villanova	Pennsylvania	CAA

== NCAA Division II ==
School	Nickname	City	State	Conference
Assumption	Greyhounds	Worcester	Massachusetts	Northeast-10
Gannon	Golden Knights	Erie	Pennsylvania	PSAC
Mary	Marauders	Bismarck	North Dakota	NSIC
Ohio Dominican	Panthers	Columbus	Ohio	G-MAC
Quincy	Hawks	Quincy	Illinois	GLVC
Saint Anselm	Hawks	Goffstown	New Hampshire	Northeast-10
Seton Hill	Griffins	Greensburg	Pennsylvania	PSAC
Thomas More	Saints	Crestview Hills	Kentucky	G-MAC
Walsh	Cavaliers	Canton	Ohio	G-MAC
Wheeling	Cardinals	Wheeling	West Virginia	MEC

== NCAA Division III ==
School	Nickname	City	State	Conference
Alvernia	Golden Wolves	Reading	Pennsylvania	MAC
Benedictine	Eagles	Lisle	Illinois	NACC
Catholic	Cardinals	Washington	District of Columbia	Landmark
John Carroll	Blue Streaks	University Heights	Ohio	OAC
Hilbert	Hawks	Hamburg	New York	Liberty League
King's	Monarchs	Wilkes-Barre	Pennsylvania	MAC
Loras	Duhawks	Dubuque	Iowa	ARC
Misericordia	Cougars	Dallas	Pennsylvania	MAC
Mount St. Joseph	Lions	Cincinnati	Ohio	HCAC
Saint Francis	Red Flash	Loretto	Pennsylvania	PAC
St. John's	Johnnies	Collegeville	Minnesota	MIAC
St. John Fisher	Cardinals	Pittsford	New York	Empire 8
St. Norbert	Green Knights	De Pere	Wisconsin	NACC
St. Scholastica	Saints	Duluth	Minnesota	MIAC
St. Vincent	Bearcats	Latrobe	Pennsylvania	PAC
Salve Regina	Seahawks	Newport	Rhode Island	NEWMAC

== Disbanded programs ==
School	Nickname	City	State	Years
Anna Maria	Amcats	Paxton	Massashusetts	2009–2025
Canisius	Golden Griffins	Buffalo	New York	1918–1949; 1975–2002
Creighton	Bluejays	Omaha	Nebraska	1900–1942
DePaul	Blue Demons	Chicago	Illinois	–1939
Detroit Mercy	Titans	Detroit	Michigan	1896–1963
Gonzaga	Gonzaga Bulldogs football	Spokane	Washington	1892–1941
La Salle	Explorers	Philadelphia	Pennsylvania	1931–2007
Loyola Marymount	Loyola	Los Angeles	California	1889–1951
Loyola New Orleans	Wolf Pack	New Orleans	Louisiana	1921-1939
Manhattan	Manhattan	New York City	New York	1924–1942
Marquette	Golden Avalanche	Milwaukee	Wisconsin	1892–1960
Notre Dame (OH)	Falcons	South Euclid	Ohio	2009–2023
Portland	Pilots	Portland	Oregon	–1949
Rockhurst	Hawks	Kansas City	Missouri	1927–1949
Saint Louis	Billikens	St. Louis	Missouri	1899–1949
St. Joseph's (IN)	Pumas	Rensselaer	Indiana	1896–2017
Saint Mary's (CA)	Gaels	Moraga	California	1892–1950; 1993–2003
San Francisco	Dons	San Francisco	California	1917–1951; 1958–1982
Santa Clara	Broncos	Santa Clara	California	1896–1952; 1959–1992
Xavier	Musketeers	Cincinnati	Ohio	1901–1973

== See also ==
- List of NCAA Division I FBS football programs
- List of NCAA Division I FCS football programs
- List of NCAA Division II football programs
- List of NCAA Division III football programs
