= Samuel Spencer (DC commissioner) =

American politician (1910–1997)

20th President of the Board of Commissioners of Washington, D.C.
- In office April 6, 1953 – April 6, 1956
- President: Dwight D. Eisenhower
- Preceded by: F. Joseph Donohue
- Succeeded by: Robert E. McLaughlin

Personal details
- Born: December 8, 1910 Washington, D.C., U.S.
- Died: March 23, 1997 (aged 86) Chevy Chase, Maryland, U.S.
- Resting place: Oak Hill Cemetery; Washington, D.C., U.S.
- Party: Republican
- Spouse(s): Dora White (died 1980) June Byrne (m. 1982)
- Children: 3
- Relatives: Samuel Spencer (grandfather)
- Education: Harvard University
- Profession: Lawyer; politician

Military service
- Branch/service: United States Navy
- Years of service: 1940-1946
- Rank: Commander
- Unit: Washington's Navy Reserve Battalion
- Commands: USS Oberrender
- Battles/wars: World War II; Battle of Leyte; Invasion of Lingayen Gulf; Battle of Okinawa
- Awards: Bronze Star; Service star x3

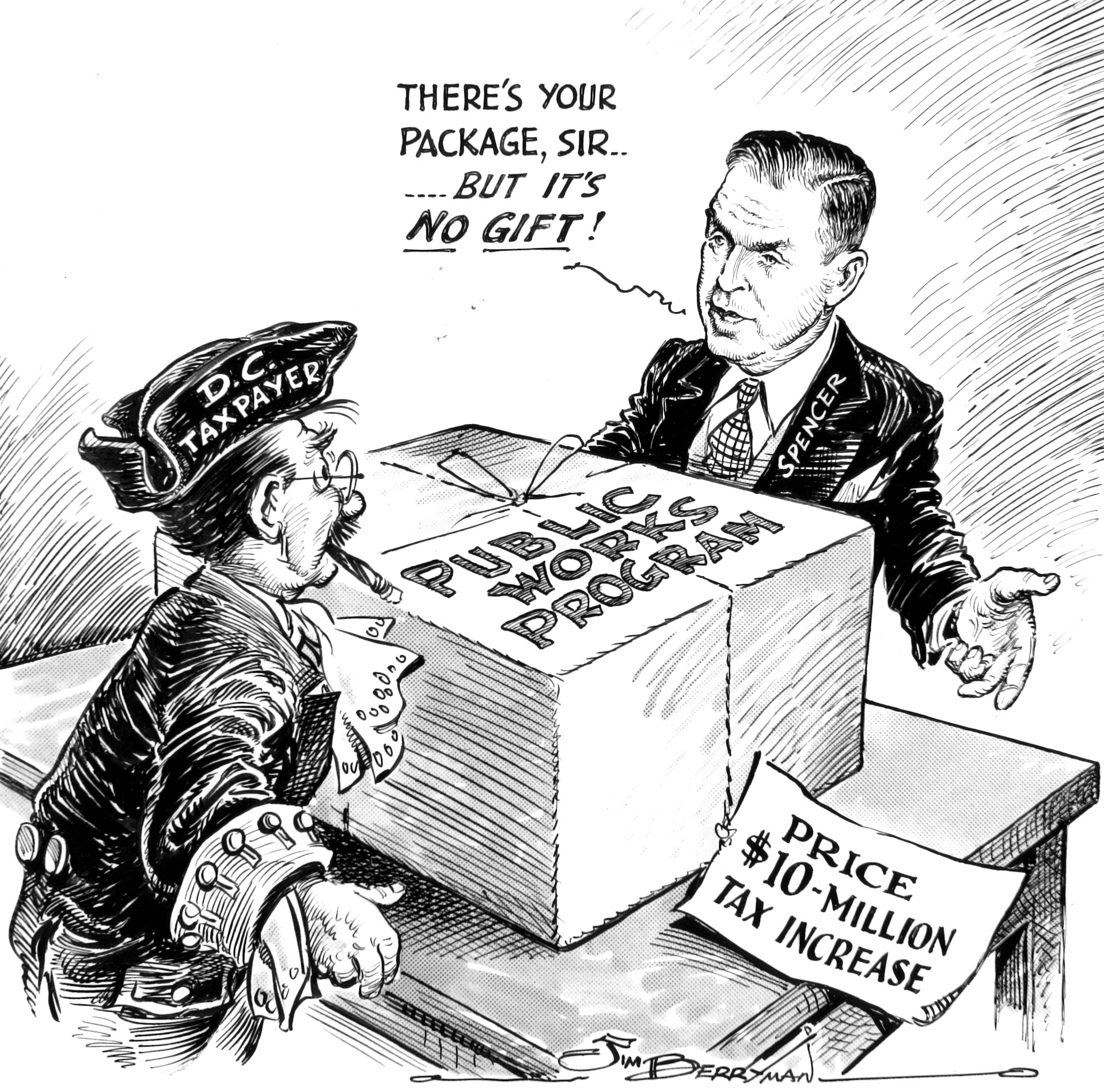
1953 cartoon depicting Spencer

Samuel Spencer (December 8, 1910 – March 23, 1997) was a politician from Washington, D.C., who served as the 20th president of the Board of Commissioners of the District of Columbia, from 1953 to 1956. He was charged with, and credited with, carrying out President Eisenhower's plan to eliminate "every vestige" of racial segregation in the Nation's Capitol.

== Early life ==
Samuel Spencer was born in Washington, D.C., in 1910 and was named after his grandfather, railroad executive Samuel Spencer, "the Father of the Southern Railway System". He was the son of Henry Benning Spencer and Katherine Spencer. His father was also a prominent railroader who was President of Fruit Growers Express, a refrigerated rail concern.

Spencer was educated at Sidwell Friends School, St. Albans School for Boys, the Milton Academy and then Harvard University, where he graduated magna cum laude and Phi Beta Kappa in just 3 years. He stayed on at Harvard to get a law degree. After graduating in 1935 he went to work for the New York law firm of Sherman and Sterling. He married Dora White in the same year.

In 1937, he returned to Washington to practice law there. In 1940, during the build-up to World War II, joined the Navy Reserve as an Ensign and was deployed to Panama in early 1941.

By 1944, Spencer was a Lieutenant Commander in command of the destroyer escort Oberrender. He participated in the battles of Leyte, Lingayen and Okinawa. On May 9, 1945, off the coast of Okinawa, the Oberender was hit by a kamikaze plane, killing 10 sailors and injuring 30 and the ship was badly damaged. He received a Bronze Star for getting the ship, which had to be decommissioned, back to port.

After returning to Washington following the war, he started his own law firm.

== Public life ==
Spencer had limited political experience prior to his appointment. In 1947 he testified in favor of the Home Rule plan proposed by Rep. James C. Auchincloss and he also supported efforts to give the District representation at the federal level. In 1952 he was elected a pledged delegate for Dwight Eisenhower to the Republican's District convention and as a member of the GOP. Later that year, a few days after the election, Democrat F. Joseph Donohue offered to resign from the District of Columbia Board of Commissioners so that then president-elect Eisenhower could choose his own leader for the District. After a brief search he chose to nominate Spencer who was confirmed and seated in April 1953.

Under his leadership the board had several significant accomplishments. They issued an order directing agencies under its authority to no longer consider race, creed or color in hiring decisions and the board also established a policy of nondiscrimination in use of city facilities. By the time he left office, 2/3rds of city agencies were integrated. Spencer also oversaw the integration of DC schools following Brown v. Board of Education. He negotiated an end to the 1955 transit strike and transitioned the privately owned Capital Transit Company into the publicly owned DC Transit, which was the beginning of the end of the DC Streetcar system. He reorganized Emergency, Episcopal and Garfield city hospitals into what became Washington Hospital Center, which he later served as president of.

Eisenhower wanted to appoint him to a 2nd term, but Spencer declined and returned to practicing law. Like his father and grandfather he worked in the railroad industry, serving as president and chairman of the Tennessee Railroad until it was taken over by the Southern Railway in 1973. He then became a director of Southern. He also served for 25 years on the board of Riggs National Bank.

== Death and Honors ==
Spencer married Dora White. She died in 1980 and two years later he married June Byrne. Spencer died on March 23, 1997, of cardiac arrest at his home in Chevy Chase and was buried in Oak Hill Cemetery. He had three children, Henry B., Janet and Richard.

Political offices
Preceded by F. Joseph Donohue	President of the D.C. Board of Commissioners; 1953-1956	Succeeded by Robert E. McLaughlin
