= Mike Gutelius =

American football coach

Current position
- Title: Special assistant to athletic director
- Team: Catholic University
- Conference: Landmark

Coaching career (HC unless noted)
- 1992: Catholic University (assistant)
- 1990s: St. Norbert (assistant)
- 1999–2001: La Verne (assistant)
- 2001–2003: Wingate (assistant)
- 2003–2008: Concord (DC)
- 2009–2016: Lindsey Wilson (DC)
- 2017–2025: Catholic University

Administrative career (AD unless noted)
- 2026–present: Catholic University (assistant to AD)

Head coaching record
- Overall: 33–48
- Bowls: 0–1

Mike Gutelius is an American college football coach. He most recently served as the head football coach for the Catholic University of America, a position he held from 2017 to 2025. He is a 1992 graduate of the Washington, D.C. university; where he earned a degree with a major in politics and a minor in philosophy. His 2001 master's degree from the University of La Verne was in education with a special emphasis in athletic-educational issues.

While serving as defensive coordinator at Lindsey Wilson College, the team made three-straight NAIA Football National Championship playoff appearances and were ranked number one in the nation. Gutelius was the 2015 American Football Coaches Association NAIA Assistant of the Year. While at Lindsey Wilson, Gutelius coached 20 all-conference defensive selections. He has also coached at Concord University, Wingate University, the University of La Verne, St. Norbert College, and for a year immediately after graduation at Catholic University.

With his wife Kimberly, Gutelius has three children, Michael, Sam and Mary Katherine.

== Head coaching record ==
Year	Team	Overall	Conference	Standing	Bowl/playoffs
Catholic University Cardinals (New England Women's and Men's Athletic Conference) (2017–2022)
2017	Catholic University	5–5	3–4	5th	
2018	Catholic University	1–9	1–6	7th	
2019	Catholic University	2–8	2–5	T–5th	
2020–21	No team—COVID-19				
2021	Catholic University	6–4	4–2	3rd	
2022	Catholic University	6–5	5–1	2nd	L New England
Catholic University Cardinals (Landmark Conference) (2023–2025)
2023	Catholic University	5–5	3–3	T–4th	
2024	Catholic University	5–5	3–3	4th	
2025	Catholic University	3–7	2–4	T–4th	
Catholic University:		33–48	23–28		
Total:		33–48			
