= Walter Nathan Tobriner =

American diplomat (1902–1979)

Walter N. Tobriner
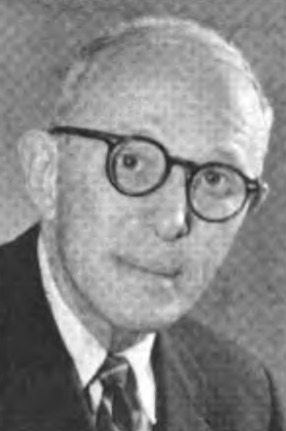

United States Ambassador to Jamaica
- In office December 11, 1967 – March 21, 1969
- President: Lyndon B. Johnson; Richard Nixon
- Preceded by: Wilson T.M. Beale, Jr.
- Succeeded by: Vincent de Roulet

President of the Board of Commissioners of Washington, D.C.
- In office March 3, 1961 – November 7, 1967
- President: John F. Kennedy; Lyndon B. Johnson
- Preceded by: Robert E. McLaughlin
- Succeeded by: Walter Washington (as Mayor-Commissioner)

District of Columbia Commissioner
- In office March 3, 1961 – November 7, 1967
- President: John F. Kennedy; Lyndon B. Johnson
- Preceded by: Mark Sullivan, Jr.
- Succeeded by: Position abolished

Personal details
- Born: July 2, 1902 Washington, D.C., U.S.
- Died: July 14, 1979 (aged 77) Washington, D.C., U.S.
- Resting place: National Memorial Park, West Falls Church, VA
- Party: Democratic
- Spouse: Marienne Smith
- Education: Princeton University, Harvard Law School
- Profession: Law professor, Diplomat

Military service
- Branch/service: Army Air Force
- Years of service: 1942-46
- Rank: Lieutenant Colonel
- Battles/wars: World War II

Walter Nathan Tobriner (July 2, 1902 – July 14, 1979) was an American politician who served as the 22nd and final president of the Board of Commissioners of the District of Columbia and a U.S. ambassador.

== Early life ==
Born in Washington, D.C., to a family with deep roots in the district. His father was a DC lawyer. Tobriner attended the Sidwell Friends School, but left for Princeton before graduating. At Princeton University, he graduated with a Bachelor of Arts degree in 1923, and received his law degree from Harvard Law School in 1926.

In 1927, Tobriner was admitted to the bar and began to practice law in the Washington, D.C., area. From 1927 to 1950, he was a professor of law at the National University School of Law.

On July 20, 1933, he married Marienne Smith.

During World War II, from 1943 to 1946, he served as a lieutenant colonel and legal officer in the Army Air Force. After the war he returned to DC and continued practicing law.

Tobriner served as the president of the board of the Garfield Memorial Hospital, from 1952 to 1955. In 1954, he was president of the board of the Lisner Home for Women. Tobriner acquired the position as director of the Blue Cross Plan in 1953 and maintained this position until 1961. He headed the board of the Washington Hospital Center from 1959 to 1961.

== Public life ==
Tobriner was appointed to the Washington Board of Education in 1952 and served from 1952 to 1961, the last four years as president. He was an early supporter of Civil Rights and following the Supreme Court's 1954 Brown v. Board of Education decision he advocated for speedy compliance with the decision and created a school integration system that became the model for the country.

He served as a delegate to the Democratic National Convention in the years 1956, 1960, and 1964.

In 1961 President Kennedy appointed him to the Board of Commissioners for Washington, D.C., where he served as president from 1961 to 1967, after being re-appointed by President Johnson. He found the three-member board awkward and inefficient and supported President Johnson's re-organization of the district government under a single mayor-commissioner and 9-member council. When the new government took effect, it made him the last president of the board of commissioners. As commissioner he ended the practice of arresting suspects without probable cause. He supported the re-organization of the police department and brought about fair housing and fair employment ordinances that sought to end racial discrimination. He supported a civil rights unit in the legal office and the creation of 2-year and 4-year public colleges in the district.

During his time on the board, he was, from 1964–67, a trustee of the National Cultural Center when plans for the Kennedy Center were drafted; and was, from 1966 to 1967, the chairman of the Washington Metropolitan Area Transit Authority, when the first contracts for the new subway system contracts were awarded.

From 1967 to 1969, Tobriner was the United States ambassador to Jamaica. When his service was over, the U.S. Department of State hired him as a consultant.

== Death and legacy ==
Tobriner died on July 19, 1979, and was buried at National Memorial Park in West Falls Church, Virginia.

His papers are held at George Washington University.

The "T.C." Collection: Early works of Theodore Dreiser collected by Walter N. Tobriner and presented to Roger S. Cohen is available in the Rare Book and Special Collections Division at the Library of Congress, (115 titles).

Diplomatic posts
Preceded by Wilson T.M. Beale, Jr.	United States Ambassador to Jamaica; 1967–1969	Succeeded by Vincent de Roulet
Political offices
Preceded by Robert E. McLaughlin	President of the Board of Commissioners of Washington, D.C. 1961–1967	Succeeded by Walter Washington (as Mayor-Commissioner)
