= George E. Allen =

American politician (1896–1973)

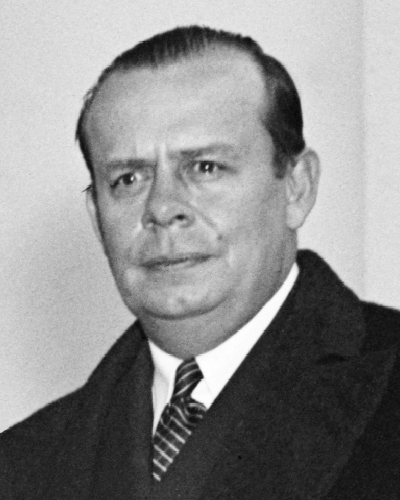
- Allen in 1937

Commissioner of the District of Columbia
- In office June 19, 1939 – April 15, 1940
- President: Franklin D. Roosevelt
- Preceded by: Vacant
- Succeeded by: John Russell Young
- In office November 16, 1933 – August 31, 1938
- President: Franklin D. Roosevelt
- Preceded by: Luther Halsey Reichelderfer
- Succeeded by: Vacant

Personal details
- Born: George Edward Allen; February 29, 1896 Booneville, Mississippi, U.S.
- Died: April 23, 1973 (aged 77) Palm Desert, California, U.S.
- Party: Democratic
- Spouse: Mary Keane
- Education: Cumberland University (LLB)

George Edward Allen (February 29, 1896 – April 23, 1973) was an American lawyer, businessman, and friend ("poker-playing intimate" and even "court jester") for U.S. presidents Franklin D. Roosevelt, Harry S. Truman, and Dwight D. Eisenhower. He was also head football coach of Cumberland University's football team during their famed lopsided match against Georgia Tech, losing 222–0.

== Background ==
George Edward Allen was born on February 29, 1896, in Booneville, Mississippi. He earned a law degree (LLB) at Cumberland University in Tennessee. In 1939, he earned an LLD.

== Career ==
=== Coaching ===
Allen as Cumberland College coach (circa 1916)

In 1916, Allen served as head football coach for Cumberland College Bulldogs in Lebanon, Tennessee, for one game, during which his alma mater Cumberland University suffered the greatest loss in the history of college football to Georgia Tech by a score of 222 to 0.

A favorite is his account of the Georgia Tech-Cumberland U. football game in 1916. Cumberland's fullback and captain, George Allen himself, made the best run of the game for his hard pressed side: "I only lost six yards." He would have made one beautiful punt if his own center had not blocked it with the back of his neck. George recalls: "I once dropped the ball and yelled at another fellow: 'Pick it up.' He yelled back at me, 'Pick it up yourself, you dropped it.'" The score: Tech, 222; Cumberland, 0.

Cumberland had actually discontinued its football program before the season but was not allowed to cancel its game against the Engineers. Georgia Tech coach John Heisman insisted on the schools' scheduling agreement, which required Cumberland to pay $3,000 (considered a sizeable sum in 1916 and roughly equivalent to $70,000 currently) to Tech if its football team failed to show.

George Allen (who was elected to serve as Cumberland's football team student manager after first serving as the baseball team student manager), also a Kappa Sigma fraternity member, put together a scrub team of 14 players to travel to Atlanta as Cumberland's football team and were soundly beaten 222 to 0, saving the college $3,000 in the process. Cumberland would not play football again until 1920.

==== Head coaching record ====
Year	Team	Overall	Conference	Standing	Bowl/playoffs
Cumberland Bulldogs (Independent) (1916)
1916	Cumberland	0–2			
Cumberland:		0–2			
Total:		0–2			

=== WWI ===
During World War I, Allen "wangled himself a commission in the US Army".

=== Law and business ===
Allen later practiced law in Mississippi and Indiana, afterwards engaging in various business ventures. In the 1920s he managed hotel properties in Washington, D.C. (including the Wardman Park Hotel) eventually drifting into politics and serving President Franklin D. Roosevelt and the Democratic Party.

=== Politics ===
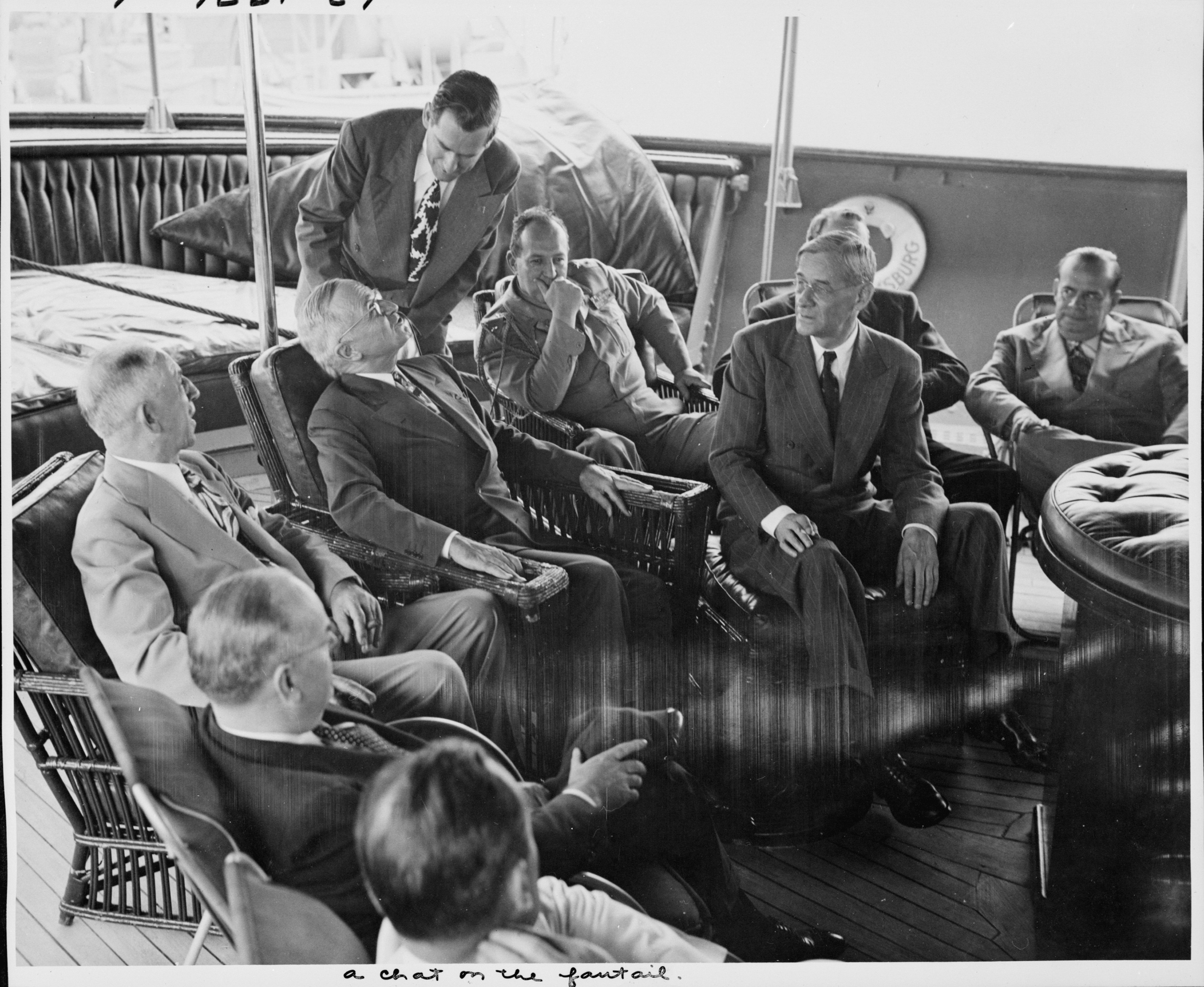
Allen (far right) aboard USS Williamsburg with President Truman (1946)

Allen "wangled himself" onto the Board of Commissioners for the District of Columbia (1933-1938, 1939–40) and treasurer and then secretary of the Democratic National Committee. In 1943, he served as chairman of the Democratic National Committee.

On behalf of the Red Cross, Allen made a number of trips to England and Europe where, in the 1940s, he and Dwight D. Eisenhower developed a friendship that grew over the ensuing years. Allen also served as a director of the War Damage Corporation, a government effort to provide insurance against war-related damage. In 1944, he "latched onto" Harry S. Truman, helped him secure candidacy as vice president, drafted his convention speech, and served as manager of his vice-presidential campaign. When FDR died in April 1945, Allen flew to Washington directly and helped draft the three speeches that Truman would deliver and oversaw Truman's transition into the presidency. Allen "managed the ticklish task of easing" Secretary of State Stettinius out in favor of James Byrnes. He helped the Truman administration in liquidating government war agencies. In 1946, he accepted an appointment as a director of the Reconstruction Finance Corporation, where he served through 1947. In accepting, he was carefully to avoid conflict of interest by dropping insurance directorships. Allen appeared on the cover of Time magazine on August 12, 1946, and was a subject of the cover story "The Regular Guys."

On July 2, 1948, the St. Louis Post-Dispatch reported that Allen would undertake to ask General Eisenhower for a "Sherman-like pronouncement that he would not run if nominated at the Democratic convention and would serve if elected" in the November 1948 US presidential elections. "This effort will be made with the 'full knowledge and acquiescence' of the President and his so-called 'Kitchen Cabinet' of political strategists."

=== Business, law, and political circles ===
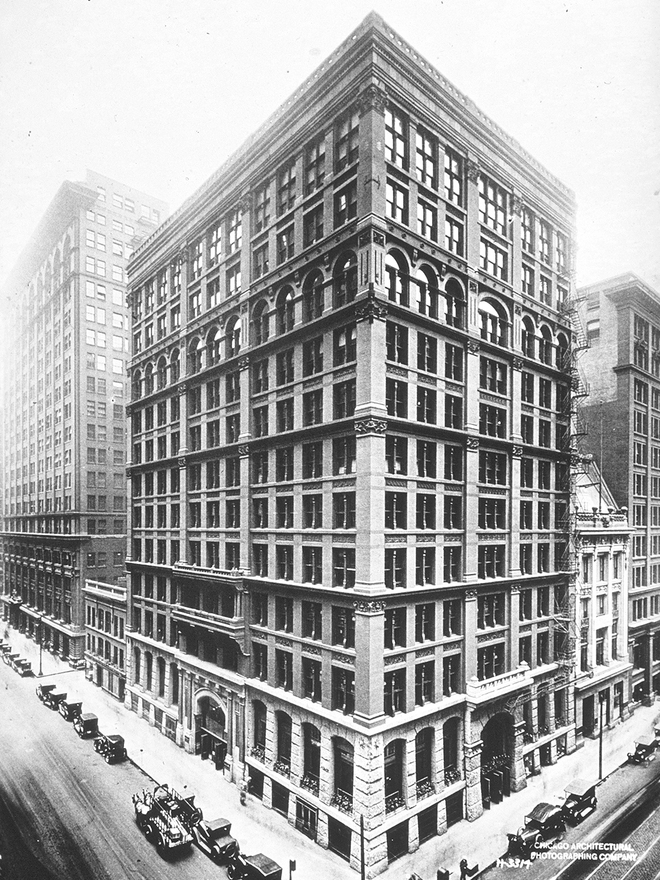
Home Insurance Building (built 1885 in Chicago), headquarters of the Home Insurance Company, which Allen helped save from scandal

Although Allen left government service with the end of the Truman administration, Allen remained in the public eye as a friend of President Eisenhower, a prominent member of "Ike's millionaires", a group of businessmen who socialized with Eisenhower in various leisure activities. Allen had a home in Gettysburg, Pennsylvania near Eisenhower's residence, and in 1959 Eisenhower stayed at Allen's home in La Quinta, California.

From 1947 to his death in 1973, Allen was an executive with several business corporations including AVCO, Inc. During the Eisenhower administration, he was part of a group known as "Ike's millionaires." By 1964, he held numerous corporate directorships. He was also an associate of the Washington, DC–based law firm of Alvord and Alvord (whose members included Jess Larson).

Time attributed Allen's success to his good humor: "George's job was Good Relations... George was a fixer and a puller of wires." He became vice president of the Home Insurance Company to help solve a fire insurance scandal. Numerous companies put him on their boards, including Victor Emanuel's Aviation Corp. and Consolidated Vultee Aircraft Corp., Tom Girdler's Republic Steel, General Aniline and Film Corp.

== Personal life and death ==
Harry Truman on George Allen:

- "Implicit confidence"
- "A regular guy, my friend George Allen"

In 1930, Allen married Mary Keane. They were living in the Wardman Park Hotel in the 1940s.

The press called Allen many names in his time, including: court jester, fat man, roly-poly, and clown. "He never seems to run out of funny things to say—scrupulously never tells anything off-color."

The press referred to Truman's close advisers as his "gang," prompters, and Kitchen Cabinet. In August 1946, Time magazine named his top four advisers as: "The Professor" John Roy Steelman, "The Lawyer" Clark McAdams Clifford, "The Banker" John Wesley Snyder, and Allen.

George E. Allen died age 77 on April 23, 1973, of a heart attack in Palm Desert, California.

== Legacy ==
The public library in Allen's home town of Booneville, Mississippi, is named the George E. Allen Library in his honor, and a major street is named "George E. Allen Drive".

According to the Eisenhower Library:

Though lawyer, businessman, and public servant, Allen was foremost known as a raconteur. This, along with mutual interests in golf, bridge, and farming probably formed the basis of the friendship between Allen and Eisenhower. The relationship was largely social and according to Eisenhower associates it was valuable to the President as an antidote to the stress of the office. The friendship continued through Eisenhower's retirement and Allen remained close to Mamie after Eisenhower's death.

== Works ==
Based on experience as a White House intimate, Allen wrote Presidents Who Have Known Me in 1950, and then wrote a revised edition in 1960.
