= Catholic University Cardinals football =

NCAA Division III college football team

- First season: 1895; 131 years ago
- Head coach: Kory David; 1st season, 0–0 (–)
- Location: Washington, D.C.
- Stadium: Cardinal Stadium (capacity: 3,500)
- Conference: Landmark
- Colors: Cardinal red and black
- All-time record: 324–368–15 (.469)
- Bowl record: 2–1–1 (.625)

Conference championships
- 2
- Consensus All-Americans: 2
- Website: CatholicAthletics.com

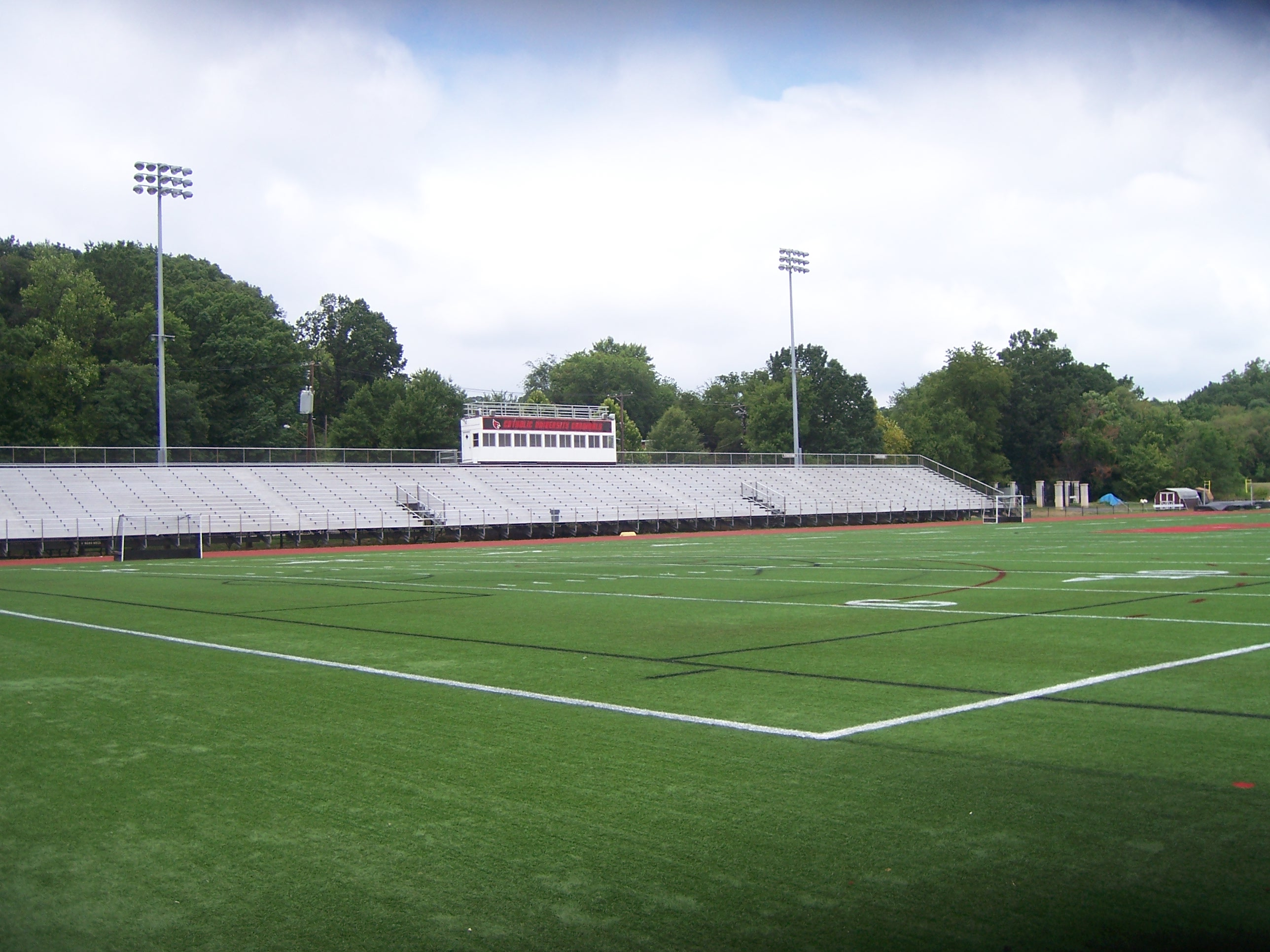
Cardinal Stadium

The Catholic University Cardinals football team represents the Catholic University of America in National Collegiate Athletic Association (NCAA) Division III college football competition as a member of the Landmark Conference. The team played its first game in 1895 and was a major college team in the first half of the 20th century, into the 1940s. The football program was put on hiatus during World War II, and then discontinued shortly afterwards. In 1965, football returned to the university at the club level, and, in 1977, re-entered NCAA competition as part of Division III. The Cardinals have participated in the Division III playoffs three times in the late 1990s and have secured two Old Dominion Athletic Conference (ODAC) championships. The head coach is Mike Gutelius.

== History ==
Catholic's first known intercollegiate football game came on Thanksgiving Day, November 28, 1895, in Emmitsburg, Maryland. They faced Mount Saint Mary's, of which six of the eleven Catholic players were alums. A contemporary article in The Mountaineer, the Mount Saint Mary's student newspaper, described it as being "rather warm for hard foot-ball playing, and consequently neither team seemed to play with much snap or vim." The Mountaineers scored a touchdown immediately before halftime to take a 4–0 lead. Catholic recovered a blocked field goal attempt and ran it back 92 yards for the equalizing score. Mount Saint Mary's later pulled away with a safety and a touchdown with two-point kick. The final result was 12–4.

In the 1920s, the Catholic "Red and Black" became known as the "Cardinals", sometimes expanded to the "Flying Cardinals" or, less often, the "Fighting Cardinals". Brookland Stadium/ Killion Field opened on October 4, 1924, and helped to increase the prominence of the football team. In 1930, Catholic secured former Minnesota assistant Arthur "Dutch" Bergman as their new head coach. During his tenure, Bergman scheduled teams farther afield such as Detroit, DePaul, South Dakota State, and St. Mary's (Texas).

In 1935, the Cardinals finished the regular season with a 7–1 record. The Catholic defense recorded three shutouts, allowed only 34 points, and no rushing touchdowns. The performance impressed the Orange Bowl committee enough for it to extend an invitation to play against Mississippi in the 1936 Orange Bowl. During the game, Bill Adamaitis caught a pass for the first touchdown and then threw for another score. He became the first of only three players to score both receiving and passing touchdowns in the same Orange Bowl. Ole Miss responded when Ned Peters ran for a 67-yard touchdown for a 13–6 halftime mark. In the second half, the Cardinals blocked a punt and returned it 20 yards for the score. Ole Miss recorded two more touchdowns, but missed the penultimate extra point, which proved Catholic's margin of victory, 20–19.

In 1939, Catholic achieved five shutouts in its 8–1 regular season record, and secured its second bowl game appearance. They faced Tempe Normal Teacher's College (now Arizona State) in the 1940 Sun Bowl. The result was a scoreless stalemate, unusual in the fact that the teams had scored a total of 512 points during the season. After the game, both coaches claimed to have the superior team to the media. Dixie Howell of Tempe said, "I believe we had the better team ... and would have won if we had gotten a break at the right time." Bergman responded, "Tempe is a fast, powerful team, but we didn't play our top game by any means ... I think we are capable of beating Tempe six days out of the week." During that game Washington Redskins player and future Pro Football Hall of Famer Wayne Millner served as an assistant coach.

From 1941 to 1946, football was discontinued due to World War II. Bergman finished his career at Catholic with a 59–31–4 record as the winningest coach in school history. He later coached the Washington Redskins in 1943, when they made an NFL playoff appearance. When the team was resurrected after the war, the Cardinals could not replicate their previous success. In four seasons, three different coaches posted a combined 7–18–2 record. The team was disbanded in 1950. A trial game was played against Saint Peter's College in 1965, and football revived the following year at the club level.

In 1977, varsity football returned to Catholic with its entry into NCAA Division III competition. The team joined the Old Dominion Athletic Conference (ODAC) in 1981, leaving the conference in 1989 to be a founding member of the Capital Athletic Conference (CAC). In 1997, the Cardinals, under head coach Tom Clark, made their first appearance in the Division III playoffs, losing 44–33 against Trinity. They returned to the playoffs in 1998, where they lost to Lycoming College, 49–14, In 1999, CUA returned to the ODAC and that season they secured the conference championship with a 6–0 conference record and made their third consecutive NCAA playoff appearance. They lost those NCAA playoffs to Western Maryland College (now called McDaniel College), 20–16.

In 2008, the Cardinals finished 4–2 in the ODAC and earned a four-way share of the conference title. Catholic earned a bid to the ECAC Southeast Bowl against Johns Hopkins and won, 18–17. It was the first postseason victory for the Cardinals since 1936. In 2011, Catholic's quarterback Greg Cordivari won the Melberger Award, for Division III's top football player in the nation.

The team joined the New England Women's and Men's Athletic Conference on July 1, 2017 as an affiliate member, and left after the 2022–23 season for the Landmark Conference.

=== Rivalry games ===
An important rivalry in Cardinals' history has been the game against the Division I Georgetown Hoyas, where the Steven Dean Memorial Trophy was in dispute. The series started at Brookland Stadium in 1976. There was a 16-year gap between the 1993 meeting at Cardinal Stadium and the 2019 season opener at Cooper Field. The record now stands with Georgetown having 10 wins and the Cardinals having nine.

== Achievements ==
=== Bowl games ===
Catholic University has played in four bowl games, two of which occurred during their tenure prior to the birth of separate Divisions for the NCAA. The Cardinals have a 2–1–1 record.

Season	Coach	Bowl	Opponent	Result
1935	Dutch Bergman	Orange Bowl	Ole Miss	W 20–19
1940	Dutch Bergman	Sun Bowl	Arizona State	T 0–0
2008	Dave Dunn	ECAC Southeast Bowl	Johns Hopkins	W 18–17
2022	Mike Gutelius	New England Bowl	Bridgewater State	L 24–34

=== NCAA Division III Playoffs ===
Year	Location	Opponent	Result
1997	San Antonio, Texas	Trinity	L 44–33
1998	Williamsport, Pennsylvania	Lycoming	L 49–14
1999	Westminster, Maryland	McDaniel	L 20–16

=== Conference championships ===
Year	Conference	Coach	Overall record	Conference record
1999	Old Dominion Athletic Conference	Tom Clark	9–2	5–0
2008	Old Dominion Athletic Conference	Dave Dunn	9–2	4–2

== Records ==
Latest season's W–L records:

Season	Overall record	Conference record
2025	7–3	2–4
2024	5–5	3–3
2023	5–5	3–3
2022	6–5	5–1
2021	6–4	4–2
2019	2–8	2–5
2018	1–9	1–6
2017	5–5	3–4
2016	3–7	0–7
2015	3–7	1–6
2014	3–7	1–6
2013	6–4	3–4
2012	3–7	2–5
2011	5–5	1–5
2010	4–6	2–4
2009	1–9	0–6
2008	9–2	4–2
2007	5–5	1–5
2006	3–7	1–5
2005	2–8	0–5
2004	0–10	0–5
2003	3–7	1–4
2002	4–6	2–3
2001	3–7	1–4
2000	6–4	4–2
1999	9–2	5–0

== See also ==
- List of NCAA Division III football programs
- List of NCAA football programs at Catholic colleges
