= Dutch Bergman =

American football player and coach (1895–1972)

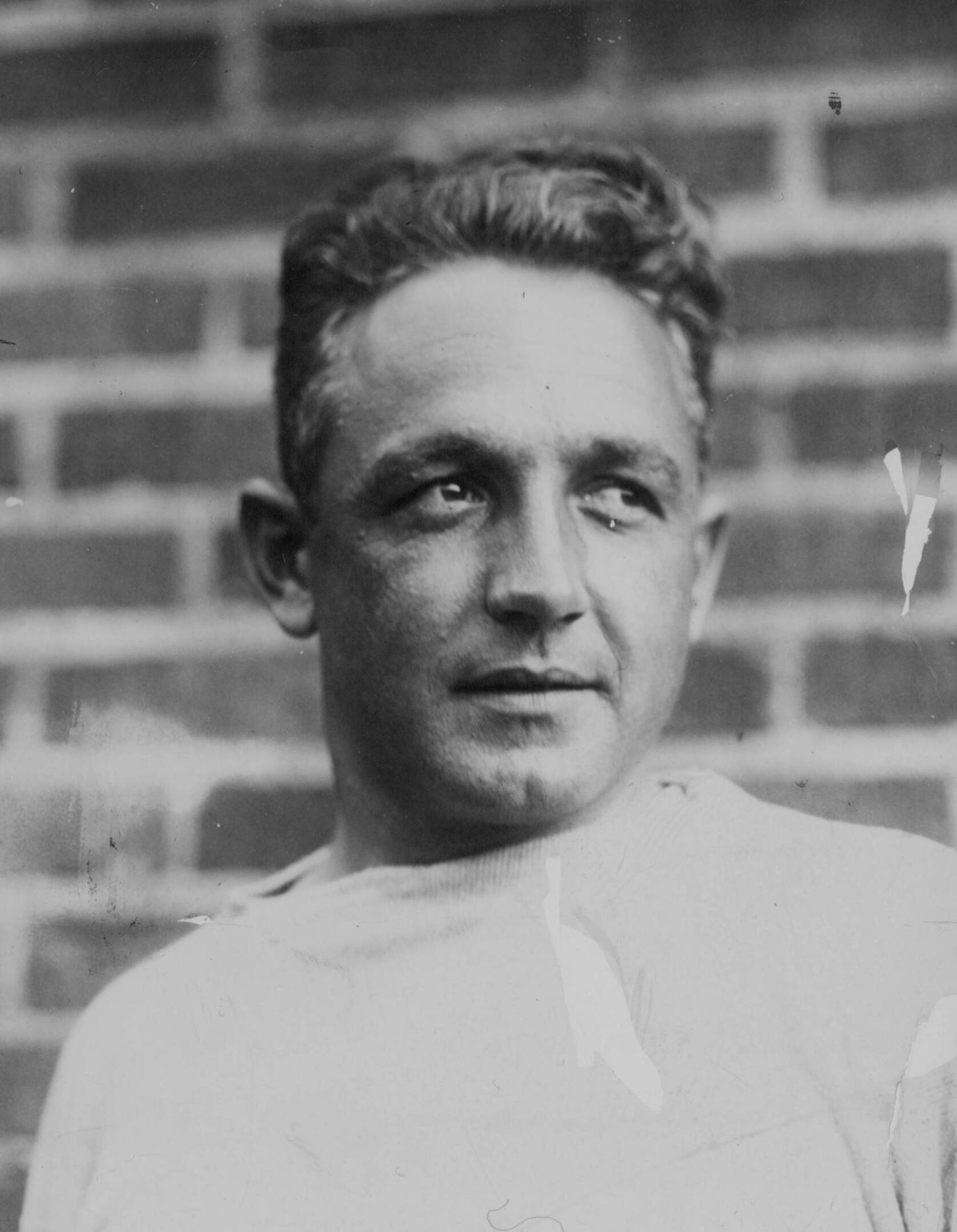
- Bergman in 1927

Biographical details
- Born: February 23, 1895; Peru, Indiana, U.S.
- Died: August 18, 1972 (aged 77); Washington, D.C., U.S.

Playing career
- 1915–1916, 1919: Notre Dame
- Position: Halfback

Coaching career (HC unless noted)

Football
- 1920–1922: New Mexico A&M
- 1924–1926: Dayton (assistant)
- 1927–1929: Minnesota (assistant)
- 1930–1940: Catholic University
- 1943: Washington Redskins

Basketball
- 1920–1922: New Mexico A&M

Baseball
- 1928–1930: Minnesota

Administrative career (AD unless noted)
- 1921–1923: New Mexico A&M

Head coaching record
- Overall: 71–36–5 (college football); 6–3–1 (NFL); 12–5 (college basketball); 27–34–1 (college baseball)
- Bowls: 1–0–1

Arthur J. "Dutch" Bergman (February 23, 1895 – August 18, 1972) was an American football player and coach. He served as the head football coach at the New Mexico College of Agriculture and Mechanic Arts, now New Mexico State University, from 1920 to 1922 and at The Catholic University of America from 1930 to 1940, compiling a career college football record of 71–36–5. Bergman was the head coach of the National Football League's Washington Redskins for one season in 1943, tallying a mark of 6–3–1.

During his tenure, the Cardinals went 59–31–4, including a victory in the 1936 Orange Bowl and a tie in the 1940 Sun Bowl. Bergman left the university when the sport was discontinued in 1941 because of World War II, later coaching the Washington Redskins to the 1943 NFL Championship Game, which they lost to the Chicago Bears.

Bergman is still the winningest varsity football coach in Catholic University history and was inducted into their Hall of Fame in 1982.

== Head coaching record ==
=== College football ===
Year	Team	Overall	Conference	Standing	Bowl/playoffs
New Mexico A&M Aggies (Independent) (1920–1922)
1920	New Mexico A&M	5–1–1			
1921	New Mexico A&M	2–2			
1922	New Mexico A&M	5–2			
New Mexico A&M:		12–5–1			
Catholic University Cardinals (Independent) (1930–1940)
1930	Catholic University	1–8			
1931	Catholic University	8–1			
1932	Catholic University	6–1–1			
1933	Catholic University	6–3			
1934	Catholic University	4–3–1			
1935	Catholic University	8–1			W Orange
1936	Catholic University	4–4			
1937	Catholic University	5–3			
1938	Catholic University	5–3			
1939	Catholic University	8–1–1			T Sun
1940	Catholic University	4–3–1			
Catholic University:		59–31–4			
Total:		71–36–5			

=== NFL ===
Team	Year	Regular season					Postseason			
Team	Year	Won	Lost	Ties	Win %	Finish	Won	Lost	Win %	Result
WAS	1943	6	3	1	.650	1st in NFL Eastern	1	1	.500	Lost to Chicago Bears in NFL Championship Game
