= 1940 Sun Bowl =

American college football game

- 6th Sun Bowl
Catholic University Cardinals	Arizona State Bulldogs
(8–1)	(8–2)
Independent	Border Conference
0	0
Head coach: Dutch Bergman	Head coach: Dixie Howell
	1	2	3	4	Total
Catholic University	0	0	0	0	0
Arizona State	0	0	0	0	0
- Date: January 1, 1940
- Season: 1939
- Stadium: Kidd Field
- Location: El Paso, Texas
- Favorite: 7–5, Catholic University
- Referee: Steve Coutchie
- Attendance: 12,000–13,000

The 1940 Sun Bowl was a post-season college football bowl game between The Catholic University of America (CUA) Cardinals and the Bulldogs from the Arizona State Teachers College at Tempe (now Arizona State University) on January 1, 1940. Despite predictions that it would be one of the highest scoring of any of the bowl games that year, it is the only scoreless tie in the history of the Sun Bowl.

== Regular season ==
Both were "Cinderella" teams, with Arizona State not having won a single in-conference game the season before and the Cardinals faced an "inauspicious preseason lineup." During the season Arizona State scored 212 points and gave up 56. CUA scored 299 and gave up 73. The game was supposed to decide "the old question of whether a good little team can beat a good big one."

=== Arizona State ===
Despite Arizona's State's troubles in 1939, they went undefeated in 1940 in Border Conference. Wayne "Ripper" Pitts was the leading scorer in the Border Conference. Pitts punted the ball 45 times during the season, and on 39 occasions the opposing team was not able to gain a single yard on the play. Before the game Joe Hernandez was "said to be impossible to catch" and scored touchdowns off three opening kickoffs.

The Bulldogs had two losses during the season, to Hardin–Simmons University and to the San Diego Marines. Coach Dixie Howell was credited for bringing his team "out of the so-so class and right into the Sun Bowl game at El Paso." Two years prior, when the "'miracle' coach" took the job, the team was "at the bottom of the conference heap."

=== Catholic University ===
CUA had a "colorful outfit" with the Piro brothers, Carmen and Rocco, a "trio of flashy halfbacks" including a "full blooded Indian," and "a drop kicking tackle called—of all names—Casmir Ksycewski (pronounced "Sneeze.)" Cardinals coach Dutch Bergman used a modified Notre Dame system by retaining the best features of the methods he learned from Notre Dame coach Knute Rockne and added some fancy ones of his own." As a result, commentators said, the "Cardinal attack is much more deceptive than the customary Notre Dame attack."

Had they gone undefeated, the Cardinals likely would have received invitations to the Orange Bowl, where they played in 1936, and to the Sugar Bowl, but they lost to Saint Anselm College at Fenway Park in Boston halfway through the season. St. Anselm did not play the week before "because the Cards were 'the' team on its schedule" and they wanted two weeks to prepare for them. After that loss, the Cards did "not lift a hand to get a bowl bid," and even after the reports that the team had accepted the invitation Bergman was not sure if they would.

== Lead up to the game ==
=== Invitation ===
As early as October news reports were talking about the Cardinals returning to the Orange Bowl in Miami, where they won in 1936 and where the team was "tremendously popular." A sports reporter for The Washington Post even went so far as to tell readers before Hallowe'en that he would "see you all in Miami New Year's."

Newspapers reported on December 2, 1939, that CUA accepted an invitation to play in the Sun Bowl, but as of that time no invitation had even reached Bergman. It was finally received on December 7, and accepted the same day. Previously, Georgetown University had been invited to play in the game, but they turned in down in hopes of a better offer. The Hoyas did not play in any bowl game that year.

The Teachers College had been selected "some time before" with the AP reporting they would play as early as November 29. As Border Conference champions, they automatically got a bid, and were officially invited at a banquet in Phoenix given in the team's honor.

=== Pre-game preparations ===
After accepting the invitation, the Cardinals had trouble practicing. Most of the players did not get out of classes until 4:30, and due to a cloudy streak the skies were dark by the time the players reached the field.

Bergman prohibited his players from going home for Christmas, but did plan a series of events for the players, including hosting a Christmas party and dance on December 23. At the party, Cod Fotton, the line coach and former player at Notre Dame, dressed up as Santa Claus.

A jukebox was procured for the party, but Bergman was "stumped" when he had to choose the records. He polled the team, and they chose, among others, "South of the Border" due to El Paso's proximity to Mexico, Silent Night, Jingle Bells, and "Jumpin Jive." Bergman "moaned" to The Washington Post that "you have got be a combined diplomat, coach, Toscanini and Shirley Povich these days to run a football team."

=== Trip to Texas ===
After word got out that the Cardinals had accepted an invitation to the game, so many railroad agents began calling upon Bergman that "the gym began to resemble an unemployment bureau." He then had the task of "diplomatically choosing" the cities to stop in along the way as scores sent invitations and wanted to host receptions for the team.

The Cardinals left in a snowstorm and traveled by way of St. Louis and Fort Worth, where they practiced as the guests of the Saint Louis Billikens and on the Texas Christian University campus. Snow in St. Louis forced the team to practice in the gymnasium, instead of on the field. In Missouri they picked up 60 gallons of mountain spring water to drink during the rest of the trip. In addition to the 33 players, five coaches and managers, three newspapermen made the journey.

After arriving in Texas, the Cardinals were feted at a banquet given by the Fort Worth Chamber of Commerce. While in Fort Worth, the Cardinals were coached by TCU's Sammy Baugh, a Washington Redskins teammate of Cardinals assistant coach Wayne Millner's. Both Baugh and Millner would eventually be inducted into the Pro Football Hall of Fame. The team was transported to and from the TCU stadium by members of the local Knights of Columbus. After their practice in Ft. Worth they were hosted in a luncheon at the Hotel Texas in which a large group of civic leaders, including members of the Knights of Columbus, Mayor T. J. Harrell, the president of TCU, and Amon G. Carter.

=== Welcome in El Paso ===
The CUA team made their way to El Paso where a welcoming committee of several hundred government and civic leaders met the train. The "gaily dressed" delegation, a group of cowboy-garbed, pistol-toting rancheros—a cowboy organization devoted to fancy shirts and spotted ponies," was on hand when the train pulled in at 6:30 a.m. Many wore 10-gallon hats and shot off six shooters, leaving the Cardinal team "open mouthed with astonishment."

The team was taken to the Hotel Cortez for breakfast where they were joined by 400 revelers for lunch, while an additional 200 were turned away. Later that day, the Optimist Club and 500 guests held a lunch in honor of Bergman, his assistant coaches, and co-captains Rocco Pirro and Al Calabrese. In attendance was Governor John E. Miles of New Mexico, Lt. Governor Coke Stevens of Texas, Congressman R.E. Thomason, several prominent citizens, and the 1939 Sun Bowl queen and her court.

The Bulldogs arrived a day later.

=== Sun Carnival ===
During the week before the game, El Paso celebrated the Sun Bowl Carnival with a theme of "Old Timers Day." There were 50,000 visitors in El Paso that week, and 25,000 were expected for the parade on New Year's morning. The daughter of Governor Bob Jones of Arizona was the grand marshal of the parade. The executive director of the Carnival was Dr. C.M. Hendricks.

Each member of the Sun Court was to represent an organization, but CUA did not admit female students at the time. Bergman coached at New Mexico State University from 1920 to 1923, and he called upon them to provide a co-ed to be CUA's proxy princess. The students of that school selected Mary Louise Armstrong. From the Sun Court, Jean Miller from Christian College in Columbia, Missouri, was chosen queen.

Howell was seen before the game "resplendent in a flowing red cowboy neckerchief."

=== Pre-game excitement ===
Every seat to the game, more than 15,000, was sold before it started. The local press was focused on the two fullbacks, the leading scorers in their respective conferences. Arizona State's most valuable player, Wayne "Ripper" Pitts, was described as "200 pounds of smashing, bruising, ball carrier and ace blocker," while Catholic's Rocco Pirro was called a "5-foot 10-inch and 185-pound Arizona jackrabbit."

Catholic was favored going into the game by 7–5 odds, despite Arizona State having "edges over their visitors and weight, speed and condition." The Washington Post columnist Jack Munhall told readers that "as the technical side of the game shapes up it should be a battle of Notre Dame offenses between a pair of comparatively small and exceptionally speedy elevens."

While in town for the game, the Cardinals stayed at the Texas State School of Mines and Metallurgy.

== Game summary ==
Arizona St.	Statistic	Catholic	Arizona St.	Statistic	Catholic
11	First downs	4	0	First downs penalties	0
11	First downs rushing	4	0	First downs passing	0
205	Total net yards gained	198	205	Net yards rushing	182
0	Total yards passing	16	7	Passes attempted	15
0	Passes completed	3	2	Passes intercepted	0
11	Punts	12	37	Yards per punt	35
3	Punt returns	3	6	Yards per return	4
4	Total fumbles	1	7	Penalties	6
65	Penalty yards	59			

While both teams were at full strength and it was predicted to be one of the highest scoring games of the year, it ended up being the only scoreless tie in the Sun Bowl history.

It was a "hard-fought but dull contest that provided little thrills" and one where neither team got within their opponents 5-yard line. Early in the game the Bulldogs were able to get inside the Cardinals' 10, but a series of bad passes ended their chances of scoring. A 54-yard drive by the Bulldogs was the longest of the day, and ended when they fumbled on the Cardinals' 48.

Game play was impeded by "gale-like wind," and only 16 yards were gained by passes. They were all thrown by Catholic's quarterback Pete Sachon, who had 15 attempts and three completions. None of the seven attempted passes made by the Bulldogs' quarterback Shamlen met their intended receiver as their "passing attack failed completely."

With less than two minutes left in the game, Arizona State missed a field goal from their own 42. Catholic took over the ball, but were stymied as "the desperate Bulldogs were pulling interceptions out of their hats."

Governor Bob Jones of Arizona was in attendance.

== Post-game ==
In post-game analysis, both coaches told the press they believed they had the better team. Dixie Howell said of his Bulldogs he believed "we would have won if we had gotten a break at the right time." Bergman called the game a "flop," saying his team "didn't play our top game by any means. I think we are capable of beating Tempe six days out of the week."

After the game, Knights of Columbus in El Paso took the Cardinals over the border for lunch in the "squalid but colorful Mexican town" of Ciudad Juárez.
