= Dave Bernard (American football) =

American football player (1912–1973)

Profile
- Position: QB / FB / LB

Personal information
- Born: September 26, 1912; Jefferson, South Dakota, U.S.
- Died: July 17, 1973 (aged 60); Montgomery, Alabama, U.S.
- Listed height: 5 ft 10 in (1.78 m)
- Listed weight: 194 lb (88 kg)

Career information
- High school: Sioux City (IA) Central
- College: Mississippi

Career history
- Cleveland Rams (1945–1946)

Awards and highlights
- NFL champion (1945)

Career statistics
- Games played: 13
- Completions / Attempts: 0 / 4
- Interceptions thrown: 2
- Rushing attempts / Yds: 1 / 6
- Stats at Pro Football Reference

David Edgar "King" Bernard (born September 26, 1912, died July 17, 1973) was an American football player who played two seasons in the NFL with the Cleveland Rams.

== Early life ==
Bernard was born in Jefferson, South Dakota and attended Central High School in Sioux City, Iowa.

He matriculated at the University of Mississippi (Ole Miss).

== Football career ==
Bernard played two seasons for the Cleveland Rams in 1944 and 1945. Previously, in 1942 he had briefly been on the roster of the Pittsburgh Steelers, but never saw action. Bernard also played in 1942 with the minor-league Wilmington Clippers of the American Association.
