= List of NCAA Division III softball programs =

The following is a list of schools that participate in NCAA Division III softball, according to NCAA.com. These teams compete for the NCAA Division III Softball Championship. (For schools whose athletic branding does not directly correspond with the school name, the athletic branding is in parentheses.)

Conference affiliations reflect those in the 2027 season. Years of conference changes, indicated in footnotes, reflect softball seasons, which take place in the calendar year after a conference change takes effect.

School	Nickname	State	Home field	Conference	National titles
Carlow University	Celtics	Pennsylvania	Lind Field	AMCC	None
Hilbert College	Hawks	New York	FSSJ Field Complex	AMCC	None
La Roche University	Redhawks	Pennsylvania	La Roche Softball Field	AMCC	None
Mount Aloysius College	Mounties	Pennsylvania	Mount Aloysius Softball Field	AMCC	None
Penn State Altoona	Nittany Lions	Pennsylvania	Stewart Softball Field	AMCC	None
Penn State Behrend	Lions	Pennsylvania	Penn State–Erie Behrend Softball Complex	AMCC	None
University of Pittsburgh at Bradford	Panthers	Pennsylvania	Kessel Athletic Complex	AMCC	None
University of Pittsburgh at Greensburg	Bobcats	Pennsylvania	Pitt-Greensburg Softball Field	AMCC	None
Buena Vista University	Beavers	Iowa	BVU Softball Field	American Rivers	1984
Central College	Dutch	Iowa	Central College Softball Field	American Rivers	1988, 1991, 1993, 2003
Coe College	Kohawks	Iowa	Clark Softball Field	American Rivers	None
University of Dubuque	Spartans	Iowa	UD Softball Field	American Rivers	None
Loras College	Duhawks	Iowa	Faber-Clark Field	American Rivers	None
Nebraska Wesleyan University	Prairie Wolves	Nebraska	University Place Park	American Rivers	None
Simpson College	Storm	Iowa	Simpson Softball Complex	American Rivers	1997, 1999
Wartburg College	Knights	Iowa	Lynes Field	American Rivers	None
East Texas Baptist University	Tigers	Texas	Taylor Field	American Southwest	2010
Hardin–Simmons University	Cowgirls	Texas	Ellis Field	American Southwest	None
Howard Payne University	Yellow Jackets	Texas	Lady Jacket Park	American Southwest	None
University of Mary Hardin–Baylor	Crusaders	Texas	Dee Dillon Field	American Southwest	None
McMurry University	War Hawks	Texas	Edwards Field	American Southwest	None
Schreiner University	Mountaineers	Texas	Mountaineer Field	American Southwest	None
Centenary University	Cyclones	New Jersey	Tannery Field	Atlantic East	None
Gwynedd Mercy University	Griffins	Pennsylvania	Gwynedd Mercy Softball Field	Atlantic East	None
Immaculata University	Mighty Macs	Pennsylvania	IU Softball Field	Atlantic East	None
Marymount University	Saints	Virginia	Barcroft Park	Atlantic East	None
Neumann University	Knights	Pennsylvania	Bruder Field	Atlantic East	None
Saint Elizabeth University	Eagles	New Jersey	SEU Softball Field	Atlantic East	None
Dickinson College	Red Devils	Pennsylvania	Dickinson Park	Centennial Conference	None
Franklin & Marshall College	Diplomats	Pennsylvania	Baker Campus Field	Centennial Conference	None
Gettysburg College	Bullets	Pennsylvania	Bobby Jones Field	Centennial Conference	None
Haverford College	Fords	Pennsylvania	Class of '95 Field	Centennial Conference	None
McDaniel College	Green Terror	Maryland	Green Terror Softball Park	Centennial Conference	None
Muhlenberg College	Mules	Pennsylvania	Cedarcreek Field	Centennial Conference	None
Swarthmore College	Garnet	Pennsylvania	Clothier Softball Field	Centennial Conference	None
Ursinus College	Bears	Pennsylvania	Eleanor Frost Snell Softball Field	Centennial Conference	None
Washington College	Shorewomen	Maryland	Washington College Softball Field	Centennial Conference	None
Baruch College	Bearcats	New York	Flowers Park	CUNYAC	None
Brooklyn College	Bulldogs	New York	Brooklyn College Field	CUNYAC	None
Hunter College	Hawks	New York	Randall's Island Park	CUNYAC	None
John Jay College of Criminal Justice	Bloodhounds	New York	Randall's Island Park	CUNYAC	None
Lehman College	Lightning	New York	Lehman College South Field	CUNYAC	None
York College, City University of New York	Cardinals	New York	Padavan-Preller Field	CUNYAC	None
Alverno College	Inferno	Wisconsin	Alverno Softball Field	Coast to Coast	None
Christopher Newport University	Captains	Virginia	Captains Softball Park	Coast to Coast	2022
Johnson & Wales University	Wildcats	North Carolina	Various	Coast to Coast	None
University of Mary Washington	Eagles	Virginia	UMW Softball Stadium	Coast to Coast	None
Regent University	Royals	Virginia	TBA	Coast to Coast	None
Salisbury University	Sea Gulls	Maryland	Sea Gull Softball Stadium	Coast to Coast	None
Augustana College	Vikings	Illinois	Carver Field	CCIW	None
Carroll University	Lady Pioneers	Wisconsin	Kilgour Field	CCIW	None
Carthage College	Firebirds	Wisconsin	Carthage Softball Field	CCIW	None
Elmhurst University	Bluejays	Illinois	Salt Creek Park	CCIW	None
Illinois Wesleyan University	Titans	Illinois	Inspiration Field	CCIW	None
Millikin University	Big Blue	Illinois	Workman Family Softball Field	CCIW	None
North Central College	Cardinals	Illinois	Shanower Family Field	CCIW	None
North Park University	Vikings	Illinois	Holmgren Athletic Complex	CCIW	None
Wheaton College	Thunder	Illinois	Ruth Leedy Field	CCIW	None
Agnes Scott College	Scotties	Georgia	Oakhurst Park	CCS	None
Asbury University	Eagles	Kentucky	Asbury Softball Field	CCS	None
Belhaven University	Blazers	Mississippi	McLeod Field	CCS	None
Covenant College	Lady Scots	Georgia	Covenant College Softball Field	CCS	None
Huntingdon College	Hawks	Alabama	Lucinda Samford Cannon Softball Field	CCS	None
LaGrange College	Panthers	Georgia	LC Softball Complex	CCS	None
Piedmont University	Lions	Georgia	Walker Athletic Complex	CCS	None
Wesleyan College	Wolves	Georgia	Mathews Athletic Complex	CCS	None
Curry College	Colonels	Massachusetts	D. Forbes Will Field	CNE	None
Endicott College	Gulls	Massachusetts	Endicott Softball Complex	CNE	None
Gordon College	Fighting Scots	Massachusetts	Gordon Softball Field	CNE	None
University of Hartford	Hawks	Connecticut	Hartford Softball Field	CNE	None
Johnson & Wales University	Wildcats	Rhode Island	Scotts Miracle-Gro Athletics Complex	CNE	None
Nichols College	Bison	Massachusetts	Nichols Softball Field	CNE	None
Roger Williams University	Hawks	Rhode Island	Paolino Field	CNE	None
Suffolk University	Rams	Massachusetts	East Boston Memorial Park	CNE	None
University of New England	Nor'easters	Maine	Nor'easter Diamond	CNE	None
Wentworth Institute of Technology	Leopards	Massachusetts	Carr Softball Diamond	CNE	None
Western New England University	Golden Bears	Massachusetts	Golden Bear Softball Park	CNE	None
Alfred University	Saxons	New York	Harrington Field	Empire 8	None
Elmira College	Soaring Eagles	New York	Holding Point Recreation Center	Empire 8	None
Hartwick College	Hawks	New York	TBA	Empire 8	None
Houghton University	Highlanders	New York	Houghton Softball Field	Empire 8	None
Keuka College	Wolves	New York	Keuka Softball Field	Empire 8	None
Nazareth University	Golden Flyers	New York	Flyer Field	Empire 8	None
Russell Sage College	Gators	New York	Plumeri Sports Complex	Empire 8	None
St. John Fisher University	Cardinals	New York	St. John Fisher Softball Complex	Empire 8	None
State University of New York at Brockport	Golden Eagles	New York	Clark V. Whited Complex	Empire 8	None
State University of New York at Geneseo	Knights	New York	Vic Raschi Softball Field	Empire 8	None
SUNY Polytechnic Institute	Wildcats	New York	Wildcat Softball Field	Empire 8	None
Utica University	Pioneers	New York	Greenman Softball Field	Empire 8	None
Albertus Magnus College	Falcons	Connecticut	Shea Softball Complex	GNAC	None
Dean College	Bulldogs	Massachusetts	Longley Athletic Complex	GNAC	None
Elms College	Blazers	Massachusetts	Condon Field	GNAC	None
Emmanuel College	Saints	Massachusetts	Roberto Clemente Field	GNAC	None
Lasell University	Lasers	Massachusetts	Taylor Field	GNAC	None
Mitchell College	Mariners	Connecticut	Mitchell College Softball Field	GNAC	None
New England College	Pilgrims	New Hampshire	Old Concord Road Field	GNAC	None
Norwich University	Cadets	Vermont	NU Softball Field	GNAC	None
Regis College	Pride	Massachusetts	Regis Softball Field	GNAC	None
Rivier University	Raiders	New Hampshire	Raider Diamond	GNAC	None
University of Saint Joseph	Blue Jays	Connecticut	USJ Softball Field	GNAC	None
Saint Joseph's College of Maine	Monks	Maine	Richard W. Bailey Field	GNAC	None
Simmons University	Sharks	Massachusetts	Daly Field	GNAC	None
Anderson University	Lady Ravens	Indiana	Raven Softball Field	HCAC	None
Berea College	Mountaineers	Kentucky	Berea College Softball Field	HCAC	None
Bluffton University	Beavers	Ohio	Bluffton Field	HCAC	None
Earlham College	Quakers	Indiana	Earlham Softball Field	HCAC	None
Franklin College	Grizzlies	Indiana	Behrens Field	HCAC	None
Hanover College	Panthers	Indiana	Kops-Bedel Stadium	HCAC	None
Manchester University	Spartans	Indiana	MU Softball Field	HCAC	None
Mount St. Joseph University	Lions	Ohio	Mount St. Joseph Softball Complex	HCAC	None
Rose–Hulman Institute of Technology	Fightin' Engineers	Indiana	Rose-Hulman Softball Field	HCAC	None
Transylvania University	Pioneers	Kentucky	John and Donna Hall Field	HCAC	None
Maranatha Baptist University	Sabercats	Wisconsin	Brandt-Quirk Park	Independent	None
Catholic University of America	Cardinals	Washington, D.C.	CUA Softball Field	Landmark Conference	None
Drew University	Rangers	New Jersey	Drew University Softball Complex	Landmark Conference	None
Elizabethtown College	Blue Jays	Pennsylvania	The Nest	Landmark Conference	None
Juniata College	Eagles	Pennsylvania	West End Field	Landmark Conference	None
Lycoming College	Warriors	Pennsylvania	Lycoming Softball Field	Landmark	None
Moravian University	Greyhounds	Pennsylvania	Blue & Grey Softball Field	Landmark Conference	None
Susquehanna University	Crusaders	Pennsylvania	Sassafras Softball Field	Landmark Conference	None
University of Scranton	Royals	Pennsylvania	Magis Field	Landmark Conference	None
Wilkes University	Colonels	Pennsylvania	Wilkes Softball Stadium	Landmark	None
Clarkson University	Golden Knights	New York	Scott Field	Liberty League	None
Ithaca College	Bombers	New York	Kostrinsky Field	Liberty League	2002
Rensselaer Polytechnic Institute	Engineers	New York	Doris Robison Field	Liberty League	None
University of Rochester	Yellowjackets	New York	Southside Field	Liberty League	None
Rochester Institute of Technology	Tigers	New York	RIT Softball Field	Liberty League	None
St. Lawrence University	Saints	New York	Saints Softball Field	Liberty League	None
Skidmore College	Thoroughbreds	New York	Wagner Park	Liberty League	None
Union College	Garnet Changers	New York	Alexander Field	Liberty League	None
William Smith College	Herons	New York	TBD	Liberty League	None
Eastern Connecticut State University	Warriors	Connecticut	Clyde Washburne Field	Little East	1982, 1985, 1986, 1990
Keene State College	Owls	New Hampshire	Owl Athletic Complex	Little East	None
Plymouth State University	Panthers	New Hampshire	D&M Park	Little East	None
Rhode Island College	Anchormen	Rhode Island	Dayna A. Bazar Softball Complex	Little East	None
University of Massachusetts Boston	Beacons	Massachusetts	UMass Boston Softball Field	Little East	None
University of Massachusetts Dartmouth	Corsairs	Massachusetts	UMass Dartmouth Softball Field	Little East	None
University of Southern Maine	Huskies	Maine	USM Softball Field	Little East	None
Vermont State University Castleton	Spartans	Vermont	Spartan Softball Field	Little East	None
Western Connecticut State University	Colonials	Connecticut	Westside Softball Field	Little East	None
Anna Maria College	Amcats	Massachusetts	AMCAT Softball Field	MASCAC	None
Bridgewater State University	Bears	Massachusetts	Alumni Park	MASCAC	None
Fitchburg State University	Falcons	Massachusetts	Coolidge Park	MASCAC	None
Framingham State University	Rams	Massachusetts	Maple Street Field	MASCAC	None
Massachusetts College of Liberal Arts	Trailblazers	Massachusetts	MCLA Softball Field	MASCAC	None
Massachusetts Maritime Academy	Buccaneers	Massachusetts	Alison Rollins Field	MASCAC	None
Salem State University	Vikings	Massachusetts	Alumni Field	MASCAC	None
Westfield State University	Owls	Massachusetts	Westfield State Softball Field	MASCAC	None
Worcester State University	Lancers	Massachusetts	Ralph Raymond Diamond	MASCAC	None
Adrian College	Bulldogs	Michigan	AC Softball Field	MIAA	None
Albion College	Britons	Michigan	Dempsey Field	MIAA	None
Alma College	Scots	Michigan	Scots Park	MIAA	None
Calvin University	Knights	Michigan	Calvin Softball Field	MIAA	None
Hope College	Flying Dutch	Michigan	Wolters Softball Stadium	MIAA	None
Kalamazoo College	Hornets	Michigan	Kalamazoo College Softball Field	MIAA	None
University of Olivet	Comets	Michigan	Olivet Softball Field	MIAA	None
Saint Mary's College	Belles	Indiana	Purcell Athletic Fields	MIAA	None
Trine University	Thunder	Indiana	SportONE/Parkview Softball Field	MIAA	None
Albright College	Lions	Pennsylvania	Albright College Softball Field	MAC Commonwealth	None
Alvernia University	Golden Wolves	Pennsylvania	Angelica Park	MAC Commonwealth	None
Eastern University	Eagles	Pennsylvania	Eastern University Softball Field	MAC Commonwealth	None
Hood College	Blazers	Maryland	Hood Softball Field	MAC Commonwealth	None
Messiah University	Falcons	Pennsylvania	Starry Softball Field	MAC Commonwealth	2009
Stevenson University	Mustangs	Maryland	Weinberg-Fine Stadium	MAC Commonwealth	None
Widener University	Pride	Pennsylvania	Widener Softball Field	MAC Commonwealth	None
York College of Pennsylvania	Spartans	Pennsylvania	Spartan Stadium	MAC Commonwealth	None
Arcadia University	Knights	Pennsylvania	Blankley Field	MAC Freedom	None
Delaware Valley University	Aggies	Pennsylvania	DVU Softball Field	MAC Freedom	None
DeSales University	Bulldogs	Pennsylvania	McGettigan Park	MAC Freedom	None
Fairleigh Dickinson University	Devils	New Jersey	McManus Field	MAC Freedom	None
King's College	Monarchs	Pennsylvania	King's Softball Field	MAC Freedom	None
Lebanon Valley College	Flying Dutchmen	Pennsylvania	LVC Softball Park	MAC Freedom	None
Marywood University	Pacers	Pennsylvania	Pacer Field	MAC Freedom	None
Misericordia University	Cougars	Pennsylvania	Anderson Field	MAC Freedom	None
Stevens Institute of Technology	Ducks	New Jersey	Weehawken Waterfront Park	MAC Freedom	None
Beloit College	Buccaneers	Wisconsin	Strong Complex Softball Field	Midwest	None
Cornell College	Rams	Iowa	Van Metre Family Softball Field	Midwest	None
Grinnell College	Pioneers	Iowa	Grinnell Softball Complex	Midwest	None
Illinois College	Lady Blues	Illinois	Jessica Kamp Softball Field	Midwest	None
Knox College	Prairie Fire	Illinois	Knox Softball Field	Midwest	None
Lake Forest College	Foresters	Illinois	Mohr Field	Midwest	None
Lawrence University	Vikings	Wisconsin	Whiting Field	Midwest	None
Luther College	Norse	Iowa	Betty A. Hoff Field	Midwest	None
Monmouth College	Fighting Scots	Illinois	Monmouth College Softball Field	Midwest	None
Ripon College	Red Hawks	Wisconsin	Tracy Field	Midwest	None
Augsburg University	Auggies	Minnesota	Edor Nelson Field	MIAC	None
Bethel University	Royals	Minnesota	Ona Orth Athletic Complex	MIAC	None
Carleton College	Knights	Minnesota	Ele Hansen Field	MIAC	None
Concordia College	Cobbers	Minnesota	Cobber Softball Diamond	MIAC	None
Gustavus Adolphus College	Golden Gusties	Minnesota	Gustavus Adolphus Softball Field	MIAC	None
Hamline University	Pipers	Minnesota	Meredith Field	MIAC	None
Macalester College	Scots	Minnesota	Macalester Softball Complex	MIAC	None
College of Saint Benedict and Saint John's University	Bennies	Minnesota	CSB Softball Field	MIAC	None
St. Catherine University	Wildcats	Minnesota	St. Catherine Softball Field	MIAC	None
Saint Mary's University of Minnesota	Cardinals	Minnesota	Saint Mary's Softball Field	MIAC	2000
St. Olaf College	Oles	Minnesota	Mabel Shirley Field	MIAC	None
College of St. Scholastica	Saints	Minnesota	Kenwood Field	MIAC	None
Amherst College	Mammoths	Massachusetts	Amherst Softball Field	NESCAC	None
Bates College	Bobcats	Maine	Lafayette Street Field	NESCAC	None
Bowdoin College	Polar Bears	Maine	Pickard Softball Diamond	NESCAC	None
Colby College	Mules	Maine	Colby Baseball and Softball Complex	NESCAC	None
Hamilton College	Continentals	New York	Loop Road Athletic Complex	NESCAC	None
Middlebury College	Panthers	Vermont	Middlebury Softball Field	NESCAC	None
Trinity College	Bantams	Connecticut	Trinity Softball Field	NESCAC	None
Tufts University	Jumbos	Massachusetts	Spicer Field	NESCAC	2013, 2014, 2015
Wesleyan University	Cardinals	Connecticut	Wesleyan Softball Field	NESCAC	None
Williams College	Ephs	Massachusetts	Cole Field	NESCAC	None
Babson College	Beavers	Massachusetts	Alumni Softball Field	NEWMAC	None
Clark University	Cougars	Massachusetts	O'Brien Softball Field	NEWMAC	None
Emerson College	Lions	Massachusetts	Rotch Field	NEWMAC	None
Massachusetts Institute of Technology	Engineers	Massachusetts	Briggs Field	NEWMAC	None
Salve Regina University	Seahawks	Rhode Island	Toppa Field at Freebody Park	NEWMAC	None
Smith College	Pioneers	Massachusetts	Smith College Softball Field	NEWMAC	None
Springfield College	Pride	Massachusetts	Potter Field	NEWMAC	None
United States Coast Guard Academy	Bears	Connecticut	Nitchman Field	NEWMAC	None
Wellesley College	Blue	Massachusetts	Wellesley Softball Field	NEWMAC	None
Wheaton College	Lyons	Massachusetts	Clark Field	NEWMAC	None
Worcester Polytechnic Institute	Engineers	Massachusetts	Rooftop Fields Complex	NEWMAC	None
Montclair State University	Red Hawks	New Jersey	MSU Softball Stadium	NJAC	None
Ramapo College	Roadrunners	New Jersey	Ramapo College Athletic Center	NJAC	None
Rutgers University–Newark	Scarlet Raiders	New Jersey	Frederick Douglass Field	NJAC	None
State University of New York at New Paltz	Hawks	New York	Mary Gray Deane Field	None	NJAC
William Paterson University	Pioneers	New Jersey	Pioneer Softball Field	NJAC	None
Kean University	Cougars	New Jersey	Cougar Softball Field	NJAC	None
Rowan University	Profs	New Jersey	Rowan Softball Field	NJAC	None
Rutgers University–Camden	Scarlet Raptors	New Jersey	Rutgers–Camden Community Park	NJAC	2006
Stockton University	Ospreys	New Jersey	Stockton Softball Field	NJAC	None
The College of New Jersey	Lions	New Jersey	Dr. June Walker Field	NJAC	1983, 1987, 1989, 1992, 1994, 1996
Husson University	Eagles	Maine	Robert & Frances O'Keefe Softball Field	North Atlantic	None
Lesley University	Lynx	Massachusetts	Griswold Park	North Atlantic	None
University of Maine at Farmington	Beavers	Maine	Prescott Field	North Atlantic	None
University of Maine at Presque Isle	Owls	Maine	Presque Isle Middle School Softball Field	North Atlantic	None
Thomas College	Terriers	Maine	Thomas College Softball Field	North Atlantic	None
Vermont State University Johnson	Badgers	Vermont	Minaert Softball Field	North Atlantic	None
Vermont State University Lyndon	Hornets	Vermont	Skip Pound Baseball & Softball Complex	North Atlantic	None
Denison University	Big Red	Ohio	Denison Softball Field	North Coast	None
DePauw University	Tigers	Indiana	DePauw Tiger Field	North Coast	None
John Carroll University	Blue Streaks	Ohio	Bracken Field	North Coast	None
Kenyon College	Ladies	Ohio	Kenyon Softball Complex	North Coast	None
Oberlin College	Yeowomen	Ohio	Dolcemaschio Stadium at Culhane Field	North Coast	None
Ohio Wesleyan University	Battling Bishops	Ohio	Margaret Sagan Field	North Coast	None
Wittenberg University	Tigers	Ohio	Betty Doughman Dillahunt Field	North Coast	None
College of Wooster	Fighting Scots	Ohio	Galpin Park	North Coast	None
Concordia University Wisconsin	Falcons	Wisconsin	Catalyst Park	NACC	None
Edgewood University	Eagles	Wisconsin	Ceniti Park	NACC	None
Lakeland University	Muskies	Wisconsin	Lakeland Softball Field	NACC	None
Marian University	Sabres	Wisconsin	Smith Field	NACC	None
St. Norbert College	Green Knights	Wisconsin	Mel Nicks Sports Complex	NACC	None
Wisconsin Lutheran College	Warriors	Wisconsin	Neumann Family Softball Field	NACC	None
Aurora University	Spartans	Illinois	Bedrosian Stadium	NACC	None
Benedictine University	Eagles	Illinois	Benedictine Softball Field	NACC	None
Concordia University Chicago	Cougars	Illinois	CUC Softball Field	NACC	None
Dominican University	Stars	Illinois	The Stadium at the Parkway Bank Sports Complex	NACC	None
Milwaukee School of Engineering	Raiders	Wisconsin	MSOE Athletic Field	NACC	None
Rockford University	Regents	Illinois	Softball Field 231	NACC	None
George Fox University	Bruins	Oregon	Curtis and Margaret Morse Athletic Fields	Northwest Conference	None
Lewis & Clark College	Pioneers	Oregon	Huston Sports Complex	Northwest Conference	None
Linfield University	Wildcats	Oregon	Del Smith Stadium	Northwest Conference	2007, 2011
Pacific University	Boxers	Oregon	Sherman/Larkins Stadium	Northwest Conference	None
Pacific Lutheran University	Lutes	Washington	PLU Softball Field	Northwest Conference	2012
University of Puget Sound	Loggers	Washington	Logger Softball Field	Northwest Conference	None
Whitworth University	Pirates	Washington	Diana Marks Field	Northwest Conference	None
Willamette University	Bearcats	Oregon	Willamette Softball Field	Northwest Conference	None
Baldwin Wallace University	Yellow Jackets	Ohio	BW Softball Field	Ohio Athletic	None
Capital University	Comets	Ohio	Clowson Field	Ohio Athletic	None
Heidelberg University	Student Princes	Ohio	Frann's Field	Ohio Athletic	None
Marietta College	Pioneers	Ohio	Marietta Softball Field	Ohio Athletic	None
University of Mount Union	Purple Raiders	Ohio	23rd Street Softball Field	Ohio Athletic	None
Muskingum University	Fighting Muskies	Ohio	Donna J. Newberry Field	Ohio Athletic	2001
Ohio Northern University	Polar Bears	Ohio	ONU Softball Field	Ohio Athletic	None
Otterbein University	Cardinals	Ohio	Otterbein Softball Field	Ohio Athletic	None
Wilmington College	Quakers	Ohio	WC Softball Complex	Ohio Athletic	None
Averett University	Cougars	Virginia	Cougar Field	Old Dominion Athletic	None
Batten University	Marlins	Virginia	Broyles Field	Old Dominion Athletic	2017, 2018, 2021
Bridgewater College	Eagles	Virginia	Fulk Field	Old Dominion Athletic	None
Eastern Mennonite University	Royals	Virginia	Gehman Field	Old Dominion Athletic	None
Guilford College	Quakers	North Carolina	Haworth Field	Old Dominion Athletic	None
University of Lynchburg	Hornets	Virginia	Aubrey R. Moon Jr. Field	Old Dominion Athletic	None
Randolph College	WildCats	Virginia	Randolph Softball Field	Old Dominion Athletic	None
Randolph–Macon College	Yellow Jackets	Virginia	R-MC Softball Field	Old Dominion Athletic	None
Roanoke College	Maroons	Virginia	Moyer Sports Complex	Old Dominion Athletic	None
Shenandoah University	Hornets	Virginia	Rotary Field	Old Dominion Athletic	None
Sweet Briar College	Vixens	Virginia	Sweet Briar Softball Field	Old Dominion Athletic	None
Allegheny College	Gators	Pennsylvania	Robertson Softball Field	Presidents' Athletic	None
Bethany College	Bison	West Virginia	Bison Field	Presidents' Athletic	None
Chatham University	Cougars	Pennsylvania	West Field	Presidents' Athletic	None
Franciscan University of Steubenville	Barons	Ohio	Franciscan Softball Field	Presidents' Athletic	None
Geneva College	Golden Tornadoes	Pennsylvania	Bill and Rita Conrady Softball Field	Presidents' Athletic	None
Grove City College	Wolverines	Pennsylvania	Grove City College Softball Field	Presidents' Athletic	None
Hiram College	Terriers	Ohio	Myrtis E. Herndon Field	Presidents' Athletic	None
Saint Francis University	Red Wolves	Pennsylvania	Red Wolves Softball Field	Presidents' Athletic	None
Saint Vincent College	Bearcats	Pennsylvania	SVC Softball Field	Presidents' Athletic	None
Thiel College	Tomcats	Pennsylvania	Softball Field at Tomcat Park	Presidents' Athletic	None
Washington & Jefferson College	Presidents	Pennsylvania	Brooks Park	Presidents' Athletic	None
Waynesburg University	Yellow Jackets	Pennsylvania	Waynesburg Softball Field	Presidents' Athletic	None
Westminster College	Titans	Pennsylvania	Westminster Softball Field	Presidents' Athletic	None
University of Mount Saint Vincent	Dolphins	New York	Valiants Field	Skyline Conference	None
Farmingdale State College	Rams	New York	Farmingdale State Softball Field	Skyline Conference	None
Manhattanville University	Valiants	New York	Manhattanville Softball Field	Skyline Conference	None
Mount Saint Mary College	Knights	New York	MSMC Baseball/Softball Complex	Skyline Conference	None
State University of New York at Purchase	Panthers	New York	PC Softball Field	Skyline Conference	None
Sarah Lawrence College	Gryphons	New York	Mary Levine Field	Skyline Conference	None
St. Joseph's University–Brooklyn	Bears	New York	LIU Softball Complex	Skyline Conference	None
St. Joseph's University–Long Island	Golden Eagles	New York	SJC Softball Stadium	Skyline Conference	None
State University of New York at Old Westbury	Panthers	New York	Jackie Robinson Athletic Complex	Skyline Conference	None
Yeshiva University	Maccabees	New York	Overpeck Park	Skyline Conference	None
Berry College	Vikings	Georgia	Kay Williams Field	SAA	None
Centre College	Colonels	Kentucky	Centre Softball Field	SAA	None
Maryville College	Scots	Tennessee	MC Softball Complex	SAA	None
Millsaps College	Majors	Mississippi	Millsaps Softball Complex	SAA	None
Rhodes College	Lynx	Tennessee	Rhodes Softball Field	SAA	None
Sewanee: The University of the South	Tigers	Tennessee	Tiger Field	SAA	None
Southwestern University	Pirates	Texas	Taylor-Sanders Field	SAA	None
Trinity University	Tigers	Texas	TU Softball Field	SAA	None
Azusa Pacific University	Cougars	California	Cougar Softball Complex	SCIAC	None
California Lutheran University	Regals	California	Hutton Field	SCIAC	None
Chapman University	Panthers	California	El Camino Real Park	SCIAC	1995
Claremont McKenna College, Harvey Mudd College, Scripps College	Athenas	California	Athena Field	SCIAC	None
University of La Verne	Leopards	California	Campus West Softball Field	SCIAC	None
Occidental College	Tigers	California	Bell Softball Field	SCIAC	None
Pomona College, Pitzer College	Sagehens	California	Pomona-Pitzer Softball Stadium	SCIAC	None
University of Redlands	Bulldogs	California	The Softball Field of Dreams	SCIAC	None
Whittier College	Poets	California	Palmer Field	SCIAC	None
Austin College	Kangaroos	Texas	Old Settlers Park	SCAC	None
Centenary College of Louisiana	Ladies	Louisiana	Centenary College Softball Complex	SCAC	None
Concordia University Texas	Tornados	Texas	Tornado Softball Field	SCAC	None
University of Dallas	Crusaders	Texas	Crusader Softball Field	SCAC	None
Hendrix College	Warriors	Arkansas	Warrior Softball Field	SCAC	None
LeTourneau University	Yellowjackets	Texas	LETU Softball Field	SCAC	None
University of the Ozarks	Eagles	Arkansas	Hurie Softball Field	SCAC	None
University of St. Thomas	Celts	Texas	WUSA Field	SCAC	None
Texas Lutheran University	Bulldogs	Texas	Morck Softball Field	SCAC	2019
Blackburn College	Beavers	Illinois	Blackburn Softball Field	SLIAC	None
Eureka College	Red Devils	Illinois	Sweitzer Field	SLIAC	None
Greenville University	Panthers	Illinois	Panther Field	SLIAC	None
Lyon College	Scots	Arkansas	Howard & Mary House Field	SLIAC	None
Mississippi University for Women	Owls	Mississippi	Don Usher Softball Field	SLIAC	None
Principia College	Panthers	Illinois	Principia Softball Field	SLIAC	None
Spalding University	Golden Eagles	Kentucky	Spalding Athletic Complex	SLIAC	None
Webster University	Gorloks	Missouri	St. Joseph's Academy Softball Field	SLIAC	None
Westminster College	Blue Jays	Missouri	Blue Jay Field	SLIAC	None
Alfred State College	Pioneers	New York	Pioneer Softball Field	SUNYAC	None
Buffalo State University	Bengals	New York	Buffalo State Softball Field	SUNYAC	None
State University of New York at Canton	Kangaroos	New York	SUNY Canton Softball Field	SUNYAC	None
State University of New York at Cobleskill	Fighting Tigers	New York	Fighting Tiger Softball Field	SUNYAC	None
State University of New York at Cortland	Red Dragons	New York	Dragon Field	SUNYAC	None
State University of New York at Delhi	Broncos	New York	Robert S. Brown Softball Field	SUNYAC	None
State University of New York at Fredonia	Blue Devils	New York	Blue Devil Field	SUNYAC	None
State University of New York at Morrisville	Mustangs	New York	SUNY Morrisville Softball Complex	SUNYAC	None
State University of New York at Oneonta	Red Dragons	New York	Red Dragon Softball Field	SUNYAC	None
State University of New York at Oswego	Lakers	New York	Laker Softball Field	SUNYAC	None
State University of New York at Plattsburgh	Cardinals	New York	Cardinal Park	SUNYAC	None
State University of New York at Potsdam	Bears	New York	Maxcy Softball Field	SUNYAC	None
Cairn University	Highlanders	Pennsylvania	G. Patrick Stillman Athletic Complex	United East	None
Cedar Crest College	Falcons	Pennsylvania	Cynthia L. Blaschak Field	United East	None
Clarks Summit University	Defenders	Pennsylvania	Clarks Summit Softball Field	United East	None
Gallaudet University	Bison	Washington, D.C.	Gallaudet Softball Complex	United East	None
Keystone College	Giants	Pennsylvania	Edmunds Field	United East	None
Lancaster Bible College	Chargers	Pennsylvania	Lancaster Bible Softball Field	United East	None
Notre Dame of Maryland University	Gators	Maryland	CCBC Dundalk Softball Field	United East	None
Pennsylvania College of Technology	Wildcats	Pennsylvania	Elm Park	United East	None
Penn State Abington	Nittany Lions	Pennsylvania	Huntingdon Field	United East	None
Penn State Brandywine	Lions	Pennsylvania	Maple Zone Sports Village	United East	None
Penn State Berks	Nittany Lions	Pennsylvania	Hintz Athletic Field	United East	None
Penn State Harrisburg	Nittany Lions	Pennsylvania	Courtney Pollock Memorial Softball Field	United East	None
University of Valley Forge	Patriots	Pennsylvania	UVF Softball Field	United East	None
Wilson College	Phoenix	Pennsylvania	Wilson Softball Field	United East	None
Brandeis University	Judges	Massachusetts	Marcus Field	University Athletic Association	None
Carnegie Mellon University	Tartans	Pennsylvania	CMU Softball Field at All-American Park	University Athletic Association	None
Case Western Reserve University	Spartans	Ohio	Mather Park	University Athletic Association	None
Emory University	Eagles	Georgia	Cooper Field	University Athletic Association	None
New York University	Violets	New York	CSI Softball Complex	University Athletic Association	None
University of Chicago	Maroons	Illinois	Stagg Field	University Athletic Association	None
Washington University in St. Louis	Bears	Missouri	WU Softball Field	University Athletic Association	None
Bethany Lutheran College	Vikings	Minnesota	Bethany Lutheran Softball Field	Upper Midwest Athletic	None
Crown College	Storm	Minnesota	Crown Softball Field	Upper Midwest Athletic	None
Martin Luther College	Knights	Minnesota	MLC Softball Field	Upper Midwest Athletic	None
University of Minnesota Morris	Cougars	Minnesota	Morris Softball Complex	Upper Midwest Athletic	None
North Central University	Rams	Minnesota	Xcel Field Park	Upper Midwest Athletic	None
University of Northwestern – St. Paul	Eagles	Minnesota	Reynolds Softball Field	Upper Midwest Athletic	None
University of Wisconsin–Superior	Yellowjackets	Wisconsin	NBC Spartan Sports Complex	Upper Midwest Athletic	None
Brevard College	Tornados	North Carolina	Brevard College Softball Field	USA South Athletic	None
Greensboro College	Pride	North Carolina	Barber Park	USA South Athletic	None
Mary Baldwin University	Fighting Squirrels	Virginia	Mary Baldwin Softball Field	USA South Athletic	None
Meredith College	Avenging Angels	North Carolina	Meredith Softball Complex	USA South Athletic	None
Methodist University	Monarchs	North Carolina	Don Price Field	USA South Athletic	None
North Carolina Wesleyan University	Battling Bishops	North Carolina	Edge Field	USA South Athletic	None
Pfeiffer University	Falcons	North Carolina	Jack Ingram Field	USA South Athletic	None
Salem College	Spirits	North Carolina	Blixt Field	USA South Athletic	None
Southern Virginia University	Knights	Virginia	Harvey-Dryden Field	USA South Athletic	None
William Peace University	Pacers	North Carolina	WPU Softball Complex	USA South Athletic	None
University of Wisconsin–Eau Claire	Blugolds	Wisconsin	Bollinger Field	WIAC	2008
University of Wisconsin–La Crosse	Eagles	Wisconsin	North Campus Field	WIAC	None
University of Wisconsin–Oshkosh	Titans	Wisconsin	UWO Softball Park	WIAC	None
University of Wisconsin–Platteville	Pioneers	Wisconsin	UW-Platteville Softball Complex	WIAC	None
University of Wisconsin–River Falls	Falcons	Wisconsin	Faye Perkins Softball Stadium	WIAC	None
University of Wisconsin–Stevens Point	Pointers	Wisconsin	McCarty Memorial Field	WIAC	1998
University of Wisconsin–Stout	Blue Devils	Wisconsin	Alumni Field	WIAC	None
University of Wisconsin–Whitewater	Warhawks	Wisconsin	van Steenderen Softball Complex	WIAC	None

== Future programs ==
School	Nickname	State	Home field	Future conference	Begins play	National titles
City College of New York	Beavers	New York	TBA	CUNYAC	2028	None
Saint Anselm College	Hawks	New Hampshire	South Athletic Fields	NEWMAC	2028	None

== See also ==
- List of NCAA Division I softball programs
- List of NCAA Division II softball programs
- List of junior college softball programs
