= List of former Middle Atlantic Conference members =

The following is an incomplete list of former members of the U.S. college athletic league now known as the Middle Atlantic Conferences (MAC). This includes schools that were members under the MAC's previous identity as the Middle Atlantic States Collegiate Athletics Conference.

One school which had departed the conference has since re-joined: Stevens Institute of Technology, which competed in the MAC from 1922–23 to 1977–78, returned back since the 2019–20 school year, joining the MAC's Freedom Conference.

== List of former members ==
=== Before the formation of the multiple leagues ===
| Institution | Location | Founded | Affiliation | Enrollment | Nickname | Joined (Note: Represents the calendar year when fall sports competition begins.) | Left (Note: Represents the calendar year when spring sports competition ends.) | Current conference |
|---|---|---|---|---|---|---|---|---|
| American University (Note: This school left the MAC to become a charter member of the East Coast Conference in 1974.) | Washington, D.C. | 1893 | Private | 12,442 | Eagles | 1965 | 1974 | Patriot (Note: Currently an NCAA Division I FCS athletic conference.) (Note: Non-football member.) |
| Bucknell University | Lewisburg, Pennsylvania | 1846 | Private | 3,655 | Bison | 1922 | 1974 | Patriot |
| Columbia University | Manhattan, New York City | 1754 | Private | 27,606 | Lions | 1938? | 1954 | Ivy |
| University of Delaware | Newark, Delaware | 1743 | Private, Public (Note: Delaware is officially chartered as a "privately governed, state-assisted" institution.) | 19,391 | Fightin' Blue Hens | 1922 | 1974 | Conf. USA (CUSA) (Note: Currently an NCAA Division I FBS athletic conference.) |
| Dickinson College (Note: This school left the MAC to become a charter member of the Centennial Conference in 1992.) | Carlisle, Pennsylvania | 1773 | Private | 2,300 | Red Devils | 1924? | 1992 | Centennial |
| Drexel University | Philadelphia, Pennsylvania | 1891 | Private | 25,500 | Dragons | 1922 | 1974 | Coastal (CAA) |
| Franklin & Marshall College | Lancaster, Pennsylvania | 1787 | Private | 2,324 | Diplomats | 1922 | 1992 | Centennial |
| Gettysburg College | Gettysburg, Pennsylvania | 1832 | Private | 2,600 | Bullets | 1922 | 1992 | Centennial |
| Haverford College | Haverford, Pennsylvania | 1833 | Private | 1,190 | Fords | 1922 | 1992 | Centennial |
| Hofstra University | Hempstead, New York | 1935 | Private | 12,400 | Pride | 1951 | 1974 | Coastal (CAA) |
| Johns Hopkins University (Note: Johns Hopkins had dual athletic conference membership with the University Athletic Association from 1986–87 to 1991–92.) | Baltimore, Maryland | 1876 | Private | 5,326 | Blue Jays | 1945 | 1992 | Centennial |
| La Salle University | Philadelphia, Pennsylvania | 1863 | Private | 7,554 | Explorers | 1951 | 1974 | Atlantic 10 (A-10) (Note: Currently an NCAA Division I non-football athletic conference.) |
| Lafayette College | Easton, Pennsylvania | 1826 | Private | 2,382 | Leopards | 1938? | 1974 | Patriot |
| Lehigh University | Bethlehem, Pennsylvania | 1865 | Private | 7,070 | Mountain Hawks | 1938? | 1974 | Patriot |
| Muhlenberg College | Allentown, Pennsylvania | 1848 | Private | 2,225 | Mules | 1922 | 1992 | Centennial |
| New York University | Lower Manhattan, New York City | 1831 | Private | 38,391 | Violets | 1922 | 1955 | University (UAA) |
| University of Pennsylvania | Philadelphia, Pennsylvania | 1740 | Private | 21,329 | Quakers | 1938? | 1954 | Ivy |
| Princeton University | Princeton, New Jersey | 1746 | Private | 7,567 | Tigers | 1922 | 1954 | Ivy |
| Rider University | Lawrenceville, New Jersey | 1865 | Private | 5,790 | Broncs | 1965 | 1974 | Metro Atlantic (MAAC) |
| Rutgers University–New Brunswick | New Brunswick, New Jersey | 1766 | Public | 58,788 | Scarlet Knights | 1922 | 1962 | Big Ten (B1G) |
| Saint Joseph's University | Wynnfield, Pennsylvania | 1851 | Private | 8,800 | Hawks | 1949 | 1974 | Atlantic 10 (A-10) |
| Seton Hall University | South Orange, New Jersey | 1856 | Private | 9,745 | Pirates | 1938? | 1956 | Big East |
| Swarthmore College | Swarthmore, Pennsylvania | 1864 | Private | 1,545 | Garnet | 1922 | 1992 | Centennial |
| Temple University | Philadelphia, Pennsylvania | 1884 | Public | 38,648 | Owls | 1938? | 1962 | The American |
| Upsala College | East Orange, New Jersey | 1893 | Private | 435 | Vikings | 1960 | 1995 | N/A (Note: Upsala closed after the 1994–95 school year.) |
| Ursinus College | Collegeville, Pennsylvania | 1869 | Private | 1,650 | Bears | 1938? | 1992 | Centennial |
| Wagner College | Staten Island, New York City | 1883 | Private | 2,400 | Seahawks | 1938? | 1975 | Northeast (NEC) |
| Washington College | Chestertown, Maryland | 1723 | Private | 1,450 | Shoremen (men's); Shorewomen (women's) | 1946 | 1992 | Centennial |
| West Chester University | West Chester, Pennsylvania | 1871 | Public | 14,950 | Golden Rams | 1938?; 1969 | 1951; 1974 | Pennsylvania (PSAC) (Note: Currently an NCAA Division II athletic conference.) |

=== Since the formation of the multiple leagues ===
| Institution | Location | Founded | Affiliation | Enrollment | Nickname | Joined (Note: Represents the calendar year when fall sports competition begins.) | Left (Note: Represents the calendar year when spring sports competition ends.) | Current conference |
|---|---|---|---|---|---|---|---|---|
| Drew University (Note: This school left the MAC to become a charter member of the Landmark Conference in 2007.) | Madison, New Jersey | 1867 | Private | 2,369 | Rangers | 1968 (Note: This school was a charter member of the MAC Freedom Conference when it began in the 1999–2000 school year.) | 2007 | Landmark |
| Elizabethtown College | Elizabethtown, Pennsylvania | 1899 | Private | 2,082 | Blue Jays | 1928 (Note: This school was a charter member of the MAC Commonwealth Conference when it began in the 1999–2000 school year.) | 2014 | Landmark |
| Juniata College | Huntingdon, Pennsylvania | 1876 | Private | 1,619 | Eagles | 1938? | 2007 | Landmark |
| Lycoming College | Williamsport, Pennsylvania | 1812 | Private | 1,272 | Warriors | 1952 | 2023 | Landmark |
| Manhattanville College | Purchase, New York | 1841 | Private | 2,700 | Valiants | 2007 | 2019 | Skyline |
| Moravian College | Bethlehem, Pennsylvania | 1742 | Private | 1,564 | Greyhounds | 1945 | 2007 | Landmark |
| University of Scranton | Scranton, Pennsylvania | 1888 | Private | 6,034 | Royals | 1938 | 2007 | Landmark |
| Susquehanna University | Selinsgrove, Pennsylvania | 1858 | Private | 2,200 | Crusaders | 1922 | 2007 | Landmark |
| Wilkes University | Wilkes-Barre, Pennsylvania | 1933 | Private | 5,552 | Colonels | 1946 | 2023 | Landmark |
