= 2015 NCAA Division III Field Hockey Championship =

Tournament details
- Country: United States
- Teams: 24

Final positions
- Champions: Middlebury Panthers
- Runners-up: Bowdoin Polar Bears

The 2015 NCAA Division III Field Hockey Championship will be the 35th women's collegiate field hockey tournament organized by the NCAA to determine the top Division III college field hockey team n the United States. The semifinals and championship match will be played at the Turf Field at Washington and Lee University in Lexington, Virginia, from November 21–22, 2015. W&L is hosting for the second consecutive year.

Middlebury defeated Bowdoin 1-0 in the final.

TCNJ are the defending national champions.

== Qualified teams ==
- A total of 24 teams qualified for the 2015 tournament. 19 teams received automatic bids by winning their conference tournaments and an additional five teams earned at-large bids based on their regular season records.

=== Automatic qualifiers ===
Conference	Champion	Record
Capital	Salisbury	14–3
Centennial	Ursinus	17–3
Colonial States	Cabrini	12–8
Commonwealth Coast	New England	16–6
Empire 8	Stevens Tech	13–7
Great Northeast	Simmons	14–4
Landmark	Catholic	13–6
Liberty League	William Smith	17–2
Little East	Keene State	16–7
MAC Commonwealth	Messiah	15–5
MAC Freedom	Misericordia	10–11
NECC	Becker	11–11
NESCAC	Bowdoin	18–0
NEWMAC	Mount Holyoke	15–6
NJAC	TCNJ	18–1
North Atlantic	Husson	8–9
North Coast	DePauw	15–4
ODAC	Bridgewater (VA)	12–8
SUNYAC	SUNY New Paltz	15–5

=== At-large qualifiers ===
Team	Conference	Record
Franklin & Marshall	Centennial	16–3
Middlebury	NESCAC	16–2
Rhodes	SAA	15–5
Rochester (NY)	UAA	16–5
Wellesley	NEWMAC	16–3

== Bracket ==
Play-In round November 11, 2015; Campus sites
Keene State*	1
Husson	0
New England*	3
Becker	1
Rochester (NY)*	2
Misericordia	1
Stevens Tech*	3
Mount Holyoke	1
Catholic*	1
Bridgewater (VA)	2
Franklin & Marshall*	5
Cabrini	1
SUNY New Paltz*	1
Simmons	0
Rhodes*	5
DePauw	1

Second round November 14, 2015; Campus sites
Bowdoin*	5
Keene State	1
New England	0
Wellesley*	3
Salisbury*	2
Rochester (NY)	3
Stevens Tech	0
Ursinus*	10
William Smith*	6
Bridgewater (VA)	0
Franklin & Marshall	0
Middlebury*	2
Messiah*	3
SUNY New Paltz	0
Rhodes	0
TCNJ*	3

Third round November 15, 2015; Campus sites
Bowdoin*	3
Wellesley	0
Rochester (NY)	0
Ursinus*	5
William Smith*	0
Middlebury	3
Messiah	2
TCNJ*	4

Semifinals; November 21, 2015; Lexington, Virginia; Turf Field
Bowdoin	4
Ursinus	2
Middlebury	4
TCNJ	1

Championship; November 22, 2015; Lexington, Virginia; Turf Field
Bowdoin	0
Middlebury	1

== See also ==
- NCAA Division I Field Hockey Championship
- NCAA Division II Field Hockey Championship
