= Ted Stratford =

American football player and coach (1942–2006)

Biographical details
- Born: August 8, 1942; Holyoke, Massachusetts, U.S.
- Died: November 29, 2006 (aged 64); Tupper Lake, New York, U.S.

Playing career
- 1953–1956: St. Lawrence

Coaching career (HC unless noted)
- 1969–1978: St. Lawrence
- 1979–1981: Hamilton

Head coaching record
- Overall: 66–47
- Tournaments: 1–2 (NCAA D-III playoffs)

Accomplishments and honors

Championships
- 1 ICAC (1969)

Edwin "Ted" Stratford III (August 8, 1942 – November 29, 2006) was an American college football coach. He served as the head football coach at his alma mater, St. Lawrence University in Canton, New York, from 1969 to 1978 and Hamilton College in Clinton, New York from 1979 to 1981, compiling a career head coaching record of 66–47.

== Head coaching record ==
Year	Team	Overall	Conference	Standing	Bowl/playoffs
St. Lawrence Saints (Independent College Athletic Conference) (1969–1978)
1969	St. Lawrence	7–1	3–0	1st	
1970	St. Lawrence	4–4	2–1	2nd	
1971	St. Lawrence	5–3	1–2	T–2nd	
1972	St. Lawrence	5–4	1–2	4th	
1973	St. Lawrence	5–3	2–2	3rd	
1974	St. Lawrence	7–2	3–2	3rd	
1975	St. Lawrence	7–2	3–2	3rd	
1976	St. Lawrence	9–2	4–1	2nd	L NCAA Division III Semifinal
1977	St. Lawrence	7–2	3–2	3rd	
1978	St. Lawrence	8–2	3–1	2nd	L NCAA Division III Quarterfinal
St. Lawrence:		64–25	25–15		
Hamilton Continentals (New England Small College Athletic Conference) (1979–1981)
1979	Hamilton	0–8			
1980	Hamilton	2–6			
1981	Hamilton	0–8			
Hamilton:		2–22			
Total:		66–47			
National championship Conference title Conference division title or championship game berth
