= Skyline Conference =

Athletic conference in New York, US

- Association: NCAA
- Founded: 1989
- Commissioner: Melissa Reiley
- Sports fielded: 17; men's: 9; women's: 8
- Division: Division III
- No. of teams: 12
- Headquarters: New York, New York
- Region: New York
- Official website: skylineconference.org

Locations
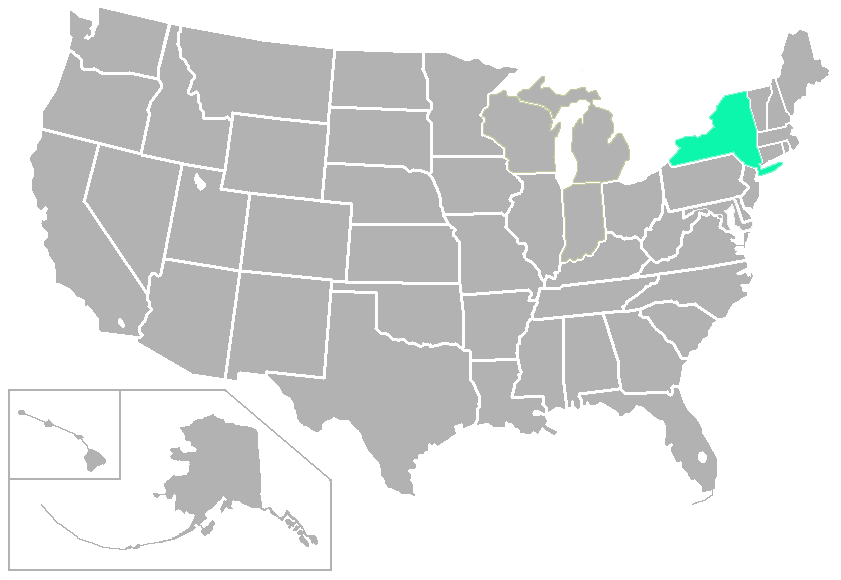

The Skyline Conference is an intercollegiate athletic conference based in the New York City area that competes in the NCAA's Division III.

The league was originally chartered on May 16, 1989, as a men's basketball conference and now sponsors 17 sports (nine for men and 8 for women). The Skyline Conference sponsors baseball, men's and women's basketball, men's and women's cross country, men's golf, men's and women's lacrosse, men's and women's soccer, softball, men's and women's swimming and diving, men's and women's tennis, and men's and women's volleyball.

Primarily comprising schools from the New York metropolitan area, the Skyline Conference currently has 11 full-time member schools, as well as two part-time members that compete in men's volleyball only.

Prior to the 2007–08 academic year, the league introduced the Skyline Presidents Cup. St. Joseph's (LI) won the first three Presidents Cups (2007–10), followed by Farmingdale State winning in 2010–11. St. Joseph's (LI) collected its fourth Presidents Cup in 2011–12, with Farmingdale State regaining the title in both 2012–13 and 2013–14.

== History ==
Skyline Conference
Locations of Skyline Conference members full

=== Recent events ===
In May 2018, Manhattanville College announced that they would leave the MAC Freedom Conference and return to the Skyline for the 2019–20 academic year. Manhattanville was a charter member of the Skyline before leaving to join the MAC in 2007.

On April 22, 2025, New Jersey City University (NJCU) announced that it would leave the Skyline as an affiliate member for men's volleyball to join the City University of New York Athletic Conference (CUNYAC) for that sport after the 2025 spring season of the 2024–25 academic year (who would later join for all sports, beginning 2027–28).

=== Chronological history ===
- 1989 – On May 16, 1989, the Skyline Conference was founded. Charter members included Manhattanville College, the College of Mount Saint Vincent, the State University of New York at Old Westbury, the State University of New York at Stony Brook and the United States Merchant Marine Academy (Merchant Marine), beginning the 1989–90 academic year.
- 1993 – Mount Saint Mary College joined the Skyline in the 1993–94 academic year.
- 1994 – Stony Brook left the Skyline to join the Division II ranks of the National Collegiate Athletic Association (NCAA) as an NCAA D-II Independent after the 1993–94 academic year.
- 1996 – The State University of New York Maritime College joined the Skyline in the 1996–97 academic year.
- 1998 – Yeshiva University joined the Skyline in the 1998–99 academic year.
- 1999 – St. Joseph's College of New York at Long Island (now St. Joseph's University of New York at Long Island) joined the Skyline in the 1999–2000 academic year.
- 2000 – Stevens Institute of Technology joined the Skyline in the 2000–01 academic year.
- 2003 – Centenary College of New Jersey (now Centenary University) and the State University of New York of Farmingdale (also known as Farmingdale State College) joined the Skyline in the 2003–04 academic year.
- 2005 – Three institutions joined the Skyline as affiliate members, all effective in the 2006 spring season (2005–06 academic year):
  - Kean University and Montclair State University for men's and women's lacrosse
  - and Stockton University for men's lacrosse
- 2007:
  - Four institutions had left the Skyline to join their respective new home primary conferences, all effective after the 2006–07 academic year:
    - Centenary (N.J.) to the Pennsylvania Athletic Conference (PAC; later the Colonial States Athletic Conference or CSAC)
    - Manhattanville and Stevens to the MAC Freedom Conference
    - and U.S. Merchant Marine to the Landmark Conference
  - Bard College, Polytechnic Institute of New York (later the Polytechnic Institute of New York University, or NYU Poly), the State University of New York at Purchase and The Sage Colleges (women's college Russell Sage College and the co-ed Sage College of Albany) joined the Skyline in the 2007–08 academic year.
  - Ramapo College joined the Skyline as an affiliate member for women's lacrosse in the 2007 spring season (2006–07 academic year).
- 2011:
  - Bard left the Skyline to join the Liberty League after the 2010–11 academic year.
  - New Jersey City University (NJCU) joined the Skyline as an affiliate member for men's volleyball (with Kean and Ramapo adding for that sport), all effective in the 2012 spring season (2011–12 academic year):
- 2013 – Kean, Montclair State and Ramapo left the Skyline as affiliate members for women's lacrosse after the 2013 spring season (2012–13 academic year).
- 2014:
  - NYU Poly left the Skyline to discontinue its athletics program as it was merged into New York University after the 2013–14 academic year.
  - Sarah Lawrence College joined the Skyline in the 2014–15 academic year.
- 2015 – St. Joseph's College of New York at Brooklyn (now St. Joseph's University of New York at Brooklyn) joined the Skyline in the 2015–16 academic year.
- 2016 – U.S. Merchant Marine rejoined the Skyline in the 2016–17 academic year.
- 2017:
  - The Sage Colleges (Russell Sage and Sage [or SCA]) left the Skyline to join the Empire 8 after the 2016–17 academic year.
  - Five institutions left the Skyline as affiliate members, all effective after the 2017 spring season (2016–17 academic year):
    - Kean for men's and women's lacrosse and men's volleyball
    - Montclair State for men's and women's lacrosse
    - New Jersey City (NJCU) for men's volleyball
    - Stockton for men's lacrosse
    - and Ramapo for women's lacrosse
- 2019:
  - Manhattanville rejoined the Skyline in the 2019–20 academic year.
  - New Jersey City (NJCU) and Ramapo rejoined the Skyline as affiliate members for men's volleyball in the 2020 spring season (2019–20 academic year).
- 2025 – New Jersey City (NJCU) left the Skyline as an affiliate member for men's volleyball to join the City University of New York Athletic Conference (CUNYAC) after the 2025 spring season (2024–25 academic year).

== Member schools ==
=== Current members ===
The Skyline currently has 12 full members, all but five are private schools:

Institution	Location	Founded	Affiliation	Enrollment	Nickname	Colors	Joined (Note: Represents the calendar year when fall sports competition begins.)
University of Mount Saint Vincent	Riverdale, New York	1847	Catholic (S.C.N.Y.)	1,918	Dolphins		1989
Farmingdale State College (Note: Also known as the State University of New York at Farmingdale.)	East Farmingdale, New York	1912	Public (Note: Part of the State University of New York System.)	8,162	Rams		2003
Manhattanville University	Purchase, New York	1841	Nonsectarian	2,700	Valiants		1989; 2019 (Note: Manhattanville had been a charter member in 1989, but left the Skyline after the 2006–07 school year to join the MAC Freedom Conference, before rejoining in 2019–20.)
Mount Saint Mary College	Newburgh, New York	1960	Catholic	2,556	Knights		1994
Purchase College (Note: Also known as the State University of New York at Purchase.)	Purchase, New York	1967	Public	4,379	Panthers		2007
Sarah Lawrence College	Yonkers, New York	1926	Nonsectarian	1,782	Gryphons		2014
St. Joseph's University (N.Y.)–Brooklyn	Brooklyn, New York	1916	Catholic (C.S.J.)	1,261	Bears		2015
St. Joseph's University (N.Y.)–Long Island	Patchogue, New York	1971	Catholic (C.S.J.)	3,893	Golden Eagles		1999
Maritime College (Note: Also known as the State University of New York Maritime College.)	Throggs Neck, New York	1874	Public	1,755	Privateers		1996
SUNY Old Westbury (Note: Also known as the State University of New York at Old Westbury.)	Old Westbury, New York	1965	Public	4,364	Panthers		1989
United States Merchant Marine Academy	Kings Point, New York	1942	Federal	910	Mariners		1989; 2016 (Note: Merchant Marine had been a charter member in 1989, but left the Skyline after the 2006–07 school year to join the Landmark Conference, before rejoining in 2016–17.)
Yeshiva University	New York, New York	1886	Orthodox Jewish	6,744	Maccabees		1998

=== Affiliate members ===
The Skyline currently has one affiliate member, a public school.

Institution	Location	Founded	Affiliation	Enrollment	Nickname	Joined (Note: Represents the calendar year when fall sports competition begins.)	Skyline sport(s)	Primary conference
Ramapo College (Note: Both New Jersey City and Ramapo had previously competed as affiliate members of the Skyline for men's volleyball from the 2012 to 2017 spring seasons (2011–12 to 2016–17 school years).) (Note: Ramapo competed in the Skyline as an affiliate member for women's lacrosse from the 2008 to 2013 spring seasons (2007–08 to 2012–13 school years).)	Mahwah, New Jersey	1969	Public	5,233	Roadrunners	2019	Men's volleyball	New Jersey (NJAC)

=== Former members ===
The Skyline had seven former full members, all but one were private schools:

Institution	Location	Founded	Affiliation	Enrollment	Nickname	Joined (Note: Represents the calendar year when fall sports competition begins.)	Left (Note: Represents the calendar year when spring sports competition ends.)	Current conference
Bard College	Annandale-on-Hudson, New York	1860	Episcopal	1.958	Raptors	2007	2011	Liberty (LL)
Centenary University	Hackettstown, New Jersey	1867	United Methodist	1,597	Cyclones	2003	2007	Atlantic East (AEC)
Polytechnic Institute of New York University	Brooklyn, New York	1854	Nonsectarian	N/A	Fighting Jays	2007	2014	N/A (Note: NYU Poly was merged into New York University in 2014.)
The Sage Colleges; Sage College of Albany (coed); Russell Sage College (women's)	Albany and Troy, New York	1916	Nonsectarian	2,389	Gators	2007	2018	Empire 8 (E8) (Note: The Sage Colleges have merged into one, and used the name Russell Sage College since 2020.)
Stevens Institute of Technology	Hoboken, New Jersey	1870	Nonsectarian	5,260	Ducks	2000	2007	MAC Freedom
Stony Brook University (Note: Also known as the State University of New York at Stony Brook.)	Stony Brook, New York	1957	Public (Note: Part of the State University of New York System.)	26,814	Patriots (Note: Stony Brook adopted its current nickname of Seawolves, beginning the 1994–95 school year; immediately following the school's departure from the Skyline Conference.)	1989	1994	Coastal (CAA) (Note: Currently an NCAA Division I athletic conference.)

=== Former affiliate members ===
The Skyline currently has five affiliate members, all were public schools.

Institution	Location	Founded	Affiliation	Enrollment	Nickname	Joined (Note: Represents the calendar year when fall sports competition begins.)	Left (Note: Represents the calendar year when spring sports competition end.)	Skyline sport(s)	Primary conference
Kean University	Union, New Jersey	1855	Public	14,404	Cougars	2006	2017	Men's lacrosse	New Jersey (NJAC)
Kean University	Union, New Jersey	1855	Public	14,404	Cougars	2005	2013	Women's lacrosse	New Jersey (NJAC)
Kean University	Union, New Jersey	1855	Public	14,404	Cougars	2011	2017	Men's volleyball	New Jersey (NJAC)
Montclair State University	Montclair, New Jersey	1908	Public	19,464	Red Hawks	2006	2017	Men's lacrosse	New Jersey (NJAC)
Montclair State University	Montclair, New Jersey	1908	Public	19,464	Red Hawks	2005	2013	Women's lacrosse	New Jersey (NJAC)
New Jersey City University (Note: Both New Jersey City and Ramapo had previously competed as affiliate members of the Skyline for men's volleyball from the 2012 to 2017 spring seasons (2011–12 to 2016–17 school years).)	Jersey City, New Jersey	1929	Public	8,443	Gothic Knights	2011	2017	Men's volleyball	New Jersey (NJAC)
New Jersey City University	Jersey City, New Jersey	1929	Public	8,443	Gothic Knights	2019	2025	Men's volleyball	New Jersey (NJAC)
Ramapo College (Note: Ramapo remains in the Skyline as an affiliate member for men's volleyball.)	Mahwah, New Jersey	1969	Public	5,233	Roadrunners	2007	2013	Women's lacrosse	New Jersey (NJAC)
Stockton University	Pomona, New Jersey	1969	Public	8,458	Ospreys	2006	2017	Men's lacrosse	New Jersey (NJAC)

=== Membership timeline ===
Full member (all sports) Full member (non-football) Associate member (football) Associate member (sport) Other conference 1

Summary

- Stony Brook left while reclassifying to Division I and the America East Conference (AmEast).
- NYU Poly became affiliated with New York University in 2008, but retained a separate athletic program until it completely merged into NYU in 2014. NYU competes in the University Athletic Association (UAA).
- The Kean and Ramapo men's volleyball programs left in 2017 for the Continental Volleyball Conference (CVC). Kean remains a men's lacrosse affiliate, and Ramapo returned men's volleyball to the Skyline in 2019.
- New Jersey City men's volleyball left in 2017 for independent status, but returned to the Skyline in 2019. NJCU will leave the Skyline in 2025 to become a men's volleyball affiliate of the City University of New York Athletic Conference (CUNYAC), which it will fully join in 2027.
- The Sage Colleges left in 2017 for the Empire 8. They merged in 2020 and kept the Russell Sage College name.

== Sports ==
A divisional format is used for baseball, basketball (M / W), softball, and volleyball (W).
Black
- St. Joseph's–Brooklyn
- St. Joseph's–Long Island
- SUNY Farmingdale
- SUNY Maritime
- SUNY Old Westbury
- U.S. Merchant Marine
Gold
- Manhattanville
- Mount Saint Mary
- Mount Saint Vincent
- Sarah Lawrence
- SUNY Purchase
- Yeshiva

The Skyline sponsors intercollegiate athletic competition in the following sports:

Conference sports
Sport	Men's	Women's
Baseball	Yes	No
Basketball	Yes	Yes
Cross country	Yes	Yes
Golf	Yes	No
Lacrosse	Yes	Yes
Soccer	Yes	Yes
Softball	No	Yes
Swimming & Diving	Yes	Yes
Tennis	Yes	Yes
Track and field	Yes	Yes
Volleyball	Yes	Yes
