= Empire 8 =

Intercollegiate athletic conference affiliated with the NCAA's Division III

- Formerly: Independent College Athletic Conference (1964–1991); Empire Athletic Association (1991–1999)
- Association: NCAA
- Founded: 1964
- Commissioner: Chuck Mitrano (since 2001)
- Sports fielded: 22; men's: 11; women's: 11
- Division: Division III
- No. of teams: 12 (11 in 2027)
- Headquarters: Rochester, New York
- Region: New York
- Website: www.empire8.com

Locations
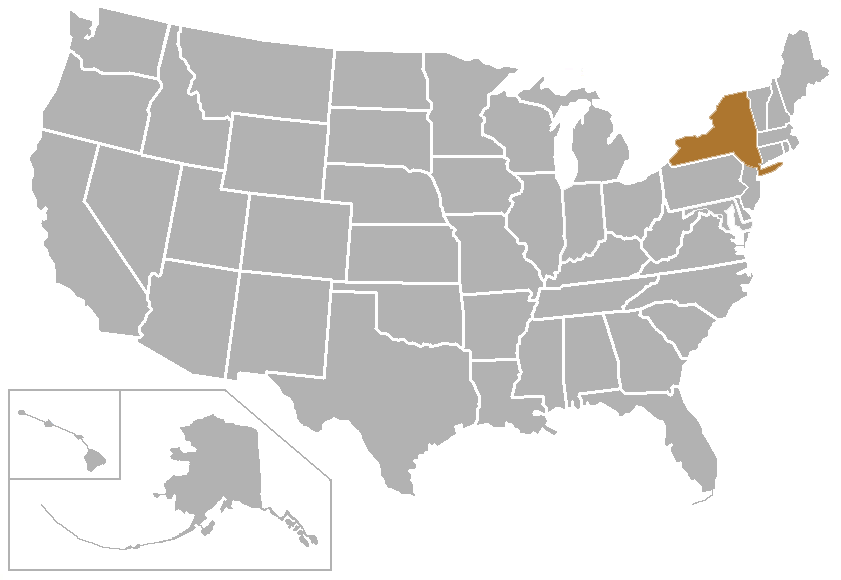

The Empire 8 (E8) is an intercollegiate athletic conference affiliated with the NCAA's Division III. The E8 sponsors intercollegiate athletic competition in men's baseball, men's and women's basketball, men's and women's cross country, women's field hockey, men's football, men's golf, men's and women's lacrosse, men's and women's soccer, women's softball, men's and women's swimming and diving, men's and women's tennis, men's and women's track and field, and women's volleyball. The E8 shared offices with the United Volleyball Conference, a separate Division III league that competed solely in men's volleyball before disbanding after the spring 2026 season.

== History ==
Empire 8 Conference
Locations of Empire 8 members
full member
affiliate member
departing

The Empire 8 can trace its beginnings back to 1964 with the founding of the Independent College Athletic Conference (ICAC). At this time, the conference was made up of Alfred University, Clarkson University, Hobart College, Rensselaer Polytechnic Institute (RPI), St. Lawrence University, and Union College. After Union left the league, Ithaca College and Rochester Institute of Technology (RIT) joined the ICAC.

In 1991, the ICAC regrouped to become the Empire Athletic Association (EAA), with Clarkson leaving and Hartwick College joining to replace the spot. Hobart/William Smith, RPI, and St. Lawrence left in 1993, to be replaced by Elmira College, Nazareth College, and Utica University. Alfred re-joined and St. John Fisher College joined the league in 1998.

The EAA became the Empire 8 Athletic Conference in 1999, hosting 13 sports.

Stevens Institute of Technology joined as a field hockey member beginning in 2006 and became a full member in 2007. RIT announced on June 5, 2009 that it planned to leave the Empire 8 for the Liberty League beginning in the fall of the 2011–12 season. Houghton College also announced that they would join the Empire 8 in the 2012–13 season as they transitioned from a school of the National Association of Intercollegiate Athletics (NAIA) to NCAA Division III status; they became full D-III members in 2016.

The most recent changes to the conference's membership were announced in the 2018–19 school year. First, Stevens announced in August 2018 that it would leave the E8 at the end of the 2018–19 school year to rejoin the Middle Atlantic Conferences after an absence of more than 40 years. Stevens joined the MAC's Freedom Conference. In January 2019, the E8 reported that Stevens would eventually be replaced by Keuka College in 2020–21, and in March, The Sage Colleges merged Russell Sage College and Sage College of Albany, effectively making the former women-only Russell Sage co-educational in fall 2020.

On July 15, 2020, the Empire 8 postponed all fall sports, but provided conference championships in those sports in spring 2021. On August 26, 2021, the E8 admitted Medaille for 2022–23, joining from the Allegheny Mountain Collegiate Conference.

In 2023, three State University of New York schools will all join the Empire 8, beginning in the 2024–25 academic year: Starting with the State University of New York at Brockport (SUNY Brockport) and the State University of New York at Geneseo (SUNY Geneseo) on August 21; followed by the State University of New York Polytechnic Institute (SUNY Poly) on November 20.

=== Chronological timeline ===
- 1964 – The Empire 8 was founded of the Independent College Athletic Conference (ICAC). Charter members included Alfred University, Clarkson College of Technology (now Clarkson University), Hobart College (later William Smith College followed suit when women's sports was added into the conference), Rensselaer Polytechnic Institute (RPI), St. Lawrence University and Union College, beginning the 1964–65 academic year.
- 1971:
  - Union (N.Y.) left the ICAC after the 1970–71 academic year.
  - Ithaca College and Rochester Institute of Technology (RIT) joined the ICAC in the 1971–72 academic year.
- 1991:
  - Alfred and Clarkson left the ICAC after the 1990–91 academic year.
  - The ICAC was regrouped to become the Empire Athletic Association (EAA), beginning the 1991–92 academic year.
  - Hartwick College joined the EAA in the 1991–92 academic year.
- 1993:
  - Hobart & William Smith, Rensselaer Poly (RPI) and St. Lawrence left the EAA after the 1992–93 academic year.
  - Elmira College, Nazareth College (now Nazareth University) and Utica College (now Utica University) joined the EAA in the 1993–94 academic year.
- 1998 – St. John Fisher College joined the EAA (with Alfred rejoining alongside) in the 1998–99 academic year.
- 1999 – The EAA was rebranded as the Empire 8 Athletic Conference (a.k.a. Empire 8 or E8), hosting 13 sponsored sports, beginning the 1999–2000 academic year.
- 2004 – Norwich University and Springfield College of Massachusetts joined the Empire 8 as affiliate members for football in the 2004 fall season (2004–05 academic year).
- 2006 – Stevens Institute of Technology (a.k.a. Stevens Tech or Stevens) and Washington & Jefferson College joined the Empire 8 as affiliate members for field hockey in the 2006 fall season (2006–07 academic year):
- 2007 – Stevens upgraded as a full member of the Empire 8 for all sports in the 2007–08 academic year.
- 2009:
  - Norwich left the Empire 8 as an affiliate member for football after the 2008 fall season (2008–09 academic year).
  - Moravian University, the University of Scranton and Susquehanna University joined the Empire 8 as affiliate members for men's golf in the 2010 spring season (2009–10 academic year).
- 2010 – Springfield left the Empire 8 as an affiliate member for football after the 2009 fall season (2009–10 academic year).
- 2011:
  - Rochester Tech (RIT) left the Empire 8 for the Liberty League after the 2010–11 academic year.
  - Frostburg State University and Salisbury University joined the Empire 8 as affiliate members for football in the 2011 fall season (2011–12 academic year).
- 2012:
  - Houghton College joined the Empire 8 in the 2012–13 academic year.
  - The State University of New York College at Buffalo (now Buffalo State University) joined the Empire 8 as an affiliate member for football in the 2012 fall season (2012–13 academic year).
- 2014 – The State University of New York at Brockport (SUNY Brockport) joined the Empire 8 as an affiliate member for football in the 2014 fall season (2014–15 academic year).
- 2015:
  - Frostburg State and Salisbury left the Empire 8 as affiliate members for football to join the New Jersey Athletic Conference (NJAC) for that sport after the 2014 fall season (2014–15 academic year).
  - The State University of New York at Cortland (SUNY Cortland) and the State University of New York at Morrisville (SUNY Morrisville) joined the Empire 8 as affiliate members for football in the 2015 fall season (2015–16 academic year).
- 2017:
  - Moravian, Scranton and Susquehanna left the Empire 8 as affiliate members for men's golf after the 2017 spring season (2016–17 academic year).
  - Ithaca left the Empire 8 to join the Liberty League after the 2016–17 academic year.
  - Russell Sage College (then a women's college) and Sage College of Albany joined the Empire 8 in the 2017–18 academic year.
  - The State University of New York at Canton (SUNY Canton) and the State University of New York at Oswego (SUNY Oswego) joined the Empire 8 as affiliate members for men's golf in the 2018 spring season (2017–18 academic year).
- 2018 – SUNY Canton left the Empire 8 as an affiliate member for men's golf after the 2018 spring season (2017–18 academic year).
- 2019:
  - Buffalo State left the Empire 8 as an affiliate member for football to join the NJAC after the 2018 fall season (2018–19 academic year).
  - Stevens left the Empire 8 to rejoin the Middle Atlantic Conferences (particularly the MAC's Freedom Conference) after the 2018–19 academic year.
- 2020:
  - Keuka College joined the Empire 8 in the 2020–21 academic year
  - The Sage Colleges merged Russell Sage and Sage College of Albany, making the former women-only Russell Sage co-educational (thus remaining in the Empire 8), in the 2020–21 academic year.
- 2022 – Medaille College joined the Empire 8 in the 2022–23 academic year.
- 2023:
  - Medaille left the Empire 8 after the 2022–23 academic year; as the university announced that it would ceased operations one year after joining the conference.
  - Washington & Jefferson left the Empire 8 as an affiliate member for field hockey to join the North Coast Athletic Conference (NCAC) for that sport after the 2022 fall season (2022–23 academic year).
- 2024:
  - The State University of New York at Geneseo (SUNY Geneseo) and the State University of New York Polytechnic Institute (SUNY Poly) [alongside SUNY Brockport to upgrade for all sports] joined the Empire 8 in the 2024–25 academic year.
  - Nine institutions joined the Empire 8 as affiliate members (and/or added other single sports into their associate memberships), all effective in the 2024–25 academic year:
    - Hilbert College for football
    - SUNY Canton rejoining for men's golf
    - and SUNY Oswego, Lesley University, Norwich University, the State University of New York at Delhi (SUNY Delhi), Thomas College, Vermont State University at Johnson and Vermont State University at Lyndon for men's tennis
- 2025:
  - Alfred State College joined the Empire 8 as an affiliate member for football in the 2025 fall season (2025–26 academic year).
  - The Empire 8 announced that it entered into a scheduling agreement for non-conference football games with the Liberty League for the 2025 and 2026 seasons. As part of this agreement, Hilbert left the Empire 8 to join the Liberty League as an affiliate member for football after the 2024 season (2024–25 school year), giving both leagues 8 football-playing members.
- 2026
  - The State University of New York at Oneonta (SUNY Oneonta) will join the Empire 8 as an affiliate member for men's tennis, beginning in the 2027 spring season (2026–27 academic year).
  - The Empire 8, which had previously sponsored men's volleyball as a non-NCAA sport with its members competing for NCAA tournament bids as part of single-sport conferences (the Continental Volleyball Conference, New England Volleyball Conference, and United Volleyball Conference), will elevate that sport to full NCAA championship status starting in spring 2027 (2026–27 school year). The E8 men's volleyball league will launch with seven full members.
- 2027 – Keuka will leave the Empire 8 to join the Allegheny Mountain Collegiate Conference after the 2026–27 academic year.

== Member schools ==
=== Current members ===
The Empire 8 currently has twelve full members; all but three are private schools.

Institution	Location	Founded	Affiliation	Enrollment	Nickname	Colors	Joined (Note: Represents the calendar year when fall sports competition begins.)	Football?
Alfred University	Alfred, New York	1836	Nonsectarian	2,189	Saxons		1964; 1998 (Note: Alfred left the Empire 8 (then known as the ICAC) after the 1990–91 school year; before rejoining in the 1998–99 school year.)	Yes
Elmira College	Elmira, New York	1855	Nonsectarian	768	Soaring Eagles		1993	No
Hartwick College	Oneonta, New York	1797	Nonsectarian	1,208	Hawks		1991	Yes
Houghton University	Houghton, New York	1883	Wesleyan	927	Highlanders		2012	No
Keuka College	Keuka Park, New York	1890	Baptist	1,535	Wolves		2020	No
Nazareth University	Pittsford, New York	1924	Nonsectarian	2,791	Golden Flyers		1993	No
Russell Sage College	Albany and Troy, New York	1916	Nonsectarian	2,389	Gators		2017	No
St. John Fisher University	Rochester, New York	1948	Catholic (Basilians)	3,610	Cardinals		1998	Yes
State University of New York at Brockport	Brockport, New York	1867	Public (Note: Part of the State University of New York System.)	7,924	Golden Eagles		2024 (Note: SUNY Brockport joined the Empire 8 as an affiliate member for football since the 2014 fall season (2014–15 school year).)	Yes
State University of New York at Geneseo	Geneseo, New York	1871	Public	4,910	Knights		2024	No
State University of New York Polytechnic Institute	Marcy, New York	1966	Public	2,850	Wildcats		2024	No
Utica University	Utica, New York	1946	Nonsectarian	4,614	Pioneers		1993	Yes

=== Affiliate members ===
The Empire 8 currently has eleven affiliate members; all but three are public schools.

Institution	Location	Founded	Affiliation	Enrollment	Nickname	Joined (Note: Represents the calendar year when fall sports competition begins.)	Empire 8 sport(s)	Primary conference
Alfred State College	Alfred, New York	1908	Public	3,500	Pioneers	2025	Football	Allegheny Mountain (AMCC)
Lesley University	Cambridge, Massachusetts	1909	Nonsectarian	6,593	Lynx	2024	Men's tennis (Note: The North Atlantic Conference (NAC) entered into a partnership with the Empire 8 by which the two leagues would operate as a single conference in men's tennis, with championships immediately conducted for that sport; thus the Empire 8 sponsoring that tournament championship, beginning the 2024–25 school year.)	North Atlantic (NAC)
Norwich University	Northfield, Vermont	1819	Private (SMC)	2,300	Cadets	2024	Men's tennis	Great Northeast (GNAC)
State University of New York at Canton	Canton, New York	1906	Public (Note: Part of the State University of New York System.)	3,122	Roos	2024	Men's golf	S.U. New York (SUNYAC)
State University of New York at Cortland	Cortland, New York	1868	Public	6,832	Red Dragons	2015	Football	S.U. New York (SUNYAC)
State University of New York at Delhi	Delhi, New York	1913	Public	3,088	Broncos	2024	Men's tennis	North Atlantic (NAC) (S.U. New York (SUNYAC) in 2026)
State University of New York at Morrisville	Morrisville, New York	1908	Public	2,486	Mustangs	2015	Football	S.U. New York (SUNYAC)
State University of New York at Oneonta (SUNY Oneonta)	Oneonta, New York	1889	Public	6,543	Red Dragons	2026	Men's tennis	S.U. New York (SUNYAC)
State University of New York at Oswego	Oswego, New York	1861	Public	7,636	Lakers	2017^{m.gf.}	Men's golf	S.U. New York (SUNYAC)
State University of New York at Oswego	Oswego, New York	1861	Public	7,636	Lakers	2024^{m.ten.}	Men's tennis	S.U. New York (SUNYAC)
Thomas College	Waterville, Maine	1894	Nonsectarian	1,949	Terriers	2024	Men's tennis	North Atlantic (NAC)
Vermont State University–Johnson (Note: The former Johnson State and Lyndon State Colleges were merged into Northern Vermont University effective July 1, 2018. Both former institutions remain separate campuses, with their own athletic programs. The schools were subsequently merged with Castleton University and Vermont Technical College to become Vermont State University on July 1, 2023.)	Johnson, Vermont	1881	Public (Note: Part of the Vermont State Colleges System.)	1,803	Badgers	2024	Men's tennis	North Atlantic (NAC)
Vermont State University–Lyndon	Lyndon, Vermont	1911	Public	1,519	Hornets	2024	Men's tennis	North Atlantic (NAC)

=== Former members ===
The Empire 8 had ten former full members, all private schools.

Institution	Location	Founded	Affiliation	Enrollment	Nickname	Joined (Note: Represents the calendar year when fall sports competition begins.)	Left (Note: Represents the calendar year when spring sports competition ends.)	Current conference
Clarkson University	Potsdam, New York	1896	Nonsectarian	3,539	Golden Knights	1964	1991	Liberty (LL)
Hobart and William Smith Colleges	Geneva, New York	1822 & (Note: The foundation date for Hobart College is 1822, and the foundation date for William Smith College is 1908.); 1908	Nonsectarian	2,118	Statesmen (Note: The men's sports teams' nickname is for Hobart College, while the women's sports teams' nickname is for William Smith College.) & Herons	1964	1993	Liberty (LL)
Ithaca College	Ithaca, New York	1892	Nonsectarian	4,600	Bombers	1971	2017	Liberty (LL)
Medaille College	Buffalo, New York	1937	Nonsectarian	3,925	Mavericks	2022	2023	Closed in 2023
Rensselaer Polytechnic Institute (RPI)	Troy, New York	1824	Nonsectarian	7,521	Engineers	1964	1993	Liberty (LL)
Rochester Institute of Technology (RIT)	Henrietta, New York	1829	Nonsectarian	17,652	Tigers	1971	2011	Liberty (LL)
The Sage Colleges; Sage College of Albany (co-ed)	Albany, New York	1949	Nonsectarian	1,600	Gators	2017	2020	N/A (Note: The Sage College of Albany was merged into Russell Sage College.)
St. Lawrence University	Canton, New York	1856	Nonsectarian	2,431	Saints	1964	1993	Liberty (LL)
Stevens Institute of Technology	Hoboken, New Jersey	1870	Nonsectarian	5,260	Ducks	2007 (Note: Stevens competed in the Empire 8 as an associate member for field hockey during the 2006 fall season (2006–07 school year).)	2019	MAC Freedom
Union College	Schenectady, New York	1795	Nonsectarian	2,194	Dutchmen & Dutchwomen	1964	1971	Liberty (LL)

=== Former affiliate members ===
The Empire 8 had ten former affiliate members; all but four were public schools.

Institution	Location	Founded	Affiliation	Enrollment	Nickname	Joined (Note: Represents the calendar year when fall sports competition begins.)	Left (Note: Represents the calendar year when spring sports competition ends.)	Empire 8 sport(s)	Primary conference
Buffalo State College (Note: Currently known as Buffalo State University since 2023.)	Buffalo, New York	1871	Public (Note: Part of the State University of New York System.)	8,339	Bengals	2012	2019	Football	S.U. New York (SUNYAC) (Note: After competing in the Empire 8 as an affiliate member, Buffalo State's football team joined the Liberty League as of the 2019 fall season (2019–20 school year).)
Frostburg State University	Frostburg, Maryland	1898	Public (Note: Part of the University System of Maryland.)	6,133	Bobcats	2011	2015	Football	Mountain East (MEC) (Note: Currently an NCAA Division II athletic conference.)
Hilbert College	Hamburg, New York	1957	Catholic (Franciscan)	800	Hawks	2024	2025	Football	Allegheny Mountain (AMCC) (Note: After competing in the Empire 8 as an affiliate member, Hilbert's football team joined the Liberty League as of the 2025 fall season (2025–26 school year).)
Moravian University	Bethlehem, Pennsylvania	1742	Moravian	2,595	Greyhounds	2009	2017	Men's golf	Landmark
Norwich University	Northfield, Vermont	1819	Private (SMC)	2,300	Cadets	2004	2009	Football	Great Northeast (GNAC) (Note: After competing in the Empire 8 as an affiliate member, Norwich's football team joined the Eastern Collegiate Football Conference (ECFC) from the 2009 to 2016 fall seasons (2009–10 to 2016–17 school years); before competing in the New England Women's and Men's Athletic Conference (NEWMAC) as of the 2017 fall season (2017–18 school year).)
Salisbury University	Salisbury, Maryland	1925	Public	8,606	Sea Gulls	2011	2015	Football	Coast to Coast (C2C) (Note: After competing in the Empire 8 as an affiliate member, Salisbury's football team joined the New Jersey Athletic Conference (NJAC) as of the 2015 fall season (2015–16 school year).)
University of Scranton	Scranton, Pennsylvania	1888	Catholic (Jesuit)	5,253	Royals	2009	2017	Men's golf	Landmark
Susquehanna University	Selinsgrove, Pennsylvania	1858	Lutheran ELCA	2,315	River Hawks	2009	2017	Men's golf	Landmark
Springfield College	Springfield, Massachusetts	1885	Private	5,062	Pride	2004	2010	Football	New England (NEWMAC)
Washington & Jefferson College	Washington, Pennsylvania	1781	Nonsectarian	1,168	Presidents	2006	2023	Field hockey	Presidents' (PAC) (Note: After competing in the Empire 8 as an affiliate member, Washington & Jefferson's field hockey team joined the North Coast Athletic Conference (NCAC) as of the 2023 fall season (2023–24 school year).)

=== Membership timeline ===
Full member (all sports) Full member (non-football) Associate member (football) Associate member (sport)

== Sports ==
The Empire 8 sponsors intercollegiate athletic competition in the following sports:

Conference sports
Sport	Men's	Women's
Baseball	✓	
Basketball	✓	✓
Cross country	✓	✓
Field hockey		✓
Flag football		✓
Football	✓	
Golf	✓	✓
Ice hockey	✓	
Lacrosse	✓	✓
Soccer	✓	✓
Softball		✓
Swimming & Diving	✓	✓
Tennis	✓	✓
Track and field (indoor)	✓	✓
Track and field (outdoor)	✓	✓
Volleyball	✓	✓
Wrestling	✓	

=== Men's sponsored sports by school ===
School	Baseball	Basketball	Cross Country	Football	Golf	Ice Hockey	Lacrosse	Soccer	Swimming & Diving	Tennis	Track & Field (Indoor)	Track & Field (Outdoor)	Volleyball	Wrestling	Total Empire 8 Sports
Alfred	Yes	Yes	Yes	Yes	No	No	Yes	Yes	Yes	Yes	Yes	Yes	No	No	10
Brockport	Yes	Yes	Yes	Yes	No	Yes	Yes	Yes	Yes	No	Yes	Yes	No	Yes	11
Elmira	Yes	Yes	No	No	No	Yes	Yes	Yes	No	No	No	No	Yes	Yes	7
Geneseo	No	Yes	Yes	No	No	Yes	Yes	Yes	Yes	No	Yes	Yes	No	No	8
Hartwick	No	Yes	Yes	Yes	No	No	Yes	Yes	Yes	No	Yes	Yes	Yes	No	9
Houghton	Yes	Yes	Yes	No	No	No	No	Yes	No	Yes	Yes	Yes	Yes	No	8
Keuka	Yes	Yes	Yes	No	Yes	No	Yes	Yes	No	No	No	No	No	No	6
Nazareth	No	Yes	Yes	No	Yes	Yes	Yes	Yes	Yes	Yes	Yes	Yes	Yes	No	11
Russell Sage	Yes	Yes	Yes	No	Yes	No	Yes	Yes	No	No	Yes	Yes	Yes	No	9
St. John Fisher	Yes	Yes	Yes	Yes	Yes	Yes	Yes	Yes	No	Yes	Yes	Yes	Yes	Yes	13
SUNY Poly	Yes	Yes	Yes	No	Yes	No	Yes	Yes	No	No	No	No	Yes	No	7
Utica	Yes	Yes	Yes	Yes	Yes	Yes	Yes	Yes	No	No	Yes	Yes	No	Yes	11
Totals	9	12	11	5+3 (Note: Affiliate members Alfred State, Cortland and SUNY Morrisville.)	6+2 (Note: Affiliate member Canton and Oswego.)	6	11	12	5	4+7 (Note: Affiliate members Delhi, Lesley, Norwich, Oswego, Thomas, VTSU Johnson and VTSU Lyndon.)	9	9	7	4	122

==== Men's varsity sports not sponsored by the Empire 8 ====
School	Alpine skiing	Equestrian (Note: Not an NCAA-sponsored sport.)	Rugby
Alfred	Independent	Independent	Independent
Nazareth	No	Independent	Independent

=== Women's sponsored sports by school ===
School	Basketball	Cross Country	Field Hockey	Flag Football (Note: Part of the NCAA Emerging Sports for Women program in all three NCAA divisions.)	Golf	Lacrosse	Soccer	Softball	Swimming & Diving	Tennis	Track & Field (Indoor)	Track & Field (Outdoor)	Volleyball	Total Empire 8 Sports
Alfred	Yes	Yes	Yes	No	No	Yes	Yes	Yes	Yes	Yes	Yes	Yes	Yes	11
Brockport	Yes	Yes	Yes	Yes	No	Yes	Yes	Yes	Yes	Yes	Yes	Yes	Yes	11
Elmira	Yes	No	Yes	Yes	No	Yes	Yes	Yes	No	No	No	No	Yes	6
Geneseo	Yes	Yes	Yes	Yes	Yes	Yes	Yes	Yes	Yes	Yes	Yes	Yes	Yes	12
Hartwick	Yes	Yes	Yes	Yes	No	Yes	Yes	Yes	Yes	Yes	Yes	Yes	Yes	11
Houghton	Yes	Yes	Yes	No	No	No	Yes	Yes	No	Yes	Yes	Yes	Yes	9
Keuka	Yes	Yes	Yes	No	Yes	Yes	Yes	Yes	No	No	No	No	Yes	8
Nazareth	Yes	Yes	Yes	No	Yes	Yes	Yes	Yes	Yes	Yes	Yes	Yes	Yes	12
Russell Sage	Yes	Yes	Yes	Yes	Yes	Yes	Yes	Yes	No	Yes	Yes	Yes	Yes	11
St. John Fisher	Yes	Yes	Yes	No	Yes	Yes	Yes	Yes	No	Yes	Yes	Yes	Yes	11
SUNY Poly	Yes	Yes	No	No	Yes	Yes	Yes	Yes	No	No	No	No	Yes	7
Utica	Yes	Yes	Yes	No	Yes	Yes	Yes	Yes	No	Yes	Yes	Yes	Yes	11
Totals	12	11	11	5	7	11	12	12	5	9	9	9	12	120

==== Women's varsity sports not sponsored by the Empire 8 ====
School	Alpine skiing	Equestrian (Note: Although recognized as part of the NCAA Emerging Sports for Women program, Division III has not added that sport to the program.)	Gymnastics (Note: De facto Division I sport; the NCAA championship meet is open to members of all divisions.)	Ice hockey	Rowing	Rugby (Note: Part of the NCAA Emerging Sports for Women program in all three NCAA divisions.)	Wrestling (Note: De facto Division I sport through the 2026–27 school year, with the NCAA championship meet open to members of all divisions. A separate Division III championship will be established in 2027–28.)
Alfred	Independent	Independent	No	No	No	Independent	No
Brockport	No	No	NCGA	No	No	No	No
Elmira	No	No	No	UCHC	No	No	AMCC
Geneseo	No	Independent	No	No	No	No	No
Hartwick	No	No	No	No	No	No	No
Nazareth	No	Independent	No	UCHC	Independent	No	No
Russell Sage	No	No	No	No	No	No	No
St. John Fisher	No	No	No	UCHC	Liberty League	No	No
Utica	No	No	NCGA	UCHC	No	No	Independent
