= Middle Atlantic Conferences =

Group of three NCAA Division III athletic conferences

- Formerly: Middle Atlantic States Collegiate Athletics Association; Middle Atlantic States Collegiate Athletic Conference
- Association: NCAA
- Founded: 1912; 114 years ago
- Commissioner: Megan Morrison
- Sports fielded: 27; men's: 14; women's: 13
- Division: Division III
- No. of teams: 18 (9, MAC Commonwealth; 9, MAC Freedom)
- Headquarters: Annville, Pennsylvania
- Region: Mid-Atlantic
- Website: gomacsports.com

Locations
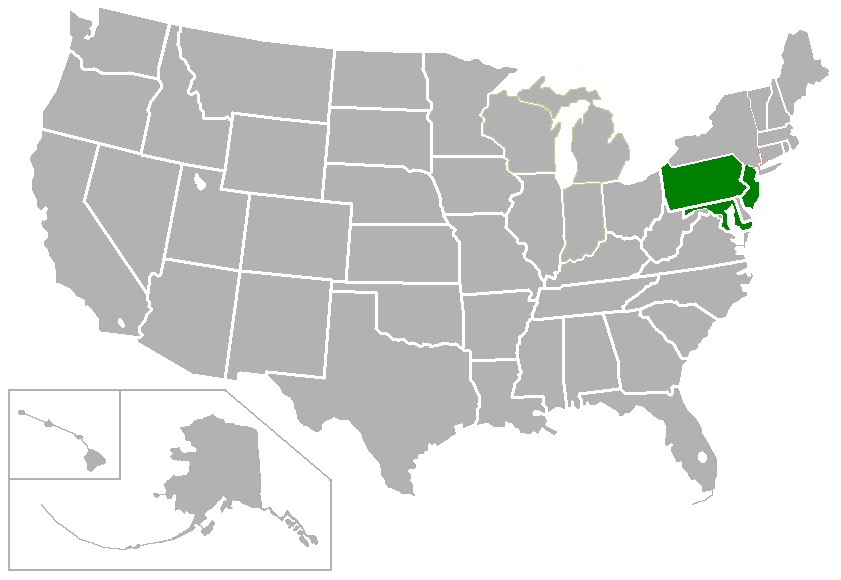

The Middle Atlantic Conferences (MAC) is an umbrella organization of three intercollegiate athletic conferences that competes in the NCAA's Division III. The 18 member colleges are in the Mid-Atlantic states of Maryland, New Jersey and Pennsylvania.

The organization is divided into two main conferences: the MAC Commonwealth and the MAC Freedom. A third conference, named the Middle Atlantic Conference (singular), draws members from both the Commonwealth and Freedom conferences and sponsors sports that only a certain set of members participate in, such as ice hockey, track & field and cross country.

== History ==
In 1912, the "Middle Atlantic States Collegiate Athletics Association" (MASCAA) was founded primarily as a track association and had its first event, a track meet, at Lafayette College in May 1913. In 1922, it was reorganized as the "Middle Atlantic States Collegiate Athletic Conference" (MASCAC or MAC). The original 13 members present at the formation meeting in 1922 were: Bucknell University, Drexel University, Franklin & Marshall College, Gettysburg College, Haverford College, Muhlenberg College, New York University, Princeton University, Rutgers University, Stevens Institute of Technology, Susquehanna University, Swarthmore College, and the University of Delaware. In addition, another five members who were not present at the initial meeting but formally approved of the plan were: Columbia University, Johns Hopkins University, Lehigh University, Ursinus College, and Widener University.

During its history, the organization has had at least 50 different members associated with it. The conference had as many as 37 members at one time in the late 1950s. A major reduction in the league occurred in 1974 after the NCAA created Divisions I, II, and III. At that time, 11 members left to form the Division I East Coast Conference and by 1976, the MAC became fully associated with Division III. An additional 11 members left in 1992 to form the Centennial Conference; the football programs for eight of those schools had already left in 1981. In 1999, the current corporation formed with its three conferences: MAC Commonwealth, MAC Freedom, and Middle Atlantic.

Arcadia University and Manhattanville College joined MAC Freedom for 2007–08. They replaced Juniata College, Drew University, Moravian College, Susquehanna University, and the University of Scranton, who left to join the new Landmark Conference. To offset the change in numbers, it was also decided to switch Lycoming College from the MAC Freedom to the MAC Commonwealth.

Alvernia University, Misericordia University, and Eastern University, all from the Pennsylvania Athletic Conference, accepted membership in the MAC Freedom and started participation in the 2008–09 school year. Starting in the 2009–10 school year, Alvernia switched from the MAC Freedom to the MAC Commonwealth, thereby giving the Commonwealth and Freedom leagues the same number of members.

Stevenson University and Hood College accepted invitations to join the MAC and MAC Commonwealth starting with the 2012–13, expanding the conference to 18 members. Elizabethtown College moved to the Landmark Conference for 2014–15. In May 2018, Manhattanville College announced that they would leave the MAC Freedom Conference and return to the Skyline Conference for the 2019–20 academic year. Manhattanville was a charter member of the Skyline before leaving to join the MAC in 2007. Three months later, the MAC announced that Stevens Institute of Technology, which had left the conference in 1978, would return in 2019–20 and replace Manhattanville in the MAC Freedom. In April 2019, the MAC announced that York College of Pennsylvania would join the MAC Commonwealth in 2020–21.

In May 2019, the MAC announced it would realign the Commonwealth and Freedom conferences into two equally-sized leagues effective with York's arrival in 2020. At that time, Arcadia and Lycoming moved from the MAC Commonwealth to the MAC Freedom, while Eastern made the opposite move.

In February 2022, the Landmark Conference announced that Wilkes University and Lycoming College accepted invitations to the conference starting in the 2023–24 season. Shortly afterwards, Misericordia announced that they would begin sponsoring men's ice hockey in 2024. The addition gave the MAC enough member teams to qualify for an automatic bid so the conference formally announced the addition of men's ice hockey as a sponsored sport. As part of a larger realignment within college hockey, both Neumann University and Wilkes joined the MAC as affiliate members in ice hockey only. Those additions then gave the conference sufficient women's hockey teams for an auto bid and the conference. Both the men's and women's ice hockey divisions officially began with the 2024–25 season.

The MAC announced in April 2025 that Atlantic East Conference member Neumann University, already a MAC member in men's ice hockey, would become a full MAC member starting in 2026–27. Neumann's future alignment within the MAC (i.e., Commonwealth or Freedom) was not determined at that time. That June, another Atlantic East member, Marywood University, was announced as the MAC's 18th member, also effective in 2026–27. The overall MAC also announced that Marywood and Neumann would respectively join MAC Freedom and MAC Commonwealth.

== MAC football ==
In 1958, the MAC began sponsoring football. The football conference essentially operated as three separate conferences with the larger schools (Bucknell, Delaware, Gettysburg, Lafayette, Lehigh, Muhlenberg, Rutgers, and Temple) playing a round-robin schedule in the "University Division," and the smaller schools being split into the "College Division - North" (Albright, Dickinson, Juniata, Lebanon Valley, Lycoming, Moravian, Susquehanna, Wagner, and Wilkes) and the "College Division - South" (Drexel, Haverford, Johns Hopkins, Pennsylvania Military, Swarthmore, Ursinus, and Western Maryland) each playing a separate round-robin schedule. Although the upper division of the conference (which later included Drexel, La Salle, and Saint Joseph's) competed at the Division I (then known as the University Division) level in other sports, only Rutgers was considered a University Division football school. Following the 1969 season, the upper level of MAC football was disbanded as Temple dropped out to upgrade their football schedule. Rutgers had previously dropped out of the MAC for all sports and a five-team football league was not desirable. The lower division continued as MAC football, but Bucknell, Delaware, Gettysburg, Lafayette, and Lehigh operated as football independents for the rest of their tenure with the league. Numerous other MAC schools competed in other football leagues throughout most of the league's history.

In 1983, the Centennial Football League was formed by eight MAC members. Eventually, those eight schools and two others broke apart from the MAC for all sports, founding the Centennial Conference in 1991. Since then, all league members that sponsor football have competed in the MAC Football Conference.

== Member schools ==
Locations of current MAC members.
MAC Commonwealth
MAC Freedom
Affiliates

=== MAC Commonwealth ===
| Institution | Location | Founded | Affiliation | Enrollment | Nickname | Joined MAC (Note: Represents the calendar year when fall sports competition begins.) (Note: Date when the school joined the overall MAC; this does not necessarily reflect when that school joined MAC Commonwealth.) | Colors |
|---|---|---|---|---|---|---|---|
| Albright College | Reading, Pennsylvania | 1856 | Methodist | 1,380 | Lions | 1945 (Note: Conference records prior to 1946 are incomplete so years given are the earliest known that were officially recorded.) | |
| Alvernia University | Reading, Pennsylvania | 1958 | Catholic | 2,796 | Golden Wolves | 2008 | |
| Eastern University | St. Davids, Pennsylvania | 1925 | Baptist | 8,727 | Eagles | 2008 | |
| Hood College | Frederick, Maryland | 1893 | Reformed | 2,101 | Blazers | 2012 | |
| Messiah University | Grantham, Pennsylvania | 1909 | Christian | 3,373 | Falcons | 1983 | |
| Neumann University | Aston, Pennsylvania | 1965 | Catholic | 2,244 | Knights | 2026 (Note: Neumann was a MAC affiliate member for ice hockey since the 2024–25 school year.) | |
| Stevenson University | Stevenson, Maryland | 1947 | Nonsectarian | 3,684 | Mustangs | 2012 | |
| Widener University | Chester, Pennsylvania | 1821 | Nonsectarian | 5,713 | Pride | 1946 | |
| York College of Pennsylvania | York, Pennsylvania | 1787 | Nonsectarian | 3,825 | Spartans | 2020 | |

=== MAC Freedom ===
| Institution | Location | Founded | Affiliation | Enrollment | Nickname | Joined MAC (Note: Represents the calendar year when fall sports competition begins.) (Note: Date when the school joined the overall MAC; this does not necessarily reflect when that school joined MAC Freedom.) | Colors |
|---|---|---|---|---|---|---|---|
| Arcadia University | Glenside, Pennsylvania | 1853 | Presbyterian | 3,404 | Knights | 2007 | |
| Delaware Valley University | Doylestown, Pennsylvania | 1896 | Nonsectarian | 2,199 | Aggies | 1965 | |
| DeSales University | Center Valley, Pennsylvania | 1965 | Catholic | 2,972 | Bulldogs | 1997 | |
| Fairleigh Dickinson University–Florham | Madison, New Jersey | 1942 | Nonsectarian | 2,885 | Devils | 1977 | |
| King's College | Wilkes-Barre, Pennsylvania | 1946 | Catholic | 1,939 | Monarchs | 1977 | |
| Lebanon Valley College | Annville, Pennsylvania | 1866 | Methodist | 2,146 | Flying Dutchmen | 1945 (Note: Conference records prior to 1946 are incomplete so years given are the earliest known that were officially recorded.) | |
| Marywood University | Scranton, Pennsylvania | 1915 | Catholic | 2,530 | Pacers | 2026 | |
| Misericordia University | Dallas, Pennsylvania | 1924 | Catholic | 2,200 | Cougars | 2008 | |
| Stevens Institute of Technology | Hoboken, New Jersey | 1870 | Nonsectarian | 8,469 | Ducks | 1946, 2019 (Note: Stevens is officially listed as having been a MAC member in 1946, the earliest year for which complete conference records exist. However, because it was represented at the original formation meeting of the all-sports MAC in 1922, it is often regarded as a founding member. Stevens left the MAC after the 1977–78 school year; before rejoining in 2019–20.) | |

=== Affiliate members ===
| Institution | Location | Nickname | Founded | Affiliation | Enrollment | MAC sport(s) | Year joined | Primary conference | Colors |
|---|---|---|---|---|---|---|---|---|---|
| Wilkes University | Wilkes-Barre, Pennsylvania | Colonels | 1933 | Nonsectarian | 5,381 | ice hockey | 2024 | Landmark | |

== Sports ==
Member teams currently compete in 27 sports, 14 men's and 13 women's. The most recently added sports are men's and women's ice hockey and men's volleyball, all added for 2017–18. The MAC now sponsors all NCAA Division III sports except women's rowing.

Conference sports
| Sport | Men's | Women's |
|---|---|---|
| Baseball | ✓ | |
| Basketball | ✓ | ✓ |
| Cross country | ✓ | ✓ |
| Field hockey | | ✓ |
| Flag Football | | ✓ |
| Football | ✓ | |
| Ice Hockey | ✓ | ✓ |
| Golf | ✓ | ✓ |
| Lacrosse | ✓ | ✓ |
| Soccer | ✓ | ✓ |
| Softball | | ✓ |
| Swimming | ✓ | ✓ |
| Tennis | ✓ | ✓ |
| Track & field (indoor) | ✓ | ✓ |
| Track & field (outdoor) | ✓ | ✓ |
| Volleyball | ✓ | ✓ |
| Wrestling | ✓ | ✓ |

=== Middle Atlantic Conference ===
The Middle Atlantic Conference combines schools from both the MAC Commonwealth and MAC Freedom and is currently used for cross country, flag football, football, women's golf, ice hockey, track & field (indoor / outdoor), swimming, men's volleyball, and wrestling. The MAC officially sponsored men's and women's ice hockey for many years, but the addition of Neumann and Wilkes as affiliate members gave the conference an automatic qualifier for the NCAA Tournament. The first MAC ice hockey tournaments took place in March 2025. Previously, the MAC used the regular-season results of UCHC games involving all MAC members to extrapolate a MAC champion (the same model used by the Ivy League, which has a similar relationship with ECAC Hockey).

==== Men's sports ====
| Team | Cross Country | Football | Ice Hockey | Swimming | Track & Field (Indoor) | Track & Field (Outdoor) | Volleyball | Wrestling | Totals |
|---|---|---|---|---|---|---|---|---|---|
| Albright | ✓ | ✓ | ✓ | ✗ | ✓ | ✓ | ✗ | ✓ | 6 |
| Alvernia | ✓ | ✓ | ✓ | ✗ | ✓ | ✓ | ✗ | ✓ | 6 |
| Arcadia | ✓ | ✗ | ✓ | ✓ | ✓ | ✓ | ✓ | ✓ | 7 |
| Delaware Valley | ✓ | ✓ | ✗ | ✗ | ✓ | ✓ | ✗ | ✓ | 5 |
| DeSales | ✓ | ✗ | ✗ | ✗ | ✓ | ✓ | ✗ | ✗ | 3 |
| Eastern | ✓ | ✓ | ✗ | ✗ | ✓ | ✓ | ✓ | ✓ | 6 |
| FDU-Florham | ✓ | ✓ | ✗ | ✓ | ✓ | ✓ | ✗ | ✗ | 5 |
| Hood | ✓ | ✗ | ✗ | ✓ | ✓ | ✓ | ✓ | ✗ | 5 |
| King's | ✓ | ✓ | ✓ | ✓ | ✓ | ✓ | ✓ | ✓ | 8 |
| Lebanon Valley | ✓ | ✓ | ✓ | ✓ | ✓ | ✓ | ✗ (Note: Lebanon Valley plans to add men's volleyball in 2027–28.) | ✗ | 6 |
| Marywood | ✓ | ✗ | ✗ | ✓ (Note: & Diving) | ✓ | ✓ | ✗ | ✗ | 4 |
| Messiah | ✓ | ✗ | ✗ | ✓ | ✓ | ✓ | ✓ | ✓ | 6 |
| Misericordia | ✓ | ✓ | ✓ | ✓ | ✓ | ✓ | ✓ | ✓ | 8 |
| Neumann | ✓ | ✗ | ✓ | ✗ | ✗ | ✓ | ✓ | ✗ | 4 |
| Stevens | ✓ | ✗ | ✗ | ✓ | ✓ | ✓ | ✓ | ✓ | 6 |
| Stevenson | ✓ | ✓ | ✓ | ✓ | ✓ | ✓ | ✓ | ✗ | 7 |
| Widener | ✓ | ✓ | ✗ | ✓ | ✓ | ✓ | ✓ | ✗ | 6 |
| York | ✓ | ✗ | ✗ | ✓ | ✓ | ✓ | ✗ | ✓ | 5 |
| Totals | 18 | 10 | 8+1 | 12 | 17 | 18 | 10 | 10 | 103+1 |
Affiliate Members
| Wilkes | | | ✓ | | | | | | 1 |

==== Women's Sports ====
| Team | Cross Country | Flag Football | Golf | Ice Hockey | Swimming | Track & Field (Indoor) | Track & Field (Outdoor) | Wrestling (Note: De facto Division I sport through 2026–27. The NCAA championship is currently open to members of all three divisions, but a separate D-III championship will be established in 2027–28.) | Totals |
|---|---|---|---|---|---|---|---|---|---|
| Albright | ✓ | ✓ | ✓ | ✗ | ✗ | ✓ | ✓ | ✓ | 6 |
| Alvernia | ✓ | ✗ | ✓ | ✓ | ✗ | ✓ | ✓ | ✓ | 6 |
| Arcadia | ✓ | ✗ | ✓ | ✓ | ✓ | ✓ | ✓ | ✓ | 7 |
| Delaware Valley | ✓ | ✗ | ✗ | ✗ | ✗ | ✓ | ✓ | ✓ | 4 |
| DeSales | ✓ | ✗ | ✗ | ✗ | ✗ | ✓ | ✓ | ✗ | 3 |
| Eastern | ✓ | ✓ | ✓ | ✗ | ✗ | ✓ | ✓ | ✓ | 6 |
| FDU-Florham | ✓ | ✗ | ✓ | ✗ | ✓ | ✓ | ✓ | ✗ | 5 |
| Hood | ✓ | ✗ | ✓ | ✓ | ✓ | ✓ | ✓ | ✗ | 6 |
| King's | ✓ | ✗ | ✓ | ✓ | ✓ | ✓ | ✓ | ✗ | 6 |
| Lebanon Valley | ✓ | ✗ (Note: Adding in 2028-29) | ✓ | ✓ | ✓ | ✓ | ✓ | ✗ | 6 |
| Marywood | ✓ | ✓ | ✓ | ✗ | ✓ (Note: & Diving) | ✓ | ✓ | ✗ | 6 |
| Messiah | ✓ | ✗ (Note: Adding in 2027-28) | ✗ | ✗ | ✓ | ✓ | ✓ | ✗ | 4 |
| Misericordia | ✓ | ✗ | ✓ | ✗ | ✓ | ✓ | ✓ | ✓ | 6 |
| Neumann | ✓ | ✓ | ✗ | ✓ | ✗ | ✗ | ✓ | ✗ | 4 |
| Stevens | ✓ | ✗ | ✗ | ✗ | ✓ | ✓ | ✓ | ✗ | 4 |
| Stevenson | ✓ | ✗ | ✓ | ✓ | ✓ | ✓ | ✓ | ✗ | 6 |
| Widener | ✓ | ✗ | ✗ | ✗ | ✓ | ✓ | ✓ | ✗ | 4 |
| York | ✓ | ✗ | ✓ | ✗ | ✓ | ✓ | ✓ | ✓ | 6 |
| Totals | 18 | 4 | 12 | 7+1 | 12 | 17 | 18 | 7 | 95+1 |
Affiliate Members
| Wilkes | | | | ✓ | | | | | 1 |
