= MAC Commonwealth Conference =

MAC Commonwealth
- Conference: NCAA
- Founded: 1999
- Sports fielded: 23; men's: 11; women's: 12
- Division: Division III
- No. of teams: 9
- Headquarters: Annville, Pennsylvania
- Region: Mid-Atlantic
- Website: http://www.gomacsports.com

The MAC Commonwealth, in full Middle Atlantic Conference Commonwealth, is an intercollegiate athletic conference affiliated with the NCAA's Division III. It is one of the three conferences that operate under the umbrella of the Middle Atlantic Conferences; the others being the MAC Freedom and the Middle Atlantic Conference, a grouping used for some sports that consists of MAC Commonwealth and MAC Freedom schools. Member institutions are located in Pennsylvania and Maryland.

== Member schools ==
The conference has had two significant membership changes in the 2020s. First, the MAC announced in April 2019 that York College of Pennsylvania would join from the Capital Athletic Conference in 2020. The following month, the MAC announced that upon York's arrival, the MAC Commonwealth and MAC Freedom would be realigned so that each would have 9 members. Eastern moved from the MAC Freedom to the MAC Commonwealth, while Arcadia and Lycoming moved in the opposite direction. Then in 2023, Lycoming and Wilkes left both the MAC Freedom and the overall MAC, leading the MAC to move Lebanon Valley from MAC Commonwealth to MAC Freedom in order to balance the membership numbers.

=== Current members ===
The MAC Commonwealth currently has nine full members, all are private schools:

Institution	Location	Founded	Affiliation	Enrollment	Nickname	Colors	Joined (Note: Represents the calendar year when fall sports competition begins.)	Football?
Albright College	Reading, Pennsylvania	1856	Methodist	2,304	Lions		1945 (Note: Member school has been part of the MAC before the formation of the MAC Commonwealth in the 1999–2000 school year.)	Yes
Alvernia University	Reading, Pennsylvania	1958	Catholic	2,872	Golden Wolves		2009 (Note: Alvernia has been in the MAC since the 2008–09 school year, but competed in the MAC Freedom during that same season.)	Yes
Eastern University	St. Davids, Pennsylvania	1952	Baptist	3,420	Eagles		2020 (Note: Eastern (Pa.) has been in the MAC since the 2008–09 school year, but competed in the MAC Freedom from 2008–09 to 2019–20.)	Yes
Hood College	Frederick, Maryland	1893	Reformed	1,174	Blazers		2012	No
Messiah University	Grantham, Pennsylvania	1909	Christian	3,305	Falcons		1983	No
Neumann University	Aston, Pennsylvania	1965	Catholic (Franciscan)	3,000	Knights		2026 (Note: Neumann has been a MAC affiliate member for ice hockey since the 2024–25 school year.)	No
Stevenson University	Stevenson, Maryland	1947	Nonsectarian	3,621	Mustangs		2012	Yes
Widener University	Chester, Pennsylvania	1821	Nonsectarian	6,402	Pride		1946	Yes
York College of Pennsylvania	York, Pennsylvania	1787	Nonsectarian	5,564	Spartans		2020	No

Notes

Enrollment source:

=== Former members ===
The MAC Commonwealth had six former full members, all were private schools:

Institution	Location	Founded	Affiliation	Enrollment	Nickname	Joined (Note: Represents the calendar year when fall sports competition begins.)	Left (Note: Represents the calendar year when spring sports competition ends.)	Current conference	Football?
Arcadia University	Glenside, Pennsylvania	1853	Presbyterian	2,473	Knights	2008 (Note: Arcadia has been in the MAC since the 2007–08 school year, but competed in the MAC Freedom during that same season before returning back in 2020–21.)	2020	MAC Freedom	No
Elizabethtown College	Elizabethtown, Pennsylvania	1899	Church of the Brethren	2,416	Blue Jays	1928 (Note: Member school has been part of the MAC before the formation of the MAC Commonwealth in the 1999–2000 school year.)	2014	Landmark	No
Juniata College	Huntingdon, Pennsylvania	1876	Church of the Brethren	1,449	Eagles	1938	2007	Landmark	Yes
Lebanon Valley College	Annville, Pennsylvania	1866	Methodist	1,712	Flying Dutchmen	1945	2023	MAC Freedom	Yes
Lycoming College	Williamsport, Pennsylvania	1812	Methodist	1,272	Warriors	2007 (Note: Lycoming was a part of the MAC since the 1952–53 school year, but competed in the MAC Freedom from 1999–2000 to 2006–07 before returning back in 2020–21.)	2020	Landmark	Yes
Moravian College	Bethlehem, Pennsylvania	1742	Moravian	1,792	Greyhounds	1945	2007	Landmark	Yes
Susquehanna University	Selinsgrove, Pennsylvania	1858	Lutheran	1,900	Crusaders	1922	2007	Landmark	Yes

=== Membership timeline ===
Full member (all sports) Full member (non-football) Associate member (football) Associate member (sport)

== Sports ==
The MAC Commonwealth sponsors intercollegiate athletic competition in men's baseball, men's and women's basketball, women's field hockey, men's golf, men's and women's soccer, women's softball, men's and women's tennis, and women's volleyball. In addition, members also compete in the Middle Atlantic Conference in men's and women's cross country, women's flag football, men's football, men's and women's ice hockey, (Note: While officially sponsoring ice hockey, the larger MAC does not conduct a conference tournament; all MAC ice hockey schools compete in the single-sport United Collegiate Hockey Conference for that league's automatic bids to the NCAA Division III men's and women's tournaments. The MAC uses regular-season results of UCHC games involving MAC members to extrapolate a conference champion. The relationship between the MAC and UCHC is similar to that in Division I between the Ivy League and ECAC Hockey.) men's and women's lacrosse, men's and women's swimming, men's and women's indoor and outdoor track and field, men's volleyball, and men's and women's wrestling.

=== Men's Sports ===
School	Baseball	Basketball	Golf	Lacrosse	Soccer	Tennis	Total MAC Commonwealth Sports
Albright	✓	✓	✓	✓	✓	✓	6
Alvernia	✓	✓	✓	✓	✓	✓	6
Eastern	✓	✓	✓	✓	✓	✓	6
Hood	✓	✓	✓	✓	✓	✗	5
Messiah	✓	✓	✗	✓	✓	✓	5
Neumann	✓	✓	✗	✓	✓	✓	5
Stevenson	✓	✓	✓	✓	✓	✓	6
Widener	✓	✓	✗	✓	✓	✗	4
York	✓	✓	✓	✓	✓	✓	6
Totals	9	9	6	9	9	7	49

=== Women's Sports ===
School	Basketball	Field Hockey	Lacrosse	Soccer	Softball	Tennis	Volleyball	Total MAC Commonwealth Sports
Albright	✓	✓	✓	✓	✓	✓	✓	7
Alvernia	✓	✓	✓	✓	✓	✓	✓	7
Eastern	✓	✓	✓	✓	✓	✓	✓	7
Hood	✓	✓	✓	✓	✓	✗	✓	6
Messiah	✓	✓	✓	✓	✓	✓	✓	7
Neumann	✓	✓	✓	✓	✓	✓	✓	7
Stevenson	✓	✓	✓	✓	✓	✓	✓	7
Widener	✓	✓	✓	✓	✓	✗	✓	6
York	✓	✓	✓	✓	✓	✓	✓	7
Totals	9	9	9	9	9	7	9	61

==== Women's varsity sports not sponsored by the MAC that are played by MAC schools ====
School	Acrobatics & Tumbling	Beach Volleyball	Bowling	Equestrian
Alvernia			AMCC	✓
Stevenson	✓	✓		
