= MAC Freedom Conference =

NCAA Division III athletic conference

MAC Freedom
- Conference: NCAA
- Founded: 1999
- Sports fielded: 23; men's: 11; women's: 12
- Division: Division III
- No. of teams: 9
- Headquarters: Annville, Pennsylvania
- Region: Mid-Atlantic
- Website: https://www.gomacsports.com

The MAC Freedom, in full Middle Atlantic Conference Freedom, is an intercollegiate athletic conference affiliated with the NCAA's Division III. It is one of the three conferences that operate under the umbrella of the Middle Atlantic Conferences; the others are the MAC Commonwealth and the Middle Atlantic Conference, a grouping used for some sports that consists of MAC Commonwealth and MAC Freedom schools. Member institutions are located in New Jersey and Pennsylvania.

== Member schools ==
The most recent changes in membership coincided with the 2023 departure of Lycoming College and Wilkes University. The MAC, which only had 16 members remaining, balanced the two leagues by moving Lebanon Valley from the MAC Commonwealth to the MAC Freedom.

=== Current members ===
The MAC Freedom currently has eight full members, all are private schools:

Institution	Location	Founded	Affiliation	Enrollment	Nickname	Colors	Joined (Note: Represents the calendar year when fall sports competition begins.)	Football?
Arcadia University	Glenside, Pennsylvania	1853	Presbyterian	2,473	Knights		2007; 2020 (Note: Arcadia moved from the MAC Freedom to the MAC Commonwealth after the 2007–08 school year, before returning back in 2020–21.)	No
Delaware Valley University	Doylestown, Pennsylvania	1917	Nonsectarian	2,375	Aggies		1965 (Note: Member school has been part of the MAC before the formation of the MAC Freedom in the 1999–2000 school year.)	Yes
DeSales University	Center Valley, Pennsylvania	1965	Catholic	3,309	Bulldogs		1997	No
Fairleigh Dickinson University–Florham	Madison, New Jersey	1942	Nonsectarian	2,546	Devils		1977	Yes
King's College	Wilkes-Barre, Pennsylvania	1946	Catholic	2,421	Monarchs		1977	Yes
Lebanon Valley College	Annville, Pennsylvania	1866	Methodist	1,712	Flying Dutchmen		2023 (Note: Lebanon Valley joined the MAC prior to the 1945–46 school year. However, they were a part of the MAC Commonwealth from 1999–2000 to 2022–23.)	Yes
Marywood University	Scranton, Pennsylvania	1915	Catholic (I.H.M.)	2,470	Pacers		2026	No
Misericordia University	Dallas, Pennsylvania	1924	Catholic	2,879	Cougars		2008	Yes
Stevens Institute of Technology	Hoboken, New Jersey	1870	Nonsectarian	5,260	Ducks		1922; 2019 (Note: Stevens left the MAC after the 1977–78 school year, before rejoining back in 2019–20.)	No

Notes

Enrollment source:

=== Former members ===
The MAC Freedom had seven former full members, all were private schools:

Institution	Location	Founded	Affiliation	Enrollment	Nickname	Joined (Note: Represents the calendar year when fall sports competition begins.)	Left (Note: Represents the calendar year when spring sports competition ends.)	Current conference	Football?
Alvernia University	Reading, Pennsylvania	1958	Catholic	2,872	Crusaders (Note: Alvernia has been known as the Golden Wolves since the 2017–18 school year.)	2008	2009	MAC Commonwealth	No
Drew University	Madison, New Jersey	1867	Methodist	2,647	Rangers	1968 (Note: Member school had been part of the MAC before the formation of the MAC Freedom in the 1999–2000 school year.)	2006	Landmark	No
Eastern University	St. Davids, Pennsylvania	1952	Baptist	3,420	Eagles	2008	2020	MAC Commonwealth	No
Lycoming College	Williamsport, Pennsylvania	1812	Methodist	1,272	Warriors	1952; 2020 (Note: Lycoming moved from the MAC Freedom to the MAC Commonwealth after the 2006–07 school year; before returning back in 2020–21.)	2008; 2023	Landmark	Yes
Manhattanville College	Purchase, New York	1841	Nonsectarian	2,700	Valiants	2007	2019	Skyline	No
University of Scranton	Scranton, Pennsylvania	1888	Catholic	5,160	Royals	1938	2007	Landmark	No
Wilkes University	Wilkes-Barre, Pennsylvania	1933	Nonsectarian	5,552	Colonels	1946	2023	Landmark	Yes

=== Membership timeline ===
Full member (all sports) Full member (non-football) Associate member (football) Associate member (sport)

== Sports ==
The MAC Freedom sponsors intercollegiate athletic competition in men's baseball, men's and women's basketball, women's field hockey, men's and women's golf, men's and women's lacrosse, men's and women's soccer, women's softball, men's and women's tennis, and women's volleyball. In addition, members also compete in the MAC's Middle Atlantic Conference in men's and women's cross country, women's flag football, men's football, men's and women's ice hockey, (Note: While officially sponsoring ice hockey, the larger MAC does not conduct a conference tournament; all MAC ice hockey schools compete in the single-sport United Collegiate Hockey Conference (UCHC) for that league's automatic bids to the NCAA Division III men's and women's tournaments. The MAC uses regular-season results of UCHC games involving MAC members to extrapolate a conference champion. The relationship between the MAC and UCHC is similar to that in Division I between the Ivy League and ECAC Hockey.) men's and women's swimming, men's and women's indoor and outdoor track and field, men's volleyball, and men's and women's wrestling.

=== Men's Sports ===
School	Baseball	Basketball	Golf	Lacrosse	Soccer	Tennis	Total MAC Freedom Sports
Arcadia	✓	✓	✓	✓	✓	✓	6
Delaware Valley	✓	✓	✓	✓	✓	✗	5
DeSales	✓	✓	✓	✓	✓	✓	6
FDU–Florham	✓	✓	✓	✓	✓	✓	6
King’s	✓	✓	✓	✓	✓	✓	6
Lebanon Valley	✓	✓	✓	✓	✓	✓	6
Marywood	✓	✓	✓	✓	✓	✓	6
Misericordia	✓	✓	✓	✓	✓	✓	6
Stevens	✓	✓	✓	✓	✓	✓	6
Totals	9	9	9	9	9	8	53

==== Men's varsity sports not sponsored by the MAC that are played by MAC schools ====
School	Equestrian	Fencing
Arcadia		2027-28
Delaware Valley	✓	
Stevens		IND

=== Women's Sports ===
School	Basketball	Field Hockey	Lacrosse	Soccer	Softball	Tennis	Volleyball	Total MAC Freedom Sports
Arcadia	✓	✓	✓	✓	✓	✓	✓	7
Delaware Valley	✓	✓	✓	✓	✓	✗	✓	6
DeSales	✓	✓	✓	✓	✓	✓	✓	7
FDU–Florham	✓	✓	✓	✓	✓	✓	✓	7
King’s	✓	✓	✓	✓	✓	✓	✓	7
Lebanon Valley	✓	✓	✓	✓	✓	✓	✓	7
Marywood	✓	✓	✓	✓	✓	✓	✓	7
Misericordia	✓	✓	✓	✓	✓	✓	✓	7
Stevens	✓	✓	✓	✓	✓	✓	✓	7
Totals	9	9	9	9	9	8	9	62

==== Women's varsity sports not sponsored by the MAC that are played by MAC schools ====
School	Equestrian	Fencing
Arcadia		2027-28
Delaware Valley	✓	
Stevens		IND
