= Landmark Conference =

NCAA Division III intercollegiate conference

- Association: NCAA
- Founded: 2005
- Commissioner: Katie Boldvich
- Sports fielded: 23; men's: 11; women's: 12
- Division: Division III
- No. of teams: 10
- Headquarters: Towson, Maryland, U.S.
- Region: Mid-Atlantic
- Website: landmarkconference.org

Locations
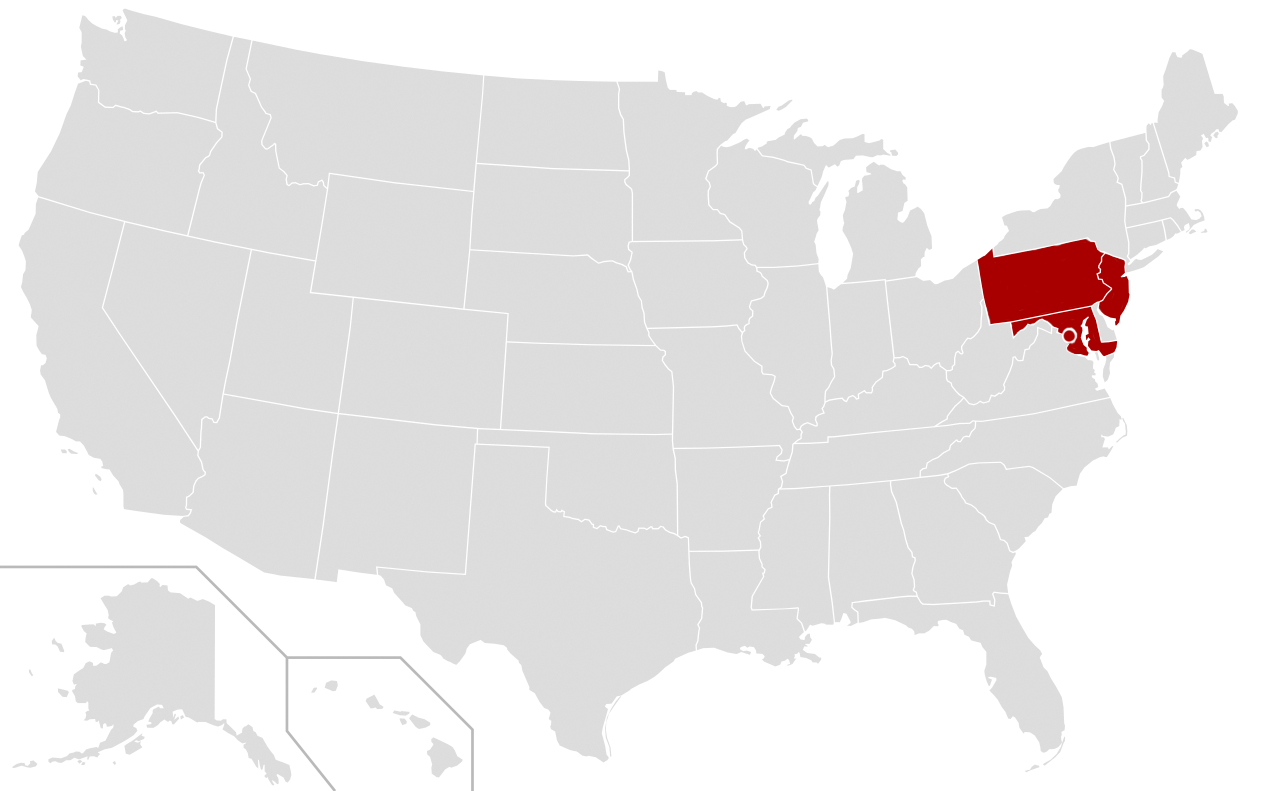

The Landmark Conference is an intercollegiate athletic conference affiliated with the NCAA's Division III. Member institutions are located in the Mid-Atlantic states of Maryland, New Jersey, and Pennsylvania, and the national capital of Washington, D.C.

== History ==
Landmark Conference
Location of LC members: full, football affiliate, m. volleyball affiliate

The conference was established on December 5, 2005. When the creation of the new conference was officially announced on December 13, Stevens Institute of Technology was originally part of that group of eight, but soon ended up leaving to join the Empire 8. In November 2006, the University of Scranton became the eighth charter member institution. John A. Reeves began his service as commissioner of the Landmark Conference earlier on September 1. He was succeeded by Daniel A. Fisher in 2012. Katie Boldvich began her tenure as the conference's third Commissioner in July 2019. The first intra-conference competition was played on September 15, 2007, at Kings Point, New York, when the University of Scranton defeated the United States Merchant Marine Academy 2–1 in men's soccer.

The Landmark Conference expanded in 2011–12 to add Marywood University in men's and women's swimming and diving, and to add Washington & Jefferson in men's lacrosse. Both Colleges have since left the conference in their original sports in the 2018–19 and 2014–15 seasons, respectively. Marywood University has since become an associate member in women's golf in the 2018–19 season.

Elizabethtown College became the newest member of the conference on July 1, 2014.

On May 22, 2015, Merchant Marine announced that it accepted an invitation to rejoin the Skyline Conference—a league in which it had been a charter member—effective the 2016–17 school year.

On February 10, 2022, the Landmark Conference announced that Wilkes University and Lycoming College accepted invitations to the conference and Landmark would begin sponsoring football starting in the 2023-24 season.

On April 1, 2022, Keystone College was announced it was joining the Landmark Conference as an associate member in football starting in the 2023-24 season.

On May 13, 2022, a crossover football scheduling agreement was announced between the Landmark Conference and Empire 8 to have members of both conferences fill vacancies within their respective schedules with non-conference opponents with each institution playing two contests (one home, one away) against opponents from the other conference.

The conference announced on May 16, 2025 that it would add men's volleyball in the 2027 season (2026–27 school year). At the time of announcement, four Landmark members sponsored the sport (Drew, Elizabethtown, Juniata, and Wilkes), all playing in the single-sport Continental Volleyball Conference. Two other members, Lycoming and Scranton, are adding the sport in the 2027 season, giving the Landmark the six members needed to be officially recognized as a Division III men's volleyball conference. On December 9, 2025, the conference announced that Kean University and Ramapo College would join the conference as men's volleyball affiliates for the 2026-27 season increasing the sponsorship to eight.

=== Chronological timeline ===
- 2005 – On December 5, 2005, the Landmark Conference was established, with its charter members being: The Catholic University of America, Drew University, Goucher College, Juniata College, Moravian College, Susquehanna University and the United States Merchant Marine Academy (Merchant Marine), beginning the 2007–08 academic year.
- 2006 – In November 2006, the University of Scranton became the eighth charter member institution, alongside the other seven charter members, also effective for the 2007–08 academic year.
- 2011 – Two institutions joined the Landmark as associate members; both effective in the 2011–12 academic year:
  - Marywood University for men's and women's swimming and diving
  - and Washington & Jefferson College for men's lacrosse
- 2013 – Elizabethtown College joined the Landmark as an associate member for softball and women's lacrosse in the 2014 spring season (2013–14 academic year).
- 2014 – Elizabethtown upgraded as a full member of the Landmark for all sports in the 2014–15 academic year.
- 2015 – Washington & Jefferson left the Landmark as an associate member for men's lacrosse after the 2015 spring season (2014–15 academic year).
- 2016 – U.S. Merchant Marine left the Landmark to rejoin the Skyline Conference after the 2015–16 academic year.
- 2017 – Marywood added women's golf to its Landmark associate membership in the 2018 spring season (2017–18 academic year).
- 2019 – Marywood left the Landmark as an associate member for men's and women's swimming and diving after the 2018–19 academic year.
- 2023:
  - Wilkes University and Lycoming College joined the Landmark in the 2023–24 academic year.
  - The Landmark began sponsoring football starting with the 2023 fall season, with Keystone College joining as an associate member for football the same year.
- 2025:
  - Keystone left the Landmark as an associate member for football after the 2024 fall season (2024–25 academic year).
  - Western Connecticut State University joined the Landmark as an associate member for football, beginning the 2025 fall season (2025–26 academic year).
- 2026
  - Marywood left the Landmark as an associate member for women's golf after the 2025–26 academic year.
  - The Landmark announced that it would start sponsoring men's volleyball in the 2027 spring season (2026–27 academic year). Kean University and Ramapo College joined the conference as men's volleyball associate members for the inaugural season.

== Member schools ==
=== Current members ===
The Landmark currently has ten full members, all are private schools:

| Institution | Location | Founded | Affiliation | Enrollment | Nickname | Joined (Note: Represents the calendar year when fall sports competition begins.) | Colors |
|---|---|---|---|---|---|---|---|
| Catholic University of America | Washington, D.C. | 1887 | Catholic (Pontifical) | 5,771 | Cardinals | 2007 | |
| Drew University | Madison, New Jersey | 1867 | United Methodist | 2,319 | Rangers | 2007 | |
| Elizabethtown College | Elizabethtown, Pennsylvania | 1899 | Church of the Brethren | 1,844 | Blue Jays | 2014 (Note: Elizabethtown competed in the Landmark as an associate member for softball and women's lacrosse during the 2014 spring season (2013–14 school year).) | |
| Goucher College | Towson, Maryland | 1885 | Nonsectarian | 2,168 | Gophers | 2007 | |
| Juniata College | Huntingdon, Pennsylvania | 1876 | Church of the Brethren | 1,409 | Eagles | 2007 | |
| Lycoming College | Williamsport, Pennsylvania | 1812 | United Methodist | 1,272 | Warriors | 2023 | |
| Moravian University | Bethlehem, Pennsylvania | 1742 | Moravian | 2,595 | Greyhounds | 2007 | |
| University of Scranton | Scranton, Pennsylvania | 1888 | Catholic (Jesuit) | 5,253 | Royals | 2007 | |
| Susquehanna University | Selinsgrove, Pennsylvania | 1858 | Lutheran ELCA | 2,315 | River Hawks | 2007 | |
| Wilkes University | Wilkes-Barre, Pennsylvania | 1933 | Nonsectarian | 5,552 | Colonels | 2023 | |

=== Associate members ===
The Landmark currently has two associate members, one private school and one public school:

| Institution | Location | Founded | Affiliation | Enrollment | Nickname | Joined (Note: Represents the calendar year when fall sports competition begins.) | Colors | Landmark sport(s) | Primary conference |
|---|---|---|---|---|---|---|---|---|---|
| Kean University | Union, New Jersey | 1855 | Public | 13,352 | Cougars | 2026 | | Men's volleyball | New Jersey (NJAC) |
| Ramapo College | Mahwah, New Jersey | 1969 | Public | 5,732 | Roadrunners | 2026 | | Men's volleyball | New Jersey (NJAC) |
| Western Connecticut State University | Danbury, Connecticut | 1903 | Public (Note: Part of the Connecticut State University System.) | 5,246 | Wolves | 2025 | | Football | Little East (LEC) |

=== Former members ===
The Landmark had one former full member, which was a federal school:

| Institution | Location | Founded | Affiliation | Enrollment | Nickname | Joined (Note: Represents the calendar year when fall sports competition begins.) | Left (Note: Represents the calendar year when spring sports competition ends.) | Colors | Current conference |
|---|---|---|---|---|---|---|---|---|---|
| United States Merchant Marine Academy (Merchant Marine) | Kings Point, New York | 1942 | Federal | 1,007 | Mariners | 2007 | 2016 | | Skyline |

=== Former associate members ===
The Landmark had three former associate members, all were private schools:

| Institution | Location | Founded | Affiliation | Enrollment | Nickname | Joined (Note: Represents the calendar year when fall sports competition begins.) | Left (Note: Represents the calendar year when spring sports competition ends.) | Colors | Landmark sport(s) | Primary conference |
|---|---|---|---|---|---|---|---|---|---|---|
| Keystone College | La Plume, Pennsylvania | 1868 | Nonsectarian | 1,600 | Giants | 2023 | 2025 | | Football | United East |
| Marywood University | Scranton, Pennsylvania | 1915 | Catholic (S.S.I.H.M.) | 2,470 | Pacers | 2011 | 2019 | | Men's swimming & diving | Middle Atlantic (MAC) |
| Marywood University | Scranton, Pennsylvania | 1915 | Catholic (S.S.I.H.M.) | 2,470 | Pacers | 2011 | 2019 | | Women's swimming & diving | Middle Atlantic (MAC) |
| Marywood University | Scranton, Pennsylvania | 1915 | Catholic (S.S.I.H.M.) | 2,470 | Pacers | 2017 | 2026 | | Women’s golf | Middle Atlantic (MAC) |
| Washington & Jefferson College | Washington, Pennsylvania | 1781 | Private | 1,265 | Presidents | 2011 | 2015 (Note: Washington & Jefferson College did not participate during the 2012–13 school year.) | | Men's lacrosse | Presidents' (PAC) |

=== Membership timeline ===
Full member (all sports) Full member (non-football) Associate member (football) Associate member (sport) Other conference 1

== Sports ==
The Landmark Conference sponsors championships in the following sports:

Conference sports
| Sport | Men's | Women's |
|---|---|---|
| Baseball | ✓ | |
| Basketball | ✓ | ✓ |
| Cross Country | ✓ | ✓ |
| Field Hockey | | ✓ |
| Football | ✓ | |
| Golf | ✓ | ✓ |
| Lacrosse | ✓ | ✓ |
| Soccer | ✓ | ✓ |
| Softball | | ✓ |
| Swimming & Diving | ✓ | ✓ |
| Tennis | ✓ | ✓ |
| Track and Field (Indoor) | ✓ | ✓ |
| Track and Field (Outdoor) | ✓ | ✓ |
| Volleyball | ✓ | ✓ |

=== Men's sponsored sports by school ===
| School | Baseball | Basketball | Cross country | Football | Golf | Lacrosse | Soccer | Swimming & Diving | Tennis | Track & Field (indoor) | Track & Field (outdoor) | Volleyball | Total Landmark Sports |
|---|---|---|---|---|---|---|---|---|---|---|---|---|---|
| Catholic | ✓ | ✓ | ✓ | ✓ | ✓ | ✓ | ✓ | ✓ | ✓ | ✓ | ✓ | ✗ | 11 |
| Drew | ✓ | ✓ | ✓ | ✗ | ✓ | ✓ | ✓ | ✓ | ✓ | ✓ | ✓ | ✓ | 11 |
| Elizabethtown | ✓ | ✓ | ✓ | ✗ | ✓ | ✓ | ✓ | ✓ (Note: Swimming only) | ✓ | ✓ | ✓ | ✓ | 11 |
| Goucher | ✗ | ✓ | ✓ | ✗ | ✓ | ✓ | ✓ | ✓ | ✓ | ✓ | ✓ | ✗ | 9 |
| Juniata | ✓ | ✓ | ✓ | ✓ | ✓ | ✓ | ✓ | ✓ | ✓ | ✓ | ✓ | ✓ | 12 |
| Lycoming | ✓ | ✓ | ✓ | ✓ | ✓ | ✓ | ✓ | ✓ | ✓ | ✗ | ✗ | ✓ | 10 |
| Moravian | ✓ | ✓ | ✓ | ✓ | ✓ | ✓ | ✓ | ✓ | ✓ | ✓ | ✓ | ✗ | 11 |
| Scranton | ✓ | ✓ | ✓ | ✗ | ✓ | ✓ | ✓ | ✓ | ✓ | ✓ | ✓ | ✓ | 11 |
| Susquehanna | ✓ | ✓ | ✓ | ✓ | ✓ | ✓ | ✓ | ✓ | ✓ | ✓ | ✓ | ✗ | 11 |
| Wilkes | ✓ | ✓ | ✓ | ✓ | ✓ | ✓ | ✓ | ✓ | ✓ | ✗ | ✗ | ✓ | 10 |
| Totals | 9 | 10 | 10 | 6+1 | 10 | 10 | 10 | 10 | 10 | 8 | 8 | 6+2 | 107+3 |
Associate Members
| Kean | | | | | | | | | | | | ✓ | 1 |
| Ramapo | | | | | | | | | | | | ✓ | 1 |
| Western Connecticut State | | | | ✓ | | | | | | | | | 1 |

==== Men's varsity sports not sponsored by the Landmark Conference that are played by Landmark schools ====
| School | Equestrian (Note: Men's equestrian competition is governed outside the NCAA.) | Fencing (Note: De facto Division I sport. The NCAA holds a single men's fencing championship meet open to all NCAA members.) | Ice Hockey | Rowing | Wrestling |
|---|---|---|---|---|---|
| Catholic | ✗ | ✗ | ✗ | MARC | ✗ |
| Drew | ✗ | IND | ✗ | ✗ | ✗ |
| Elizabethtown | ✗ | ✗ | ✗ | ✗ | IND |
| Goucher | IHSA (Note: Goucher's equestrian program is not sponsored by the NCAA but through the Intercollegiate Horse Show Association.) (Note: Goucher's equestrian program is co-ed.) | ✗ | ✗ | ✗ | ✗ |
| Juniata | ✗ | ✗ | ✗ | ✗ | ✗ (Note: Juniata will reinstate men's wrestling in 2027–28.) |
| Lycoming | ✗ | ✗ | ✗ | ✗ | IND |
| Scranton | ✗ | ✗ | ✗ | ✗ | IND |
| Wilkes | ✗ | ✗ | MAC | ✗ | IND |

=== Women's sponsored sports by school ===
| School | Basketball | Cross country | Field Hockey | Golf | Lacrosse | Soccer | Softball | Swimming & Diving | Tennis | Track & Field (Indoor) | Track & Field (Outdoor) | Volleyball | Total Landmark Sports |
|---|---|---|---|---|---|---|---|---|---|---|---|---|---|
| Catholic | ✓ | ✓ | ✓ | ✓ | ✓ | ✓ | ✓ | ✓ | ✓ | ✓ | ✓ | ✓ | 12 |
| Drew | ✓ | ✓ | ✓ | ✓ | ✓ | ✓ | ✓ | ✓ | ✓ | ✓ | ✓ | ✓ | 12 |
| Elizabethtown | ✓ | ✓ | ✓ | ✓ | ✓ | ✓ | ✓ | ✓ (Note: Swimming only) | ✓ | ✓ | ✓ | ✓ | 12 |
| Goucher | ✓ | ✓ | ✓ | ✓ | ✓ | ✓ | ✗ | ✓ | ✓ | ✓ | ✓ | ✓ | 11 |
| Juniata | ✓ | ✓ | ✓ | ✓ | ✓ | ✓ | ✓ | ✓ | ✓ | ✓ | ✓ | ✓ | 12 |
| Lycoming | ✓ | ✓ | ✓ | ✗ | ✓ | ✓ | ✓ | ✓ | ✓ | ✗ | ✗ | ✓ | 9 |
| Moravian | ✓ | ✓ | ✓ | ✓ | ✓ | ✓ | ✓ | ✓ | ✓ | ✓ | ✓ | ✓ | 12 |
| Scranton | ✓ | ✓ | ✓ | ✓ | ✓ | ✓ | ✓ | ✓ | ✓ | ✓ | ✓ | ✓ | 12 |
| Susquehanna | ✓ | ✓ | ✓ | ✓ | ✓ | ✓ | ✓ | ✓ | ✓ | ✓ | ✓ | ✓ | 12 |
| Wilkes | ✓ | ✓ | ✓ | ✓ | ✓ | ✓ | ✓ | ✓ | ✓ | ✗ | ✗ | ✓ | 10 |
| Totals | 10 | 10 | 10 | 9 | 10 | 10 | 9 | 10 | 10 | 8 | 8 | 10 | 114 |

==== Women's varsity sports not sponsored by the Landmark Conference that are played by Landmark schools ====
| School | Equestrian (Note: Although equestrian is part of the NCAA Emerging Sports for Women program, Division III competition is not included in the Emerging Sports program.) | Fencing (Note: De facto Division I sport; the NCAA women's fencing championship is open to all NCAA members.) | Flag Football | Ice Hockey | Rowing | Wrestling (Note: De facto Division I sport through 2026–27; the NCAA championship meet is currently open to all NCAA members. A separate Division III championship will be established in 2027–28.) |
|---|---|---|---|---|---|---|
| Catholic | ✗ | ✗ | ✗ | ✗ | MARC | ✗ |
| Drew | ✗ | IND | ✗ | ✗ | ✗ | ✗ |
| Elizabethtown | ✗ | ✗ | 2027-28 | ✗ | ✗ | ✗ |
| Goucher | IHSA (Note: The Drew and Goucher equestrian programs are not sponsored by the NCAA but through the Intercollegiate Horse Show Association.) (Note: Goucher's equestrian program is co-ed.) | ✗ | ✗ | ✗ | ✗ | ✗ |
| Juniata | ✗ | ✗ | ✗ | ✗ | ✗ | ✗ (Note: Juniata will add women's wrestling in 2027–28.) |
| Wilkes | ✗ | ✗ | ✗ | MAC | ✗ | IND |

== Conference champions ==
=== Fall 2025 ===
| Sport | Men's | Women's |
|---|---|---|
| Cross Country | Moravian | Moravian |
| Field Hockey | —N/a | Scranton |
| Football | Susquehanna | —N/a |
| Soccer | Catholic | Scranton |
| Volleyball | —N/a | Juniata |

=== Winter 2025–26 ===
| Sport | Men's | Women's |
|---|---|---|
| Basketball | Susquehanna | Scranton |
| Swimming & Diving | Catholic | Scranton |
| Track & Field (Indoor) | Susquehanna | Scranton |

=== Spring 2026 ===
| Sport | Men's | Women's |
|---|---|---|
| Baseball | Scranton | —N/a |
| Golf | Drew | Catholic |
| Lacrosse | Scranton | Scranton |
| Tennis | Moravian | Moravian |
| Softball | —N/a | Moravian |
| Track & Field (Outdoor) | Moravian | Scranton |

== Logo ==
During January 2007, a contest was announced to design a logo for the newly formed Landmark Conference. The contest was only open to undergraduate students from the conference schools. In a first phase, a panel of judges selected a winner at each of the eight Landmark schools. Winners received $250 each. In a second and final round, on February 6, in Washington, D.C., the presidents of the Landmark schools selected the final design from among the eight first round winners. The logo submitted by Susquehanna University's graphic design major, Manor member, and men's lacrosse player Tim Storck ’08, of Cockeysville, Maryland, was selected. Storck was awarded the $1,000 additional prize. Selected colors were maroon (Pantone 1815) and blue (Pantone 281).
