= 2018 NCAA Division III baseball tournament =

- Season: 2018
- Teams: 58
- Finals site: Neuroscience Group Field at Fox Cities Stadium; Grand Chute, Wisconsin
- Champions: Texas-Tyler (1st title)
- Runner-up: Texas Lutheran
- MOP: Simon Sedillo (Texas-Tyler)

The 2018 NCAA Division III baseball tournament was played at the end of the 2018 NCAA Division III baseball season to determine the 43rd national champion of college baseball at the NCAA Division III level. The tournament concluded with eight teams competing at Neuroscience Group Field at Fox Cities Stadium in Grand Chute, Wisconsin for the championship. Eight regional tournaments were held to determine the participants in the World Series. Regional tournaments were contested in double-elimination format, with three regions consisting of six teams, and five consisting of eight, for a total of 58 teams participating in the tournament, up from 56 in 2017. The tournament champion was Texas-Tyler, who defeated Texas Lutheran in the championship series in two games.

This was the final DIII World Series contested with the current regional format and World Series location.

== Bids ==
=== Automatic bids ===
Source: NCAA

School	Conference	Last NCAA Appearance
La Roche	AMCC	2017 (Mideast Regional)
UT Dallas	ASC	2007 (West Regional)
Salisbury	CAC	2017 (South Regional)
Swarthmore	Centennial	1985 (Mid-Atlantic Regional)
North Central (Illinois)	CCIW	2017 College World Series
Keystone	CSAC	2017 (Mideast Regional)
Western New England	CCC	2013 (New England Regional)
Ithaca	Empire 8	2017 (New York Regional)
Suffolk	Great Northeast	2017 (New England Regional)
Franklin	HCAC	2011 (Mideast Regional)
Dubuque	IIAC	First appearance
Catholic	Landmark	2015 (Mid-Atlantic Regional)
Union (New York)	Liberty	2016 (New York Regional)
UMass Boston	Little East	2017 College World Series
Westfield State	MASCAC	2010 (New England Regional)
Adrian	MIAA	2017 (Midwest Regional)
Arcadia	MAC Commonwealth	2017 (New England Regional)
Misercordia	MAC Freedom	2017 (Mideast Regional)
Monmouth (Illinois)	MWC	2002 (Central Regional)
Bethel (Minnesota)	MIAC	First appearance
Mitchell	NECC	2016 (New England Regional)
Amherst	NESCAC	2015 (New York Regional)
Babson	NEWMAC	2017 (New England Regional)
Rowan	NJAC	2017 (South Regional)
Castleton	NAC	2017 (New York Regional)
Wabash	NCAC	2011 (South Regional)
Penn State–Berks	NEAC	2017 (New England Regional)
Aurora	NACC	2012 (Midwest Regional)
Willamette	NWC	First appearance
Baldwin Wallace	OAC	2015 (New York Regional)
Shenandoah	ODAC	2017 (Mid-Atlantic Regional)
Thomas More	PAC	2016 (South Regional)
St. Joseph's-Long Island	Skyline	2016 (Mideast Regional)
Webster	SLIAC	2017 (Central Regional)
Rhodes	SAA	2017 (West Regional)
Chapman	SCIAC	2011 College World Series Runner-up
Texas Lutheran	SCAC	2013 (West Regional)
SUNY Oswego	SUNYAC	2017 World Series
LaGrange	USA South	2017 (South Regional)
Bethany Lutheran	UMAC	First appearance

=== Pool B ===
School	Conference
Wisconsin–Oshkosh	Wisconsin Intercollegiate Athletic Conference
Wisconsin–Whitewater	Wisconsin Intercollegiate Athletic Conference

=== Pool C ===
School	Conference
Alvernia	Middle Atlantic Conferences
Christopher Newport	Capital Athletic Conference
Concordia (Chicago)	Northern Athletics Collegiate Conference
Concordia (TX)	American Southwest Conference
Denison	North Coast Athletic Conference
Marietta	Ohio Athletic Conference
Otterbein	Ohio Athletic Conference
Ramapo	New Jersey Athletic Conference
Randolph–Macon	Old Dominion Athletic Conference
Redlands	Southern California Intercollegiate Athletic Conference
Southern Maine	Little East Conference
SUNY Cortland	State University of New York Athletic Conference
UT Tyler	American Southwest Conference
The College of New Jersey	New Jersey Athletic Conference
Virginia Wesleyan	Old Dominion Athletic Conference
Wooster	North Coast Athletic Conference

== Regionals ==
Bold indicates winner.

=== New England Regional ===
Whitehouse Field-Harwich, MA (Host: Massachusetts Maritime Academy)

First round/elimination round 1	Second round/elimination round 2	Semifinals/elimination semifinals	Finals
4	Western New England	15
5	**Ramapo**	**19**
Ramapo	1
**UMass Boston**	**2**^{10}
1	**UMass Boston**	**15**
8	Penn State-Berks	1
UMass Boston	4
**Oswego State**	**11**
3	**Keystone**	**3**
6	Mitchell	2^{11}
Keystone	0
**Oswego State**	**2**
2	**Oswego State**	**13**
7	Suffolk	3	**Oswego State**	**10**	--
UMass Boston	4	--
Lower round 1	Lower round 2	Lower round 3	Lower final
**Keystone**	**6**
**Western New England**	**4**	Western New England	4	**UMass Boston**	**7**
Penn State Berks	1	Keystone	4	Ramapo	5
**Ramapo**	**7**
**Ramapo**	**6**
**Mitchell**	**9**	Mitchell	0
Suffolk	3

=== Central Regional ===
GCS Ballpark-Sauget, IL (Host: St. Louis Intercollegiate Athletic Conference)

First round/elimination round 1	Second round/elimination round 2	Semifinals/elimination semifinals	Finals
4	**Rhodes**	**4**
5	Franklin	2
**Rhodes**	**7**
Webster	6^{11}
1	**Webster**	**6**
8	Thomas More	4
**Rhodes**	**6**
Wisconsin–Whitewater	3
3	**Texas-Tyler**	**8**
6	Aurora	5
Texas-Tyler	2
**Wisconsin–Whitewater**	**8**
2	**Wisconsin–Whitewater**	**12**
7	Monmouth (IL)	1	Rhodes	0	4
**Texas-Tyler**	**2**	**5**
Lower round 1	Lower round 2	Lower round 3	Lower final
**Texas-Tyler**	**10**
**Franklin**	**8**	Franklin	1	Wisconsin–Whitewater	1
Thomas More	6	**Texas-Tyler**	**5**	**Texas-Tyler**	**4**
Webster	1
**Webster**	**6**
Aurora	10	Monmouth (IL)	2
**Monmouth (IL)**	**11**

=== South Regional ===
Ting Park-Holly Springs, NC (Host: William Peace University)

First round
1	**Randolph–Macon**	**2**
6	LaGrange	1
2	**TCNJ**	**5**
5	Alvernia	2
3	Denison	1
4	**Christopher Newport**	**5**

Second round/elimination round 1
**Randolph–Macon**	**6**
Denison	1
TCNJ	5
**Christopher Newport**	**6**^{10}
**LaGrange**	**2**
Alvernia	1

Semifinals/elimination semifinals
**Randolph–Macon**	**4**
Christopher Newport	3
TCNJ	5
**LaGrange**	**9**

Elimination finals
**Christopher Newport**	**4**
LaGrange	3

Finals
**Randolph–Macon**	**11**	--
Christopher Newport	2	--

=== Mid-Atlantic Regional ===
WellSpan Park – York, PA (Host: Middle Atlantic Conferences)

First round/elimination round 1	Second round/elimination round 2	Semifinals/elimination semifinals	Finals
4	Virginia Wesleyan	1
5	**Misericordia**	**4**
**Misericordia**	**6**
Rowan	5^{10}
1	**Rowan**	**9**
8	Castleton	0
Misericordia	5
**Babson**	**7**
3	Arcadia	3
6	**Union**	**10**
Union	4
**Babson**	**5**^{10}
2	**Babson**	**12**
7	Catholic	11	Babson	7	1
**Misericordia**	**12**	**11**
Lower round 1	Lower round 2	Lower round 3	Lower final
Union	4
**Virginia Wesleyan**	**4**	**Virginia Wesleyan**	**10**	**Misericordia**	**14**
Castleton	3	**Virginia Wesleyan**	**9**	Virginia Wesleyan	4
Rowan	6
**Rowan**	**4**
**Arcadia**	**13**	Arcadia	1^{12}
Catholic	2

=== Midwest Regional ===
Frank Wade Municipal Stadium-Duluth, MN (Host: The College of Saint Scholastica)

First round
1	**Concordia–Chicago**	**13**
6	Bethany Lutheran	12
2	**North Central (IL)**	**8**
5	Dubuque	7
3	**Wisconsin–Oshkosh**	**4**
4	Bethel (MN)	3^{12}

Second round/elimination round 1
**Concordia–Chicago**	**10**
Bethel (MN)	7
North Central (IL)	1
**Wisconsin-Oshkosh**	**11**
Bethany Lutheran	3
**Dubuque**	**8**

Semifinals/elimination semifinals
Concordia–Chicago	7
**Wisconsin–Oshkosh**	**9**
North Central (IL)	4
**Dubuque**	**8**

Elimination finals
**Concordia–Chicago**	**6**
Dubuque	3

Finals
Wisconsin–Oshkosh	1	2
**Concordia–Chicago**	**7**	**3**

=== New York Regional ===
Leo Pinckney Field at Falcon Park-Auburn, NY (Host: State University of New York College at Cortland)

First round/elimination round 1	Second round/elimination round 2	Semifinals/elimination semifinals	Finals
4	Baldwin Wallace	6
5	**Swarthmore**	**11**
**Swarthmore**	**3**
SUNY Cortland	2
1	**SUNY Cortland**	**5**
8	Westfield State	4^{10}
**Swarthmore**	**9**
Southern Maine	6
3	**Southern Maine**	**3**
6	Amherst	2
**Southern Maine**	**1**
Salisbury	0
2	**Salisbury**	**3**
7	St. Joseph's–Long Island	2^{10}	**Swarthmore**	**9**	--
Southern Maine	3	--
Lower round 1	Lower round 2	Lower round 3	Lower final
Salisbury	3
**Baldwin Wallace**	**3**	**Baldwin Wallace**	**14**	**Southern Maine**	**12**
Westfield State	2	Baldwin Wallace	9	SUNY Cortland	10
**SUNY Cortland**	**10**^{11}
**SUNY Cortland**	**9**
Amherst	1	St. Joseph's–Long Island	7
**St. Joseph's–Long Island**	**2**

=== Mideast Regional ===
Nicolay Field-Adrian, MI (Host: Adrian College)

First round/elimination round 1	Second round/elimination round 2	Semifinals/elimination semifinals	Finals
4	Marietta	2
5	**Shenandoah**	**3**
Shenandoah	5
**Wooster**	**13**
1	**Wooster**	**4**
8	Wabash	2
**Wooster**	**17**
Adrian	4
3	**La Roche**	**5**
6	Ithaca	1
La Roche	0
**Adrian**	**1**
2	Otterbein	5
7	**Adrian**	**11**	**Wooster**	**4**	--
Wabash	2	--
Lower round 1	Lower round 2	Lower round 3	Lower final
La Roche	5
Marietta	2	**Wabash**	**8**	Adrian	0
**Wabash**	**4**	**Wabash**	**3**	**Wabash**	**4**
Ithaca	1
Shenandoah	5
**Ithaca**	**5**	**Ithaca**	**7**
Otterbein	4^{12}

=== West Regional ===
Avista Stadium-Spokane, WA (Host: Whitworth College/Spokane Sports Commission)

First round
1	Chapman	5
6	**Willamette**	**10**
2	Redlands	1
5	**Texas–Dallas**	**3**^{10}
3	Concordia (TX)	8
4	**Texas Lutheran**	**9**

Second round/elimination round 1
**Willamette**	**13**
Concordia (TX)	4
Texas–Dallas	1
**Texas Lutheran**	**2**
**Chapman**	**6**
Redlands	5

Semifinals/elimination semifinals
Willamette	1
**Texas Lutheran**	**6**
**Texas–Dallas**	**6**
Chapman	2

Elimination finals
**Willamette**	**10**
Texas–Dallas	3

Finals
**Texas Lutheran**	**6**	--
Willamette	5^{10}	--

== World Series ==
Neuroscience Group Field at Fox Cities Stadium-Grand Chute, WI (Host: University of Wisconsin-Oshkosh/Lawrence University/Fox Cities Convention and Visitors Bureau)

First round/elimination round 1
NE2(4)	Oswego State	5
C3(5)	Texas-Tyler	10
S1(1)	Randolph-Macon	2
MA5(8)	Misericordia	4
Oswego State	4
Randolph-Macon	11
MW1(3)	Concordia-Chicago	9
NY5(6)	Swarthmore	4
ME1(2)	Wooster	0
W4(7)	Texas Lutheran	7
Swarthmore	10
Wooster	5

Second round/Elimination finals
Texas-Tyler	7
Misericordia	3
Misericordia	6
Randolph-Macon	14
Concordia-Chicago	8
Texas Lutheran	3
Texas Lutheran	3
Swarthmore	2^{13}

Semifinals
Texas-Tyler	1	8
Randolph-Macon	6	6
Concordia-Chicago	7	4
Texas Lutheran	9	5

Championship Series
Texas-Tyler	8	9	--
Texas Lutheran	1	6	--
