= 2015 NCAA Division III baseball tournament =

- Season: 2015
- Teams: 56
- Finals site: Neuroscience Group Field at Fox Cities Stadium; Grand Chute, Wisconsin
- Champions: SUNY Cortland (1st title)
- Runner-up: Wisconsin–La Crosse
- MOP: Conrad Ziemendorf (Cortland)

The 2015 NCAA Division III baseball tournament was played at the end of the 2015 NCAA Division III baseball season to determine the 40th national champion of college baseball at the NCAA Division III level. The tournament concluded with eight teams competing at Neuroscience Group Field at Fox Cities Stadium in Grand Chute, Wisconsin for the championship. Eight regional tournaments were held to determine the participants in the World Series. Regional tournaments were contested in double-elimination format, with four regions consisting of six teams, and four consisting of eight, for a total of 56 teams participating in the tournament. The tournament champion was SUNY Cortland, who defeated Wisconsin–La Crosse in the championship series in two games.

== Bids ==
The 56 competing teams were:

=== By conference ===
Conference	Total	Schools
Northwest Conference	3	Linfield, Pacific Lutheran, Whitworth
Ohio Athletic Conference	3	Baldwin Wallace, Heidelberg, Marietta
Southern Athletic Association	3	Birmingham–Southern, Millsaps, Rhodes
Wisconsin Intercollegiate Athletic Conference	3	Wisconsin–La Crosse, Wisconsin–Stevens Point, Wisconsin–Whitewater
Capital Athletic Conference	2	Frostburg State, Salisbury
Iowa Intercollegiate Athletic Conference	2	Coe, Wartburg
New England Small College Athletic Conference	2	Amherst, Wesleyan (CT)
New Jersey Athletic Conference	2	Kean, Ramapo
St. Louis Intercollegiate Athletic Conference	2	Greenville, Webster
State University of New York Athletic Conference	2	SUNY Cortland, Oswego State
University Athletic Association	2	Emory, Washington-St. Louis
Allegheny Mountain Collegiate Conference	1	La Roche
American Southwest Conference	1	Texas–Tyler
Centennial Conference	1	Johns Hopkins
College Conference of Illinois and Wisconsin	1	Carthage
Colonial States Athletic Conference	1	Keystone
Commonwealth Coast Conference	1	Curry
Great Northeast Athletic Conference	1	Suffolk
Heartland Collegiate Athletic Conference	1	Anderson (IN)
Landmark Conference	1	Catholic
Liberty League	1	Rensselaer
Little East Conference	1	Southern Maine
Massachusetts State Collegiate Athletic Conference	1	Salem State
Michigan Intercollegiate Athletic Association	1	Adrian
MAC Commonwealth Conference	1	Alvernia
MAC Freedom Conference	1	Misericordia
Midwest Conference	1	Ripon
Minnesota Intercollegiate Athletic Conference	1	Saint John's (MN)
New England Collegiate Conference	1	Mitchell
New England Women's and Men's Athletic Conference	1	MIT
North Atlantic Conference	1	Castleton State
North Coast Athletic Conference	1	Oberlin
North Eastern Athletic Conference	1	Penn State–Berks
Northern Athletics Collegiate Conference	1	Concordia-Chicago
Old Dominion Athletic Conference	1	Shenandoah
Presidents' Athletic Conference	1	Washington & Jefferson
Skyline Conference	1	Old Westbury
Southern California Intercollegiate Athletic Conference	1	La Verne
Southern Collegiate Athletic Conference	1	Trinity (TX)
Upper Midwest Athletic Conference	1	St. Scholastica
USA South Athletic Conference	1	Methodist
Empire 8	0	none
Independents	0	none

== Regionals ==
Bold indicates winner.

=== Mideast Regional ===
Ross Memorial Park-Washington, PA (Host: Washington & Jefferson College)

First round
1	**Frostburg State**	**7**
6	Washington & Jefferson	1
2	**Shenandoah**	**5**
5	Adrian	1
3	**Heidelberg**	**6**
4	La Roche	5^{10}

Second round/elimination round 1
Frostburg State	3
**La Roche**	**4**
**Washington & Jefferson**	**9**
Adrian	3
Shenandoah	0
**Heidelberg**	**5**
**Frostburg State**	**7**
Shenandoah	2

Third round/elimination round 2
**La Roche**	**4**
Washington & Jefferson	1
**Frostburg State**	**9**
Heidelberg	6

Elimination final
**La Roche**	**6**
Heidelberg	5

Final
La Roche	4
**Frostburg State**	**8**

=== New England Regional ===
Whitehouse Field-Harwich, MA (Host: Eastern College Athletic Conference)

First round/elimination round 1	Second round/elimination round 2	Semifinals/elimination semifinals	Finals
4	**Salem State**	**6**
5	MIT	2
**Salem State**	**10**
Southern Maine	1
1	**Southern Maine**	**4**
8	Suffolk	0
Salem State	3
**Ramapo**	**6**
3	**Ramapo**	**4**
6	Castleton State	3^{11}
**Ramapo**	**12**
Curry	4
2	**Curry**	**4**
7	Wesleyan (CT)	0	**Ramapo**	**6**	--
MIT	5^{13}	--
Lower round 1	Lower round 2	Lower round 3	Lower final
**MIT**	**3**
**MIT**	**4**	Curry	0	**MIT**	**2**
Suffolk	0	**MIT**	**4**	Salem State	1^{12}
Wesleyan (CT)	1
**Wesleyan (CT)**	**4**
Castleton State	4	Southern Maine	1
**Wesleyan (CT)**	**7**

=== New York Regional ===
Leo Pinckney Field at Falcon Park-Auburn, NY (Host: State University of New York at Cortland)

First round/elimination round 1	Second round/elimination round 2	Semifinals/elimination semifinals	Finals
4	**Amherst**	**7**
5	Oswego State	5^{11}
Amherst	5
**SUNY Cortland**	**7**
1	**SUNY Cortland**	**6**
8	Oberlin	4
**SUNY Cortland**	**7**
Rensselaer	5
3	**Rensselaer**	**2**
6	Keystone	0
**Rensselaer**	**12**
Old Westbury	2
2	**Old Westbury**	**7**
7	Baldwin Wallace	5	**SUNY Cortland**	**7**	--
Rensselaer	0	--
Lower round 1	Lower round 2	Lower round 3	Lower final
**Oberlin**	**9**
Oswego State	2	Old Westbury	3	Oberlin	4
**Oberlin**	**7**	**Oberlin**	**5**	**Rensselaer**	**5**
Keystone	4
**Keystone**	**7**
**Keystone**	**4**	Amherst	2
Baldwin Wallace	2

=== Central Regional ===
Riverfront Stadium-Waverly, IA (Host: Wartburg College)

First round
1	**Wisconsin-Stevens Point**	**7**
6	Greenville	4
2	**Webster**	**4**
5	Carthage	3
3	**Anderson (IN)**	**4**
4	Wartburg	3

Second round/elimination round 1
Wisconsin-Stevens Point	2
**Wartburg**	**4**
Greenville	2
**Carthage**	**10**
**Webster**	**4**
Anderson (IN)	3
**Wisconsin-Stevens Point**	**7**
Anderson (IN)	4

Third round/elimination round 2
Wartburg	1
**Carthage**	**4**
**Webster**	**4**
Wisconsin-Stevens Point	2

Final
Carthage	1	—
**Webster**	**5**	—

=== West Regional ===
Irwin Field-Tyler, TX (Host: University of Texas at Tyler)

First round
1	**La Verne**	**2**
6	Texas-Tyler	0
2	**Trinity (TX)**	**5**
5	Linfield	1
3	**Millsaps**	**7**
4	Whitworth	6

Second round/elimination round 1
**La Verne**	**10**
Whitworth	3
**Trinity (TX)**	**5**
Millsaps	3
Texas-Tyler	6
**Linfield**	**9**

Semifinals/elimination round 2
La Verne	4
**Trinity (TX)**	**7**
**Linfield**	**6**
Millsaps	2

Elimination final
**Linfield**	**7**
La Verne	0

Final
**Trinity (TX)**	**7**	--
Linfield	3	--

=== South Regional ===
Loudermilk Stadium-Demorest, GA (Host: Piedmont College)

First round
1	**Rhodes**	**7**
6	Methodist	4
2	**Pacific Lutheran**	**9**
5	Emory	6
3	**Birmingham-Southern**	**3**
4	Marietta	1

Second round/elimination round 1
Rhodes	3
**Marietta**	**4**
Methodist	1
**Emory**	**8**
**Pacific Lutheran**	**7**
Birmingham-Southern	2
Rhodes	2
**Birmingham-Southern**	**3**

Third round/elimination round 2
**Emory**	**3**
Marietta	2^{12}
Pacific Lutheran	1
**Birmingham-Southern**	**7**

Elimination final
**Emory**	**7**
Pacific Lutheran	6

Final
**Emory**	**8**
Birmingham-Southern	5

=== Midwest Regional ===
Copeland Park-La Crosse, WI (Host: University of Wisconsin-La Crosse)

First round/elimination round 1	Second round/elimination round 2	Semifinals/elimination semifinals	Finals
4	**Coe**	**4**
5	St. John's (MN)	2
**Coe**	**5**
Ripon	4
1	**Ripon**	**15**
8	Wisconsin-Whitewater	7
**Coe**	**11**
Wisconsin-La Crosse	5
3	**Washington-St. Louis**	**2**
6	Concordia-Chicago	0
Washington-St. Louis	6
**Wisconsin-La Crosse**	**8**^{13}
2	**Wisconsin-La Crosse**	**10**
7	St. Scholastica	3	Coe	4	4
**Wisconsin-La Crosse**	**5**	**15**
Lower round 1	Lower round 2	Lower round 3	Lower final
**Wisconsin-Whitewater**	**3**
St. John's (MN)	0	Washington-St. Louis	0	Concordia-Chicago	3
**Wisconsin-Whitewater**	**2**	Wisconsin-Whitewater	7	**Wisconsin-La Crosse**	**10**
**Concordia-Chicago**	**8**
**Concordia-Chicago**	**6**
**Concordia-Chicago**	**7**	Ripon	5
St. Scholastica	4

=== Mid-Atlantic Regional ===
Santander Stadium-York, PA (Host: York Revolution/Middle Atlantic Conferences)

First round/elimination round 1	Second round/elimination round 2	Semifinals/elimination semifinals	Finals
4	**Salisbury**	**11**
5	Mitchell	1
**Salisbury**	**16**
Penn State-Berks	5
1	**Penn State-Berks**	**5**
8	Kean	4
**Salisbury**	**13**
Alvernia	3
3	**Misericordia**	**6**
6	Johns Hopkins	4
Misericordia	3
**Alvernia**	**6**
2	**Alvernia**	**3**
7	Catholic	2	**Salisbury**	**12**	--
Alvernia	2	--
Lower round 1	Lower round 2	Lower round 3	Lower final
Kean	2
Mitchell	3	**Misericordia**	**6**	Johns Hopkins	1
**Kean**	**11**	Misericordia	5	**Alvernia**	**8**
**Johns Hopkins**	**7**
**Johns Hopkins**	**10**
**Johns Hopkins**	**15**	Penn State-Berks	1
Catholic	3

== World Series ==
Neuroscience Group Field at Fox Cities Stadium-Grand Chute, WI (Host: University of Wisconsin-Oshkosh/Lawrence University/Fox Cities Convention and Visitors Bureau)

First round/elimination round 1
ME1	Frostburg State	3
NE3	Ramapo	1
NY1	Cortland	12
C2	Webster	4
Ramapo	14
Webster	2
W2	Trinity (TX)	7
S5	Emory	9
MW2	Wisconsin–La Crosse	7
MA4	Salisbury	3
Trinity (TX)	9
Salisbury	1

Second round/elimination finals
Frostburg State	1
Cortland	4
Ramapo	2
Frostburg State	5
Emory	2
Wisconsin–La Crosse	3^{12}
Trinity (TX)	10
Emory	1

Semifinals
Cortland	17	—
Frostburg State	4	—
Wisconsin–La Crosse	6	10
Trinity (TX)	16	7

Championship Series
Cortland	11	6	—
Wisconsin–La Crosse	3	2	—
