= 2017 NCAA Division III baseball tournament =

- Season: 2017
- Teams: 56
- Finals site: Neuroscience Group Field at Fox Cities Stadium; Grand Chute, Wisconsin
- Champions: Cal Lutheran (1st title)
- Runner-up: Washington & Jefferson
- MOP: Miguel Salud (Cal Lutheran)

The 2017 NCAA Division III baseball tournament was played at the end of the 2017 NCAA Division III baseball season to determine the 42nd national champion of college baseball at the NCAA Division III level. The tournament concluded with eight teams competing at Neuroscience Group Field at Fox Cities Stadium in Grand Chute, Wisconsin for the championship. Eight regional tournaments were held to determine the participants in the World Series. Regional tournaments were contested in double-elimination format, with four regions consisting of six teams, and four consisting of eight, for a total of 56 teams participating in the tournament. The tournament champion was Cal Lutheran, who defeated Washington & Jefferson in the championship series in three games.

On Sunday, May 21, the Cal Lutheran Kingsmen advanced to the Division III College World Series for the first time since 1999, with a 9–7 victory over Concordia University Texas. The team historically finished third in 1999 and were the runner-up in 1992 and 1996. The team started strong in the World Series, beating Wheaton College 4–2 and taking 14–5 and 10–8 decisions over North Central College. This meant Cal Lutheran was in the best of three championship series against Washington & Jefferson. The team was led by head coach Marty Slimak for the 24th year. Slimak had played in the DIII College World Series five times before and had helped his team to the national championship game twice.

On May 30, Cal Lutheran won its first baseball championship after defeating the Washington & Jefferson College Presidents 7–3 in the decisive third game at the Neuroscience Group Field at Fox Cities Stadium in Appleton, Wisconsin. CLU had to win twice on Tuesday, May 30, in order to win the championship title. Kingsmen player Miguel Salud of the Philippines was named the SCIAC Most Outstanding Player. He was also an NCAA Division III West All-Region Third-Team pick and a SCIAC second-team pick.

It was Salud's first and only season of collegiate baseball at CLU. As a closer, Salud led Division III in saves with fourteen. He delivered six saves in ten playoff games during postseason play. Salud played a key role in the team winning their first World Series. He appeared in 33 games, second-most for Division III players that season, and went on to earn fourteen saves with a 3–2 record. Cal Lutheran finished with a 40–11 record for the season. Another Kingsmen player, Brad Fullerton, finished with a tournament-best 11 hits to help CLU win the Division III College World Series.

The Kingsmen earned the second Division III national title in the university's history, joining the 2015 women's volleyball team. The 40–11 season was the best in team history and included a 5th straight SCIAC regular season title.

== Bids ==
The 56 competing teams were:

=== By conference ===
Conference	Total	Schools
American Southwest Conference	2	Concordia (TX), Texas–Tyler
Empire 8	2	Ithaca, St. John Fisher
Little East Conference	2	UMass–Boston, Southern Maine
MAC Commonwealth Conference	2	Alvernia, Arcadia
Minnesota Intercollegiate Athletic Conference	2	Macalester, St. Thomas (MN)
New England Women's and Men's Athletic Conference	2	Babson, Wheaton (MA)
New Jersey Athletic Conference	2	Rowan, TCNJ
North Coast Athletic Conference	2	DePauw, Wooster
Old Dominion Athletic Conference	2	Roanoke, Shenandoah
St. Louis Intercollegiate Athletic Conference	2	Greenville, Webster
Southern Athletic Association	2	Birmingham–Southern, Rhodes
State University of New York Athletic Conference	2	Oswego, Cortland
University Athletic Association	2	Emory, Washington (MO)
Wisconsin Intercollegiate Athletic Conference	2	Wisconsin–La Crosse, Wisconsin–Whitewater
Allegheny Mountain Collegiate Conference	1	La Roche
Capital Athletic Conference	1	Salisbury
Centennial Conference	1	Johns Hopkins
College Conference of Illinois and Wisconsin	1	North Central (IL)
Colonial States Athletic Conference	1	Keystone
Commonwealth Coast Conference	1	Salve Regina
Great Northeast Athletic Conference	1	Suffolk
Heartland Collegiate Athletic Conference	1	Earlham
Iowa Intercollegiate Athletic Conference	1	Wartburg
Landmark Conference	1	Elizabethtown
Liberty League	1	RIT
Massachusetts State Collegiate Athletic Conference	1	Worcester State
Michigan Intercollegiate Athletic Association	1	Adrian
MAC Freedom Conference	1	Misericordia
Midwest Conference	1	St. Norbert
New England Collegiate Conference	1	Lesley
New England Small College Athletic Conference	1	Tufts
North Atlantic Conference	1	Castleton
North Eastern Athletic Conference	1	Penn State–Berks
Northern Athletics Collegiate Conference	1	Concordia (IL)
Northwest Conference	1	Linfield
Ohio Athletic Conference	1	Otterbein
Presidents' Athletic Conference	1	Washington & Jefferson
Skyline Conference	1	SUNY Maritime
Southern California Intercollegiate Athletic Conference	1	Cal Lutheran
Southern Collegiate Athletic Conference	1	Centenary
Upper Midwest Athletic Conference	1	St. Scholastica
USA South Athletic Conference	1	LaGrange
Independents	0	none

== Regionals ==
Bold indicates winner.

=== Midwest Regional ===
Prucha Field at James B. Miller Stadium-Whitewater, WI (Host: University of Wisconsin-Whitewater)

First round/elimination round 1	Second round/elimination round 2	Semifinals/elimination semifinals	Finals
4	**Wisconsin–Whitewater**	**4**
5	St. Norbert	2
Wisconsin–Whitewater	2
**Wisconsin–La Crosse**	**5**
1	St. Scholastica	2
8	**Wisconsin–La Crosse**	**11**
Wisconsin–La Crosse	0
**Concordia (IL)**	**14**
3	**Adrian**	**5**
6	St. Thomas (MN)	2
Adrian	2
**Concordia (IL)**	**7**
2	**Concordia (IL)**	**8**
7	Macalester	3	**Concordia (IL)**	**17**	—
Wisconsin–La Crosse	3	—
Lower round 1	Lower round 2	Lower round 3	Lower final
Adrian	8
St. Norbert	0	**St. Scholastica**	**11**	**Wisconsin–La Crosse**	**8**
**St. Scholastica**	**2**	St. Scholastica	5	St. Thomas (MN)	3
**St. Thomas (MN)**	**10**
Wisconsin–Whitewater	2
**St. Thomas (MN)**	**3**	**St. Thomas (MN)**	**7**
Macalester	2^{11}

=== Mideast Regional ===
Ross Memorial Park-Washington, PA (Host: Washington & Jefferson College)

First round/elimination round 1	Second round/elimination round 2	Semifinals/elimination semifinals	Finals
1	Wooster	2
8	**Earlham**	**6**
Earlham	6
**Washington & Jefferson**	**15**
4	**Washington & Jefferson**	**12**
5	Misericordia	7
**Washington & Jefferson**	**8**
Keystone	4
3	La Roche	2
6	**Keystone**	**5**
**Keystone**	**10**
DePauw	3
2	Cortland	5
7	**DePauw**	**8**	**Washington & Jefferson**	6	**6**
Cortland	**7**	3
Lower round 1	Lower round 2	Lower round 3	Lower final
**DePauw**	**13**
**Wooster**	**12**	Wooster	4	Keystone	4
Misericordia	0	DePauw	0	**Cortland**	**22**
**Cortland**	**9**
Earlham	0
La Roche	2	**Cortland**	5
**Cortland**	**10**

=== New York Regional ===
Onondaga Baseball Complex-Syracuse, NY (Host: State University of New York Athletic Conference)

First round
1	**Oswego**	**11**
6	Ithaca	10
2	**TCNJ**	**4**
5	Tufts	3
3	**Southern Maine**	**5**
4	Castleton	3

Second round/elimination round 1
**Oswego**	**1**
Tufts	0
TCNJ	1
**Southern Maine**	**10**
**Ithaca**	**5**
Castleton	2

Semifinals/elimination semifinals
**Oswego**	**6**
Southern Maine	4
TCNJ	4
**Ithaca**	**9**

Elimination finals
**Southern Maine**	**4**
Ithaca	0

Finals
**Oswego**	6	**9**
Southern Maine	**7**	4

=== South Regional ===
American Legion Field-Danville, VA (Host: Averett University)

First round
1	Salisbury	5
6	**Roanoke**	**15**
2	**Rowan**	**10**
5	Emory	2
3	**LaGrange**	**7**
4	Otterbein	1

Second round/elimination round 1
**Roanoke**	**4**
Emory	2
Rowan	5
**LaGrange**	**12**
**Salisbury**	**6**
Otterbein	4

Semifinals/elimination semifinals
**Roanoke**	**5**
LaGrange	2
Rowan	7
**Salisbury**	**8**^{11}

Elimination finals
LaGrange	2
**Salisbury**	**4**

Finals
**Roanoke**	6	**13**
Salisbury	**7**	5

=== New England Regional ===
Whitehouse Field-Harwich, MA (Host: Massachusetts Maritime Academy)

First round/elimination round 1	Second round/elimination round 2	Semifinals/elimination semifinals	Finals
4	**UMass–Boston**	**9**
5	Penn State–Berks	8^{10}
**UMass–Boston**	**4**
Babson	0
1	Salve Regina	3
8	**Babson**	**14**
**UMass–Boston**	**13**
Suffolk	4
3	St. John Fisher	0
6	**Suffolk**	**4**
**Suffolk**	**1**
Arcadia	0^{11}
2	**Arcadia**	**4**
7	Worcester State	3^{12}	**UMass–Boston**	**11**	—
Babson	8	—
Lower round 1	Lower round 2	Lower round 3	Lower final
Arcadia	0
Penn State–Berks	4	**Salve Regina**	**5**	Suffolk	1
**Salve Regina**	**12**	Salve Regina	4	**Babson**	**9**
**Babson**	**5**
**Babson**	**12**
**St. John Fisher**	**14**	St. John Fisher	8
Worcester State	7

=== Central Regional ===
GCS Ballpark-Sauget, IL (Host: Webster College)

First round
1	**Birmingham–Southern**	**14**
6	Greenville	6
2	**Wartburg**	**3**
5	Webster	0
3	Washington (MO)	1
4	**North Central (IL)**	**3**

Second round/elimination round 1
**Birmingham–Southern**	**6**
Webster	4
Wartburg	3
**North Central (IL)**	**8**
Greenville	1
**Washington (MO)**	**7**

Semifinals/elimination semifinals
Birmingham–Southern	0
**North Central (IL)**	**5**
**Wartburg**	**1**
Washington (MO)	0^{12}

Elimination finals
**Birmingham–Southern**	**6**
Wartburg	1

Finals
**North Central (IL)**	**3**	—
Birmingham–Southern	2^{11}	—

=== West Regional ===
Irwin Field-Tyler, TX (Host: University of Texas at Tyler)

First round
1	Texas–Tyler	2
6	**Rhodes**	**7**
2	**Centenary**	**12**
5	Linfield	1
3	**Cal Lutheran**	**6**
4	Concordia (TX)	3

Second round/elimination round 1
**Rhodes**	**11**
Linfield	7
Centenary	2
**Cal Lutheran**	**8**
Texas–Tyler	2
**Concordia (TX)**	**5**

Semifinals/elimination semifinals
Rhodes	8
**Cal Lutheran**	**10**
Centenary	4
**Concordia (TX)**	**13**

Elimination finals
Rhodes	4
**Concordia (TX)**	**6**

Finals
**Cal Lutheran**	**9**	—
Concordia (TX)	7	—

=== Mid-Atlantic Regional ===
WellSpan Park – York, PA (Host: Middle Atlantic Conferences)

First round/elimination round 1	Second round/elimination round 2	Semifinals/elimination semifinals	Finals
4	**Johns Hopkins**	**15**
5	Lesley	2
**Johns Hopkins**	**13**
Alvernia	9
1	RIT	4
8	**Alvernia**	**8**
Johns Hopkins	1
**Wheaton (MA)**	**6**
3	**Wheaton (MA)**	**8**
6	Elizabethtown	6
**Wheaton (MA)**	**6**
Shenandoah	0
2	**Shenandoah**	**5**
7	SUNY Maritime	3	**Wheaton (MA)**	4	**1**
Shenandoah	**5**	0
Lower round 1	Lower round 2	Lower round 3	Lower final
**Shenandoah**	**4**
**Lesley**	**6**	Lesley	1	Johns Hopkins	2
RIT	5^{15}	**Shenandoah**	**8**	**Shenandoah**	**4**
Alvernia	6
**Alvernia**	**11**
**Elizabethtown**	**13**	Elizabethtown	1
SUNY Maritime	5

== World Series ==
Neuroscience Group Field at Fox Cities Stadium-Grand Chute, WI (Host: University of Wisconsin-Oshkosh/Lawrence University/Fox Cities Convention and Visitors Bureau)

First round/elimination round 1
MW2	Concordia (IL)	2
ME4	Washington & Jefferson	4
NY1	Oswego	7
S6	Roanoke	8
Concordia (IL)	9
Oswego	4
NE4	UMass–Boston	2
C4	North Central (IL)	5
W3	Cal Lutheran	4
MA3	Wheaton (MA)	2
UMass–Boston	3
Wheaton (MA)	2

Second round/elimination finals
Washington & Jefferson	11
Roanoke	1
Roanoke	10
Concordia (IL)	3
North Central (IL)	5
Cal Lutheran	14
North Central (IL)	5
UMass–Boston	4

Semifinals
Washington & Jefferson	8	—
Roanoke	1	—
Cal Lutheran	10	—
North Central (IL)	8	—

Championship Series
Washington & Jefferson	12	4	3
Cal Lutheran	2	12	7
