= Catholic University Cardinals =

- University: The Catholic University of America
- Nickname: Cardinals
- NCAA: Division III
- Conference: Landmark Conference, and Mid-Atlantic Rowing Conference
- Athletic director: Kevin Robinson Jr.
- Location: Washington, D.C., U.S.
- Varsity teams: 26
- Football stadium: Cardinal Stadium
- Basketball arena: Raymond A. DuFour Center
- Ice hockey arena: Fort Dupont Ice Arena
- Baseball stadium: Robert J. Talbot Field
- Softball stadium: CUA Softball Field
- Soccer stadium: Carlini Field
- Lacrosse stadium: Carlini Field
- Tennis venue: Dowd Family Tennis Courts
- Colors: Cardinal red and black
- Mascot: Red the Cardinal
- Fight song: C.U. Marching Song
- Website: catholicathletics.com

Catholic University of America's intercollegiate sports teams are called the Cardinals after the northern cardinal, and they compete in the National Collegiate Athletic Association (NCAA) Division III. They are members of the Landmark Conference, and the Mid-Atlantic Rowing Conference (rowing). The team colors are red (PMS 1805) and black. Catholic celebrates Homecoming in the fall to coincide with a home football game.

Originally known as the Red and Black after the colors they wore, Catholic University's athletes came to be known as the Cardinals (often the Flying Cardinals, occasionally the Fighting Cardinals) in the mid-1920s.

== History ==
From the founding of the NCAA in 1906 through 1955, institutions were not separated into competitive divisions, and CUA won a national championship in boxing (1938). The football team appeared in two major bowl games, the 1936 Orange Bowl, which they won, and the 1940 Sun Bowl, which they tied. David Bernstein won the national collegiate boxing championship at 115 pounds in 1938 and "Bingo" Stant, Jr. won the 1939 national championship at 165 pounds.

From 1956 through 1972, teams were classified into University Division (major college) and College Division (small college). The Cardinals competed in the latter. During that period, the men's basketball team participated in the 1964 post season tournament, and Keats Baugher won two national championships in men's swimming in 1965 (the 200 and 400-yard individual medley).

NCAA re-organized into three divisions in 1973, and CUA opted for the Division II level during the 1973–76 seasons. CUA stayed as member of the Mason-Dixon Conference. Mark Robinson won two individual national championships in track & field (the 800 meters in 1974 and 1975).

In 1976, CUA moved to Division I, competing for five years (1976–81). As independent first, and as a member of the Colonial Athletic Association later (1979–1981). During that period, the baseball team played the 1977 NCAA Division I baseball tournament.

President Edmund Pellegrino decided to drop the athletic programs to Division III and Catholic finally moved in the academic year of 1981–82, joining the Old Dominion Athletic Conference. In 1989 Catholic became a charter member of the Capital Athletic Conference, leaving the conference in 2007 to join, again as a charter member, the Landmark Conference. During this period at Division III, the men's basketball team won the national championship in 2001, Carolyn Hughes captured the 800 meters national track & field championship in 1982, and Tom Caffrey the 1,500 meters in 1991.

Women's teams were established after women were admitted as undergraduate students in the 1950s, and a Women's Sports Department was established in 1959. The Department originally offered dance lessons and ping-pong and badminton tournaments. Jone Rastapkevicius was hired as the first coordinator of women’s sports in 1961. She went on to become a coach and married fellow CUA coach Martin Dowd. In the early part of her 50-year tenure, she worked to schedule games with other local colleges, thereby turning many of the intramural sports into “extramural” ones. The Metropolitan Sports Association for Women (MISAW) was founded in the mid-1960s by CUA along with Trinity College, Georgetown, American University, and George Washington University. It operated until the early 1970s.

== Varsity teams ==
Men's sports	Women's sports
Basketball	Basketball
Soccer	Soccer
Lacrosse	Lacrosse
Cross Country	Cross Country
Tennis	Tennis
Swimming & Diving	Swimming & Diving
Indoor Track & Field	Indoor Track & Field
Rowing	Rowing
Golf	Golf
Outdoor Track & Field	Outdoor Track & Field
Baseball	Softball
Football	Field Hockey
Rugby union	Volleyball

=== Baseball ===
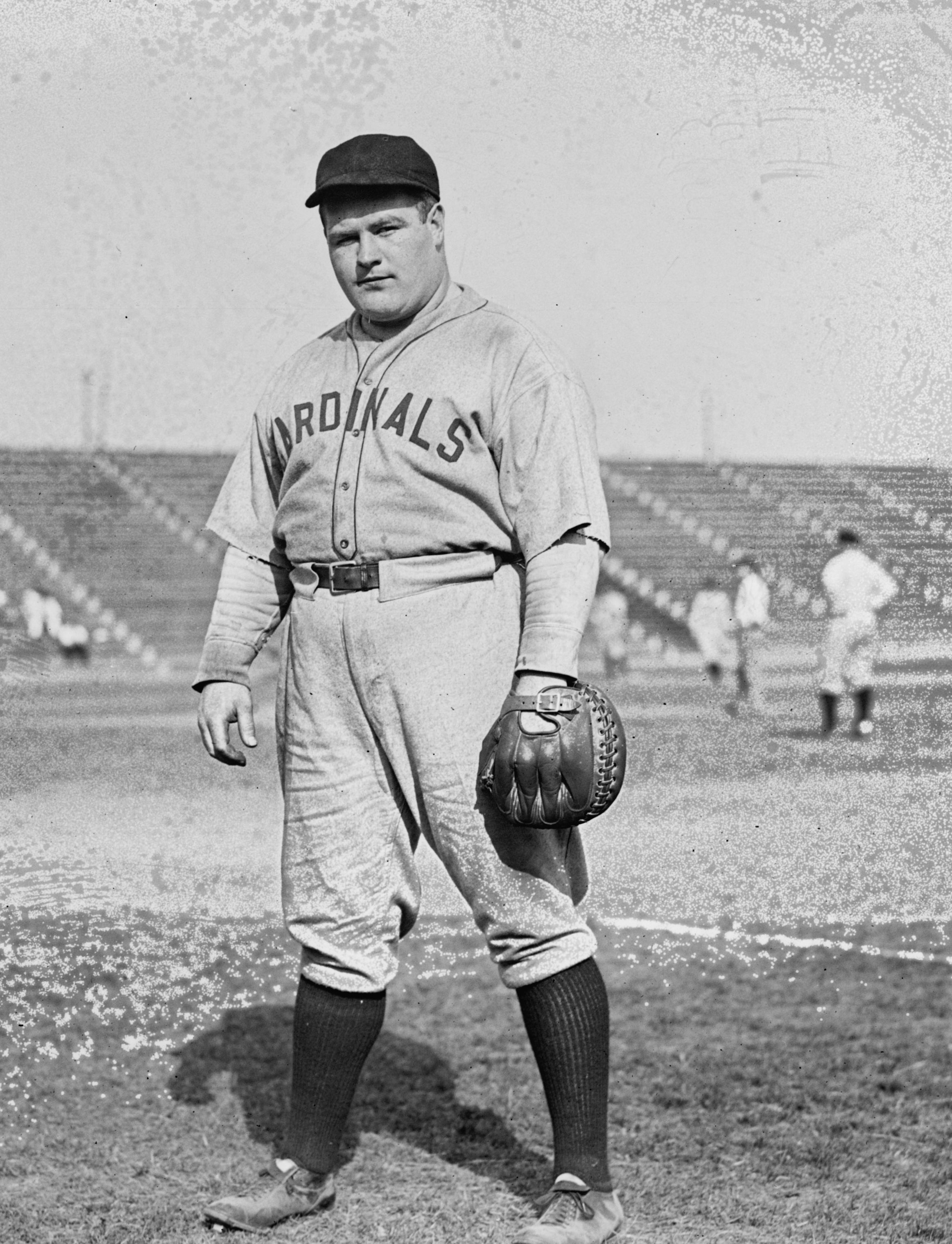
"Big" Joe Tierney, Catholic University's right fielder in 1928

The Catholic University Cardinals played the 1977 NCAA Division I baseball tournament after winning the ECAC District II championship. The Cardinals have won the Landmark Conference Tournament in 2008, 2009, 2011, 2015, 2018, and 2025.

Cardinals' NCAA D–I Tournament history
Year	Round	Opponent	Won/Lost	Result
1977
1977	Northeast Regional	Seton Hall University	W	4–3
1977	Northeast Regional	Temple University	L	3–10
1977	Northeast Regional	St. John's University	L	3–8

Cardinals' NCAA D–III Tournament history
Year	Round	Opponent	Won/Lost	Result
2011
2011	Mid-Atlantic Regional	Kean University	W	3–2
2011	Mid-Atlantic Regional	Misericordia University	L	0–4
2011	Mid-Atlantic Regional	Johns Hopkins University	L	2–7
2015
2015	Mid-Atlantic Regional	Alvernia University	L	2–3
2015	Mid-Atlantic Regional	Johns Hopkins University	L	3–15
2018
2018	Mid-Atlantic Regional	Babson College	L	11–12
2018	Mid-Atlantic Regional	Arcadia University	L	2–13
2022
2022	Ithaca Super Regional	Stevens Institute of Technology	W	7–1
2022	Ithaca Super Regional	Shenandoah University	W	6–5
2022	Ithaca Super Regional	Ithaca College	W	16–2
2022	World Series	Marietta College	L	0–7
2022	World Series	University of Wisconsin–Stevens Point	L	8–12

=== Basketball ===
==== Men's ====
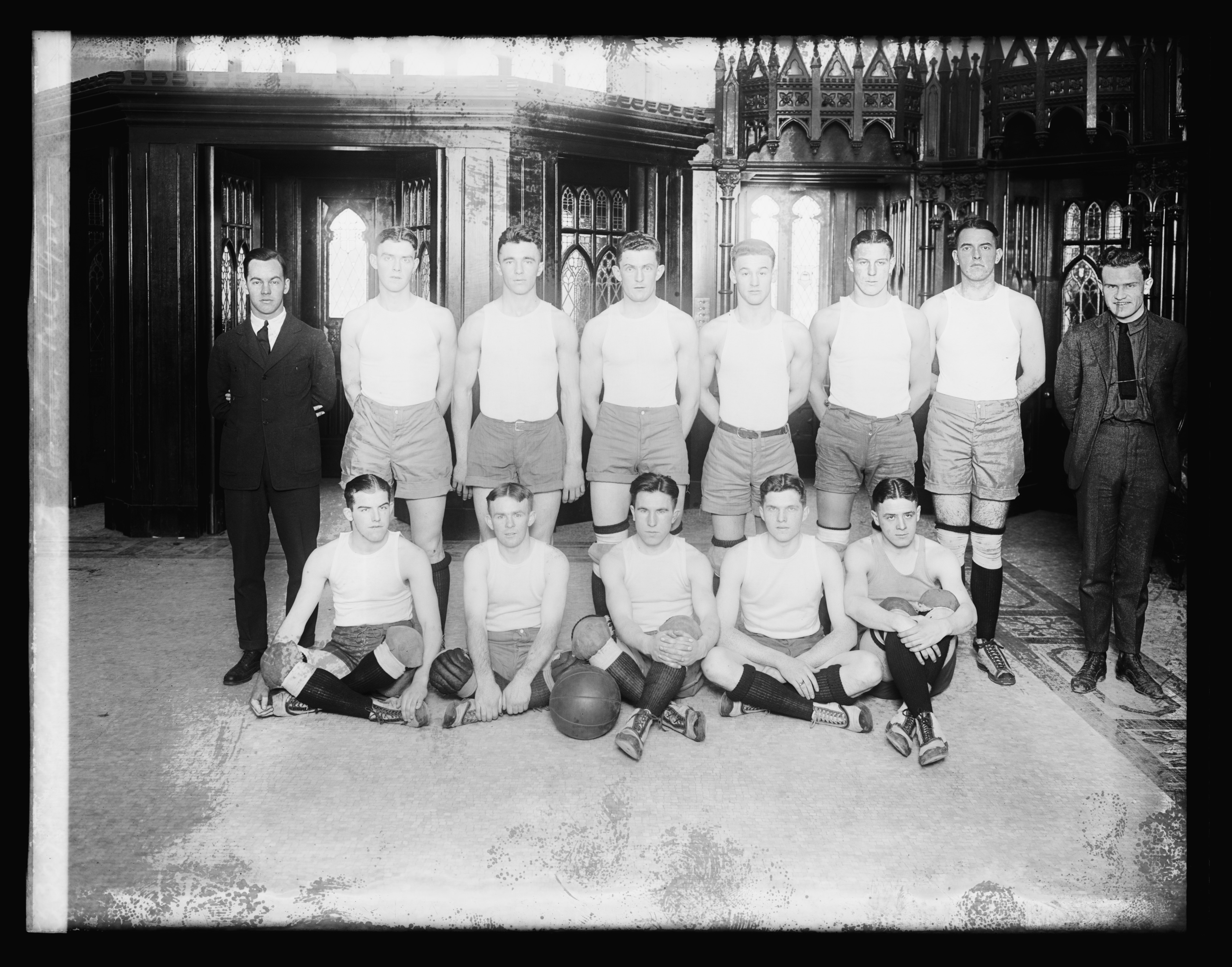
The 1930 Catholic Cardinals men's basketball team

==== Women's ====
The 2011–12 women's basketball team won the Landmark Conference title and made the program's first trip to the NCAA tournament. In 2013 they won their second straight Landmark Conference title and again received the LC's automatic berth into the NCAA tournament, repeating in 2015. In 2017, 2022 and 2024 they received an at-large bid.

Cardinals' NCAA D–III Tournament history
Year	Round	Opponent	Won/Lost	Result
2012	1st	Muhlenberg College	L	54–63
2013
2013	1st	Cabrini College	W	52–44
2013	2nd	Widener University	L	56–57
2015	1st	University of New England	L	50–54
2017	1st	Lynchburg College	L	64–69
2022	1st	Ithaca College	L	63-75
2024	1st	Penn State Erie, The Behrend College	W	71-55
2024	2nd	Washington and Lee University	L	70-80

=== Boxing ===
As a team, CUA won the national title in 1938. Besides, two Cardinals won individual championships:

- David Bernstein won the 1938 national championship in the 115-pound weight class.
- "Bingo" Stant Jr. won the 1939 national championship in the 165-pound weight class.

The NCAA discontinued boxing in 1961.

=== Football ===
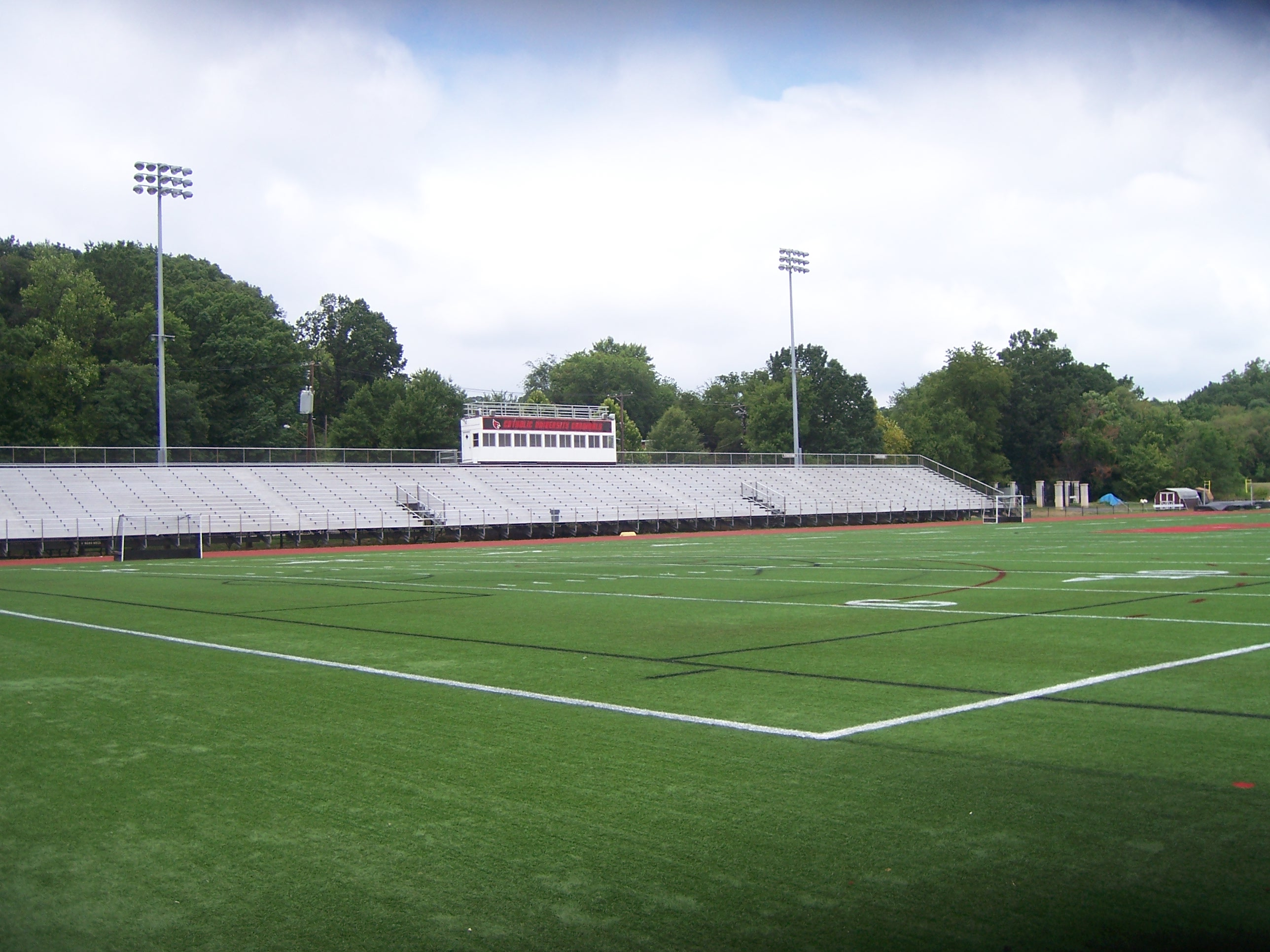
Cardinal Stadium, Catholic University Cardinals football field, in August 2011

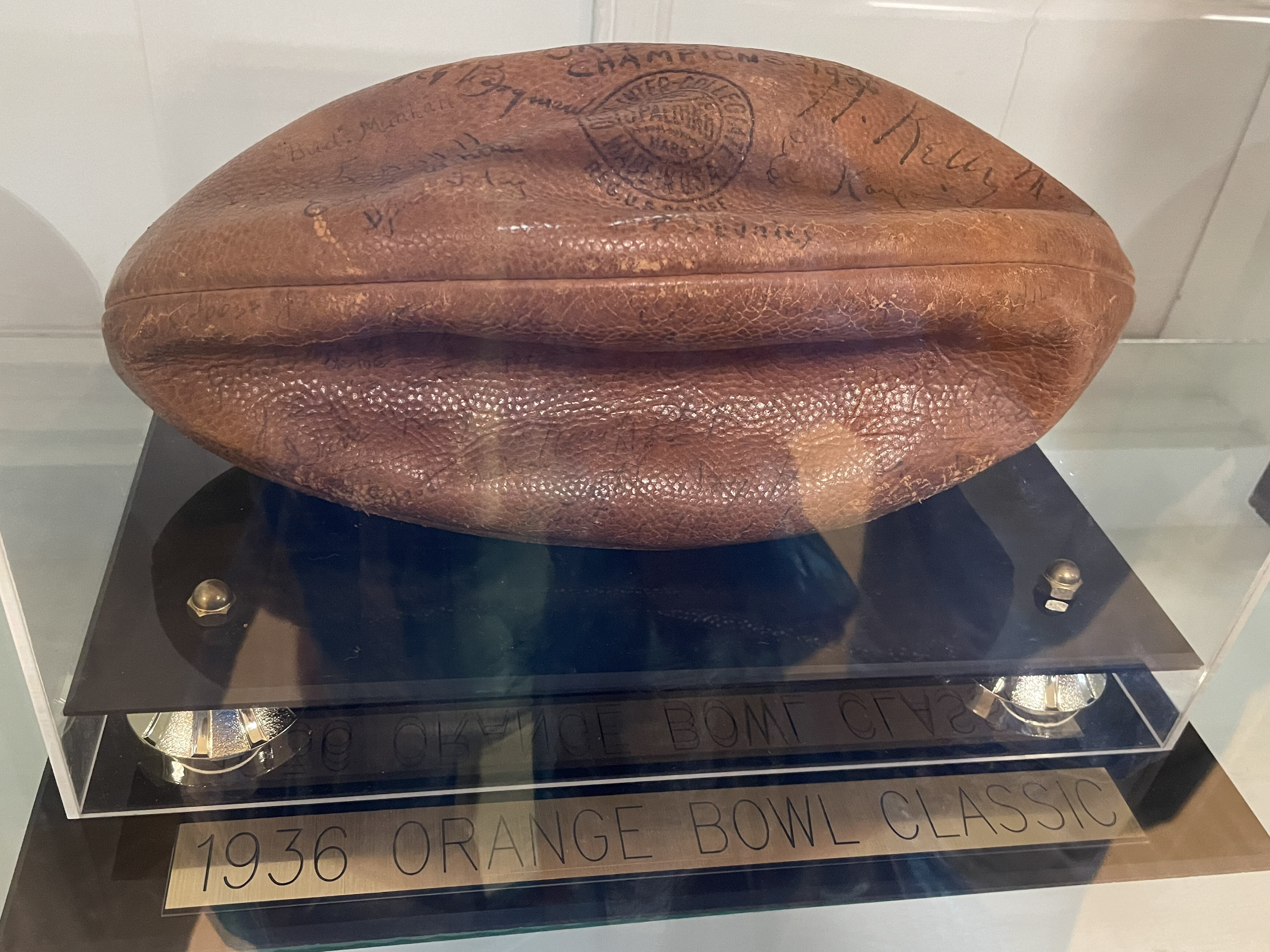
The 1936 Orange Bowl game ball

The football team appeared in two major bowl games, the 1936 Orange Bowl, which they won, and the 1940 Sun Bowl, which they tied. In the fall of 2008, already in Division III, the team went to the ECAC Southeast Bowl and defeated Johns Hopkins University 18–17 to give the Cards their first post season win since 1936.

Year	Bowl	Opponent	Result
1936	Orange Bowl	Mississippi	W 20–19
1940	Sun Bowl	Arizona State	T 0–0
2008	ECAC Southeast Bowl	Johns Hopkins	W 18–17
2022	New England Bowl	Bridgewater State	L 24-34

The team made three consecutive trips to the Division III playoffs in the late 1990s.

Cardinals' NCAA D–III Tournament history
Year	Round	Opponent	Won/Lost	Result
1997	1st	Trinity University	L	33–44
1998	1st	Lycoming College	L	14–49
1999	1st	McDaniel College	L	16–20

=== Track and field ===
The track & field team has produced four individual national champions:

- Mark Robinson won the NCAA Division II 800 meter outdoor championship in 1974 and 1975.
- Carolyn Hughes won the national championship in the 800 meters at the 1982 NCAA Division III Track & Field Championships.
- Tom Caffrey won the national championship in the 1500 meters at the 1991 Division III Track & Field Championships.
- Christian Di Nicolantonio won the national championship in pole vault at the 2024 NCAA Division III Outdoor Track & Field Championships.

=== Swimming ===
The men's swim team has won four Capitol Athletic Conference titles and three National Catholic Division III championships, while women's swimming has won a Catholic Division III title. The swimming program has two individual national titles as well:

- Keats Baugher won the national college division (Division II) championship in the 200 and 400 individual medley in 1965.

=== Lacrosse ===
==== Men's ====
The men's lacrosse team went to the NCAA tournament in 2015, 2016, 2021 and 2022 after winning the conference title.

Cardinals' NCAA D–III Tournament history
Year	Round	Opponent	Won/Lost	Result
2015	1st	Gettysburg College	L	3–19
2016	1st	Salisbury University	L	6–19
2021	1st	Stevens Institute of Technology	L	12–17
2022	2nd	St. John Fisher College	L	11–18

==== Women's ====
In 2008, the women's lacrosse team went undefeated in the inaugural year of the Landmark Conference and won the Conference post-season tournament, garnering a berth in the NCAA tournament for the first time in program history, and making it to the regional finals where they lost to Salisbury University. The team has won the Landmark Conference Tournament in 2008, 2009, 2010, 2011, 2012, 2014, 2015, 2016, 2017, 2018, 2019, 2021 and 2022.

Cardinals' NCAA D–III Tournament history
Year	Round	Opponent	Won/Lost	Result
2008
2008	1st	Christopher Newport University	W	18–16
2008	2nd	Rowan University	W	15–9
2008	Sectional Finals	Salisbury University	L	7–18
2009
2009	1st	Messiah College	W	9–8 (OT)
2009	2nd	University of Mary Washington	W	19–14
2009	Sectional Finals	Salisbury University	L	14–18
2010
2010	1st	Christopher Newport University	W	19–9
2010	2nd	Salisbury University	L	9–18
2011
2011	1st	University of Mary Washington	W	18–10
2011	2nd	The College of New Jersey	L	9–15
2012
2012	1st	Christopher Newport University	W	18–5
2012	2nd	University of Redlands	W	17–10
2012	Regional Final	Salisbury University	L	6–13
2014
2014	2nd	Franklin & Marshall College	L	11–17
2015
2015	2nd	Western New England University	W	22–5
2015	Sweet 16	University of Mount Union	W	21–8
2015	Elite Eight	SUNY Cortland	L	12–13
2016
2016	2nd	Messiah College	W	15–9
2016	3rd	Springfield College	W	12–10
2016	Elite Eight	SUNY Cortland	L	2–18
2017
2017	2nd	Washington & Jefferson College	W	20–1
2017	3rd	Washington and Lee University	L	6–9
2018
2018	1st	Johnson & Wales University	W	23–10
2018	2nd	Rowan University	W	14–11
2018	Regional semifinal	York College of Pennsylvania	L	6–13
2019
2019	1st	Albion College	W	19–5
2019	2nd	University of Mount Union	W	16–6
2019	Regional semifinal	Amherst College	L	6–9
2021
2021	1st	Becker College	W	24–3
2021	2nd	St. John Fisher College	L	9–15
2022
2022	1st	Saint Mary's College	W	27–5
2022	2nd	Denison University	L	12–13

=== Soccer ===
==== Men's ====
The men's soccer team went to the NCAA tournament in 2009, 2010, 2013 (at-large bid), 2014, 2019, 2021, 2022 (at-large bid) and 2023.

Cardinals' NCAA D–III Tournament history
Year	Round	Opponent	Won/Lost	Result
2009	1st	Lynchburg	L	0–3
2010	1st	Ohio Wesleyan University	L	1–2
2013	1st	Franklin & Marshall College	L	0–1
2014
2014	1st	United States Coast Guard Academy	W	2–0
2014	2nd	Muhlenberg College	L	0–0 (2OT); 3–5 (pen.)
2019	1st	Connecticut College	L	1–2
2021	1st	Kenyon College	L	1–4
2022
2022	1st	Lynchburg	W	2–0
2022	2nd	Christopher Newport	W	2–0 (2OT)
2022	Sweet Sixteen	Johns Hopkins	L	0-2
2023	1st	SUNY Oneonta	L	1-2

==== Women's ====
Women's soccer went undefeated in the CAC in 2005 and earned a berth in the NCAA tournament, repeating in 2009, 2014 and 2015 as LC champions.

Cardinals' NCAA D–III Tournament history
Year	Round	Opponent	Won/Lost	Result
2005	1st	Lynchburg College	L	1–5
2009	1st	Lynchburg College	L	1–3
2014
2014	1st	Hanover College	W	3–2
2014	2nd	Carnegie Mellon University	L	1–2 (OT)
2015
2015	1st	Ithaca College	W	1–0
2015	2nd	Swarthmore College	L	0–1

=== Field hockey ===
The field hockey team advanced to the 2001 ECAC Southern Region championship game and won the ECAC title in 2010. In 2011 CUA won its first conference championship, which propelled the Cardinals to their first-ever NCAA tournament. They won the conference title again in 2012, and 2013. In 2014, the team earned an at-large bid and a first round bye to big dance. In 2015 and 2022, they were again Landmark Conference champions.

Cardinals' NCAA D–III Tournament history
Year	Round	Opponent	Won/Lost	Result
2011
2011	1st	Eastern University	W	5–2
2011	2nd	Lynchburg College	L	0–2
2012	1st	Lynchburg College	L	3–4 (OT)
2013
2013	1st	Messiah College	W	2–1 (OT)
2013	2nd	DePauw University	W	1–0 (OT)
2013	Elite Eight	Christopher Newport University	L	0–1
2014
2014	2nd	Messiah College	W	2–0
2014	Elite Eight	The College of New Jersey	L	0–1
2015	1st	Bridgewater College	L	1–2
2022	1st	Trinity College	L	0–1

=== Volleyball ===
The volleyball team made its first NCAA tournament appearance in 2001 and followed it up in 2002.

Cardinals' NCAA D–III Tournament history
Year	Round	Opponent	Won/Lost	Result
2001
2001	2nd	Gettysburg College	W	3–1 (30–22, 30–19, 22–30, 30–27)
2001	Mid-Atlantic Regional Final	Juniata College	L	0–3 (20–30, 19–30, 13–30)
2002	Mid-Atlantic Regional Final	Ohio Northern University	L	0–3 (21–30, 24–30, and 15–30)

=== Softball ===
The softball team won its first and only Capital Athletic Conference title in 1994, and went on to become the ECAC Southern Region Champions in the same season. In 2012 the Cardinals won the ECAC Southern Region Championship for the second time. In 2014 CUA won its first Landmark Conference championship, which propelled the Cardinals to their first-ever NCAA tournament.

Cardinals' NCAA D–III Tournament history
Year	Round	Opponent	Won/Lost	Result
2014
2014	Norfolk Regional	Christopher Newport	L	1–6
2014	Norfolk Regional	Staten Island	W	11–5
2014	Norfolk Regional	Virginia Wesleyan	L	3–6

=== Golf ===
==== Men's ====
The men's golf team went to the NCAA tournament in 2021 after winning the conference championship.

==== Women's ====
The women's golf team went to the NCAA tournament in 2021 after winning the conference championship.

== Club Sports ==
Student-led club teams include rugby, ice hockey, lacrosse, and sailing. Rugby will become a varsity sport in 2026.

=== Rugby ===
- The men's rugby team competes in the Mid-Atlantic Rugby Conference of the NSCRO. Men's Rugby will become a varsity sport in 2026
- The women's rugby team competes in the Mid-Atlantic Rugby Conference of the NSCRO and was runner-up at the 2018 NSCRO Women's National Championship.

=== Ice Hockey ===
The ice hockey team competes in the Delaware Valley Collegiate Hockey Conference (DVCHC) of the ACHA and plays at the Fort Dupont Ice Arena in Washington, D.C. The Cardinals secured their first championship in 2009, defeating Alvernia University 2–1 to win the Mason-Dixon Collegiate Hockey Association title, capping off a 14–4–2 season. The team went 13–0–0 during the 2014–15 season and went on to win the Blue Ridge Hockey Conference (BRHC) Championship in a 5–4 victory against the Maryland Terrapins. In 2017 the team transferred to the DVCHC. On February 10, 2019, the Cardinals secured an 11–5 victory at York College to win the 2018 Championship. They went 15–3–0 that season.

Cardinals' D–III Championships
Year	Opponent	Won/Lost	Result
2009	Alvernia University	W	2–1
2010	Appalachian State University	L	6–5
2014	University of Maryland	W	5–4
2018	York College	W	11–5

=== Lacrosse ===
The men's club lacrosse team competes in Division 2 of the Chesapeake Conference in the National College Lacrosse League. The team secured the NCLL Division 2 National Championship for 2015, 2016, and 2017.

Cardinals' NCLL D–II Championships
Year	Opponent	Won/Lost	Result
2015	n/a	W	n/a
2016	n/a	W	n/a
2017	n/a	W	n/a

=== Sailing ===
- The sailing team was founded in 1949 by the famous sailors Donald M. Street Jr., Ed Rogers, and Boomer Curran. The team competes in the Middle Atlantic Intercollegiate Sailing Association of the ICSA.

== Facilities ==
- Raymond A. DuFour Athletic Center (Offices)
- Cardinal Stadium (FB, FH)
- Franny Murray Court (MBB, WBB, VB)
- Carlini Field (MSOC, WSOC, MLAX, WLAX)
- DuFour Center Pool (MSWIM, WSWIM)
- Robert J. Talbot Field (Baseball)
- Softball Field
- Dowd Family Tennis Courts (MTEN, WTEN)
- Hanley Family Weight Room

== Rivalries ==
An important rivalry in Cardinals' history has been the football game against the Georgetown Hoyas, where the Steven Dean Memorial Trophy is in dispute. The series started at Brookland Stadium in 1976.

Since 2022, the Pope's Cup is in dispute in all sports against Marymount University.

== Songs ==
=== Alma mater songs ===
The official Alma Mater Song was adopted in 1920, when students organized a contest for an alma mater song, open to the then all-male student body. The winner was Hail CUA (lyrics by Robert H. Mahoney and music by Victor Herbert), but second-place winner Guardian of Truth (music and lyrics by Thomas J. McLean) became more popular over the years.

=== Fight song ===
The cardinals' fight song is "C.U. Marching Song" (1931): (Music by Michael J. MacDonald & Lyrics by Clement Ducy)

Sing a song of C.U.A. for all the world to hear,
Drink a toast to Alma Mater, praise her far and near,
Make a vow you'll e'er be true and do what she taught right,
Whether we win or whether we lose, we'll never give up the fight,
Down the field the men in red and black go marching on
To victory, to victory,
Driving all before them in the struggle toward the goal
Of victory, of victory.
Onward we're marching with all our might,
Marching for C.U. never yielding, ever cheering, FIGHT!
Forever onward we're marching to victory,
For the Red and Black is winning
For C.U.A. it's Fight, Fight, Fight.
Crimson and Black are above all the rest.
Always a shout and a cheer, FIGHT!
Always our colors stand out with the best,
Onward forever against any odds,
Bringing the victory near.

=== CUA songs and cheers ===
Students supporting the games in the early 1900s created the following songs and chants to inspire high spirits:

==== CUA (CU Will Shine) ====
On, CUA, we’re rooting for you
And we know you’ll win today,
So battle hard, whatever befall you
For the name of CUA (Rah-Rah)
Go down the field,
And cross the goal line
With that CU pep and fight,
And when the grand old game is over,
CUA will shine tonight.
CU will shine tonight
CU will shine,
CU will shine tonight,
All down the line.
CU will shine tonight,
CU will shine,
When the sun goes down and the moon comes up,
CU will shine.

==== Drink a Highball ====
Drink a highball at nightfall,
Be good fellows while you may,
For tomorrow may bring sorrow,
So tonight let’s all be gay,
Tell the story of the glory,
Of the Catholic University,
Drink a highball,
Let’s be jolly –
Here’s the health of CUA.

==== Flying Cardinals ====
Fight Hard, Hit Hard, Buck that line!
Every man must do his part for victory!
For the honor of the red and black,
We stand behind the fighting varsity!
With our colors proudly flying high,
We will march today to victories new!
We all will back you to the limit,
Fight hard every minute,
Victory come to old CU.
Give three cheers for CU!
RAH RAH
Let us banish fear for vict’ry!
RAH RAH RAH
Everybody up!
Everybody shout
To our fighting boys of CUA!
We cheer, boys!

== National team championships ==
=== Division I ===
- Boxing: 1938 (unofficial)

=== Division III ===
- Men's basketball: 2001

== Notable athletes ==
- Brian Cashman, B.A. 1989, Senior Vice-President and General Manager, New York Yankees
- Edward Lynch, LL.B. 1924, featured at Ripley's Believe It or Not! for making 98 tackles in a single football game.
- Jimmy Patsos, B.A. 1989, men's basketball head coach, Siena Saints men's basketball
- Wally Pipp, A.B. 1914, first base, New York Yankees
- Rocco Pirro, football fullback who played for the Pittsburgh Steelers.
