= Lance Ratchford =

American baseball player and coach

Current position
- Title: Head coach
- Team: Marist
- Conference: MAAC
- Record: 87–129 (.403)

Biographical details
- Born: October 5, 1988 (age 38); Oneonta, New York, U.S.
- Education: Keystone College

Playing career
- 2008–2010: Mansfield
- 2011: Keystone
- Position: Infielder

Coaching career (HC unless noted)
- 2012–2015: SUNY Oneonta (AC)
- 2016–2018: Marist (AC)
- 2019–2022: SUNY Cobleskill
- 2023–present: Marist

Head coaching record
- Overall: 147–185 (.443)
- Tournaments: NCAA: 0–0

Lance Ratchford (born October 5, 1988) is an American baseball coach and former infielder, who is the current head baseball coach of the Marist Red Foxes. He played college baseball at Mansfield University of Pennsylvania from 2008 to 2010 before transferring to Keystone College. He has also been the head coach of the SUNY Cobleskill Fighting Tigers (2019–2022). Under Ratchford the Fighting Tigers captured back to back Conference Division Titles in 2021 and 2022. After the 2022 season Ratchford was named North Atlantic Conference (NAC) Coach of the Year.

== Playing career ==
Ratchford attended Oneonta High School in Oneonta, New York. During his senior year Ratchford earned 2nd Team All-State honors from the NYSSWA. He would go on to play college baseball at Mansfield University of Pennsylvania from 2008 to 2010 before transferring to Keystone College. As a senior in 2011, he helped Keystone advance to the NCAA Division III World Series, where they finished tied for third. The Giants won the New York Regional tournament and he was named to the NCAA Regional All-Tournament Team. The 2011 Keystone team was inducted into the school’s Hall of Fame in 2021.

== Coaching career ==
In 2015 and 2016, and again in 2021 and 2022, Ratchford served as assistant coach of the Brewster Whitecaps, a collegiate summer baseball team in the Cape Cod Baseball League. The Whitecaps won the Cape Cod Baseball League Championship in 2021. On August 9, 2022, Ratchford was named the head coach of the Marist Red Foxes. Ratchford returns to Marist, having served as assistant coach under former head coach Chris Tracz from 2016-18. As an assistant, Ratchford helped the Red Foxes capture the 2017 MAAC Championship and earn a trip to the Gainesville Regional.

== Head coaching record ==
Record table
Season	Team	Overall	Conference	Standing	Postseason
SUNY Cobleskill Fighting Tigers (North Eastern Athletic Conference) (2019–2020)
2019	SUNY Cobleskill	16–22	9–9	T-4th	NEAC Tournament
2020	SUNY Cobleskill	8–5	0–0	NA	Season canceled due to COVID-19
SUNY Cobleskill Fighting Tigers (North Atlantic Conference) (2021–2022)
2021	SUNY Cobleskill	15–9	10–4	1st (West)	NAC Tournament
2022	SUNY Cobleskill	21–20	11–4	1st (West)	NAC Tournament
SUNY Cobleskill:		60–56 (.517)	30–17 (.638)		
Marist Red Foxes (Metro Atlantic Athletic Conference) (2023–present)
2023	Marist	16–36	10–14	T-7th	
2024	Marist	20–35	10–14	6th	MAAC Tournament
2025	Marist	26–28	14–14	7th	MAAC Tournament
2026	Marist	25–30	17–13	T-5th	MAAC Tournament
2027	Marist	0–0	0–0		
Marist:		87–129 (.403)	51–55 (.481)		
Total:		147–185 (.443)			
National champion Postseason invitational champion Conference regular season champion Conference regular season and conference tournament champion Division regular season champion Division regular season and conference tournament champion Conference tournament champion
