= 2010 NCAA Division III baseball tournament =

- Season: 2010
- Teams: 55
- Finals site: Time Warner Cable Field at Fox Cities Stadium; Grand Chute, Wisconsin
- Champions: Illinois Wesleyan (1st title)
- Runner-up: SUNY Cortland

The 2010 NCAA Division III baseball tournament was played at the end of the 2010 NCAA Division III baseball season to determine the 35th national champion of college baseball at the NCAA Division III level. The tournament concluded with eight teams competing at Time Warner Cable Field at Fox Cities Stadium in Grand Chute, Wisconsin for the championship. Eight regional tournaments were held to determine the participants in the World Series. Regional tournaments were contested in double-elimination format, with four regions consisting of six teams, one consisting of seven, and three consisting of eight, for a total of 55 teams participating in the tournament, up from 54 in 2009. The tournament champion was Illinois Wesleyan, who defeated SUNY Cortland for the championship.

== Bids ==
The 55 competing teams were:

== Regionals ==
Bold indicates winner.

=== New York Regional ===
Leo Pinckney Field at Falcon Park-Auburn, NY (Host: State University of New York at Cortland)

First round/elimination round 1	Second round/elimination round 2	Semifinals/elimination semifinals	Finals
4	Skidmore	0
5	**Keene State**	**1**
Keene State	4
**SUNY Cortland**	**12**
1	**SUNY Cortland**	**10**
8	Castleton State	2
**SUNY Cortland**	**6**
St. John Fisher	1
3	Oneonta State	5
6	**Farmingdale State**	**9**
Farmingdale State	7
**St. John Fisher**	**8**
2	**St. John Fisher**	**3**
7	Brockport	2	**SUNY Cortland**	**7**	---
St. John Fisher	6	--
Lower round 1	Lower round 2	Lower round 3	Lower final
Farmingdale State	9
Skidmore	6	**Castleton State**	**10**	**St. John Fisher**	**6**
**Castleton State**	**7**	Castleton State	2	Oneonta State	5^{11}
**Oneonta State**	**9**
Keene State	2
**Oneonta State**	**9**	**Oneonta State**	**5**
Brockport	7

=== Midwest Regional ===
Prucha Field at James B. Miller Stadium-Whitewater, WI (Host: University of Wisconsin-Whitewater)

First round
1	**Wisconsin-Whitewater**	**6**
6	Aurora	1
2	**St. Thomas (MN)**	**14**
5	Carthage	6
3	St. Scholastica	1
4	**Wisconsin-Stevens Point**	**12**

Second round/elimination round 1
**Wisconsin-Whitewater**	**6**
St. Scholastica	2
St. Thomas (MN)	1
**Wisconsin-Stevens Point**	**2**
Aurora	5
**Carthage**	**10**

Semifinals/elimination round 2
Wisconsin-Whitewater	4
**Wisconsin-Stevens Point**	**12**
**St. Thomas (MN)**	**7**
Carthage	5

Elimination final
**Wisconsin-Whitewater**	**5**
St. Thomas (MN)	4

Final
**Wisconsin-Stevens Point**	3	**4**
Wisconsin-Whitewater	**9**	3

=== New England Regional ===
Eastern Baseball Stadium-Mansfield, CT (Host: Eastern Connecticut State University)

First round/elimination round 1	Second round/elimination round 2	Semifinals/elimination semifinals	Finals
4	**Eastern Connecticut State**	**10**
5	Worcester State	4
Eastern Connecticut State	0
**Tufts**	**3**
1	**Tufts**	**12**
8	St. Joseph's (ME)	3
Tufts	2
**Mass-Boston**	**3**
3	**Western New England**	**10**
6	Westfield State	3
Western New England	4
**Mass-Boston**	**6**
2	Wheaton (MA)	3
7	**Mass-Boston**	**12**	**Mass-Boston**	**12**	--
Tufts	6	--
Lower round 1	Lower round 2	Lower round 3	Lower final
Western New England	2
Worcester State	4	**St. Joseph's (ME)**	**3**	**Tufts**	**6**
**St. Joseph's (ME)**	**5**^{12}	**St. Joseph's (ME)**	**9**	St. Joseph's (ME)	5^{11}
Wheaton (MA)	7
Eastern Connecticut State	4
Westfield State	5	**Wheaton (MA)**	**9**
**Wheaton (MA)**	**9**

=== West Regional ===
Roy Helser Field and Jim Wright Stadium-McMinnville, OR (Host: Linfield College)

First round
1	**Chapman**	**4**
6	Trinity (TX)	3
2	**Linfield**	**6**
5	Mississippi College	1
3	**Pomona-Pitzer**	**12**
4	Texas-Tyler	6

Second round/elimination round 1
Chapman	4
**Texas-Tyler**	**5**
Trinity (TX)	4
**Mississippi College**	**5**^{11}
Linfield	4
**Pomona-Pitzer**	**10**
Chapman	0
**Linfield**	**6**

Third round/elimination round 2
Texas-Tyler	8
**Mississippi College**	**9**
Pomona-Pitzer	0
**Linfield**	**10**

Elimination final
**Mississippi College**	**6**
Pomona-Pitzer	5

Final
Mississippi College	3
**Linfield**	**12**

=== Mideast Regional ===
Don Schaly Field-Marietta, OH (Host: Marietta College)

First round/elimination round 1	Second round/elimination round 2	Semifinals/elimination semifinals	Finals
4	Washington & Jefferson	7
5	**Adrian**	**9**^{10}
Adrian	8
1	**Heidelberg**	**9**
**Heidelberg**	**9**
Penn State-Behrend	2
3	Marietta	3
6	**Thomas More**	**5**^{10}
Thomas More	6
**Penn State-Behrend**	**7**
2	Wooster	8
7	**Penn State-Behrend**	**10**^{10}	**Heidelberg**	**6**	--
Marietta	2	--
Lower round 1	Lower round 2	Lower round 3	Lower final
Adrian	5
**Thomas More**	**8**	Penn State-Behrend	1
Thomas More	4	**Marietta**	**2**^{10}
**Marietta**	**16**
Washington & Jefferson	1
**Marietta**	**6**	**Marietta**	**11**
Wooster	0

=== Mid-Atlantic Regional ===
Samuel J. Plumeri, Sr. Field at Mercer County Waterfront Park-Trenton, NJ (Host: Kean University)

First round/elimination round 1	Second round/elimination round 2	Semifinals/elimination semifinals	Finals
4	Alvernia	3
5	**Keystone**	**13**
Keystone	4
**Johns Hopkins**	**9**
1	**Johns Hopkins**	**13**
8	Moravian	4
**Johns Hopkins**	**9**
Rowan	4
3	Widener	5
6	**Rowan**	**14**
**Rowan**	**8**
Kean	3
2	**Kean**	**3**
7	Manhattanville	0	**Johns Hopkins**	6	**8**
Kean	**9**	3
Lower round 1	Lower round 2	Lower round 3	Lower final
**Kean**	**3**
Alvernia	7	Alvernia	2	Rowan	3
Moravian	3	**Kean**	**8**	**Kean**	**4**
Widener	2
Keystone	3
**Widener**	**9**	**Widener**	**7**
Manhattanville	2

=== South Regional ===
Armstrong-Shelly Field-Fayetteville, NC (Host: Methodist University)

First round
1	**Shenandoah**	**11**
6	Bridgewater (VA)	1
2	Salisbury	1
5	**LaGrange**	**3**
3	**Mary Washington**	**6**
4	York (PA)	5

Second round/elimination round 1
**Shenandoah**	**9**
York (PA)	6
LaGrange	2
**Mary Washington**	**6**
Bridgewater (VA)	2
**Salisbury**	**9**

Semifinals/elimination round 2
**Shenandoah**	**10**
Mary Washington	5
LaGrange	1
**Salisbury**	**12**

Elimination final
Mary Washington	6
**Salisbury**	**11**

Final
**Shenandoah**	**6**	--
Salisbury	4	--

=== Central Regional ===
Brunner Field in the Duane R. Swanson Stadium-Rock Island, IL (Host: Augustana College)

First round
1	Buena Vista	1
6	**Illinois Wesleyan**	**2**
2	North Central (IL)	4
5	**Rose-Hulman**	**5**^{11}
3	Ripon	0
4	**Webster**	**6**

Second round/elimination round 1
**Illinois Wesleyan**	**14**
Ripon	8
Rose-Hulman	1
**Webster**	**7**
**Buena Vista**	**8**
North Central (IL)	5

Semifinals/elimination round 2
**Illinois Wesleyan**	**8**
Webster	3
Rose-Hulman	6
**Buena Vista**	**11**

Elimination final
Webster	8
**Buena Vista**	**13**

Final
**Illinois Wesleyan**	**10**	--
Buena Vista	3	--

== World Series ==
Time Warner Cable Field at Fox Cities Stadium-Grand Chute, WI (Host: University of Wisconsin-Oshkosh/Lawrence University/Fox Cities Convention and Visitors Bureau)

Upper round 1
NY1	SUNY Cortland	9
MW4	Wisconsin-Stevens Point	8
NE7	Mass-Boston	0
W2	Linfield	12
ME1	Heidelberg	3
MA1	Johns Hopkins	2
S1	Shenandoah	5
C6	Illinois Wesleyan	7

Upper round 2
SUNY Cortland	11
Linfield	25
Heidelberg	3
Illinois Wesleyan	4
Lower round 1
Johns Hopkins	7
Shenandoah	4
Wisconsin-Stevens Point	13
Mass-Boston	3

Upper final
Linfield	3
Illinois Wesleyan	4
Lower round 2
SUNY Cortland	23
Johns Hopkins	8
Heidelberg	8
Wisconsin-Stevens Point	3

Semifinals
Illinois Wesleyan	10
SUNY Cortland	11
Linfield	6
Heidelberg	4

Preliminary final
SUNY Cortland	12
Linfield	9

Final
Illinois Wesleyan	17
SUNY Cortland	5
