= Oneonta High School =

High school in Oneonta, New York

Oneonta Senior High School
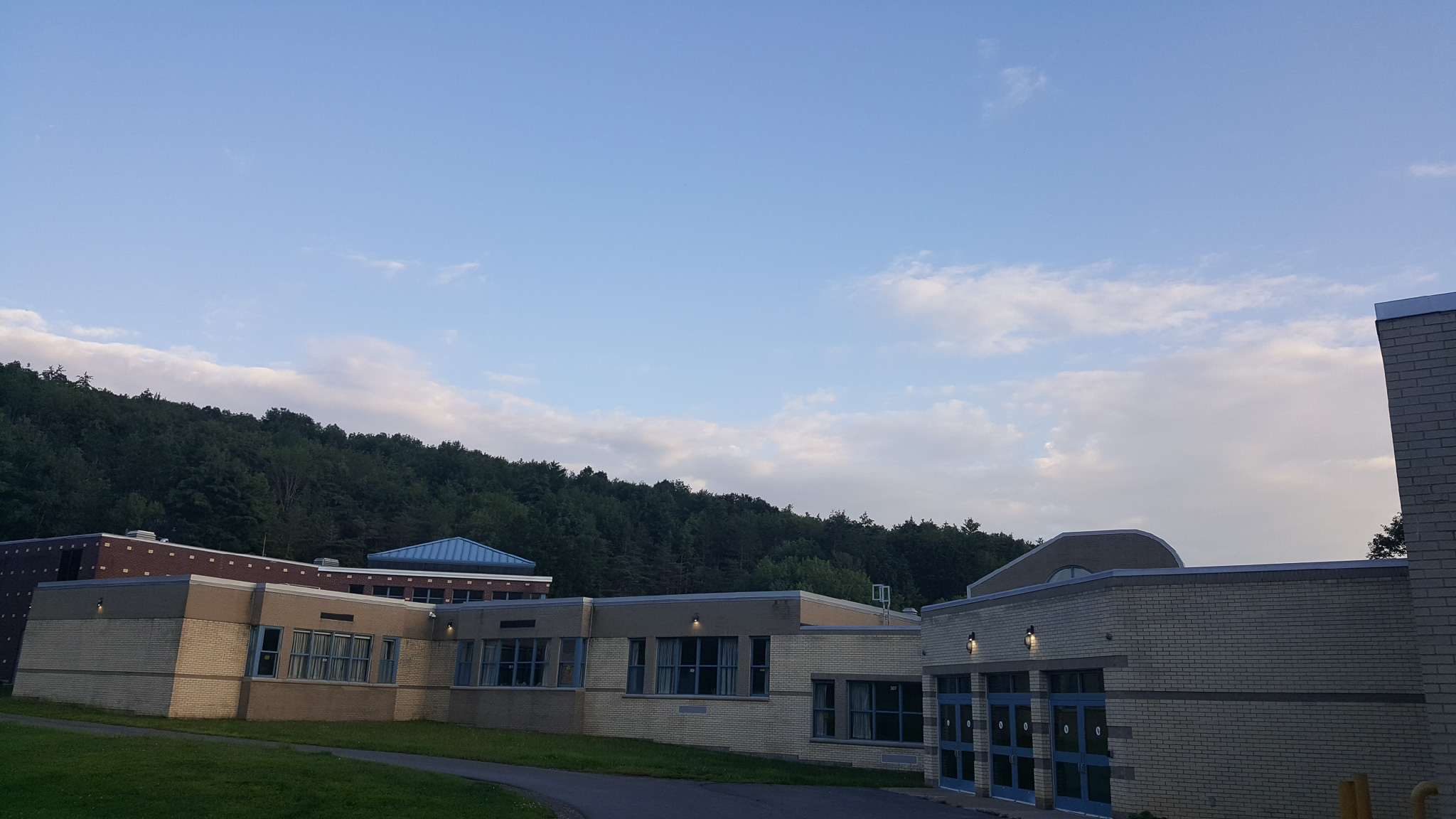

Location
- 130 Upper East Street; Oneonta, New York 13820; United States; 42°28′10″N 75°03′06″W

Information
- Type: Public high school
- School district: Oneonta City School District
- Principal: Kevin Stevens
- Grades: 9–12
- Gender: Coeducational
- Enrollment: 494 (2025-2026)
- Colors: Royal Blue and Yellow
- Athletics conference: Southern Tier Athletic Conference, NYSPHAA Section IV, Class C
- Mascot: Yellowjacket
- Website: www.oneontacsd.org/o/ohs

Oneonta Senior High School (commonly known as Oneonta High School) is a public high school in Oneonta, New York. It serves grades 9–12 and is the only high school in the Oneonta City School District. The first high school in Oneonta was incorporated in 1874; the present school building, at 130 Upper East Street, opened in 1964.

== School ==
As of 2025, Oneonta Senior High School had 494 students, of whom 23.4% were minority and 39% were economically disadvantaged. The principal is Kevin Stevens. The school's sports teams are the Yellowjackets.

== History ==
Oneonta's first high school was incorporated on November 6, 1874. Its library was noted in 1915. In 1913 at the school's 42nd commencement 53 students graduated, its largest class up to that point.

The first modern high school opened in 1908, on the site of the former Union School on Academy Street. It was a three-story building in classical style, with statuary throughout the interior. Almost 600 people attended the school's first college night in 1938. School activities included a Key Club, founded in 1948.

The high school continued to include elementary grades until 1927, when a junior high school was opened on an adjacent site. In 1964, the high school moved to its present building on East Street, which unlike the former building, had on-site sports facilities. The Academy Street building became part of the junior high school, and was demolished in 1977 after the middle school moved to a new building next to the high school. In the 1990s, the high school was renovated and a science wing added.

Oneonta Senior High School was the subject of a 1954 master's thesis examining high school dropouts.

== Athletics ==
Oneonta Senior High School is a member of the Southern Tier Athletic Conference (STAC). They are also part of the New York Public High School Athletic Association (NYPSAA) under Section IV, Class C.

Oneonta's mascot is a Yellowjacket, taking inspiration from the Georgia Tech Yellowjackets.

== Alumni ==
- Irving Ives, state senator and U.S. senator who was a leader in anti-discrimination legislation
- Mark May, football player and broadcaster
- Lance Ratchford, baseball player and former coach

== See also ==
- List of high schools in New York (state)
