= 2013 NCAA Division III baseball tournament =

- Season: 2013
- Teams: 56
- Finals site: Time Warner Cable Field at Fox Cities Stadium; Grand Chute, Wisconsin
- Champions: Linfield (1st title)
- Runner-up: Southern Maine

The 2013 NCAA Division III baseball tournament was played at the end of the 2013 NCAA Division III baseball season to determine the 38th national champion of college baseball at the NCAA Division III level. The tournament concluded with eight teams competing at Time Warner Cable Field at Fox Cities Stadium in Grand Chute, Wisconsin for the championship. Eight regional tournaments were held to determine the participants in the World Series. Regional tournaments were contested in double-elimination format, with four regions consisting of six teams, and four consisting of eight, for a total of 56 teams participating in the tournament. The tournament champion was Linfield, who defeated Southern Maine for the championship.

== Bids ==
The 56 competing teams were:

== Regionals ==
Bold indicates winner.

=== New England Regional ===
Whitehouse Field-Harwich, MA (Host: Eastern College Athletic Conference)

First round/elimination round 1	Second round/elimination round 2	Semifinals/elimination semifinals	Finals
4	**Western New England**	**5**
5	MIT	2
Western New England	5
**Southern Maine**	**6**
1	**Southern Maine**	**5**
8	Daniel Webster	0
Southern Maine	2
**Endicott**	**5**
3	**Endicott**	**4**
6	St. Joseph's (ME)	3
**Endicott**	**3**
Wheaton (MA)	2^{10}
2	**Wheaton (MA)**	**5**
7	Salem State	3	Endicott	2	0
**Southern Maine**	**5**	**9**
Lower round 1	Lower round 2	Lower round 3	Lower final
**Wheaton (MA)**	**3**
MIT	4	Daniel Webster	1	**Southern Maine**	**7**
**Daniel Webster**	**10**	Wheaton (MA)	3	Western New England	0
**Western New England**	**8**
**Western New England**	**5**
**St. Joseph's (ME)**	**7**	St. Joseph's (ME)	3
Salem State	5

=== South Regional ===
USA Stadium-Millington, TN (Host: Rhodes College)

First round
1	Huntingdon	3
6	**Methodist**	**4**^{10}
2	**Salisbury**	**3**
5	Randolph-Macon	2
3	**Millsaps**	**7**
4	Bridgewater (VA)	0

Second round/elimination round 1
Methodist	7
**Bridgewater (VA)**	**10**
**Huntingdon**	**5**
Randolph-Macon	0
**Salisbury**	**11**
Millsaps	5
Methodist	2
**Millsaps**	**8**

Third round/elimination round 2
Bridgewater (VA)	2
**Huntingdon**	**6**
Salisbury	0
**Millsaps**	**7**

Elimination final
Huntingdon	3
**Salisbury**	**9**

Final
Salisbury	6
**Millsaps**	**7**

=== West Regional ===
Tornado Field-Austin, TX (Host: Concordia University Texas)

First round
1	**Linfield**	**2**
6	Texas Lutheran	0
2	Cal Lutheran	0
5	**Trinity (TX)**	**1**
3	**Texas-Tyler**	**4**
4	Pomona-Pitzer	3^{11}

Second round/elimination round 1
**Linfield**	**8**
Pomona-Pitzer	3
**Trinity (TX)**	**4**
Texas-Tyler	2
Texas Lutheran	3
**Cal Lutheran**	**4**

Semifinals/elimination round 2
**Linfield**	**4**
Trinity (TX)	3
**Texas-Tyler**	**3**
Cal Lutheran	2

Elimination final
**Trinity (TX)**	**3**
Texas-Tyler	1

Final
**Linfield**	2	**3**
Trinity (TX)	**3**	1

=== New York Regional ===
Leo Pinckney Field at Falcon Park-Auburn, NY (Host: Ithaca College)

First round/elimination round 1	Second round/elimination round 2	Semifinals/elimination semifinals	Finals
4	**Farmingdale State**	**7**
5	Neumann	2
Farmingdale State	1
**Ithaca**	**4**
1	**Ithaca**	**11**
8	Moravian	2
**Ithaca**	**3**
Amherst	2
3	Rowan	8
6	**Amherst**	**10**
**Amherst**	**6**
SUNY Cortland	3
2	**SUNY Cortland**	**4**
7	Rensselaer	3	**Ithaca**	**4**	--
SUNY Cortland	2	--
Lower round 1	Lower round 2	Lower round 3	Lower final
**SUNY Cortland**	**4**
**Neumann**	**5**	Neumann	0	Amherst	1
Moravian	3	**SUNY Cortland**	**5**	**SUNY Cortland**	**3**
Rensselaer	2
Farmingdale State	5
Rowan	2	**Rensselaer**	**6**
**Rensselaer**	**5**

=== Mideast Regional ===
Art Nehf Field-Terre Haute, IN (Host: Rose-Hulman Institute of Technology)

First round/elimination round 1	Second round/elimination round 2	Semifinals/elimination semifinals	Finals
4	Illinois Wesleyan	3
5	**Washington & Jefferson**	**5**
Washington & Jefferson	2
**Manchester**	**4**
1	**Manchester**	**12**
8	Mt. Union	3
**Manchester**	**10**
Marietta	5
3	Wooster	4
6	**Thomas More**	**20**
Thomas More	1
**Marietta**	**16**
2	**Marietta**	**11**
7	Penn State-Behrend	1	**Manchester**	**8**	--
Marietta	5	--
Lower round 1	Lower round 2	Lower round 3	Lower final
**Thomas More**	**10**
**Illinois Wesleyan**	**5**	Illinois Wesleyan	6	**Marietta**	**6**
Mt. Union	2	Thomas More	8	Washington & Jefferson	2
**Washington & Jefferson**	**11**^{15}
**Washington & Jefferson**	**8**
**Wooster**	**3**	Wooster	7^{13}
Penn State-Behrend	2

=== Midwest Regional ===
Prucha Field at James B. Miller Stadium-Whitewater, WI (Host: University of Wisconsin-Whitewater)

First round
1	**St. Scholastica**	**1**
6	St. Thomas (MN)	0
2	**Wisconsin-Stevens Point**	**6**
5	Benedictine	5^{10}
3	**Wisconsin-Whitewater**	**2**
4	Case-Western	0

Second round/elimination round 1
St. Scholastica	1
**Case-Western**	**3**
**St. Thomas (MN)**	**10**
Benedictine	1
**Wisconsin-Stevens Point**	**7**
Wisconsin-Whitewater	6^{10}
**St. Scholastica**	**3**
Wisconsin-Whitewater	2^{10}

Semifinals
**Case-Western**	**7**
St. Thomas (MN)	3
**Wisconsin-Stevens Point**	**8**
St. Scholastica	2

Final
Case-Western	0	–
**Wisconsin-Stevens Point**	**1**	–

=== Mid-Atlantic Regional ===
PNC Field-Moosic, PA (Host: Misericordia University)

First round/elimination round 1	Second round/elimination round 2	Semifinals/elimination semifinals	Finals
4	**Alvernia**	**10**
5	Johns Hopkins	5
Alvernia	2
**Kean**	**5**
1	**Kean**	**12**
8	Penn State-Harrisburg	7
**Kean**	**4**
Keystone	2
3	Misericordia	0
6	**Ramapo**	**4**
Ramapo	2
**Keystone**	**4**
2	**Keystone**	**8**
7	Franklin & Marshall	0	**Kean**	0	**6**
Keystone	**2**	1
Lower round 1	Lower round 2	Lower round 3	Lower final
**Ramapo**	**3**
**Johns Hopkins**	**15**	Johns Hopkins	1	**Keystone**	**6**
Penn State-Harrisburg	2	Ramapo	1	Misericordia	5^{11}
**Misericordia**	**2**
Alvernia	0
**Misericordia**	**7**	**Misericordia**	**6**
Franklin & Marshall	5

=== Central Regional ===
Brunner Field in the Duane R. Swanson Stadium-Moline, IL (Host: Augustana College (Illinois))

First round
1	**Webster**	**7**
6	Ripon	6
2	Wartburg	4
5	**Adrian**	**5**^{12}
3	Augustana	0
4	**Concordia-Chicago**	**2**

Second round/elimination round 1
Webster	3
**Augustana**	**5**
Ripon	0
**Wartburg**	**10**
Adrian	2
**Concordia-Chicago**	3
**Webster**	**11**
Adrian	3

Third round/elimination round 2
**Augustana**	**9**
Wartburg	3
Concordia-Chicago	2
**Webster**	**8**

Elimination final
Augustana	6
**Concordia-Chicago**	**9**

Final
Concordia-Chicago	3
**Webster**	**7**

== World Series ==
Time Warner Cable Field at Fox Cities Stadium-Grand Chute, WI (Host: University of Wisconsin-Oshkosh/Lawrence University/Fox Cities Convention and Visitors Bureau)

Upper round 1
NE1	Southern Maine	2
S3	Millsaps	1^{10}
W1	Linfield	8
NY1	Ithaca	6
ME1	Manchester	5
MW2	Wisconsin-Stevens Point	6^{10}
MA1	Kean	14
C1	Webster	8

Upper round 2
Southern Maine	1
Linfield	10
Wisconsin-Stevens Point	4
Kean	3
Lower round 1
Millsaps	2
Ithaca	5
Manchester	3
Webster	5

Upper final
Linfield	5
Wisconsin-Stevens Point	3
Lower round 2
Kean	1
Ithaca	3
Southern Maine	7
Webster	2

Semifinals
Linfield	4
Ithaca	6
Wisconsin-Stevens Point	1
Southern Maine	8

Preliminary final
Ithaca	4
Southern Maine	5^{13}

Final
Linfield	4
Southern Maine	1

== See also ==
- 2013 NCAA Division I baseball tournament
- 2013 NCAA Division II baseball tournament
- 2013 NAIA World Series
