= Dupont Park =

Coordinates: 38.8732°N 76.9629°W

- Neighborhood of Washington, D.C.
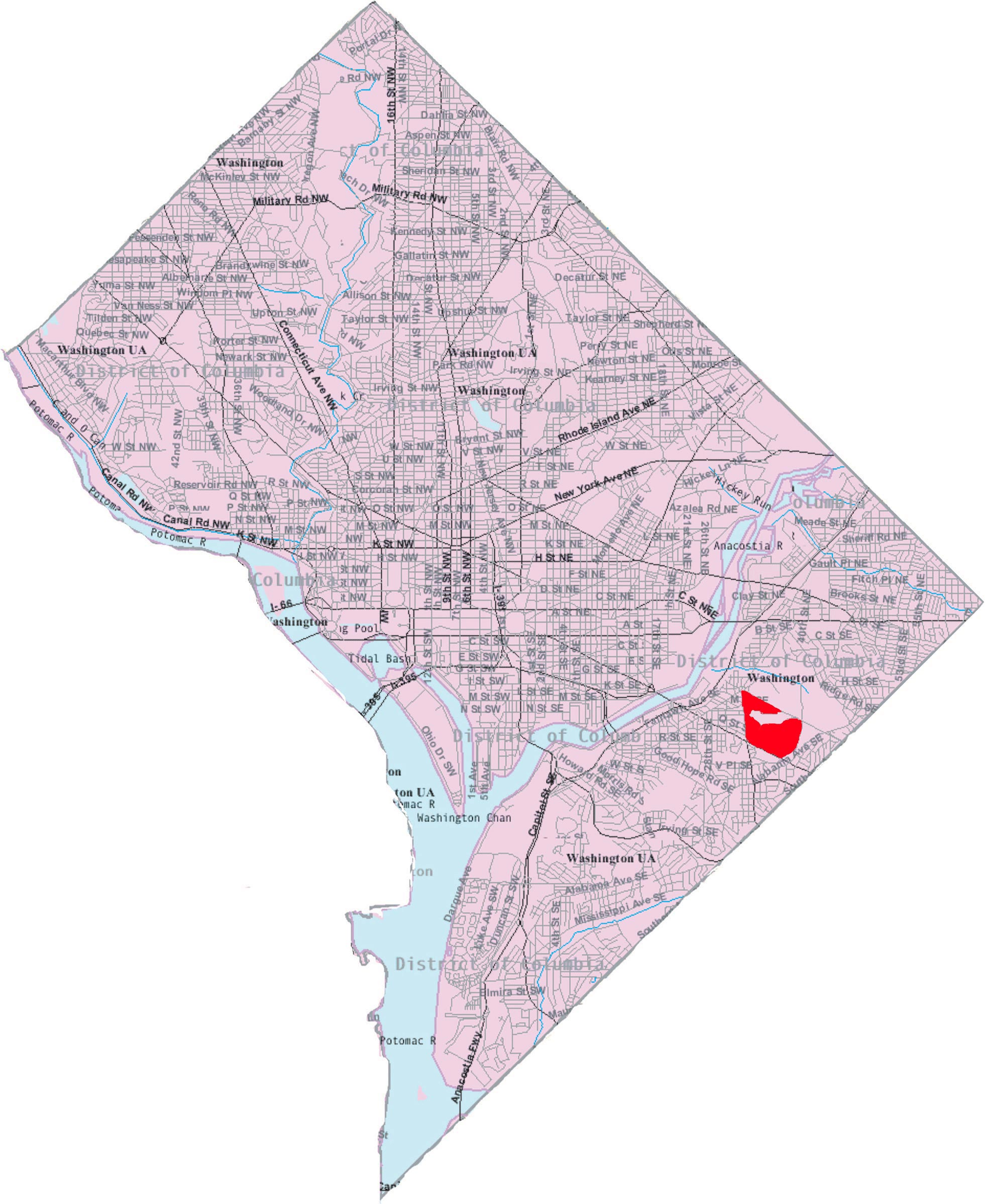
- Dupont Park within the District of Columbia
- Country: United States
- District: Washington, D.C.
- Ward: Ward 7

Government
  - Councilmember: Wendell Felder

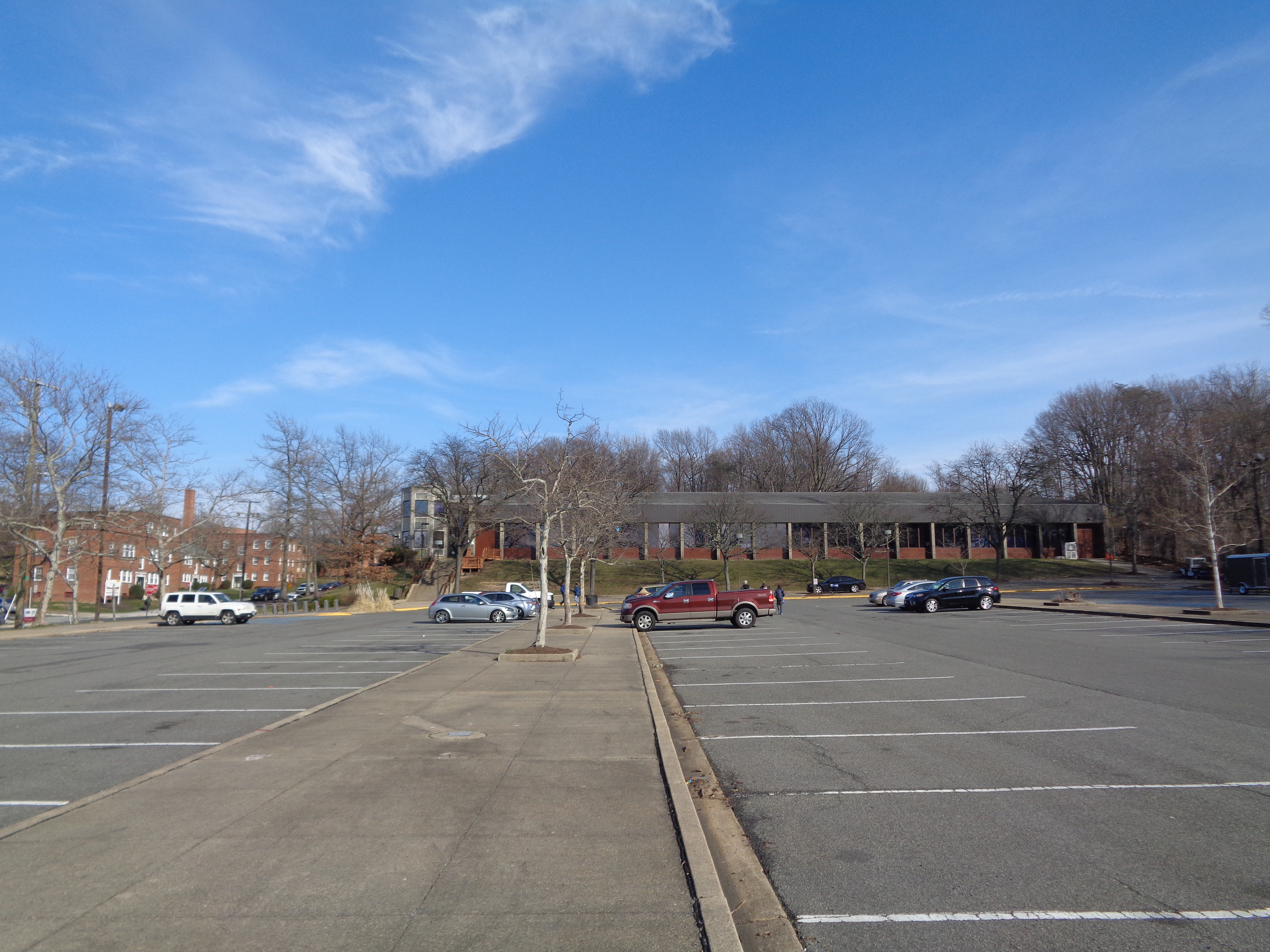
Fort Dupont Park Ice Rink, before the recent modernization project

Dupont Park is a residential neighborhood located in southeast Washington, D.C. It is bounded by Fort Dupont Park to the north, Pennsylvania Avenue SE to the south, Branch Avenue to the west, and Fort Davis Park to the east. The neighborhood civic association uses Fairlawn Avenue and the Anacostia Freeway as the western boundary of the neighborhood.

Dupont Park is nestled into the parkland of Fort Davis and Fort Dupont Parks, the grounds of two Civil War-era forts that were constructed for the defense of Washington. The year-round Fort Dupont Ice Arena used for ice-skating and hockey is also located in this area.

Dupont Park is a distinct neighborhood from the nearby Fort Dupont, although both border the park and take their name from it. Neither should Dupont Park be confused with Dupont Circle, a more commercial neighborhood in the Northwest quadrant.
