= Irwin Field =

Ballpark in Tyler, Texas, US

Coordinates: 32.31313°N 95.25647°W

Irwin Field is a ballpark in Tyler, Texas, and home to the UT Tyler Patriots baseball team of the American Southwest Conference. The venue holds a capacity of 1,000.

The ballpark was named after local philanthropists Robert B. and Mary Irwin.

== See also ==
- Fair Park (Tyler, Texas)
- Mike Carter Field
