= 2011 NCAA Division III baseball tournament =

- Season: 2011
- Teams: 55
- Finals site: Time Warner Cable Field at Fox Cities Stadium; Grand Chute, Wisconsin
- Champions: Marietta (5th title)
- Runner-up: Chapman

The 2011 NCAA Division III baseball tournament was played at the end of the 2011 NCAA Division III baseball season to determine the 36th national champion of college baseball at the NCAA Division III level. The tournament concluded with eight teams competing at Time Warner Cable Field at Fox Cities Stadium in Grand Chute, Wisconsin for the championship. Eight regional tournaments were held to determine the participants in the World Series. Regional tournaments were contested in double-elimination format, with four regions consisting of six teams, one consisting of seven, and three consisting of eight, for a total of 55 teams participating in the tournament. The tournament champion was Marietta, who defeated Chapman for the championship.

== Bids ==
The 55 competing teams were:

== Regionals ==
Bold indicates winner.

=== West Regional ===
Walt Driggers Field-Abilene, TX (Host: McMurry University)

First round
1	Linfield	2
6	**Concordia (TX)**	**5**
2	**Chapman**	**7**
5	Texas-Tyler	0
3	**Redlands**	**3**
4	Trinity (TX)	2

Second round/elimination round 1
Concordia (TX)	5
**Trinity (TX)**	**7**
**Linfield**	**6**
Texas-Tyler	3
**Chapman**	**8**
Redlands	4
**Concordia (TX)**	**12**
Redlands	6

Semifinals
Trinity (TX)	6
**Linfield**	**9**
**Chapman**	**9**
Concordia (TX)	3

Final
Linfield	7	–
**Chapman**	**8**	–

=== Mid-Atlantic Regional ===
FirstEnergy Park-Lakewood, NJ (Host: Kean University)

First round/elimination round 1	Second round/elimination round 2	Semifinals/elimination semifinals	Finals
4	**Misericordia**	**3**
5	Messiah	1
**Misericordia**	**4**
Catholic	0
1	Kean	2
8	**Catholic**	**3**
Misericordia	1
**Alvernia**	**3**
3	**Alvernia**	**2**
6	Johns Hopkins	1
**Alvernia**	**11**
Rowan	4
2	**Rowan**	**8**
7	Randolph-Macon	5	Alvernia	4	0
**Kean**	**9**	**7**
Lower round 1	Lower round 2	Lower round 3	Lower final
Rowan	3
Messiah	0	**Kean**	**4**	Misericordia	3
**Kean**	**6**	**Kean**	**6**	**Kean**	**5**
Johns Hopkins	5
Catholic	2
**Johns Hopkins**	**8**	**Johns Hopkins**	**7**
Randolph-Macon	5

=== Mideast Regional ===
Don Schaly Stadium-Marietta, OH (Host: Marietta College)

Upper round 1	Upper round 2	Upper final	Final
4	**Franklin**	**3**
5	Frostburg State	2
Franklin	0
**Marietta**	**6**
1	**Marietta**	**7**
Frostburg State	2
**Marietta**	**23**
Heidelberg	6
3	Adrian	4
6	**Case Western**	**5**
Case Western	1
**Heidelberg**	**10**
2	**Heidelberg**	**12**
7	Penn State-Altoona	5	**Marietta**	**2**	--
Heidelberg	1	--
Lower round 1	Lower round 2	Lower round 3	Lower final
**Heidelberg**	**16**
Franklin	4	Case Western	6
**Case Western**	**10**
**Case Western**	**12**
Adrian	2	Penn State-Altoona	6
**Penn State-Altoona**	**3**

=== South Regional ===
USA Stadium-Millington, TN (Host: Rhodes College)

First round
1	Christopher Newport	1
6	**Webster**	**11**
2	**Shenandoah**	**4**
5	Wabash	0
3	**Piedmont**	**10**
4	Salisbury	1

Second round/elimination round 1
Webster	1
**Salisbury**	**10**
Christopher Newport	3
**Wabash**	**9**
**Shenandoah**	**14**
Piedmont	5
Webster	1
**Piedmont**	**2**

Semifinals
**Salisbury**	**7**
Wabash	5
**Shenandoah**	**6**
Piedmont	1

Final
**Salisbury**	**9**	**8**
Shenandoah	8	7

=== Central Regional ===
Jack Horenberger Field-Bloomington, IL (Host: Illinois Wesleyan University)

First round
1	Coe	2
6	**Ripon**	**3**
2	Carthage	1
5	**Buena Vista**	**8**
3	Thomas More	2
4	**Illinois Wesleyan**	**3**

Second round/elimination round 1
Ripon	3
**Thomas More**	**5**
Coe	3
**Carthage**	**5**
**Buena Vista**	**7**
Illinois Wesleyan	1
Ripon	1
**Illinois Wesleyan**	**2**

Semifinals
Thomas More	4
**Carthage**	**10**
**Buena Vista**	**7**
Illinois Wesleyan	6

Final
Carthage	**12**	6
**Buena Vista**	7	**7**

=== Midwest Regional ===
Prucha Field at James B. Miller Stadium-Whitewater, WI (Host: University of Wisconsin-Whitewater)

First round
1	**Wisconsin-Stevens Point**	**3**
6	Aurora	2^{10}
2	**Wisconsin-Whitewater**	**3**
5	St. Thomas (MN)	2
3	St. Scholastica	2
4	**Hamline**	**3**^{13}

Second round/elimination round 1
Wisconsin-Stevens Point	2
**St. Scholastica**	**3**
Aurora	3
**St. Thomas (MN)**	**8**
**Wisconsin-Whitewater**	**7**
Hamline	6^{10}
**Wisconsin-Stevens Point**	**5**
Hamline	1

Semifinals
**St. Scholastica**	**2**
St. Thomas (MN)	1
**Wisconsin-Whitewater**	**2**
Wisconsin-Stevens Point	1

Final
St. Scholastica	3	–
**Wisconsin-Whitewater**	**6**	–

=== New York Regional ===
Leo Pinckney Field at Falcon Park-Auburn, NY (Host: State University of New York at Cortland)

First round/elimination round 1	Second round/elimination round 2	Semifinals/elimination semifinals	Finals
4	Brockport	0
5	**Eastern Connecticut State**	**2**
Eastern Connecticut State	7
**SUNY Cortland**	**8**
1	**SUNY Cortland**	**3**
8	Mitchell	1
SUNY Cortland	0
**Keystone**	**13**
3	**Keystone**	**8**
6	Ramapo	5
**Keystone**	**6**
Farmingdale State	2
2	**Farmingdale State**	**2**
7	Clarkson	1^{10}	**Keystone**	**5**	--
SUNY Cortland	4	--
Lower round 1	Lower round 2	Lower round 3	Lower final
Farmingdale State	2
**Brockport**	**10**	**Brockport**	**6**	**SUNY Cortland**	**9**
Mitchell	0	**Brockport**	**6**	Brockport	4
Eastern Connecticut State	3
**Eastern Connecticut State**	**6**
Ramapo	2	Brockport	1
**Clarkson**	**5**

=== New England Regional ===
Whitehouse Field-Harwich, MA (Host: Eastern College Athletic Conference)

First round/elimination round 1	Second round/elimination round 2	Semifinals/elimination semifinals	Finals
4	MIT	2
5	**Rhode Island College**	**12**
Rhode Island College	5
**Bridgewater College**	**8**
1	Tufts	0
8	**Bridgewater State**	**8**
Bridgewater State	4
**Western New England**	**11**
3	Wheaton (MA)	2
6	**St. Joseph's (ME)**	**4**
St. Joseph's (ME)	1
**Western New England**	**4**
2	**Western New England**	**2**
7	Husson	0	**Western New England**	**9**	--
Bridgewater State	0	--
Lower round 1	Lower round 2	Lower round 3	Lower final
**St. Joseph's (ME)**	**4**
MIT	2	Tufts	3^{11}	**Bridgewater State**	**6**
**Tufts**	**3**	St. Joseph's (ME)	3	Wheaton (MA)	3
**Wheaton (MA)**	**5**
Rhode Island College	6
**Wheaton (MA)**	**8**	**Wheaton (MA)**	**10**
Husson	4

== World Series ==
Time Warner Cable Field at Fox Cities Stadium-Grand Chute, WI (Host: University of Wisconsin-Oshkosh/Lawrence University/Fox Cities Convention and Visitors Bureau)

Upper round 1
W2	Chapman	9
MA1	Kean	4
ME1	Marietta	8
S4	Salisbury	0
C5	Buena Vista	5
MW2	Wisconsin-Whitewater	4
NY3	Keystone	2
NE2	Western New England	1

Upper round 2
Chapman	4
Marietta	9
Buena Vista	8
Keystone	5
Lower round 1
Kean	3
Salisbury	10
Wisconsin-Whitewater	8
Western New England	3

Upper final
Marietta	5
Buena Vista	1
Lower round 2
Keystone	7
Salisbury	2
Chapman	4
Wisconsin-Whitewater	2

Semifinals
Marietta	11
Keystone	2
Buena Vista	2
Chapman	3

Final
Marietta	4	18
Chapman	15	5
