= UT Tyler Patriots =

College athletic teams

- University: University of Texas at Tyler
- Conference: LSC (primary)
- NCAA: Division II
- Athletic director: Dr. Sam Ferguson
- Location: Tyler, Texas
- Varsity teams: 17 (7 men's, 9 women's, 1 co-ed)
- Basketball arena: Louise Herrington Patriot Center
- Baseball stadium: Irwin Field
- Softball stadium: UT Tyler Softball Field
- Soccer stadium: Citizens 1st Bank-Perkins Soccer Complex
- Tennis venue: Summers Tennis Center
- Nickname: Patriots
- Colors: Orange and Navy
- Website: uttylerpatriots.com
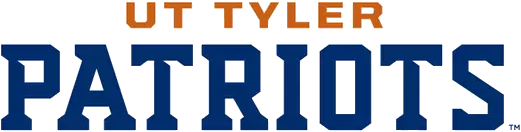

The UT Tyler Patriots are the athletic teams that represent the University of Texas at Tyler, located in Tyler, Texas, in NCAA Division II intercollegiate sports.

The Patriots are full members of the Lone Star Conference, which is home to all sixteen athletic programs.

== History ==
As of July 2017, the school was considering a move to Division II as a part of a strategy to be a more significant player in the region, possibly building a new athletic campus in the process.

On February 2, 2018, the school formally applied for Division II status; if approved, full membership would begin on September 1, 2021. No conference affiliation was initially announced. After the NCAA approved UT Tyler to begin the transition process, UT Tyler would be announced as a new member of the Lone Star Conference effective with the 2019–20 school year.

== Varsity teams ==
Men's sports	Women's sports
Baseball	Basketball
Basketball	Cross country
Cross country	Golf
Golf	Lacrosse
Soccer	Soccer
Tennis	Softball
Track and field	Tennis
	Track and field
	Volleyball

== National championships ==
=== Team ===
Sport	Association	Division	Year	Opponent/Runner-up	Score/Points
Baseball (1)	NCAA	Division III	2018	Texas Lutheran	2–0 (8–1, 9–6)
Softball (3)	NCAA	Division III (1)	2016	Messiah	7–0
Softball (3)	NCAA	Division II (2)	2024	Western Washington	10–1
Softball (3)	NCAA	Division II (2)	2025	Tampa	2–0
Men's tennis (2)	NAIA	Single	1989	Auburn Montgomery	35–24
Men's tennis (2)	NAIA	Single	1994	Oklahoma City	39–32

== Notable athletes ==
- Brittany Mahomes, played professionally for UMF Afturelding, co-owner of Kansas City Current
