= Neuroscience Group Field at Fox Cities Stadium =

Baseball stadium in Grand Chute, Wisconsin

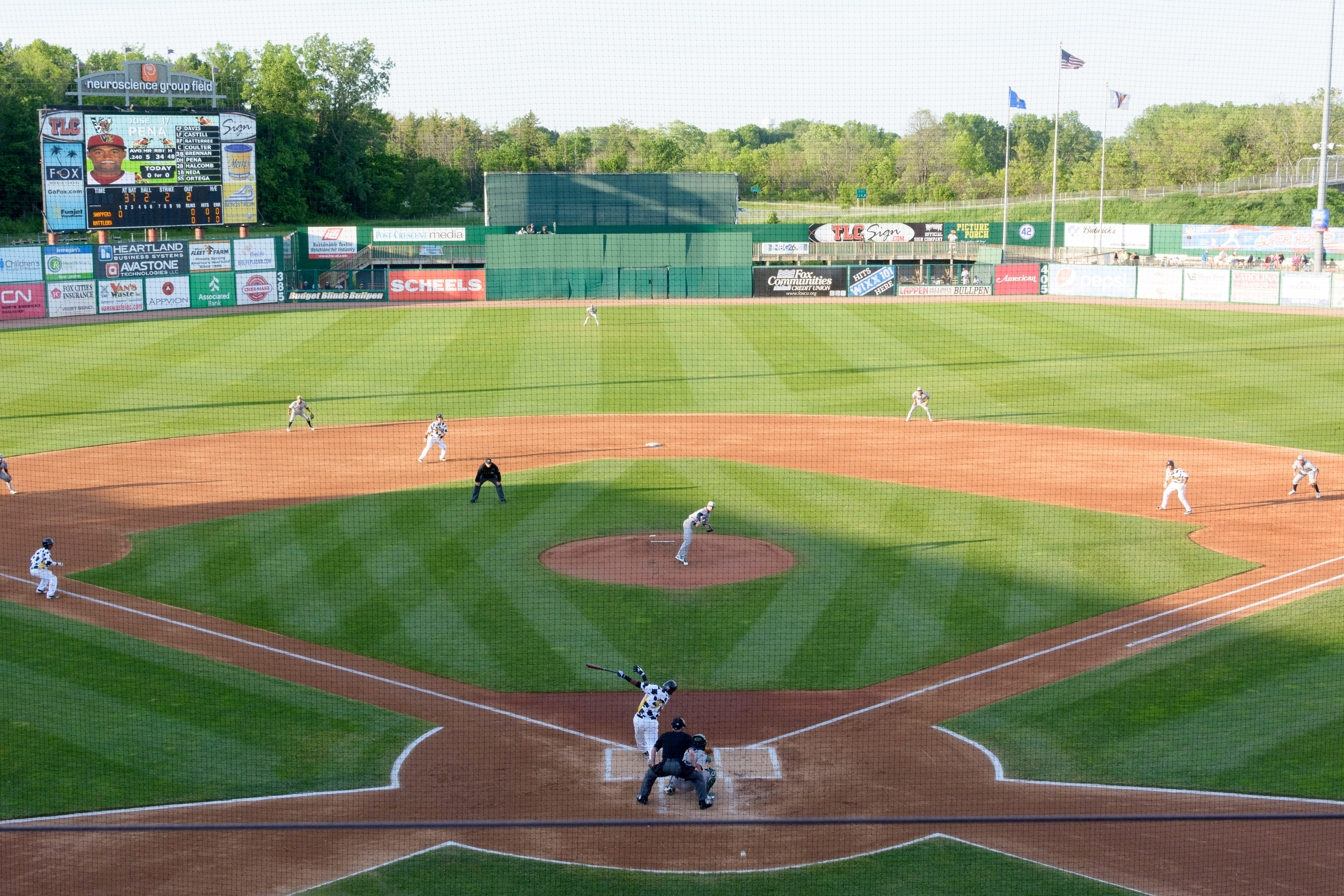
- Neuroscience Group Field in 2014

- Location within Wisconsin Location within the United States
- Interactive map of Neuroscience Group Field at Fox Cities Stadium
- Former names: Fox Cities Stadium (1995–2007); Time Warner Cable Field at Fox Cities Stadium (2007–2013)
- Address: 2400 North Casaloma Drive; Appleton, Wisconsin (Note: While the stadium has an Appleton mailing address, it is within the town limits of Grand Chute.); United States
- Coordinates: 44.283524°N 88.468742°W
- Owner: Diamond Baseball Holdings
- Operator: Diamond Baseball Holdings
- Capacity: 5,900 (2013–present); 5,500 (1995–2012)
- Surface: Grass
- Field size: Left field: 325 ft (99 m); Center field: 400 ft (122 m); Right field: 325 ft (99 m)

Construction
- Groundbreaking: August 17, 1994
- Opened: April 6, 1995
- Renovated: 2012–2013; 2022–2023
- Cost: $5.5 million ($11.6 million in 2025 dollars)
- Architect: HNTB
- General contractor: Oscar J. Boldt Construction

Tenant
- Wisconsin Timber Rattlers (MWL) 1995–present

Website
- www.milb.com/wisconsin/ballpark/fox-cities-stadium

Neuroscience Group Field at Fox Cities Stadium is a baseball stadium located in Grand Chute, Wisconsin, a suburb of Appleton. The stadium was built in 1995, and holds 5,900 people. It is primarily used for baseball as the home field of the Wisconsin Timber Rattlers, the Midwest League affiliate of the Milwaukee Brewers. The stadium also hosts a few concerts each year.

Since 1998, it has served as the site of the Wisconsin Interscholastic Athletic Association state baseball championships. From 2000 until 2018, it hosted the NCAA Division III College World Series; the contract to host the event ran out in 2018 and the stadium chose to not renew the contract due to the expanded D-III playoffs schedule conflicting with the Timber Rattlers' schedule.

== History ==
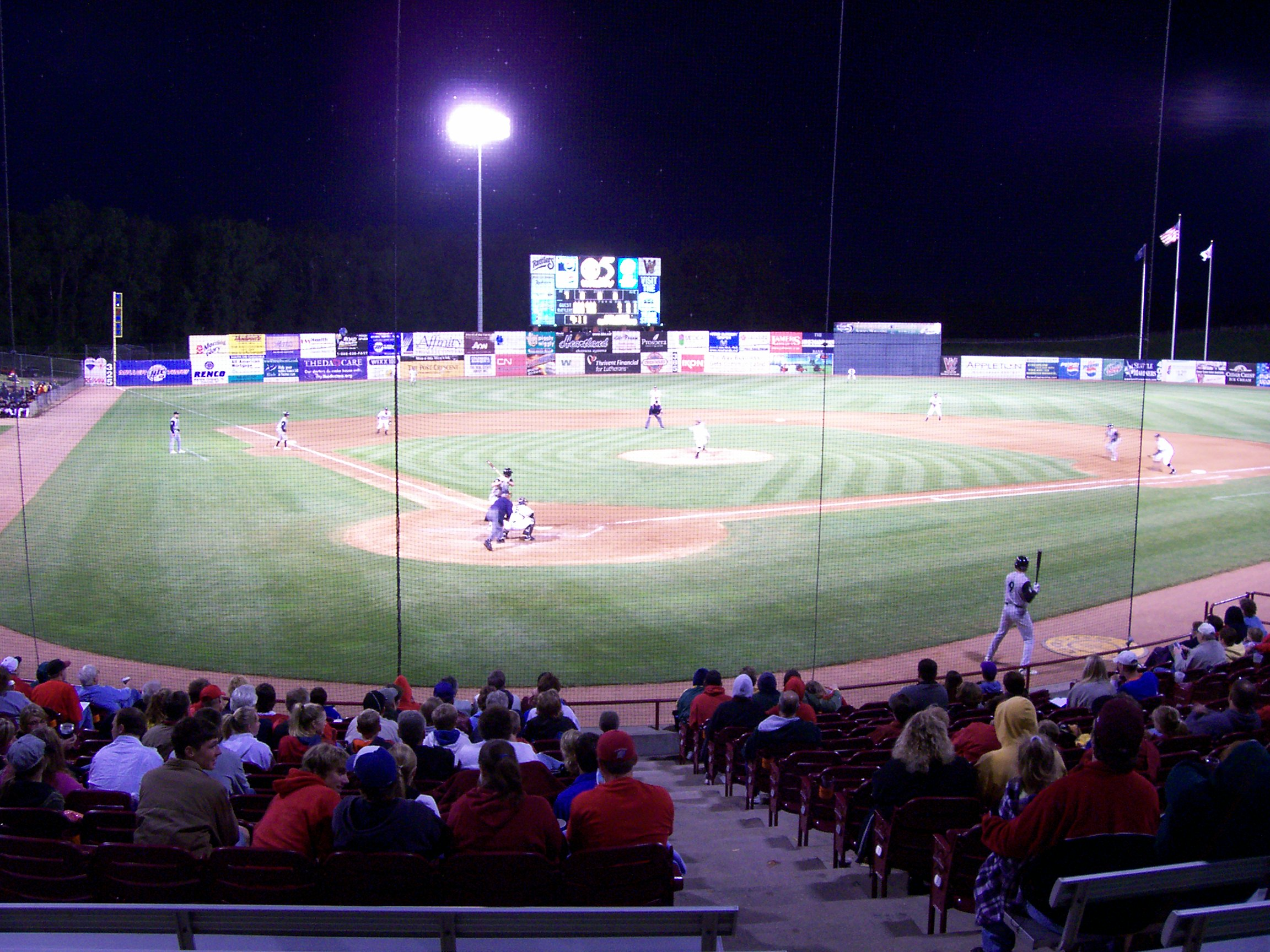
Inside Fox Cities Stadium (June 9, 2006)

On March 9, 2007, Time Warner Cable, the area's cable provider before its 2017 merger with Charter Communications (and then-broadcast partner of the team through its local cable sports channel), signed a 10-year naming rights deal. In December 2013 Time Warner opted out of the final three years of the deal. In January 2014, Neuroscience Group, a local neurology practice, reached a 10-year deal for naming rights.

Following the cancelled 2020 minor league season, Appleton Baseball Club, Inc, sold the Timber Rattlers to Third Base Ventures, LLC, a group consisting of principal owner Craig Dickman and minority owners team president Rob Zerjav and Brad Raaths. The group also purchased the team's ballpark from the Fox Cities Amateur Sports Authority with plans to keep the team in Grand Chute.

In April 2025, Third Base Ventures sold the Timber Rattlers and the stadium to Diamond Baseball Holdings, a sports management company that owns over a third of minor league teams.

=== Renovations ===
In November 2012, the stadium began a major renovation that was completed in 2013. This allowed for functions such as weddings or large meetings on a year-round basis. Further renovations were announced in September 2022 with completion coming before the 2023 season. The renovations aimed to meet the new standards for minor league stadiums announced in 2021.
