= 2022 NCAA Division III baseball tournament =

College baseball tournament

- Season: 2022
- Teams: 60
- Finals site: Veterans Memorial Stadium; Cedar Rapids, Iowa
- Champions: Eastern Conn St. (5th title)
- Runner-up: Salisbury
- Winning coach: Brian Hamm (1st title)

The 2022 NCAA Division III baseball tournament was the 46th edition of the NCAA Division III baseball tournament. The 60-team tournament began on Friday, May 20 as part of the 2022 NCAA Division III baseball season and concluded with the 2022 Division III College World Series in Cedar Rapids, Iowa, which started on June 3 and ended on June 9. Eastern Connecticut State came won the final game of the tournament to win their 5th national championship.

The 60 participating NCAA Division III college baseball teams were selected out of an eligible 389 teams. There were 41 teams awarded an automatic bid as champions of their conferences, 1 team selected who could not earn an automatic bid, and 18 teams selected at-large by the NCAA Division III Baseball Committee. Teams were divided into fourteen regionals of four teams, each of which conducted a double-elimination tournament, and two regionals of two teams, each of which conducted a best-of-five series. Regional champions then faced each other in Super Regionals, a best-of-three game series, determined the eight participants in the College World Series.

== Tournament procedure ==
A total of 60 teams entered the tournament, with 41 of them receiving an automatic bid by winning their conference's tournament. 1 bid was reserved for teams who cannot earn an automatic bid, while the remaining 18 bids were "at-large", with selections extended by the NCAA Selection Committee.

== Schedule and venues ==
On May 16, the NCAA Division III Baseball Committee announced the sixteen regional host sites.

Regionals

- May 20–22
  - TBD

Super Regionals

- May 27–28
  - TBD

College World Series

- June 3–9
  - Veterans Memorial Stadium, Cedar Rapids, Iowa (Host: American Rivers Conference)

== Bids ==
=== Automatic bids ===
School	Conference	Record (Conf)	Berth	Last NCAA Appearance
Mount Aloysius	AMCC	27–13 (11–5)	Tournament	
Coe	ARC	21–19 (12–12)	Tournament	2019 (Birmingham Super Regional)
Texas–Dallas	ASC	34–14 (20–10)	Tournament	2021 (Collegeville Regional)
Immaculata	AEC	28–12 (14–4)	Tournament	First appearance
Swarthmore	Centennial	22–17 (14–4)	Tournament	1985 (Mid-Atlantic Regional)
Augustana	CCIW	33–10 (11–7)	Tournament	2016 (Central Regional)
Keystone	CSAC	24–18 (10–2)	Tournament	
Endicott	CCC	32–7 (14–2)	Tournament	
St. John Fisher	E8	26–13 (18–2)	Tournament	2021 (Marietta Regional)
Johnson & Wales	GNAC	13–24 (11–7)	Tournament	
Earlham	HCAC	26–11 (12–6)	Tournament	
Elizabethtown	Landmark	22–20 (11–7)	Tournament	
Ithaca	Liberty	30–12 (15–5)	Tournament	2019 (Union Regional)
Eastern Connecticut State	LEC		Tournament	
Bridgewater State	MASCAC		Tournament	
Kalamazoo	MIAA		Tournament	
Lebanon Valley	MAC Commonwealth		Tournament	
Arcadia	MAC Freedom		Tournament	
Lawrence	Midwest		Tournament	
Bethel	MIAC		Tournament	
Mitchell	NECC		Tournament	
Middlebury	NESCAC		Tournament	
Wheaton (MA)	NEWMAC	30–10 (14–3)	Tournament	2021 College World Series
William Paterson	NJAC		Tournament	
Husson	NAC		Tournament	
Denison	NCAC		Tournament	
MSOE	NACC		Tournament	
Pacific	NWC	28–16 (14–10)	Tournament	2021 (Collegeville Regional)
Marietta	OAC		Tournament	
Shenandoah	ODAC		Tournament	
Washington & Jefferson	PAC		Tournament	
St. Joseph's (L.I.)	Skyline		Tournament	
Birmingham–Southern	SAA		Tournament	
Cal Lutheran	SCIAC		Tournament	
Centenary	SCAC		Tournament	
Cortland	SUNYAC		Tournament	
Webster	SLIAC		Tournament	
Penn State–Harrisburg	United East		Tournament	
Crown (MN)	UMAC		Tournament	
LaGrange	USA South		Tournament	
Wisconsin–Stevens Point	WIAC		Tournament	

=== By conference ===
Conference	Total	Schools
NWC	1	Pacific
AMCC		
ARC		
ASC		
AEC		
Centennial		
CCIW		
CSAC		
CCC		
E8		St. John Fisher
GNAC		
HCAC		
Landmark		
Liberty		Ithaca
LEC		
MASCAC		
MIAA		
MAC Commonwealth		
MAC Freedom		
Midwest		
MIAC		
NECC		
NESCAC		
NEWMAC		Wheaton
NJAC		William Paterson, Montclair State, Rowan
NAC		
NCAC		
NACC		
OAC		
ODAC		
PAC		
Skyline		
SAA		
SCIAC		
SCAC		
SUNYAC		
SLIAC		
United East		
UMAC		
USA South		
WIAC		

== Regionals and Super Regionals ==
Bold indicates winner. Seeds for regional tournaments indicate seeds within regional. Seeds for super regional tournaments indicate national seeds only.

=== Birmingham Super Regional ===
Regional	Regional
1	**Birmingham-So.**	**10**
4	Earlham	2
1	**Birmingham-So.**	**10**
2	Lynchburg	2
3	Salve Regina	3
2	**Lynchburg**	**7**
Lynchburg Regional – Fox Field
4	Earlham	6
3	**Salve Regina**	**7**	3	**Salve Regina**	**6**
2	Lynchburg	3

Regional Final
**Trinity (TX)**	**7**	**18**	9	**21**	–
Texas-Dallas	4	13	**32**	13	–
Richardson Regional – UTD Baseball Field
1	**Birmingham-So.**	**10**
3	Salve Regina	2

Super Regional
**Trinity (TX)**	**9**	**14**	–
Birmingham-So.	8	8	–

=== Willimantic Super Regional ===
Regional	Regional
1	**Eastern Conn St.**	**10**
4	Swarthmore	7
1	**Eastern Conn St.**	**17**
3	Middlebury	4
3	**Middlebury**	**10**
2	Rochester	5
Rochester Regional – Towers Field
4	**Swarthmore**	**17**
2	Rochester	14
4	Swarthmore	4
3	**Middlebury**	**8**
1	**Rowan**	**7**
4	Mitchell	1
1	**Rowan**	**14**
2	Wash. & Jeff.	7
3	Lebanon Valley	1
2	**Wash. & Jeff.**	**5**
Annville Regional – McGill Field
4	**Mitchell**	**10**
3	Lebanon Valley	8
4	Mitchell	6
2	**Wash. & Jeff.**	**13**

Regional Final
1	**Eastern Conn St.**	**5**	–
3	Middlebury	4	–
1	**Rowan**	**9**	–
2	Wash. & Jeff.	0	–

Super Regional
**Eastern Conn St.**	**6**	**7**	–
Rowan	1	6	–

=== Beverly Super Regional ===
Regional	Regional
1	**SUNY Cortland**	**4**
4	Bridgewater St.	3
1	**SUNY Cortland**	**10**
2	Endicott	7
3	St. John Fisher	1
2	**Endicott**	**10**
Cortland Regional – Robert H. Wallace Field
4	Bridgewater St.	4
3	**St. John Fisher**	**5**
3	St. John Fisher	8
2	**Endicott**	**18**
1	Wheaton (MA)	3
4	**JWU (Providence)**	**6**
4	JWU (Providence)	4
2	**Baldwin Wallace**	**13**
3	SUNY Brockport	3
2	**Baldwin Wallace**	**4**
Brockport Regional – Clark V. Whited Complex
1	**Wheaton (MA)**	**6**
3	SUNY Brockport	2
1	**Wheaton (MA)**	**9**
4	JWU (Providence)	3

Regional Final
1	SUNY Cortland	3	5
2	**Endicott**	**16**	**7**
2	**Baldwin Wallace**	**11**	–
1	Wheaton (MA)	6	–

Super Regional
Endicott	2	4	–
**Baldwin Wallace**	**4**	**7**	–

=== Ithaca Super Regional ===
Regional	Regional
1	Immaculata	5
4	**Keystone**	**7**
4	Keystone	2
3	**Ithaca**	**7**
3	**Ithaca**	**8**
2	Montclair St.	5
Immaculata Regional – Baseball Stadium
1	**Immaculata**	**5**
2	Montclair St.	5
1	Immaculata	5
4	**Keystone**	**6**
1	**Shenandoah**	**10**
4	St. Joseph's (L.I.)	3
1	Shenandoah	5
2	**Catholic**	**6**
3	Stevens	1
2	**Catholic**	**7**
Winchester Regional – Bridgeforth Field
4	**St. Joseph's (L.I.)**	**2**
3	Stevens	0
4	St. Joseph's (L.I.)	8
1	**Shenandoah**	**10**

Regional Final
3	**Ithaca**	**17**	–
4	Keystone	2	–
2	**Catholic**	**13**	–
1	Shenandoah	10	–

Super Regional
Ithaca	**4**	4	2
**Catholic**	0	**7**	**16**

=== LaGrange Super Regional ===
Regional	Regional
1	**Chapman**	**3**
4	Pacific (OR)	1
1	**Chapman**	**3**
2	Pomona-Pitzer	1
3	Cal Lutheran	6
2	**Pomona-Pitzer**	**14**
Orange Regional – Hart Park
4	Pacific (OR)	1
3	**Cal Lutheran**	**9**	3	Cal Lutheran	5
2	**Pomona-Pitzer**	**7**

Regional Final
**LaGrange**	**7**	**9**	**14**	–	–
Centenary (LA)	3	7	9	–	–
LaGrange Regional – Cleaveland Field
1	**Chapman**	8
2	Pomona-Pitzer	**17**

Super Regional
**LaGrange**	**7**	8	**4**
Chapman	6	**9**	2

=== Marietta Super Regional ===
Regional	Regional
1	**Arcadia**	**10**
4	Husson	5
1	**Arcadia**	**10**
2	Oswego St.	7
3	Elizabethtown	2
2	**Oswego St.**	**8**
Glenside Regional – Skip Wilson Field
4	**Husson**	**13**
3	Elizabethtown	12
4	Husson	10
2	**Oswego St.**	**12**
1	**Marietta**	**9**
4	Kalamazoo	7
1	**Marietta**	**14**
2	Chris. Newport	5
3	Mount Aloysius	3
2	**Chris. Newport**	**4**
Marietta Regional – Don and Sue Schaly Field at Pioneer Park
4	**Kalamazoo**	**8**
3	Mount Aloysius	7
4	Kalamazoo	5
2	**Chris. Newport**	**11**

Regional Final
1	Arcadia	4	1
2	**Oswego St.**	**11**	**4**
1	**Marietta**	**7**	–
2	Chris. Newport	2	–

Super Regional
Oswego St.	2	5	–
**Marietta**	**13**	**19**	–

=== Salisbury Super Regional ===
Regional	Regional
1	**Denison**	**14**
4	Penn St. Harrisburg	6
1	**Denison**	**2**
2	Salisbury	0
3	Wm. Paterson	1
2	**Salisbury**	**10**
Granville Regional – Big Red Field
4	Penn St. Harrisburg	8
3	**Wm. Paterson**	**15**
3	Wm. Paterson	3
2	**Salisbury**	**17**
1	**Webster**	**9**
4	Crown (MN)	7
1	Webster	5
3	**Bethel (MN)**	**7**
3	**Bethel (MN)**	**12**
2	Wooster	7
St. Louis Regional – Lloyd Hopkins Field
4	Crown (MN)	3
2	**Wooster**	**21**
2	**Wooster**	**4**
1	Webster	3

Regional Final
1	Denison	2	1
2	**Salisbury**	**4**	**3**
3	Bethel (MN)	8	6
2	**Wooster**	**11**	**11**

Super Regional
**Salisbury**	**8**	4	**18**
Wooster	6	**6**	16

=== Whitewater Super Regional ===
Regional	Regional
1	**Wis.-Whitewater**	**10**
4	MSOE	6
1	**Wis.-Whitewater**	**8**
2	Aurora	4
3	Augustana (IL)	7
2	**Aurora**	**8**
Whitewater Regional – Prucha Field
4	MSOE	3
3	**Augustana (IL)**	**5**
3	Augustana (IL)	1
2	**Aurora**	**10**
1	**Wis.-Stevens Point**	**11**
4	Lawrence	6
1	Wis.-Stevens Point	2
2	**North Central (IL)**	**8**
3	Coe	8
2	**North Central (IL)**	**12**
Stevens Point Regional – Zimmermann Field
4	Lawrence	1
3	**Coe**	**6**
3	Coe	5
1	**Wis.-Stevens Point**	**10**

Regional Final
1	**Wis.-Whitewater**	8	**12**
2	Aurora	**13**	8
2	North Central (IL)	3	8
1	**Wis.-Stevens Point**	**27**	**21**

Super Regional
Wis.-Whitewater	9	7	–
**Wis.-Stevens Point**	**10**	**11**	–

== College World Series ==
The College World Series was held at Veterans Memorial Stadium in Cedar Rapids, Iowa.

=== Bracket ===
First round	Second round
1	Marietta	7
8	Catholic	0
1	Marietta	5
4	Salisbury	7
4	Salisbury	8
5	Wis.-Stevens Point	2
Bracket 1
8	Catholic	8
5	Wis.-Stevens Point	12
1	Marietta	4
5	Wis.-Stevens Point	6
2	Eastern Conn St.	10
7	Baldwin Wallace	3
2	Eastern Conn St.	4
3	LaGrange	3
3	LaGrange	12
6	Trinity (TX)	0
Bracket 2
7	Baldwin Wallace	5
6	Trinity (TX)	6
3	LaGrange	15
6	Trinity (TX)	3

Semifinals
4	Salisbury	5
5	Wis.-Stevens Point	2
2	Eastern Conn St.	8
3	LaGrange	1

Finals
4	Salisbury	6	2
2	Eastern Conn St.	11	3

== See also ==
- 2022 NCAA Division I baseball tournament
- 2022 NCAA Division II baseball tournament
- 2022 NCAA Division I softball tournament
