= 2021 NCAA Division III baseball tournament =

- Season: 2021
- Teams: 56
- Finals site: Perfect Game Field at Veterans Memorial Stadium; Cedar Rapids, Iowa
- Champions: Salisbury (1st title)
- Runner-up: St. Thomas
- Winning coach: Troy Brohawn (1 title)
- MOP: Jackson Balzan (Salisbury)

The 2021 NCAA Division III baseball tournament was the 45th edition of the NCAA Division III Baseball Championship. It was the first NCAA Division III tournament after the cancellation of the 2020 tournament as had been done with each of the Division tournaments for baseball. The tournament concluded with eight teams competing at Perfect Game Field at Veterans Memorial Stadium in Cedar Rapids, Iowa for the championship. Eight regional tournaments were held to determine the participants in the World Series.

== Teams ==
Auburn Region

- Eastern Connecticut State University
- State University of New York at Cortland
- Keystone College
- Mitchell College
- Tufts University
- United States Merchant Marine Academy

Collegeville Region

- University of St. Thomas
- University of Texas at Dallas
- York College of Pennsylvania
- Pacific University
- Chapman University
- University of Scranton

Decatur Region

- Washington University in St. Louis
- Webster University
- Denison University
- Millikin University
- Transylvania University
- Illinois College

Hartford Region

- University of Southern Maine
- SUNY Oswego
- Wheaton College
- Salve Regina University
- Husson University
- Johnson & Wales University

High Point Region

- Salisbury University
- Washington & Jefferson College
- LaGrange College
- University of Lynchburg
- Birmingham–Southern College
- Marymount University

Marietta Region

- Rowan University
- Marietta College
- North Carolina Wesleyan College
- St. John Fisher University
- University of Rochester
- Penn State Erie, The Behrend College

St. Paul Region

- Trinity University
- Aurora University
- Misericordia University
- University of Northwestern – St. Paul
- Saint Mary's University of Minnesota
- Johns Hopkins University

Whitewater Region

- Adrian College
- University of Wisconsin–Whitewater
- Texas Lutheran University
- Penn State Harrisburg
- Luther College
- Salem State University

== College World Series ==
=== Bracket ===
First round	Second round
Washington University	9
Johns Hopkins	3
Washington University	7
St. Thomas	8
St. Thomas	7
Adrian	5
Bracket 1
Johns Hopkins	9
Adrian	12
Washington University	16
Adrian	5
Rowan	0
Wheaton	6
Wheaton	9
3	Salisbury	11
Salisbury	11
SUNY Cortland	1
Bracket 2
Rowan	2
SUNY Cortland	4
Wheaton	2
SUNY Cortland	6

Semifinals
4	St. Thomas	6
5	Washington University	4
Salisbury	11
3	SUNY Cortland	8

Finals
St. Thomas	1	2
Salisbury	6	4
