= 2019 NCAA Division III baseball tournament =

- Season: 2019
- Teams: 58
- Finals site: Perfect Game Field at Veterans Memorial Stadium; Cedar Rapids, Iowa
- Champions: Chapman (2nd title)
- Runner-up: Birmingham-Southern
- MOP: Henry Zeisler (Chapman)

The 2019 NCAA Division III baseball tournament was the 44th edition of the NCAA Division III Baseball Championship. This was a 58-team tournament of college baseball at the NCAA Division III (D-III) level. The tournament concluded with eight teams competing at Perfect Game Field at Veterans Memorial Stadium in Cedar Rapids, Iowa for the championship. Eight regional tournaments were held to determine the participants in the World Series.

This was the first year in which the regional tournaments were contested in a "Super Regional" format, mirroring the Division I and II tournaments. Each "Super Regional" were split into two regionals, thirteen consisting of four teams to be contested in double-elimination format, with the other three consisting of two teams to be contested in a best-of-five format, for a total of 58 teams in the tournament. The regionals were followed by the "Super Regional" round, which were contested as a best-of-three series between the two regional winners for the spot in the D-III World Series.

This was the first D-III World Series contested at Veterans Memorial Stadium in Cedar Rapids, Iowa, which won the hosting rights for the D-III World Series from 2019 to 2022. The event was hosted by the American Rivers Conference, which was known as the Iowa Intercollegiate Athletic Conference when hosting rights were awarded in 2017.

== Regionals and Super Regionals ==
Bold indicates winner.

=== Orange Super Regional ===
Regional	Regional
1	Trinity (TX)	6
4	**Franklin**	**8**
4	Franklin	0
3	**Concordia (TX)**	**4**
2	Texas Lutheran	0
3	**Concordia (TX)**	**6**
Seguin Regional – Katt-Isbel Field
1	**Trinity (TX)**	**10**
2	Texas Lutheran	7	4	**Franklin**	**6**
1	Trinity (TX)	3

Regional Final
Whitman	5	**2**	4	**5**	2
**Chapman**	**10**	1	**9**	2	**3**
Orange Regional – Hart Park
3	**Concordia (TX)**	4
4	Franklin	**13**

Super Regional
**Chapman**	**11**	**3**	–
Concordia (TX)	3	2	–

=== Dallas Super Regional ===
Hosted by Misericordia University at Tambur Field

Regional	Regional
1	**Rowan**	**18**
4	Penn State-Abington	2
1	Rowan	0
3	**Washington & Jefferson**	**2**
2	Salisbury	1
3	**Washington & Jefferson**	**4**
Salisbury Regional – Sea Gull Baseball Field
4	Penn State-Abington	2
2	**Salisbury**	**5**	1	**Rowan**	**9**
2	Salisbury	6

Regional Final
**Misericordia**	**8**	**14**	**4**	–	–
Christopher Newport	4	9	3	–	–
Newport News Regional – Captains Park
3	**Washington & Jefferson**	**6**
1	Rowan	5

Super Regional
**Washington & Jefferson**	**8**	**5**	–
Misericordia	3	4	–

=== River Forest Super Regional ===
Regional	Regional
1	**Concordia-Chicago**	**2**
4	Buena Vista	0
1	Concordia-Chicago	8
2	**Baldwin Wallace**	**10**
2	**Baldwin Wallace**	**5**
3	St. John's (MN)	4^{10}
River Forest Regional – Cougar Field
4	**Buena Vista**	**7**
3	St. John's (MN)	3
1	**Concordia-Chicago**	**11**
4	Buena Vista	5
1	**Webster**	**11**
4	Bethany Lutheran	2
1	**Webster**	**7**
2	Wisconsin-Whitewater	5
2	**Wisconsin-Whitewater**	**9**
3	North Central	2
Whitewater Regional – Prucha Field at James B. Miller Stadium
4	Bethany Lutheran	4
3	**North Central**	**11**
2	Wisconsin-Whitewater	4
3	**North Central**	**13**

Regional Final
2	Baldwin Wallace	13	3
1	**Concordia-Chicago**	**14**	**5**
1	**Webster**	9	**11**
3	North Central	**14**	2

Super Regional
Concordia-Chicago	3	6	–
**Webster**	**4**	**17**	–

=== Boston Super Regional ===
Regional	Regional
1	**UMass-Boston**	**15**
4	Baruch	1
1	**UMass-Boston**	**12**
2	Wheaton (MA)	2
2	**Wheaton (MA)**	**9**
3	St. Joseph's (ME)	3
Boston Regional – Monan Park
4	Baruch	0
3	**St. Joseph's (ME)**	**11**
2	**Wheaton (MA)**	**7**
3	St. Joseph's (ME)	3
1	Southern Maine	2
4	**New England College**	**10**
4	**New England College**	**6**
3	MIT	5
2	SUNY Oswego	4
3	**MIT**	**5**
Gorham Regional – Ed Flaherty Field
1	**Southern Maine**	**3**
2	SUNY Oswego	2
3	MIT	5
1	**Southern Maine**	**14**

Regional Final
1	**UMass-Boston**	**6**	–
2	Wheaton (MA)	4	–
4	**New England College**	4	**7**
1	Southern Maine	**16**	6^{13}

Super Regional
**UMass-Boston**	**5**	4	**6**
New England College	4	**6**	2

=== Babson Park Super Regional ===
Hosted by Babson College at Govoni Field

Regional	Regional
1	**Babson**	**7**
4	Keystone	3
1	**Babson**	**4**
2	Trinity (CT)	1
2	**Trinity (CT)**	**11**
3	Salve Regina	3
Hartford Regional – Murren Family Field at DiBenedetto Stadium
4	Keystone	1
3	**Salve Regina**	**13**
2	**Trinity (CT)**	**7**
3	Salve Regina	2
1	**SUNY Cortland**	**7**
4	Alvernia	3
1	**SUNY Cortland**	**10**
3	Tufts	5
2	Penn State-Harrisburg	5
3	**Tufts**	**13**
Cortland Regional – Robert H. Wallace Field
4	Alvernia	12
2	**Penn State-Harrisburg**	**13**
3	**Tufts**	**7**
2	Penn State-Harrisburg	4

Regional Final
1	**Babson**	3	**10**
2	Trinity (CT)	**12**	3
1	**SUNY Cortland**	**18**	–
3	Tufts	5	–

Super Regional
**Babson**	**7**	**2**	–
SUNY Cortland	6	1	–

=== Baltimore Super Regional ===
Regional	Regional
1	TCNJ	4
4	**Susquehanna**	**5**
4	Susquehanna	2
2	**Johns Hopkins**	**12**
2	**Johns Hopkins**	**6**
3	SUNY Farmingdale	2
Baltimore Regional – Babb Field at Stromberg Stadium
1	**TCNJ**	**8**
3	SUNY Farmingdale	7^{13}
4	Susquehanna	4
1	**TCNJ**	**7**
1	Ithaca	2
4	**Westfield State**	**4**
4	Westfield State	1
2	**Kean**	**9**
2	**Kean**	**5**
3	Shenandoah	3
Union Regional – Jim Hynes Stadium
1	Ithaca	2
3	**Shenandoah**	**9**
4	Westfield State	1
3	**Shenandoah**	**7**

Regional Final
2	**Johns Hopkins**	**10**	–
1	TCNJ	3	–
2	Kean	4	1
3	**Shenandoah**	**6**^{10}	**4**

Super Regional
**Johns Hopkins**	**6**	**7**	–
Shenandoah	3	3	–

=== Birmingham Super Regional ===
Regional	Regional
1	**Washington University**	**14**
4	Cornell (IA)	1
1	Washington University	3
2	**Coe**	**5**
2	**Coe**	10
3	Aurora	1
St. Louis Regional – Kelly Field at Irv Utz Stadium
4	Cornell (IA)	2
3	**Aurora**	**3**	1	**Washington University**	**10**
3	Aurora	9^{11}

Regional Final
LaGrange	6	**11**	**6**	5	6
**Birmingham-Southern**	**15**	7	4	**8**	**14**
Birmingham Regional – Striplin Field
2	**Coe**	5
1	Washington University	**10**

Super Regional
**Birmingham-Southern**	**6**^{12}	**11**	–
Coe	4	2	–

=== Tiffin Super Regional ===
Hosted by Heidelberg University at Peaceful Valley

Regional	Regional
1	**Denison**	**4**
4	La Roche	0
1	Denison	1
2	**Heidelberg**	**2**
2	**Heidelberg**	**4**
3	Adrian	3
Adrian Regional – Nicolay Field
4	La Roche	4
3	**Adrian**	**6**^{10}
1	Denison	3
3	**Adrian**	**5**
1	Wooster	1
4	**Rochester**	**2**
4	Rochester	0
2	**Case Western Reserve**	**11**
2	**Case Western Reserve**	**4**
3	Otterbein	2
Wooster Regional – Art Murray Field
1	**Wooster**	**13**
3	Otterbein	3
4	Rochester	4
1	**Wooster**	**21**

Regional Final
2	**Heidelberg**	**9**	–
3	Adrian	6	–
2	Case Western Reserve	7	3
1	**Wooster**	**8**	**9**

Super Regional
**Heidelberg**	**8**	**14**	–
Wooster	5	1	–

== College World Series ==
Perfect Game Field at Veterans Memorial Stadium-Cedar Rapids, IA (Host: American Rivers Conference) Final game was June 4.

First round
Chapman	6
Washington & Jefferson	3
Webster	3
UMass-Boston	4
Washington & Jefferson	3
Webster	2
Babson	6
Johns Hopkins	7^{10}
Birmingham-Southern	6
Heidelberg	1
Babson	6
Heidelberg	5

Second round
Chapman	6
UMass-Boston	10
Chapman	8
Washington & Jefferson	4
Johns Hopkins	3
Birmingham-Southern	4^{10}
Johns Hopkins	6
Babson	5^{10}

Semifinals
UMass-Boston	4	4
Chapman	8	8
Birmingham-Southern	15	–
Johns Hopkins	4	–

Championship Series
Chapman	6	11	–
Birmingham-Southern	4	0	–
