= NCAA Division III baseball tournament =

American collegiate baseball tournament

- Current season, competition or edition: 2026 NCAA Division III baseball tournament
- Association: NCAA
- Sport: College baseball
- Founded: 1976; 50 years ago
- Division: Division III
- No. of teams: 56
- Country: United States
- Most recent champion: Denison (1st)
- Most titles: Marietta (6 titles)
- Broadcaster: ESPNU
- Website: NCAA.com

The NCAA Division III baseball tournament is an annual college baseball tournament held at the culmination of the spring regular season to determine the NCAA Division III baseball champion. The tournament has been played since 1976, soon after the formation of Division III.

Most of the 56 teams who qualify do so by winning an automatic bid that comes along with their conference's championship; others receive at-large bids. The initial round consists of six- and eight-team regionals held at pre-selected sites in eight regions: New England, New York, Mid-Atlantic, South, Mideast, Midwest, Central, and West. The eight regional champions advance to the final round of the Division III Baseball Championship tournament.

The tournament final will be hosted in WellSpan Park in York, Pennsylvania beginning in 2027.

== History ==
The event was formerly held at Fox Cities Stadium in Grand Chute, Wisconsin, just outside of Appleton for 18 years until it left for Veterans Memorial Stadium in Cedar Rapids, Iowa following the 2018 championships. The championship was held in Cedar Rapids four times beginning in 2019 and hosted by the American Rivers Conference. Cedar Rapids was set to only host until 2022, but was awarded the 2023 championships after 2020 was cancelled due to COVID-19. The championships will move to Classic Park in Eastlake, Ohio for the 2024 NCAA championships.

In both the regional and final rounds, the tournament uses a "double elimination" format, in which teams must lose twice to be eliminated.

Marietta is the most successful program, with six national titles.

Denison are the reigning national champions, winning their first championship in 2026.

== Results ==
NCAA Division III Baseball Championship
| Year | Site | Stadium | Championship Results | | |
| Year | Site | Stadium | Champion | Score | Runner-up |
|---|---|---|---|---|---|
| 1976; Details | Marietta, OH | Pioneer Park | Cal State Stanislaus | 13–6 | Ithaca |
| 1977; Details | Marietta, OH | Pioneer Park | Cal State Stanislaus (2) | 8–5 | Brandeis |
| 1978; Details | Marietta, OH | Pioneer Park | Glassboro State | 5–3 | Marietta |
| 1979; Details | Marietta, OH | Pioneer Park | Glassboro State (2) | 3–0 | Cal State Stanislaus |
| 1980; Details | Marietta, OH | Pioneer Park | Ithaca | 12–5 | Marietta |
| 1981; Details | Marietta, OH | Pioneer Park | Marietta | 14–12^{12} | Ithaca |
| 1982; Details | Marietta, OH | Pioneer Park | Eastern Connecticut State | 11–6 | Cal State Stanislaus |
| 1983; Details | Marietta, OH | Pioneer Park | Marietta (2) | 36–8 | Otterbein |
| 1984; Details | Marietta, OH | Pioneer Park | Ramapo | 5–4 | Marietta |
| 1985; Details | Marietta, OH | Pioneer Park | Wisconsin–Oshkosh | 11–6 | Marietta |
| 1986; Details | Marietta, OH | Pioneer Park | Marietta (3) | 11–6 | Ithaca |
| 1987; Details | Marietta, OH | Pioneer Park | Montclair State | 13–12^{10} | Wisconsin–Oshkosh |
| 1988; Details | Bristol, CT | Muzzy Field | Ithaca (2) | 7–5 | Wisconsin–Oshkosh |
| 1989; Details | Bristol, CT | Muzzy Field | North Carolina Wesleyan | 8–7^{13} | Cal State Stanislaus |
| 1990; Details | Battle Creek, MI | C. O. Brown Stadium | Eastern Connecticut State (2) | 8–1 | Aurora |
| 1991; Details | Battle Creek, MI | C. O. Brown Stadium | Southern Maine | 9–0 | Trenton State |
| 1992; Details | Battle Creek, MI | C. O. Brown Stadium | William Paterson | 3–1 | Cal Lutheran |
| 1993; Details | Battle Creek, MI | C. O. Brown Stadium | Montclair State (2) | 3–1 | Wisconsin–Oshkosh |
| 1994; Details | Battle Creek, MI | C. O. Brown Stadium | Wisconsin–Oshkosh (2) | 6–2 | Wesleyan (Conn.) |
| 1995; Details | Salem, VA | Kiwanis Field | La Verne | 5–3 | Methodist |
| 1996; Details | Salem, VA | Salem Memorial Baseball Stadium | William Paterson (2) | 6–5 | Cal Lutheran |
| 1997; Details | Salem, VA | Salem Memorial Baseball Stadium | Southern Maine (2) | 15–1 | Wooster |
| 1998; Details | Salem, VA | Salem Memorial Baseball Stadium | Eastern Connecticut State (3) | 16–1 | Montclair State |
| 1999; Details | Salem, VA | Salem Memorial Baseball Stadium | North Carolina Wesleyan (2) | 1–0 | St. Thomas (Minnesota) |
| 2000; Details | Grand Chute, WI | Fox Cities Stadium | Montclair State (3) | 6–2 | St. Thomas (Minnesota) |
| 2001; Details | Grand Chute, WI | Fox Cities Stadium | St. Thomas (MN) | 8–4 | Marietta |
| 2002; Details | Grand Chute, WI | Fox Cities Stadium | Eastern Connecticut State (4) | 8–0 | Marietta |
| 2003; Details | Grand Chute, WI | Fox Cities Stadium | Chapman | 15–7 | Christopher Newport |
| 2004; Details | Grand Chute, WI | Fox Cities Stadium | George Fox | 6–3 | Eastern Connecticut State |
| 2005; Details | Grand Chute, WI | Fox Cities Stadium | Wisconsin–Whitewater | 11–4 | Cortland |
| 2006; Details | Grand Chute, WI | Fox Cities Stadium | Marietta (4) | 7–2 | Wheaton (MA) |
| 2007; Details | Grand Chute, WI | Fox Cities Stadium | Kean | 5–4 | Emory |
| 2008; Details | Grand Chute, WI | Fox Cities Stadium | Trinity (CT) | 5–4 | Johns Hopkins |
| 2009; Details | Grand Chute, WI | Fox Cities Stadium | St. Thomas (MN) (2) | 3–2 | Wooster |
| 2010; Details | Grand Chute, WI | Fox Cities Stadium | Illinois Wesleyan | 17–5 | Cortland |
| 2011; Details | Grand Chute, WI | Fox Cities Stadium | Marietta (5) | 18–5 | Chapman |
| 2012; Details | Grand Chute, WI | Fox Cities Stadium | Marietta (6) | 7–2 | Wheaton (Mass.) |
| 2013; Details | Grand Chute, WI | Fox Cities Stadium | Linfield | 4–1 | Southern Maine |
| 2014; Details | Grand Chute, WI | Fox Cities Stadium | Wisconsin–Whitewater (2) | 7–0 | Emory |
| 2015; Details | Grand Chute, WI | Fox Cities Stadium | Cortland | 11–3, 6–2 | Wisconsin–La Crosse |
| 2016; Details | Grand Chute, WI | Fox Cities Stadium | Trinity (TX) | 14–6, 10–7 | Keystone |
| 2017; Details | Grand Chute, WI | Fox Cities Stadium | Cal Lutheran | 2–12, 12–4, 7–2 | Washington & Jefferson |
| 2018; Details | Grand Chute, WI | Fox Cities Stadium | Texas–Tyler | 8–1, 9–6 | Texas Lutheran |
| 2019; Details | Cedar Rapids, IA | Veterans Memorial Stadium | Chapman (2) | 6–4, 11–0 | Birmingham–Southern |
| 2020 | Canceled due to the COVID-19 pandemic | | | | |
| 2021; Details | Cedar Rapids, IA | Veterans Memorial Stadium | Salisbury | 6–1, 4–2 | St. Thomas (Minnesota) |
| 2022; Details | Cedar Rapids, IA | Veterans Memorial Stadium | Eastern Connecticut State (5) | 11–6, 3–2 | Salisbury |
| 2023; Details | Cedar Rapids, IA | Veterans Memorial Stadium | Lynchburg | 5–2, 6–11, 7–6 | Johns Hopkins |
| 2024; Details | Eastlake, OH | Classic Auto Group Park | Misericordia | 12–9, 10–16, 10–5 | Wisconsin–Whitewater |
| 2025; Details | Eastlake, OH | Classic Auto Group Park | Wisconsin–Whitewater (3) | 18–3, 21–5 | Messiah |
| 2026; Details | Eastlake, OH | Classic Auto Group Park | Denison | 6–0, 10–11^{10}, 4–3^{10} | Endicott |
| 2027 | York, PA | WellSpan Park | | | |
| 2028 | York, PA | WellSpan Park | | | |

== Champions ==
=== Active programs ===
| Team | Titles | Years |
|---|---|---|
| Marietta | 6 | 1981, 1983, 1986, 2006, 2011, 2012 |
| Eastern Connecticut State | 5 | 1982, 1990, 1998, 2002, 2022 |
| Wisconsin–Whitewater | 3 | 2005, 2014, 2025 |
| Montclair State | 3 | 1987, 1993, 2000 |
| Chapman | 2 | 2003, 2019 |
| North Carolina Wesleyan | 2 | 1989, 1999 |
| Southern Maine | 2 | 1991, 1997 |
| William Paterson | 2 | 1992, 1996 |
| Wisconsin–Oshkosh | 2 | 1985, 1994 |
| Ithaca | 2 | 1980, 1988 |
| Rowan | 2 | 1978, 1979 |
| Denison | 1 | 2026 |
| Misericordia | 1 | 2024 |
| Lynchburg | 1 | 2023 |
| Salisbury | 1 | 2021 |
| Cal Lutheran | 1 | 2017 |
| Trinity (TX) | 1 | 2016 |
| Cortland | 1 | 2015 |
| Linfield | 1 | 2013 |
| George Fox | 1 | 2004 |
| Illinois Wesleyan | 1 | 2010 |
| Trinity (CT) | 1 | 2008 |
| Kean | 1 | 2007 |
| La Verne | 1 | 1995 |
| Ramapo | 1 | 1984 |

=== Former programs ===
| Team | Titles | Years |
|---|---|---|
| St. Thomas (MN) | 2 | 2001, 2009 |
| Stanislaus State | 2 | 1976, 1977 |
| UT Tyler | 1 | 2018 |

Of the former programs listed here, St. Thomas now plays Division I baseball, and Stanislaus State and UT Tyler play Division II baseball.

== See also ==
- NCAA Division I baseball tournament
- NCAA Division II baseball tournament
- NAIA World Series
- List of college baseball awards
- National Club Baseball Association
- Pre-NCAA baseball champion
- U.S. college baseball awards
