= 2023 NCAA Division III baseball tournament =

- Season: 2023
- Teams: 56
- Finals site: Perfect Game Field at Veterans Memorial Stadium; Cedar Rapids, Iowa
- Champions: Lynchburg (1st title)
- Runner-up: Johns Hopkins
- Winning coach: Lucas Jones (1 title)

The 2023 NCAA Division III baseball tournament was the 47th edition of the NCAA Division III baseball tournament to determine the national champion of college baseball at the NCAA Division III (D-III) level. The tournament concluded with eight teams competing at Perfect Game Field at Veterans Memorial Stadium in Cedar Rapids, Iowa for the championship. Eight regional tournaments were held to determine the participants in the World Series. Lynchburg defeated Johns Hopkins in the three-game final to win their first championship. It was the first Division III championship in baseball for the Old Dominion Athletic Conference. After the game, Hornets coach Lucas Jones announced his retirement.

== Bracket ==
First round	Second round
1	Johns Hopkins	10
8	Misericordia	5
1	Johns Hopkins	10
5	Baldwin Wallace	6
4	Endicott	9
5	Baldwin Wallace	13
Bracket 1
8	Misericordia	13
4	Endicott	6
5	Baldwin Wallace	13
8	Misericordia	9
2	Salisbury	3
7	East Texas Baptist	7
7	East Texas Baptist	3
3	Lynchburg	8
3	Lynchburg	8
6	Wisconsin–La Crosse	6
Bracket 2
2	Salisbury	7
6	Wisconsin–La Crosse	2
7	East Texas Baptist	21
2	Salisbury	7

Semifinals
1	Johns Hopkins	3	8
Baldwin Wallace	6	2
3	Lynchburg	7
7	East Texas Baptist	1

Finals
1	Johns Hopkins	2	11	6
3	Lynchburg	5	6	7
