= 2014 NCAA Division III baseball tournament =

- Season: 2014
- Teams: 56
- Finals site: Neuroscience Group Field at Fox Cities Stadium; Grand Chute, Wisconsin
- Champions: Wisconsin–Whitewater (2nd title)
- Runner-up: Emory

The 2014 NCAA Division III baseball tournament was played at the end of the 2014 NCAA Division III baseball season to determine the 39th national champion of college baseball at the NCAA Division III level. The tournament concluded with eight teams competing at Neuroscience Group Field at Fox Cities Stadium in Grand Chute, Wisconsin for the championship. Eight regional tournaments were held to determine the participants in the World Series. Regional tournaments were contested in double-elimination format, with four regions consisting of six teams, and four consisting of eight, for a total of 56 teams participating in the tournament. The tournament champion was Wisconsin–Whitewater, who defeated Emory for the championship.

== Bids ==
The 56 competing teams were:

=== By conference ===
Conference	Total	Schools
Ohio Athletic Conference	4	Baldwin Wallace, Heidelberg, John Carroll, Marietta
New England Small College Athletic Conference	3	Amherst, Tufts, Wesleyan (CT)
New Jersey Athletic Conference	3	Kean, Rowan, Rutgers-Camden
Wisconsin Intercollegiate Athletic Conference	3	Wisconsin–La Crosse, Wisconsin–Stevens Point, Wisconsin–Whitewater
Landmark Conference	2	Moravnian, Susquehanna
Little East Conference	2	Eastern Connecticut State, Southern Maine
Old Dominion Athletic Conference	2	Bridgewater (VA), Shenandoah
Southern Athletic Association	2	Birmingham–Southern, Rhodes
University Athletic Association	2	Case Western, Emory
Allegheny Mountain Collegiate Conference	1	La Roche
American Southwest Conference	1	LeTourneau
Capital Athletic Conference	1	Salisbury
Centennial Conference	1	Haverford
College Conference of Illinois and Wisconsin	1	Illinois Wesleyan
Colonial States Athletic Conference	1	Keystone
Commonwealth Coast Conference	1	Endicott
Empire 8	1	Stevens
Great Northeast Athletic Conference	1	St. Joseph's (ME)
Heartland Collegiate Athletic Conference	1	Rose-Hulman
Iowa Intercollegiate Athletic Conference	1	Buena Vista
Liberty League	1	Union (NY)
Massachusetts State Collegiate Athletic Conference	1	Worcester State
Michigan Intercollegiate Athletic Association	1	Adrian
MAC Commonwealth Conference	1	Widener
MAC Freedom Conference	1	Misericordia
Midwest Conference	1	St. Norbert
Minnesota Intercollegiate Athletic Conference	1	St. Thomas (MN)
New England Collegiate Conference	1	Mitchell
New England Women's and Men's Athletic Conference	1	MIT
North Atlantic Conference	1	Castelton State
North Coast Athletic Conference	1	DePauw
North Eastern Athletic Conference	1	Penn State–Berks
Northern Athletics Collegiate Conference	1	Concordia-Chicago
Northwest Conference	1	Linfield
Presidents' Athletic Conference	1	Thomas More
St. Louis Intercollegiate Athletic Conference	1	Webster
Southern California Intercollegiate Athletic Conference	1	Cal Lutheran
Southern Collegiate Athletic Conference	1	Trinity (TX)
State University of New York Athletic Conference	1	SUNY Cortland
Upper Midwest Athletic Conference	1	St. Scholastica
USA South Athletic Conference	1	Covenant
Independents	0	none

== Regionals ==
Bold indicates winner.

=== Central Regional ===
Brunner Field in the Duane R. Swanson Stadium-Moline, IL (Host: Augustana College (Illinois))

First round
1	Webster	1
6	**DePauw**	**2**
2	**St. Thomas (MN)**	**4**
5	Rose-Hulman	2
3	**Buena Vista**	**7**
4	St. Scholastica	1

Second round/elimination round 1
**DePauw**	**6**
St. Scholastica	5
**St. Thomas (MN)**	**11**
Buena Vista	5
Webster	2
**Rose-Hulman**	**3**^{11}

Semifinals/elimination round 2
DePauw	8
**St. Thomas (MN)**	**14**
Buena Vista	3
**Rose-Hulman**	**4**^{13}

Elimination final
DePauw	0
**Rose-Hulman**	**1**

Final
**St. Thomas**	**9**	--
Rose-Hulman	4	--

=== West Regional ===
Roy Helser Field and Jim Wright Stadium-McMinnville, OR (Host: Linfield College)

First round
1	**Linfield**	**1**
6	LeTourneau	0
2	**Cal Lutheran**	**2**
5	Illinois Wesleyan	1
3	Trinity (TX)	2
4	**Wisconsin-Stevens Point**	**3**

Second round/elimination round 1
**Linfield**	**4**
Trinity (TX)	1
Cal Lutheran	2
**Wisconsin-Stevens Point**	**5**
**LeTourneau**	**3**
Illinois Wesleyan	2

Semifinals/elimination round 2
**Linfield**	**3**
Wisconsin-Stevens Point	2
**Cal Lutheran**	**2**
LeTourneau	1

Elimination final
**Wisconsin-Stevens Point**	**9**
Cal Lutheran	7^{12}

Final
**Linfield**	**4**	--
Wisconsin-Stevens Point	2	--

=== Mid-Atlantic Regional ===
PNC Field-Moosic, PA (Host: Misericordia University)

First round/elimination round 1	Second round/elimination round 2	Semifinals/elimination semifinals	Finals
4	**Baldwin Wallace**	**8**
5	Misericordia	4
**Baldwin Wallace**	**10**
Haverford	2
1	Moravian	1
8	**Haverford**	**3**
**Baldwin Wallace**	**4**
Susquehanna	1
3	**Susquehanna**	**5**
6	Keystone	3
**Susquehanna**	**5**
Rowan	4
2	**Rowan**	**7**
7	Wesleyan (CT)	2	**Baldwin Wallace**	**9**	--
Wesleyan (CT)	7	--
Lower round 1	Lower round 2	Lower round 3	Lower final
Rowan	0
**Misericordia**	**4**	**Misericordia**	**1**	Susquehanna	3
Moravian	3	Misericordia	1	**Wesleyan (CT)**	**4**
**Wesleyan (CT)**	**6**
Haverford	3
Keystone	0	**Wesleyan (CT)**	**6**
**Wesleyan (CT)**	**6**

=== South Regional ===
Loudermilk Field-Demorest, GA (Host: Piedmont College)

First round
1	**Shenandoah**	**11**
6	Covenant	3
2	**Emory**	**4**
5	Rhodes	2
3	Birmingham-Southern	0
4	**Bridgewater (VA)**	**1**^{12}

Second round/elimination round 1
**Shenandoah**	**5**
Birmingham-Southern	4^{11}
Emory	4
**Bridgewater (VA)**	**7**
Covenant	3
**Rhodes**	**5**

Semifinals/elimination round 2
Shenandoah	3
**Bridgewater (VA)**	**5**
**Emory**	**4**
Rhodes	3

Elimination final
Shenandoah	8
**Emory**	12

Final
Bridgewater (VA)	3	2
**Emory**	**11**	**5**

=== New York Regional ===
Colburn Park-Newark, NY (Host: Ithaca College)

First round/elimination round 1	Second round/elimination round 2	Semifinals/elimination semifinals	Finals
4	Rutgers-Camden	2
5	**Farmingdale State**	**4**
Farmingdale State	5
**SUNY Cortland**	**14**
1	**SUNY Cortland**	**2**
8	Castleton State	1
**SUNY Cortland**	**3**
Amherst	2
3	**Amherst**	**4**
6	Stevens	3
**Amherst**	**7**
Kean	1
2	**Kean**	**5**
7	Union (NY)	4	**SUNY Cortland**	**10**	--
Kean	1	--
Lower round 1	Lower round 2	Lower round 3	Lower final
**Kean**	**5**
**Rutgers-Camden**	**18**	Rutgers-Camden	4	Amherst	3
Castleton State	11	**Kean**	**6**	**Kean**	**4**
Farmingdale State	5^{10}
**Farmingdale State**	**6**
**Stevens**	**10**	Stevens	2
Union (NY)	3

=== Mideast Regional ===
Schaly Stadium-Marietta, OH (Host: Marietta College)

First round/elimination round 1	Second round/elimination round 2	Semifinals/elimination semifinals	Finals
4	**Widener**	**8**
5	La Roche	1
**Widener**	**5**
Marietta	4
1	**Marietta**	**14**
8	Penn State-Berks	2
Widener	2
**Salisbury**	**5**
3	**Salisbury**	**9**
6	John Carroll	8
**Salisbury**	**6**
Case Western	2
2	**Case Western**	**6**
7	Thomas More	2	**Salisbury**	**3**	--
Case Western	2	--
Lower round 1	Lower round 2	Lower round 3	Lower final
**Case Western**	**8**
**La Roche**	**7**	La Roche	0	Widener	2
Penn State-Berks	1	**Case Western**	**18**	**Case Western**	**3**^{13}
Thomas More	3
Marietta	5
John Carroll	8	**Thomas More**	**7**
**Thomas More**	**9**^{12}

=== New England Regional ===
Whitehouse Field-Harwich, MA (Host: Eastern College Athletic Conference)

First round/elimination round 1	Second round/elimination round 2	Semifinals/elimination semifinals	Finals
4	**Endicott**	**6**
5	MIT	4
**Endicott**	**4**
Mitchell	2
1	Eastern Connecticut State	3
8	**Mitchell**	**4**^{11}
Endicott	4
**Southern Maine**	**8**
3	**Tufts**	**3**
6	St. Joseph's (ME)	1
Tufts	2
**Southern Maine**	**3**
2	**Southern Maine**	**8**
7	Worcester State	4	**Southern Maine**	4	**11**
Endicott	**6**	1
Lower round 1	Lower round 2	Lower round 3	Lower final
Mitchell	4
**Eastern Connecticut State**	**6**	**MIT**	**6**	**Endicott**	**7**
MIT	2	**MIT**	**4**	MIT	3
St. Joseph's (ME)	3
Tufts	2
**St. Joseph's (ME)**	**4**	**St. Joseph's (ME)**	**9**
Worcester State	2

=== Midwest Regional ===
Prucha Field at James B. Miller Stadium-Whitewater, WI (Host: University of Wisconsin-Whitewater)

First round
1	**Wisconsin-Whitewater**	**6**
6	St. Norbert	2
2	Heidelberg	1
5	**Adrian**	**8**
3	**Concordia-Chicago**	**3**
4	Wisconsin-La Crosse	1

Second round/elimination round 1
**Wisconsin-Whitewater**	**13**
Wisconsin-La Crosse	3
**Adrian**	**4**
Concordia-Chicago	1
**St. Norbert**	**9**
Heidelberg	5

Semifinals/elimination round 2
**Wisconsin-Whitewater**	**6**
Adrian	2
**Concordia-Chicago**	**5**
St. Norbert	1

Elimination final
**Adrian**	**3**
Concordia-Chicago	2

Final
**Wisconsin-Whitewater**	**5**	--
Adrian	4	--

== World Series ==
Neuroscience Group Field at Fox Cities Stadium-Grand Chute, WI (Host: University of Wisconsin-Oshkosh/Lawrence University/Fox Cities Convention and Visitors Bureau)

First round/elimination round 1	Second round/elimination round 2	Semifinals/elimination semifinals	Finals
C2	St. Thomas (MN)	10
W1	Linfield	0
St. Thomas (MN)	5
Baldwin Wallace	4
MA4	Baldwin Wallace	5
S2	Emory	4
St. Thomas (MN)	4
Wisconsin-Whitewater	10
NY1	SUNY Cortland	4
ME3	Salisbury	3
SUNY Cortland	6
Wisconsin-Whitewater	9
NE2	Southern Maine	1
MW1	Wisconsin-Whitewater	8	Wisconsin-Whitewater	7	--
Emory	0	--
Lower round 1	Lower round 2	Lower round 3	Lower final
SUNY Cortland	7
Linfield	5	Emory	9	St. Thomas (MN)	7
Emory	8	Emory	15	Emory	10
Southern Maine	3
Baldwin Wallace	5
Salisbury	3	Southern Maine	11
Southern Maine	6
