= 2016 NCAA Division III baseball tournament =

- Season: 2016
- Teams: 56
- Finals site: Neuroscience Group Field at Fox Cities Stadium; Grand Chute, Wisconsin
- Champions: Trinity (TX) (1st title)
- Runner-up: Keystone
- MOP: Drew Butler (Trinity (TX))

The 2016 NCAA Division III baseball tournament was played at the end of the 2016 NCAA Division III baseball season to determine the 41st national champion of college baseball at the NCAA Division III level. The tournament concluded with eight teams competing at Neuroscience Group Field at Fox Cities Stadium in Grand Chute, Wisconsin for the championship. Eight regional tournaments were held to determine the participants in the World Series. Regional tournaments were contested in double-elimination format, with four regions consisting of six teams, and four consisting of eight, for a total of 56 teams participating in the tournament. The tournament champion was Trinity (TX), who defeated Keystone in the championship series in two games.

== Bids ==
The 56 competing teams were:

=== By conference ===
Conference	Total	Schools
New Jersey Athletic Conference	3	Kean, Ramapo, TCNJ
University Athletic Association	3	Case Western, Emory, Washington University in St. Louis
Capital Athletic Conference	2	Frostburg State, Salisbury
Centennial Conference	2	Haverford, Johns Hopkins
College Conference of Illinois and Wisconsin	2	Augustana (IL), North Central (IL)
Iowa Intercollegiate Athletic Conference	2	Luther, Wartburg
Little East Conference	2	Eastern Connecticut State, UMass–Boston
North Coast Athletic Conference	2	Ohio Wesleyan, Wooster
Northwest Conference	2	Pacific Lutheran, Whitworth
Old Dominion Athletic Conference	2	Randolph–Macon, Shenandoah
State University of New York Athletic Conference	2	Cortland, Oswego
Wisconsin Intercollegiate Athletic Conference	2	Wisconsin–La Crosse, Wisconsin–Whitewater
Allegheny Mountain Collegiate Conference	1	La Roche
American Southwest Conference	1	Texas–Tyler
Colonial States Athletic Conference	1	Keystone
Commonwealth Coast Conference	1	Salve Regina
Empire 8	1	St. John Fisher
Great Northeast Athletic Conference	1	Suffolk
Heartland Collegiate Athletic Conference	1	Rose-Hulman
Landmark Conference	1	Susquehanna
Liberty League	1	Union (NY)
Massachusetts State Collegiate Athletic Conference	1	Salem State
Michigan Intercollegiate Athletic Association	1	Kalamazoo
MAC Commonwealth Conference	1	Widener
MAC Freedom Conference	1	Misericordia
Midwest Conference	1	Beloit
Minnesota Intercollegiate Athletic Conference	1	Saint John's (MN)
New England Collegiate Conference	1	Mitchell
New England Small College Athletic Conference	1	Tufts
New England Women's and Men's Athletic Conference	1	Wheaton (MA)
North Atlantic Conference	1	Castelton
North Eastern Athletic Conference	1	Penn State–Berks
Northern Athletics Collegiate Conference	1	Concordia (IL)
Ohio Athletic Conference	1	Marietta
Presidents' Athletic Conference	1	Thomas More
St. Louis Intercollegiate Athletic Conference	1	Westminster (MO)
Skyline Conference	1	St. Joseph's-Long Island
Southern Athletic Association	1	Birmingham–Southern
Southern California Intercollegiate Athletic Conference	1	Cal Lutheran
Southern Collegiate Athletic Conference	1	Trinity (TX)
Upper Midwest Athletic Conference	1	St. Scholastica
USA South Athletic Conference	1	Huntingdon
Independents	0	none

== Regionals ==
Bold indicates winner.

=== South Regional ===
William R. Bowdoin Field-Mount Berry, GA (Host: Berry College)

First round
1	**Emory**	**6**
6	Thomas More	5
2	**Shenandoah**	**3**
5	Marietta	2
3	**Birmingham–Southern**	**7**
4	Huntingdon	0

Second round/elimination round 1
**Emory**	**8**
Marietta	0
**Shenandoah**	**6**
Birmingham–Southern	2
**Thomas More**	**4**
Huntingdon	2

Semifinals/elimination semifinals
**Emory**	**14**
Shenandoah	7
Thomas More	9
**Birmingham–Southern**	**16**

Elimination finals
Birmingham–Southern	8
**Shenandoah**	**10**

Finals
**Emory**	**15**	—
Shenandoah	2	—

=== New York Regional ===
Leo Pinckney Field at Falcon Park-Auburn, NY (Host: State University of New York at Cortland)

First round
1	**Cortland**	**14**
6	Castelton	4
2	**Susquehanna**	**11**
5	Frostburg State	8
3	**Ramapo**	**3**
4	Union (NY)	2^{10}

Second round/elimination round 1
**Cortland**	**6**
Frostburg State	0
Susquehanna	2
**Ramapo**	**9**
**Castleton**	**3**
Union (NY)	1

Semifinals/elimination semifinals
**Cortland**	**13**
Ramapo	4
Castleton	2
**Susquehanna**	**7**

Elimination finals
**Susquehanna**	**7**
Ramapo	2

Finals
**Cortland**	6	**10**
Susquehanna	**8**	9

=== West Regional ===
Avista Stadium-Spokane, WA (Host: Whitworth University/Spokane Sports Commission)

First round
1	**Trinity (TX)**	**7**
6	Pacific Lutheran	3
2	**Texas–Tyler**	**7**
5	Cal Lutheran	3
3	**Whitworth**	**8**
4	Case Western	5

Second round/elimination round 1
**Trinity (TX)**	**10**
Case Western	0
**Texas–Tyler**	**6**
Whitworth	4
Cal Lutheran	6
**Pacific Lutheran**	**8**

Semifinals/elimination semifinals
Texas–Tyler	2
**Trinity (TX)**	**14**
**Pacific Lutheran**	**8**
Whitworth	5

Elimination finals
**Pacific Lutheran**	**3**
Texas–Tyler	2

Finals
**Trinity (TX)**	**12**	—
Pacific Lutheran	7	—

=== Midwest Regional ===
Copeland Park-La Crosse, WI (Host: University of Wisconsin-La Crosse)

Upper round 1	Upper round 2	Upper final	Final
4	**Luther**	**8**
5	North Central (IL)	6
Luther	3
**Concordia (IL)**	**16**
1	**Concordia (IL)**	**13**
8	Kalamazoo	2
Concordia (IL)	3
**Wisconsin–La Crosse**	**12**
3	**Wisconsin–La Crosse**	**17**
6	Beloit	2
**Wisconsin–La Crosse**	**10**
St. John's (MN)	0
2	**Saint John's (MN)**	**7**
7	St. Scholastica	2	**Wisconsin–La Crosse**	**5**	—
St. John's (MN)	3	—
Lower round 1	Lower round 2	Lower round 3	Lower final
North Central (IL)	2
**North Central (IL)**	**4**	**St. John's (MN)**	**8**	**St. John's (MN)**	**7**
Kalamazoo	2	**St. John's (MN)**	**5**	Concordia (IL)	5^{11}
Luther	4^{10}
St. Scholastica	2
Beloit	1	**Luther**	**3**
**St. Scholastica**	**8**

=== Mid-Atlantic Regional ===
PNC Field-Moosic, PA (Host: Misericordia University)

Upper round 1	Upper round 2	Upper final	Final
4	**Kean**	**7**
5	Salisbury	1
Kean	0
**St. John Fisher**	9
1	**St. John Fisher**	**6**
8	Salve Regina	5
**St. John Fisher**	**6**
UMass–Boston	5
3	**UMass–Boston**	**6**
6	Haverford	2
**UMass–Boston**	**10**
Penn State–Berks	5
2	**Penn State–Berks**	**3**
7	Misericordia	2	**St. John Fisher**	**8**	—
Kean	2	—
Lower round 1	Lower round 2	Lower round 3	Lower final
Salisbury	2
**Salisbury**	**5**	**Penn State–Berks**	**5**^{12}	**Kean**	**5**
Salve Regina	3	Penn State–Berks	4	UMass–Boston	1
**Kean**	**7**
Haverford	5
**Haverford**	**7**	**Kean**	**11**
Misericordia	6^{10}

=== New England Regional ===
Eastern Baseball Stadium-Mansfield, CT (Host: Eastern Connecticut State University)

Upper round 1	Upper round 2	Upper final	Final
4	**Tufts**	**8**
5	Mitchell	1
**Tufts**	**2**
Oswego State	0
1	**Oswego State**	**3**
8	Eastern Connecticut State	2
Tufts	3
**Keystone**	**11**
3	**Keystone**	**5**
6	Suffolk	2
**Keystone**	**7**
Salem State	1
2	**Salem State**	**7**
7	Wheaton (MA)	4	**Keystone**	**7**	—
Tufts	5	—
Lower round 1	Lower round 2	Lower round 3	Lower final
Mitchell	2
**Mitchell**	**3**	**Salem State**	**3**^{12}	Oswego State	1
Eastern Connecticut State	2	Salem State	3	**Tufts**	**7**
**Oswego State**	**7**
Wheaton (MA)	0
Suffolk	5	**Oswego State**	**2**
**Wheaton (MA)**	**6**

=== Central Regional ===
GCS Ballpark-Sauget, IL (Host: Webster College)

First round
1	**Wisconsin–Whitewater**	**11**
6	Westminster (MO)	4
2	**Rose-Hulman**	**7**
5	Wartburg	2
3	**Washington University**	**8**
4	Augustana (IL)	0

Second round/elimination round 1
**Wisconsin–Whitewater**	**15**
Augustana (IL)	3
**Rose-Hulman**	**6**
Washington University	5
**Wartburg**	**8**
Westminster (MO)	0

Semifinals/elimination semifinals
**Rose-Hulman**	**8**
Wisconsin–Whitewater	0
Wartburg	1
**Washington University**	**5**

Elimination finals
Washington University	8
**Wisconsin–Whitewater**	**9**^{14}

Finals
Rose-Hulman	0	3
**Wisconsin–Whitewater**	**11**	**5**

=== Mideast Regional ===
Ross Memorial Park-Washington, PA (Host: Washington & Jefferson College)

Upper round 1	Upper round 2	Upper final	Final
4	**La Roche**	**7**
5	Widener	6
**La Roche**	**4**
TCNJ	3
1	**TCNJ**	**10**
8	Ohio Wesleyan	0
La Roche	6
**Randolph–Macon**	**19**
3	**Randolph–Macon**	**8**
6	St. Joseph's-Long Island	0
**Randolph–Macon**	**2**
Wooster	1
2	**Wooster**	**8**
7	Johns Hopkins	5	Randolph–Macon	2	3
**La Roche**	**7**^{12}	**4**
Lower round 1	Lower round 2	Lower round 3	Lower final
Widener	9
**Widener**	**9**	**Wooster**	**16**	Wooster	0
Ohio Wesleyan	0	**Wooster**	**5**	**La Roche**	**13**
TCNJ	3
St. Joseph's-Long Island	5
**St. Joseph's-Long Island**	**3**	**TCNJ**	15
Johns Hopkins	0

== World Series ==
Neuroscience Group Field at Fox Cities Stadium-Grand Chute, WI (Host: University of Wisconsin-Oshkosh/Lawrence University/Fox Cities Convention and Visitors Bureau)

First round/elimination round 1
S1	Emory	0
NY1	Cortland	1
W1	Trinity (TX)	8
MW3	Wisconsin–La Crosse	0
Emory	3
Wisconsin–La Crosse	12
MA1	St. John Fisher	3
NE3	Keystone	16
C1	Wisconsin–Whitewater	3
ME4	La Roche	5
St. John Fisher	4
Wisconsin–Whitewater	3

Second round/elimination finals
Cortland	2
Trinity (TX)	5
SUNY Cortland	8
Wisconsin–La Crosse	3
Keystone	6
La Roche	1
La Roche	9
St. John Fisher	6

Semifinals
Trinity (TX)	5	—
Cortland	2	—
Keystone	5	—
La Roche	4^{10}	—

Championship Series
Trinity (TX)	14	10	—
Keystone	6	7	—
