= Ray Katt =

American baseball player (1927–1999)

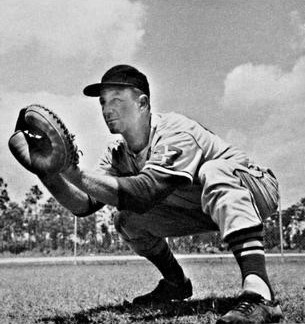
- Catcher
- Born: May 9, 1927; New Braunfels, Texas, U.S.
- Died: October 19, 1999 (aged 72); New Braunfels, Texas, U.S.
- Batted: Right Threw: Right

MLB debut
- September 16, 1952, for the New York Giants

Last MLB appearance
- July 21, 1959, for the St. Louis Cardinals

MLB statistics
- Batting average: .232
- Home runs: 32
- Runs batted in: 120
- Stats at Baseball Reference

Teams
- New York Giants (1952–1956); St. Louis Cardinals (1956); New York Giants (1957); St. Louis Cardinals (1958–1959)

Career highlights and awards
- World Series champion (1954)

Raymond Frederick Katt (May 9, 1927 – October 19, 1999) was an American professional baseball player and coach. He played as a catcher in Major League Baseball during the 1950s, and later became the longtime and highly successful head baseball coach of Texas Lutheran University. A lifelong resident of New Braunfels, Texas, Katt stood 6 ft 2 in (1.88 m) tall, weighed 200 pounds (91 kg), and threw and batted right-handed in his playing days. He attended Texas A&M University.

== Playing career ==
Katt spent his entire Major League playing career with the New York Giants and the St. Louis Cardinals, spending two separate terms with each club. Katt originally signed with the Giants and after two brief trials with them in 1952–53, he became the club's semi-regular backstop during its final championship season in New York in 1954. Playing in 86 games, he split catching duties with veteran Wes Westrum, hitting .255 with nine home runs and 33 runs batted in.

That year, he set a Major League record with four passed balls in one inning, catching knuckleballer Hoyt Wilhelm. The record was later tied by Geno Petralli of the Texas Rangers in 1987, catching knuckleballer Charlie Hough, and by Ryan Lavarnway of the Boston Red Sox in 2013, catching knuckleballer Steve Wright in Wright's first big-league start.

Westrum took over the catching during the 1954 World Series, won by the Giants in four consecutive games, and Katt did not appear. However, in 1955, he became the club's regular receiver, playing in 124 games and compiling a career-high 326 at bats, but his batting average plummeted to .215 and he spent the rest of his MLB career as a back-up.

He was first traded to the Cardinals on June 14, 1956, in a nine-player trade that included notables Alvin Dark and Red Schoendienst, and batted a creditable .259 in part-time duty for the Redbirds through the end of the 1956 season. During the winter, though, St. Louis shipped him to the Chicago Cubs, who in turn peddled him back to the Giants on the eve of the 1957 regular season. Katt was a member of the final New York Giants club before it transferred to San Francisco, batting 165 times in 72 games in 1957. He was traded back to the Cardinals in April 1958, and closed out his active MLB career with them as a third-string catcher in 1958 and a playing coach in 1959. In all or parts of eight major league seasons (1952–59), Katt appeared in 417 games, and batted .232 with 32 home runs and 120 runs batted in for 1,071 at bats.

== Coaching career ==
Katt was a bullpen coach for the Cardinals from 1959 through June 15, 1960, and first-base coach for the Cleveland Indians in 1962. In between, he managed the Triple-A Portland Beavers for the final eight weeks of the 1961 season.

He then returned to Texas — first as a high school baseball coach in New Braunfels, and then as head baseball coach at Texas Lutheran, where he served for 22 seasons (1971–92), the team compiling a record of 502–362–2. Katt-Isbel Field, home of the college's baseball team, is named in his honor.

Katt died at age 72 from lymphoma in New Braunfels.

== See also ==
- List of St. Louis Cardinals coaches

== Sources ==
- Baseball Reference (MLB)
- Baseball Reference (MiLB)
- 1951–52 Habana (Liga Profesional Cubana)
- Retrosheet
- Van Hyning, Thomas (1999). The Santurce Crabbers : Sixty Seasons of Puerto Rican Winter League Baseball. McFarland & Company. ISBN 978-0-7864-0662-3
- Ray Katt at SABR (baseball bio project)
