= Shay Neary =

American fashion model (born 1987 or 1988)

- Born: 1987 or 1988 (age 38–39); Poconos, Pennsylvania, U.S.
- Education: Keystone College
- Occupation: Fashion model
- Modeling information
- Hair color: Auburn
- Eye color: Brown
- Agency: Unsigned
- Website: shayneary.com

Shay Neary is an American fashion model. She is known as the first transgender plus-size model to be featured in a major fashion campaign.

Neary was born and raised in the Pocono Mountains in Pennsylvania. During high school, she identified as a gay man, and performed in drag. A transgender friend of her mother suggested to Neary that she might also be trans.

Neary attended Keystone College in northeastern Pennsylvania, and started her transition to female during her freshman year there. In 2012, she received the Outstanding Leadership Award from the Rainbow Alliance. Neary later moved to New York, as she had difficulty accessing hormones while in college.

In 2016, Neary was signed by the fashion brand Coverstory, becoming the first openly trans plus-size model to land a major campaign. Coverstory founder Heidi Kan found Neary through the Transmodel agency after a lengthy search. In 2017, Neary came to the UK to model for the plus-size brand Yours Clothing.

Neary has spoken out against transphobia and fat-shaming she has experienced in online dating communities.

== See also ==
- LGBTQ culture in New York City
- List of LGBTQ people from New York City
