= Troy Brohawn =

American baseball player (born 1973)

- Baseball career
- Pitcher
- Born: January 14, 1973 (age 53); Cambridge, Maryland, U.S.
- Batted: Left Threw: Left

MLB debut
- April 14, 2001, for the Arizona Diamondbacks

Last MLB appearance
- May 12, 2003, for the Los Angeles Dodgers

MLB statistics
- Win–loss record: 4–4
- Earned run average: 4.86
- Strikeouts: 46
- Stats at Baseball Reference

Teams
- Arizona Diamondbacks (2001); San Francisco Giants (2002); Los Angeles Dodgers (2003)

Career highlights and awards
- World Series champion (2001); D3 College World Series champion (2021)
- Coaching career

Coaching career (HC unless noted)
- 2006–2009: Salisbury (pitching)
- 2009–2015: Cambridge-South Dorchester High School
- 2015–present: Salisbury

Head coaching record
- Overall: 244-70-2
- Tournaments: NCAA: 29–14
Medal record
Men's baseball
Representing United States
World Junior Baseball Championship
Bronze medal – third place	1990 Cuba	Team

Michael Troy Brohawn (born January 14, 1973) is an American former professional baseball pitcher. He played in Major League Baseball (MLB) for the Arizona Diamondbacks, San Francisco Giants, and Los Angeles Dodgers between 2001 and 2003.

== Amateur career ==
A native of Cambridge, Maryland, Brohawn graduated from Cambridge-South Dorchester High School in 1991, and spent three years at the University of Nebraska–Lincoln, where he played college baseball for the Cornhuskers. He was named First Team All-American in 1993, posting a 13–0 record with nine complete games, and setting a school record with 123 strikeouts in 111.1 innings. In addition to his sterling moundwork, Brohawn batted .329 with three homers and 34 RBIs playing first base. After the 1993 season, he played collegiate summer baseball with the Wareham Gatemen of the Cape Cod Baseball League and was named a league all-star. He was selected by the San Francisco Giants in the 4th round of the 1994 MLB draft.

== Professional career ==
Brohawn spent 1994 and 1995 with the Class A San Jose Giants, and by 1998 he had progressed to the Giants' Triple A affiliate Fresno Grizzlies. The Giants traded Brohawn to the Arizona Diamondbacks after the 1998 season.

Brohawn made his major league debut with Arizona in 2001, and earned a World Series ring with the 2001 Diamondbacks. In the regular season, he tossed 49.1 innings in 59 appearances with a 4.93 ERA. On April 29, 2001, Brohawn picked up his only save at the MLB level. He pitched 2/3rd of an inning to close out a 7-5 Diamondbacks victory over the Braves. He made one postseason appearance, retiring the New York Yankees in the ninth inning of Game 6 of the 2001 World Series, a 15-2 Diamondbacks romp that knotted the series at three games apiece. In Brohawn's one inning of work, he allowed one hit and no runs in relief of Baseball Hall of Famer Randy Johnson, and struck out Clay Bellinger for the game's final out.

After the 2001 season, Brohawn signed as a free agent with San Francisco, and appeared in 11 games for the Giants in 2002. He signed with the Dodgers prior to the 2003 season, and appeared in 12 games, posting a 3.86 ERA in 2003, his final big league season. Arm problems plagued his career, forcing his retirement in 2004.

== Coaching career ==
He was the head coach for the Cambridge-South Dorchester High baseball team, his alma mater. From 2009 to 2011 he worked as a gym and health teacher.

In July 2014 he was named head baseball coach at Salisbury University, an NCAA Division III school in Salisbury, Maryland. In his first season as head coach (2015), he led Salisbury to the Division III College World Series. In 2021, he again led Salisbury to the College World Series, in which the Seagulls won the first national championship in team history.

== Honors ==
In 2008, Brohawn was inducted into the Eastern Shore League Baseball Hall of Fame.

== Personal ==
In 2010, he married Stephanie Abt and together they raised three children.

== See also ==
- 1993 College Baseball All-America Team

== Sources ==
- Career statistics from MLB · Baseball Reference · Baseball Reference (Minors) · Retrosheet · Baseball Almanac
