= 2006 NCAA Division II baseball tournament =

- Season: 2006
- Finals site: Montgomery Riverwalk Stadium; Montgomery, Alabama
- Champions: Tampa (4th title)
- Runner-up: Chico State (4th CWS Appearance)
- Winning coach: Joe Urso (1st title)
- MOP: Lee Cruz, DH (Tampa)
- Attendance: 33,677

The 2006 NCAA Division II baseball tournament was the postseason tournament hosted by the NCAA to determine the national champion of baseball among its Division II members at the end of the 2006 NCAA Division II baseball season.

The final, eight-team double elimination tournament, also known as the College World Series, was played at Montgomery Riverwalk Stadium in Montgomery, Alabama from May 27–June 3, 2006.

Tampa defeated Chico State in the championship game, 3–2, to claim the Spartans' fourth Division II national title and first since 1998.

== Bracket ==
=== College World Series ===
First Rounds; May 27–30, 2006	Second Rounds; May 29–May 31, 2006
Tampa	4
Francis Marion	3
Tampa	5
Montevallo	4
Montevallo	3
West Chester	2
Bracket One
Franklin Pierce	4
Emporia State	0
Ashland	2
Franklin Pierce	7
Ashland	14
Franklin Pierce	4
Ashland	4
Chico State	8
Chico State	2
Emporia State	1
Bracket Two
Francis Marion	2
West Chester	3
Montevallo	10
West Chester	3

Semifinals; June 1, 2006
Tampa	13	–
Franklin Pierce	3	–
Chico State	9	–
Montevallo	5	–

Championship; June 3, 2006
Tampa	3
Chico State	2

== See also ==
- 2006 NCAA Division I baseball tournament
- 2006 NCAA Division III baseball tournament
- 2006 NAIA World Series
