= Dave Kern =

American soccer player

Personal information
- Full name: David Kern
- Date of birth: March 23, 1981 (age 45)
- Place of birth: Glenolden, Pennsylvania, United States
- Height: 6 ft 1 in (1.85 m)
- Position: Goalkeeper

College career
| Years | Team | Apps | (Gls) |
| 1999–2002 | Misericordia Cougars | | |

Senior career*
| Years | Team | Apps | (Gls) |
| 2004–2007 | Harrisburg City Islanders | 41 | (0) |
| 2007–2010 | Baltimore Blast (indoor) | 16 | (0) |
| 2009 | Real Maryland Monarchs | 13 | (0) |
- * Club domestic league appearances and goals as of 12 April 2010

Dave Kern (born March 23, 1981, in Glenolden, Pennsylvania) is an American soccer player who last played for the Real Maryland Monarchs of the USL Second Division, and for Baltimore Blast in the Major Indoor Soccer League.

== Career ==
=== College ===
Kern attended Cardinal O'Hara High School and played college soccer at Misericordia University in Dallas, Pennsylvania, where he posted at 0.75 goals against average en route to the school's first-ever NCAA Tournament appearance in 2000. He was named his team's MVP in 2001 and 2002, earned First-Team All-Middle Atlantic Region selections in 2000 and 2002, Second-Team All-Middle Atlantic Region in 2001 and was a three-time All-PA Conference selection.

=== Professional ===
Kern began his career in 2004 when he signed with the Harrisburg City Islanders in the USL Second Division, and subsequently became the team's starting goalkeeper in all four years at the team, winning the USL2 championship in 2007.

In September 2007 Kern left Harrisburg to join the Baltimore Blast of the Major Indoor Soccer League as their backup goalkeeper, helping the team win an American Indoor Championship in his debut season.

Kern signed for the Real Maryland Monarchs in 2009.
