= 2006 NCAA Division III baseball tournament =

- Season: 2006
- Teams: 53
- Finals site: Fox Cities Stadium; Grand Chute, Wisconsin
- Champions: Marietta (4th title)
- Runner-up: Wheaton (MA)

The 2006 NCAA Division III baseball tournament was played at the end of the 2006 NCAA Division III baseball season to determine the 31st national champion of college baseball at the NCAA Division III level. The tournament concluded with eight teams competing at Fox Cities Stadium in Grand Chute, Wisconsin for the championship. Eight regional tournaments were held to determine the participants in the World Series. Regional tournaments were contested in double-elimination format, with three regions consisting of six teams and five consisting of seven, for a total of 53 teams participating in the tournament, up from 42 in 2005. The tournament champion was Marietta, who defeated Wheaton (MA) for the championship.

== Bids ==
The 53 competing teams were:

== Regionals ==
=== West Regional ===
W.O. Hart Field-Orange, CA (Host: Chapman University)

First round
1	Redlands	3
6	George Fox	10
2	Trinity (TX)	11
5	Texas Lutheran	4
3	Chapman	7
4	Cal State East Bay	2

Second round/elimination round 1
George Fox	4
Cal State East Bay	6
Redlands	2
Texas Lutheran	3
Trinity (TX)	2
Chapman	7
George Fox	11
Trinity (TX)	5

Semifinals
Cal State East Bay	4
Texas Lutheran	7
Chapman	7
George Fox	1

Final
Texas Lutheran	3	3
Chapman	1	4

=== New York Regional ===
Leo Pinckney Field at Falcon Park-Auburn, NY (Host: Ithaca College)

Upper round 1	Upper round 2	Upper final	Final
1	Cortland State	9
Eastern Connecticut State	0
4	Eastern Connecticut State	4
5	St. Lawrence	3
Cortland State	8
Ithaca	3
3	Ithaca	7
6	Endicott	3
Ithaca	8
Rensselaer	7^{11}
2	Rensselaer	14
7	Centenary (NJ)	2
Cortland State	5	7
Eastern Connecticut State	9	10
Lower round 1	Lower round 2	Lower round 3	Lower final
Eastern Connecticut State	16
Endicott	4	Centenary (NJ)	3	Ithaca	3
Centenary (NJ)	13	Eastern Connecticut State	4	Eastern Connecticut State	14
St. Lawrence	1
Rensselaer	12
St. Lawrence	4

=== South Regional ===
Bauer Field-Rocky Mount, NC (Host: North Carolina Wesleyan College)

First round
1	Salisbury	3
6	Virginia Wesleyan	8
2	Emory	3
5	N.C. Wesleyan	7
3	Rowan	2
4	Bridgewater (VA)	4

Second round/elimination round 1
Virginia Wesleyan	5
Rowan	17
Salisbury	9
Emory	7
N.C. Wesleyan	7
Bridgewater (VA)	5
Virginia Wesleyan	5
Bridgewater (VA)	2

Semifinals
Rowan	9
Salisbury	5
N.C. Wesleyan	9
Virginia Wesleyan	5

Final
Rowan	2	2
N.C. Wesleyan	0	4^{10}

=== New England Regional ===
Whitehouse Field-Harwich, MA (Host: Eastern College Athletic Conference)

Upper round 1	Upper round 2	Upper final	Final
Salem State	2
1	Wheaton (MA)	5
4	Salem State	8
5	Southern Maine	5
Wheaton (MA)	6
Western New England	0
3	St. Joseph's (ME)	9
6	Bowdoin	7
St. Joseph's (ME)	10
Western New England	11^{10}
2	Middlebury	2
7	Western New England	14
Wheaton (MA)	16	--
Southern Maine	5	--
Lower round 1	Lower round 2	Lower round 3	Lower final
Salem State	4
Bowdoin	8	Middlebury	14	Western New England	3
Middlebury	10	Middlebury	10	Southern Maine	6
Southern Maine	12
St. Joseph's (ME)	1
Southern Maine	10

=== Mid-Atlantic Regional ===
Boyertown Bear Stadium-Boyertown, PA (Host: Alvernia University)

Upper round 1	Upper round 2	Upper final	Final
1	TCNJ	3
Franklin & Marshall	0
4	Gwynedd-Mercy	1
5	Franklin & Marshall	14
TCNJ	3
Kean	1
3	Montclair State	2
6	Frostburg State	6
Frostburg State	5
Kean	12
2	Kean	6
7	Alvernia	5
TCNJ	1	1
Montclair State	2	5
Lower round 1	Lower round 2	Lower round 3	Lower final
Franklin & Marshall	10
Montclair State	13	Montclair State	19	Kean	0
Alvernia	8	Montclair State	7	Montclair State	7
Frostburg State	2
Frostburg State	3
Gwynedd-Mercy	2

=== Central Regional ===
Kelly Field at Irv Utz Stadium-St. Louis, MO (Host: Washington University in St. Louis)

First round
1	Carthage	6
6	Mt. St. Joseph	7
2	Millsaps	15
5	Webster	1
3	Washington-St. Louis	3
4	Aurora	9

Second round/elimination round 1
Mt. St. Joseph	7
Washington-St. Louis	6
Millsaps	11
Aurora	3
Carthage	18
Webster	3

Semifinals/elimination round 2
Mt. St. Joseph	5
Millsaps	13
Aurora	5
Carthage	4

Elimination final
Mt. St. Joseph	10
Aurora	11

Final
Millsaps	6	11
Aurora	8	12

=== Midwest Regional ===
Witter Field-Wisconsin Rapids, WI (Host: University of Wisconsin-Stevens Point)

Upper round 1	Upper round 2	Upper final	Final
St. Scholastica	8
1	Ripon	14
4	St. Scholastica	4
5	Wisconsin-Stevens Point	3
Ripon	7
St. Olaf	4
3	St. Olaf	17
6	Dominican	8
St. Olaf	8
Coe	2
2	St. Thomas (MN)	4
7	Coe	5^{10}
Ripon	4	4
Wisconsin-Stevens Point	7	6
Lower round 1	Lower round 2	Lower round 3	Lower final
St. Scholastica	3
Dominican	3	St. Thomas (MN)	13	St. Olaf	4
St. Thomas (MN)	22	St. Thomas (MN)	2	Wisconsin-Stevens Point	11
Wisconsin-Stevens Point	6
Coe	5
Wisconsin-Stevens Point	16

=== Mideast Regional ===
Art Nehf Field-Terre Haute, IN (Host: Rose-Hulman Institute of Technology)

Upper round 1	Upper round 2	Upper final	Final
Manchester	5
1	Wooster	4
4	Manchester	10
5	Adrian	5
Manchester	9
Marietta	10
3	Otterbein	3
6	Elizabethtown	7^{10}
Elizabethtown	5
Marietta	10
2	Marietta	11
7	King's	2
Marietta	1	8
Otterbein	4	7^{11}
Lower round 1	Lower round 2	Lower round 3	Lower final
Wooster	1
Otterbein	7	Otterbein	4	Manchester	7
King's	2	Otterbein	4^{11}	Otterbein	13
Adrian	3
Elizabethtown	2
Adrian	3

== World Series ==
Fox Cities Stadium-Grand Chute, WI (Host: University of Wisconsin-Oshkosh/Lawrence University)

First round/elimination round 1	Second round/elimination round 2	Semifinals/elimination semifinals	Finals
W3	Chapman	6
NY4	Eastern Connecticut State	3
Chapman	3
Wheaton (MA)	0
S5	N.C. Wesleyan	0
NE1	Wheaton (MA)	2
Chapman	4
Marietta	10
MA3	Montclair State	7
C3	Aurora	2
Montclair State	4
Marietta	7
MW5	Wisconsin-Stevens Point	1
ME2	Marietta	2	Marietta	7	--
Wheaton (MA)	2	--
Lower round 1	Lower round 2	Lower round 3	Lower final
Montclair State	5
Eastern Connecticut State	9	Eastern Connecticut State	4^{11}	Chapman	3
N.C. Wesleyan	8	Montclair State	4	Wheaton (MA)	4
Wheaton (MA)	13
Wheaton (MA)	5
Aurora	3	Wisconsin-Stevens Point	4
Wisconsin-Stevens Point	12

== See also ==
- 2006 NCAA Division I baseball tournament
- 2006 NCAA Division II baseball tournament
- 2006 NAIA World Series
