= Cedar Rapids Kernels =

American Minor League baseball team

- Founded in 1949; Cedar Rapids, Iowa

Team logo	Cap insignia

Minor league affiliations
- Class: High-A (2021–present)
- Previous classes: Class A (1962–2020); Class B (1950–1961); Class C (1949)
- League: Midwest League (1962–present)
- Division: West Division
- Previous leagues: Three-I League (1950–1961); Central Association (1949)

Major league affiliations
- Team: Minnesota Twins (2013–present)
- Previous teams: Los Angeles Angels of Anaheim (1993–2012); Cincinnati Reds (1980–1992); San Francisco Giants (1975–1979); Houston Astros (1973–1974); St. Louis Cardinals (1965–1972); Cincinnati Reds (1963–1964); Milwaukee Braves (1958–1962); Brooklyn Dodgers (1955–1957); Chicago Cubs (1953–1954); Cleveland Indians (1950–1952)

Minor league titles
- League titles (5): 1958; 1988; 1992; 1994; 2023
- Division titles (2): 2023; 2025
- First-half titles (3): 2022; 2023; 2025

Team data
- Name: Cedar Rapids Kernels (1993–present)
- Previous names: Cedar Rapids Reds (1980–1992); Cedar Rapids Giants (1975–1979); Cedar Rapids Astros (1973–1974); Cedar Rapids Cardinals (1965–1972); Cedar Rapids Red Raiders (1963–1964); Cedar Rapids Braves (1958–1962); Cedar Rapids Raiders (1953–1957); Cedar Rapids Indians (1950–1952); Cedar Rapids Rockets (1949)
- Colors: Yellow, red, navy blue, green, white
- Ballpark: Veterans Memorial Stadium (2002–present)
- Previous parks: Veterans Memorial Stadium (I) (1949–2001)
- Owner(s)/ Operator(s): Cedar Rapids Ball Club, Inc.
- General manager: Sean Brandhorst
- Manager: Brian Meyer
- Website: milb.com/cedar-rapids

The Cedar Rapids Kernels are a Minor League Baseball team of the Midwest League and the High-A affiliate of the Minnesota Twins. They are located in Cedar Rapids, Iowa, and play their home games at Veterans Memorial Stadium. They were founded in 1949 as the Cedar Rapids Rockets and originally played in the Central Association and the Three-I League. The Kernels are owned by Cedar Rapids Ball Club, Inc. (also known as Cedar Rapids Baseball Club, Inc.).

== Cedar Rapids baseball history ==
Professional baseball has been played in Cedar Rapids since 1890. Cedar Rapids teams have been a member of various leagues preceding the current franchise. They have been a member of the Western League (1934–1937), Mississippi Valley League (1922–1932), Central Association (1913–1917), Illinois–Indiana–Iowa League (1901–1909, 1920–1921, 1938–1942), Western Association (1896–1899), Eastern Iowa League (1895) and the Illinois–Iowa League (1890–1891). Cedar Rapids teams also had numerous nicknames prior to the current franchise: Cedar Rapids Raiders (1934–1942), Cedar Rapids Red Raiders (1963–1964), Cedar Rapids Bunnies (1904–1932), Cedar Rapids Rabbits (1896–1903) and Cedar Rapids Canaries (1890–1891).

The current Cedar Rapids franchise was founded in 1949 as a member of the Class C Central Association, and was called the Cedar Rapids Rockets. The moniker of "Rockets" was chosen via a name-the-team contest. After the 1949 season, the Rockets moved to the Three-I League to replace the Springfield, Illinois team that the league had just dropped.

Cedar Rapids played in the Three-I League until it folded after the 1961 season, at which point they moved to the Midwest League along with the Fox City Foxes and the Burlington Bees.

When Cedar Rapids entered the Midwest League in 1962, the franchise switched back to the Red Raiders (1962–1964) nickname. Subsequently, the team used the name of the major league franchise it affiliated with: the Cardinals (1965–1972), the Astros (1973–1974), the Giants (1975–1979), and the Reds (1980–1992). The team adopted the current "Kernels" nickname before the 1993 season. On the field, the franchise won Midwest League championships in 1988, 1992, 1994, and 2023.

In conjunction with Major League Baseball's restructuring of Minor League Baseball in 2021, the Kernels were organized into the High-A Central. In 2022, the High-A Central became known as the Midwest League, the name historically used by the regional circuit prior to the 2021 reorganization.

== Ballpark ==
The team's first home ballpark the original Veterans Memorial Stadium, which opened in 1949. In August 2000 voters approved a referendum to build a new ballpark adjacent to the old one, which was demolished after the 2001 season. The new Veterans Memorial Stadium was completed in time for the opening of the 2002 season, and the Kernels set a franchise attendance record of 196,066 in the new park's inaugural year.

== Roster ==
Cedar Rapids Kernels roster
Players	Coaches/Other
Pitchers: 43 Christian Becerra; 30 Jesse Bergin; 30 Miguelangel Boadas; 23 Adrian Bohorquez; -- Michael Carpenter; 2 Dasan Hill; 35 Garrett Horn; 46 Xavier Kolhosser; 41 Cesar Lares; 32 Justin Mitrovich; 37 Mitch Mueller; 25 Cole Peschl; 19 Ivran Romero; 31 Michael Ross; 38 Yehizon Sanchez; 26 Nolan Santos; 21 Kolten Smith; -- Charlee Soto; 45 Nick Trabacchi; 48 Brian Zeldin; Catchers: 44 Enrique Jimenez; 27 Eduardo Tait; Infielders: 1 Miguel Briceno; 8 Danny De Andrade; 24 Rayne Doncon; 12 Henry Kusiak; 33 Andy Lugo; 11 Dameury Pena; 9 Jose Salas; Outfielders: 4 Graham Brown; 15 Jacob McCombs; 17 Yasser Mercedes	Manager: 16 Brian Meyer; Coaches: 22 Erick Julio (pitching); 49 Danny Marcuzzo (hitting); 20 Yeison Perez (hitting); 18 Hunter Townsend (pitching); 60-day injured list: 44 Jason Doktorczyk; -- Ross Dunn; -- Tanner Hall (full season); 50 Sam Rochard; 21 Eston Stull; 7-day injured list; * On Minnesota Twins 40-man roster; ~ Development list; # Rehab assignment; ∞ Reserve list; ‡ Restricted list; § Suspended list; † Temporarily inactive list; Roster updated July 18, 2026; Transactions; → More rosters: MiLB • Midwest League; → Minnesota Twins minor league players

Casey Kotchman bats against the Clinton LumberKings, September 1, 2002

== Notable alumni ==
- Lou Boudreau (1938) Inducted Baseball Hall of Fame, (1970)
- Trevor Hoffman (1991) Inducted Baseball Hall of Fame, (2018)
- Joe Mauer (2014) Inducted Baseball Hall of Fame, (2024)
- John McGraw (1891) Inducted Baseball Hall of Fame, (1937)
- Ted Simmons (1967) Inducted Baseball Hall of Fame, (2020)
- Barney Pelty (1903)
- Bill Wambsganss (1913)
- Bill Zuber (1932)
- Allie Reynolds (1940–41) 5x MLB All-Star; 1952 AL ERA Leader
- Rocky Colavito (1952) 6x MLB All-Star; 1959 AL Home Run Leader; 1965 AL RBI Leader
- John Roseboro (1955) 4x MLB All-Star
- Denis Menke (1958–59) 2x MLB All-Star
- Tony Cloninger (1959)
- Tommie Aaron (1960)
- Ron Hunt (1960–61) 2x MLB All-Star
- Nate Colbert (1965) 3x MLB All-Star
- Pedro Borbon (1966)
- Jerry Reuss (1967) x MLB All-Star
- Ken Reitz (1969) GG; MLB All-Star
- Bob Forsch (1970)
- Jerry Mumphrey (1972) MLB All-Star
- Larry Herndon (1972)
- Joe Sambito (1974) MLB All-Star
- Bob Brenly (1977) MLB All-Star; MGR: 2001 World Series Champions – Arizona Diamondbacks
- Chili Davis (1978) 3x MLB All-Star
- Rob Deer (1979)
- Eric Davis (1982) 2 x MLB All-Star
- Paul O'Neill (1982) 5 x MLB All-Star
- Chris Sabo (1983) 3 x MLB AS; 1988 NL Rookie of the Year
- Kal Daniels (1983)
- Kurt Stillwell (1984) MLB All-Star
- Rob Dibble (1985) 2x MLB All-Star
- Reggie Sanders (1990) MLB All-Star
- Bengie Molina (1994–95)
- Jason Dickson (1995) MLB All-Star
- Jarrod Washburn (1995)
- Ramón Ortiz (1997)
- Ken Hill (1998) MLB All-Star
- John Lackey (2000) MLB All-Star; 2007 AL ERA Leader
- Bobby Jenks (2001) 2x MLB All-Star
- Mike Napoli (2001–02) MLB All-Star
- Ervin Santana (2002) 2x MLB All-Star
- Casey Kotchman (2002)
- Jeff Mathis (2002)
- Joel Peralta (2002)
- Joe Saunders (2002) MLB All-Star
- Alberto Callaspo (2003)
- Erick Aybar (2003) MLB All-Star
- Howie Kendrick (2004) MLB All-Star
- Sean Rodriguez (2004)
- Alexi Casilla (2004–05)
- Miguel González (2005)
- Nick Adenhart (2006) Died Age 22
- Darren O'Day (2006) MLB All-Star
- Mark Trumbo (2006–07) MLB All-Star
- Jordan Walden (2008) MLB All-Star
- Mike Trout (2009–10) 11x MLB All-Star; 2012 AL Rookie of the Year; 3x AL Most Valuable Player (2014, 2016, 2019)
- Garrett Richards (2010)
- Jean Segura (2010) MLB All-Star
- Patrick Corbin (2010) 2x MLB All-Star; 2019 World Series Champion – Washington Nationals
- Mike Clevinger (2012)
- Byron Buxton (2013)
- Ricky Nolasco (2015)
