= Katt-Isbel Field =

Baseball park in Seguin, Texas, US

Coordinates: 29.57766°N 97.9833°W

Katt-Isbel Field is a baseball park located in Seguin, Texas, and home to the Texas Lutheran Bulldogs of the American Southwest Conference. The venue holds a capacity of 650.
