= Veterans Memorial Stadium (Cedar Rapids) =

Baseball stadium in Cedar Rapids, Iowa

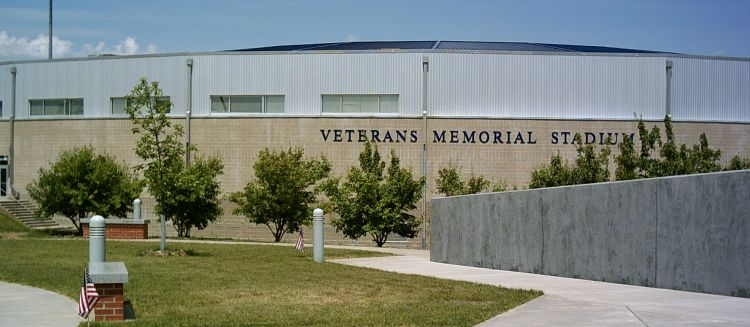

- Location within Iowa Location within the United States
- Interactive map of Veterans Memorial Stadium
- Address: 950 Rockford Road SW; Cedar Rapids, IA 52404; United States
- Coordinates: 41°58′5″N 91°41′11″W
- Owner: City of Cedar Rapids
- Operator: Cedar Rapids Baseball Club, Inc.
- Capacity: 5,300 (2007–present); 6,000 (2002–2006)
- Surface: Grass
- Field size: Left field – 315 ft (96 m); Left-center – 378 ft (115 m); Center field – 400 ft (122 m); Right-center – 390 ft (119 m); Right field – 325 ft (99 m)

Construction
- Groundbreaking: June 13, 2001
- Opened: April 7, 2002
- Cost: US$16.49 million ($29.5 million in 2025 dollars)
- Architects: 360 Architecture (formerly Heinlein Schrock Stearns); Leo Pfeiffer Architects
- Structural engineers: Martin/Martin, Inc.
- Services engineers: Smith Seckman Reid, Inc.
- General contractor: Estes Construction

Tenants
- Cedar Rapids Kernels (MWL) 2002–present NCAA Division III College World Series 2019–2022

Veterans Memorial Stadium is a minor league baseball stadium in Cedar Rapids, Iowa. It is the home field of the Cedar Rapids Kernels of the Midwest League. It is often called New Veterans Memorial Stadium to distinguish it from the original Veterans Memorial Stadium, which existed from 1949 to 2001.

== Overview ==
Veterans Memorial Stadium is located southwest of downtown Cedar Rapids on Rockford Road. ImOn Ice Arena and Kingston Stadium, home to Kennedy, Jefferson, and Washington high school football, are both adjacent to Veterans Memorial Stadium.

Veterans Memorial Stadium has a total seating capacity of 5,300. It has 12 luxury suites and several sections that are reserved for group outings, including a mezzanine terrace in the upper deck behind first base, a pavilion in left field, and a pre-game picnic area.

In addition to Kernels games, Veterans Memorial Stadium hosted the Midwest League All-Star Game in 2004, and again in 2016. On July 9, 2005, the stadium hosted its first concert, featuring Bob Dylan and Willie Nelson. The American Legion World Series was held there in 2006. It is also occasionally used for high school and college baseball games, including the annual American Rivers Conference baseball tournament. It hosted the annual "Corridor Classic" between the Iowa Hawkeyes and the Northern Iowa Panthers until the University of Northern Iowa discontinued its baseball program.

The city of Cedar Rapids owns Veterans Memorial Stadium, which was named to honor veterans of all wars, and the city's Veterans Memorial Commission operates and maintains the stadium. The Linn County All Veterans Memorial is located next to the stadium. In March 2004 the Kernels and the city agreed to a new 40-year lease agreement that reduced the ballclub's monthly payments from the original 20-year agreement that they had signed when the new stadium opened.

In March 2008 the Kernels sold the naming rights of the playing field to the Dale and Thomas Popcorn Company. The playing field was known as Dale and Thomas Popcorn Field at Veterans Memorial Stadium for the 2008 season. The field was renamed Perfect Game Field at Veterans Memorial Stadium when Perfect Game USA, a baseball scouting company based in Cedar Rapids, bought the naming rights to the field in March 2009 in a five-year contract.

In 2017, the stadium won a bid to host the NCAA Division III College World Series from 2019 to 2022, after long time host of the event the Fox Cities Stadium in Grand Chute, WI chose not to bid on the rights to host the event after 2018.

== History ==
The original Veterans Memorial Stadium was built in 1949 for the Cedar Rapids Rockets of the Central Association. It later became home to the Cedar Rapids Indians (1950–1952), the Cedar Rapids Raiders (1953–1957), and the Cedar Rapids Braves (1958–1961) of the Illinois–Indiana–Iowa League. From 1962 until its demolition, Cedar Rapids' Midwest League teams—which went through several name changes before becoming the Kernels in 1993—played their home games there.

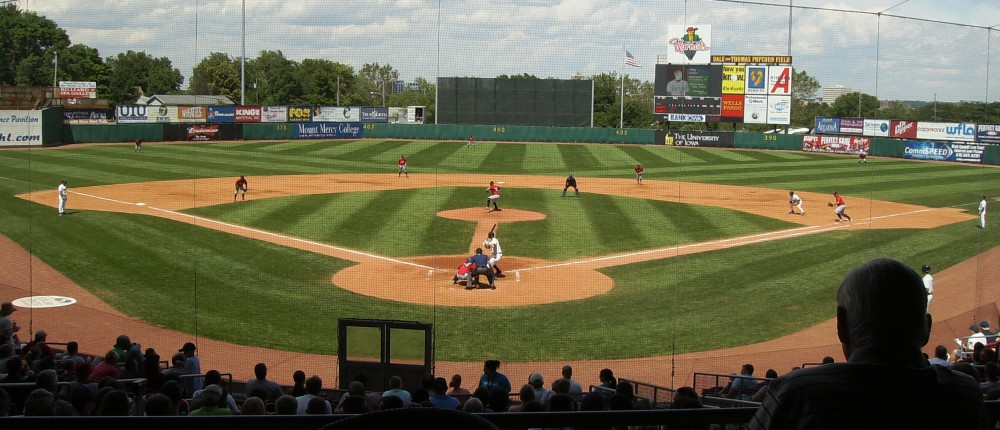
Playing field at the new Veterans Memorial Stadium, during a June 22, 2008, game against the Quad Cities River Bandits

During the 1990s, Veterans Memorial Stadium failed to meet many of Major League Baseball's new standards for minor league parks as newer facilities were opening in other Midwest League cities. On August 15, 2000, Cedar Rapids voters approved a referendum that helped provide some of the money needed to build a new ballpark adjacent to the old one. (Other funds came from the state of Iowa, the Kernels ballclub, and private donations.) The last game at the old Veterans Memorial Stadium was played on August 28, 2001, with the Kernels defeating the Wisconsin Timber Rattlers, 4–1. The stadium was demolished shortly afterwards and the site now serves as a parking lot for the new stadium.

The new Veterans Memorial Stadium was dedicated on April 7, 2002, but that day's scheduled game against the Quad City River Bandits was rained out. The first games were not played until April 9, when the Kernels swept a doubleheader from the River Bandits, 5–4 and 3–0.

The ballpark was damaged by a derecho storm which hit Cedar Rapids on August 10, 2020. Damage was estimated at $1 million, with outfield walls, an electronic ribbon advertising board, and a light pole beyond right-center field all blown down.
