= Wheaton Lyons =

College sports teams

- College: Wheaton College
- Conference: NEWMAC
- NCAA: Division III
- Athletic director: Gavin Viano
- Location: Norton, Massachusetts
- Varsity teams: 21 (9 men's 12 women's)
- Basketball arena: Emerson Gymnasium
- Baseball stadium: Sidell Stadium
- Softball stadium: Clark Softball Field
- Soccer field: Keefe Field (men's) Mirrione Stadium (women's)
- Aquatics center: Balfour Natatorium
- Lacrosse field: Nordin Field
- Tennis venue: Clark Tennis Courts
- Outdoor track and field venue: Beard Field House (indoor)
- Mascot: Roary the Lyon
- Nickname: Lyons
- Colors: Blue and white
- Website: wheatoncollegelyons.com
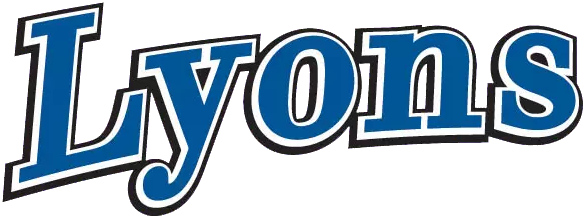

The Wheaton Lyons represents Massachusetts' Wheaton College and fields 21 varsity intercollegiate teams, 9 for men and 12 for women, in addition to 14 club sports programs and a variety of intramural activities. The school's teams play within the NCAA Division III and in the New England Women's and Men's Athletic Conference (NEWMAC).

== Background ==
The Wheaton Lyons finished in the top 15% of the NACDA Directors' Cup in 2013–14, highlighted by women's track and field, which placed fourth in the NCAA indoor championship and tied for sixth at the outdoor championship. Also contributing to Wheaton's point total was men's soccer, women's lacrosse and softball. Men's soccer and women's lacrosse both won the New England Women’s and Men’s Athletic Conference (NEWMAC) championship and advanced to the NCAA tournament second round, while softball earned an at-large bid to the NCAA tournament after a 30-win season.

Wheaton has found success in a number of its athletic programs, starting in 1983, when field hockey became the first Wheaton team to make an NCAA tournament. In 1986, women's lacrosse became the first Wheaton team to advance to an NCAA Final Four. Eight years later, women's basketball made its first Final Four, followed by the 1997 softball team finishing third at the national tournament in Eau Claire, Wisconsin. The following fall, men's soccer became the first men's team to make the NCAA tournament, followed by volleyball advancing to the NCAA Sweet Sixteen.

In addition, men's and women's cross-country, women's lacrosse, men's and women's swimming and diving and women's tennis all have competed in the NCAA post-season. Overall, Wheaton has won eight NCAA National Championships, 17 ECAC championships and 101 combined NEWMAC regular season and tournament titles.

== Nickname ==
Wheaton's mascot is a Lyon, named after founding principal Mary Lyon which can be traced back to the early 1980s. On October 14, 2016, the Wheaton College Athletic Department announced the first-ever mascot name for the Lyon... Roary. Hundreds of potential names were submitted as the Mascot Naming Committee narrowed the searched down to three names: Roary, Lee-O and Wheat T. The Wheaton College community voted for their favorite name during a span of two weeks and after votes were tabulated, Roary the Lyon was officially unveiled during Fall Fest 2016.

== Varsity sports ==
Wheaton College Varsity programs include the 11 men's teams and 13 women's teams, such as follows:

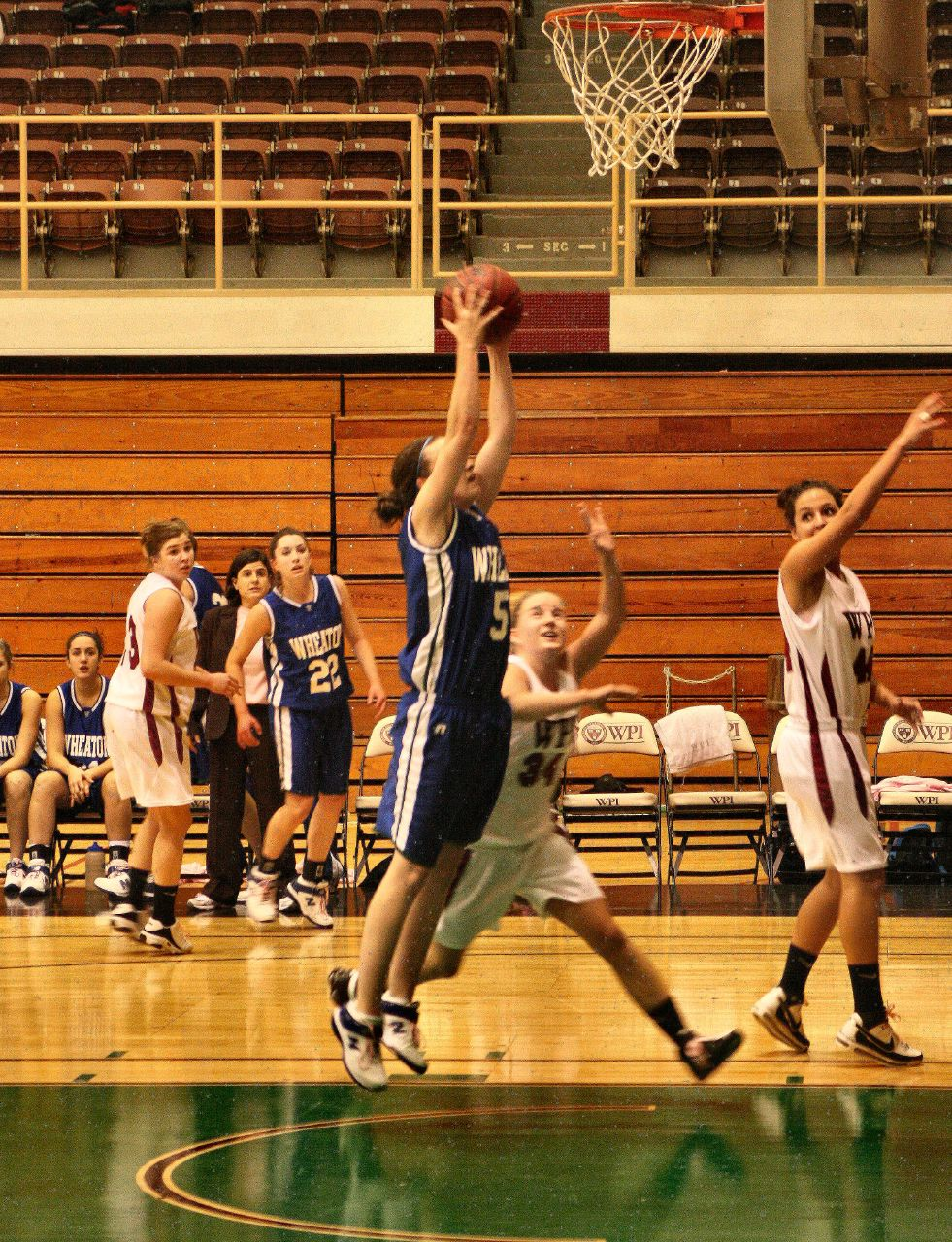
Wheaton Lyons women's basketball team (in blue) v the WPI Engineers

Men's sports	Women's sports
Baseball	Artistic swimming
Basketball	Basketball
Cross country	Cross country
Fencing	Fencing
Lacrosse	Field hockey
Soccer	Lacrosse
Swimming	Soccer
Tennis	Softball
Track and field^{1}	Swimming
Volleyball	Tennis
Water polo	Track and field^{1}
	Volleyball
	Water polo
^{1} – includes both indoor and outdoor

=== Artistic swimming ===
Wheaton has also had two synchronized swimmers named collegiate swimmer of the year. Gina Lighthall '99 in 1999 and Christiana Butera '12 in 2012. Butera was also member of the U.S. National Synchronized Swimming Team during the summer of 2011.

=== Baseball ===
The last varsity team established at Wheaton was in 1997 in the form of Baseball. The Baseball team also achieved success with the only team sport at Wheaton to advance to a national championship game, which it has done twice (2006 and 2012) in addition to one additional Division III world series (2017). Baseball has also won 14 of the 19 NEWMAC championships in conference history.

Two alums have been in the Major League Baseball (MLB) teams with one being drafted in to the MLB. Chris Denorfia '02 was a 19th round pick in the 2002 Major League Baseball amateur draft by the Cincinnati Reds. Denorfia spent parts of 10 years roaming the outfield for five Major League teams, most recently as a part of the 2015 Chicago Cubs. In the summer of 2014, Mike Gibbons was signed to a professional baseball contract by the New York Mets, making him Wheaton's first student-athlete to sign with a professional team before using all four years of eligibility.

=== Women's golf ===
Deborah Simourian finished in a 72-hole tie for the AIAW individual collegiate golf championship in 1975 before losing a 3-hole playoff.

=== Men's soccer ===
Men's soccer has been to one national semifinal (2003) and two national quarterfinals (2001, 2003) in the NCAA Division III men's soccer championship.

One alum has been drafted into Major League Soccer. Jim Maganello '99 was a second round pick of the NY/NJ Metrostars in the 1999 Major League Soccer draft. In addition, Dan Antoniuk put together a long career in professional soccer, playing with teams like the Portland Timbers and Montreal Impact.

=== Women's soccer ===
Women's soccer advanced to 13 consecutive NCAA tournaments (2000–2012), which was the longest streak in the New England region of Division III women's soccer at that time. During that stretch, the women advanced to one national semifinal (2004) and 3 national quarterfinals (2002, 2003 and 2004).

=== Softball ===
Softball has been to 3 NCAA Division III championship rounds, finishing third twice (1997, 2001) and fifth once (2004).

=== Men's track and field ===
Men's track and field also has been successful, finishing in the top 10 of the NCAA Division III indoor championship seven times, in addition to four top-10 NCAA Division III outdoor championship finishes.

A number of track and field athletes have gone on to professionally train at the World Athletics Center.

=== Women's track and field ===
Wheaton's greatest athletic success has been on the track, as the women's track and field program has claimed 8 NCAA Division III National Championships and finished in the top 3 at the NCAA championships 6 other times (twice in indoor and four times in outdoor). Starting in 1999, the women's indoor team won five consecutive titles, while the outdoor team won three straight times from 2001–2003.

Individually, Wheaton has more than 375 all-American performances and 64 individual national championship accolades in school history. Highlighting that list is Amber James '04, who was pivotal during Wheaton's run of winning six consecutive NCAA indoor and outdoor national championships from 2001–03. James, a 17-time national champion and 24-time all-American, was recognized by the NCAA as the greatest female athlete in the 25-year history of the Division III indoor track & field championship in 2009. In addition, she was selected to the U.S. Track & Field and Cross Country Coaches Association (USTFCCCA) Division III Silver Anniversary Team, which commemorated the 25th anniversary of women competing in NCAA outdoor track & field championships. She served as the event representative for the 400-meter dash.

== Club sports ==
Wheaton club sports include ice hockey (men's and women's), rugby union (m/w).
