= Misericordia University =

Catholic university near Dallas, Pennsylvania, US

- Former name: College Misericordia (1924–2007)
- Type: Private university
- Established: September 15, 1924; 102 years ago
- Religious affiliation: Roman Catholic (Sisters of Mercy)
- Academic affiliations: ACCU; NAICU; CIC
- Endowment: $79.1 million (2025)
- President: Daniel J. Myers
- Administrative staff: 257
- Students: 2,202 (fall 2025)
- Undergraduates: 1,775 (fall 2025)
- Postgraduates: 427 (fall 2025)
- Location: Dallas address, Pennsylvania, United States; 41.3451°N 75.9716°W
- Campus: Suburban
- Colors: (Blue & gold)
- Nickname: Cougars
- Sporting affiliations: NCAA Division III – MAC Freedom
- Mascot: Archie McGrowl
- Website: misericordia.edu

Misericordia University is a private Catholic university in the Dallas, Pennsylvania area, United States. It was founded by the Religious Sisters of Mercy in 1924 as College Misericordia; in 2007 it became a university and changed its name. The university offers bachelor's, master's and doctoral degrees as well as post-master's and post-bachelor's certificates.

== History ==
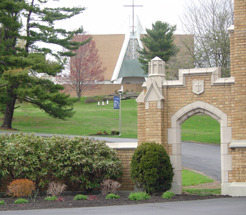
Misericordia University campus during spring

The Religious Sisters of Mercy were of the order of Mercy founded in Dublin in 1831. The Sisters vowed to be of service to the impoverished, sick and uneducated. The Sisters of Mercy came to the Wyoming Valley area of Pennsylvania in 1875, continuing their mission of praying, teaching and caring for the sick. The sisters established a school for children and a night school for adults in the coal mining region.

On September 15, 1924, the Sisters of Mercy established Luzerne County's first four-year institution of higher learning, the College Misericordia, on nearly 100 acres (0.40 km^{2}) of land in Dallas, Pennsylvania, purchased by the sisters for this purpose in 1914. The institution's name comes from the Latin word misericordia, meaning "mercy". When the college opened, it had 37 students.

Misericordia continues to be as a university, a broad-based liberal arts and pre-professional studies institution offering education to those of all faiths. The university has been co-educational since the 1970s and offers graduate programs. Today, Misericordia University is located on the original grounds, but has expanded to 120 acres (0.49 km^{2}), situated in a suburban setting eight miles (13 km) from downtown Wilkes-Barre.

On August 24, 2007, the institution became Misericordia University.

== Campus ==
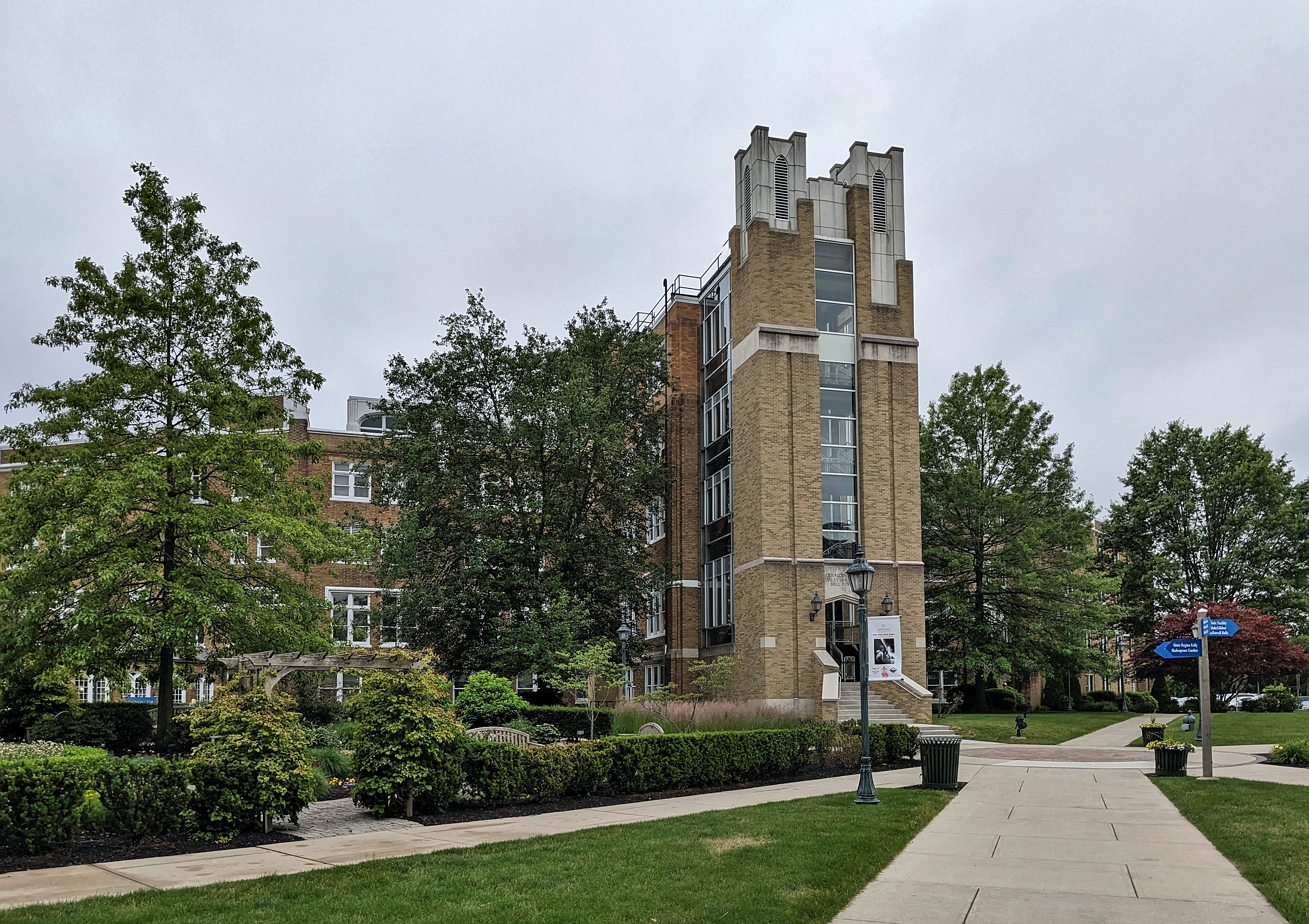
Bell Tower with Shakespeare Garden on left (2023)

The majority of the university grounds, and all of the census-designated place, are in Dallas Township. The university has a small property in Dallas Borough.

Between 2009 and 2021, numerous changes have been added to the campus:

- The Shakespeare Garden: Misericordia University features the only Shakespeare garden in northeast PA and won a 2011 Greening Award from the Pennsylvania Horticultural Society
- Pauly Friedman Art Gallery
- The College of Health Sciences - Passan Hall
- Insalaco Hall
- Metz Field House
- MacDowell Hall
- Gildea Hall
- Alumnae Hall
- McGowan Hall
- McHale Hall
- Frank M. and Dorothea Henry Science Center
- Anderson Sports Center
- Multi-Purpose Dome (2024)

The census-designated place is in the Dallas School District.

== Academics ==
Misericordia gives students a choice of 32 majors in three Academic Colleges:

- College of Arts and Science
- College of Health Sciences and Education
- College of Business

=== Guaranteed Placement Program ===
Misericordia's Guaranteed Placement Program (or GPP) is a development program pertaining to a student's education.

Established in 1999, the GPP assists students entering the workforce or graduate school after graduation. Students participate in the GPP for all four years of their college experience. If they do not receive a job offer or are not accepted into graduate/professional school within six months after graduation, the university gives them a paid internship in their chosen field.

== Student life ==
In 2023, Misericordia University had 41 clubs, service organizations, and special interest organizations.

=== Student Government Association ===
Misericordia's Student Government Association is a student-run, student-elected executive board which represents the students at Misericordia University. Members of the board and delegates represent the students on various college committees. Student Government also is the governing body of the various clubs on campus and keeps records of each club's activities. The Student Government Association is made up of eight members.

==== English Department ====
Instress is the campus' annual literary magazine published each spring. It prints original material by students and members of the university community.

== Athletics ==
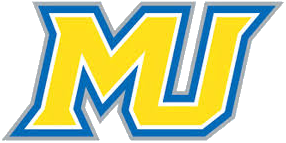
Misericordia athletics mark

Misericordia University teams are nicknamed the Cougars, and currently compete in the NCAA Division III, Eastern College Athletic Conference and the MAC Freedom within the Middle Atlantic Conferences. Women's sports include basketball, soccer, STUNT, field hockey, volleyball, swimming, softball, cross-country, cheerleading, lacrosse, tennis, track and field and wrestling. Men's sports include basketball, football, soccer, swimming, cross-country, baseball, golf, lacrosse, tennis, track and field, volleyball, ice hockey and wrestling.

The Cougars won the 2024 NCAA Division III baseball tournament for their first national championship. The Cougar STUNT program was started in 2024, and qualified for the National Tournament in both 2025 and 2026.

The school has had an athletics program since 1932, when it introduced intramural sports.

== Notable alumni ==
- Karen Boback, member of the Pennsylvania House of Representatives
- Mike Dunleavy, Governor of Alaska
- Jon Ford, member of the Indiana Senate
- Dave Kern, professional soccer player
- Maria Pallante, United States Register of Copyrights
