= Salisbury Sea Gulls baseball =

Salisbury University baseball team

- 2023 Salisbury Sea Gulls baseball team
- Founded: 1964
- University: Salisbury University
- Athletic director: Gerard DiBartolo
- Head coach: Troy Brohawn (9th season)
- Conference: Coast to Coast Athletic Conference; III Division
- Location: Salisbury, Maryland
- Home stadium: Donnie Williams Sea Gull Baseball Stadium (capacity: 500)
- Nickname: Sea Gulls
- Colors: Maroon and gold

College World Series champions
- 2021

College World Series runner-up
- 2022

College World Series appearances
- 2001, 2004, 2011, 2014, 2015, 2021, 2022, 2023, 2026

NCAA regional champions
- 2001, 2004, 2008, 2010, 2011, 2012, 2013, 2014, 2015, 2017, 2021, 2022, 2023, 2024, 2025, 2026

NCAA tournament appearances
- 1977, 1978, 1980, 1981, 1983, 2000, 2001, 2002, 2003, 2004, 2005, 2006, 2007, 2008, 2009, 2010, 2011, 2012, 2013, 2014, 2015, 2016, 2017, 2018, 2019, 2021, 2022, 2023, 2026

Conference regular season champions
- 1995, 2000, 2001, 2002, 2004, 2006, 2007, 2008, 2009, 2012, 2013, 2014, 2016, 2017, 2018, 2021, 2022, 2023, 2025, 2026

The Salisbury Sea Gulls baseball team represents Salisbury University, in Salisbury, Maryland in college baseball. The program is classified in the NCAA Division III, and the team competes in the Coast to Coast Athletic Conference. The team is coached by Troy Brohawn.

The Salisbury baseball team has been to the College World Series seven times, recorded 28 NCAA appearances, and 17 Coast to Coast Championships. They won the College World Series in 2021 and finished as runner-up in 2022.

== Facilities ==
The Sea Gulls play home games at Donnie Williams Sea Gull Baseball Stadium, a 500-seat stadium which has been home to the program since 2018. Previously, the Sea Gulls had played at Henry S. Parker Athletic Complex as well as briefly playing at Arthur W. Perdue Stadium.

== Head coaches ==
Coach	Years	Seasons	Record
Deane Deshon	1964–1997	34	553-446-12
Robb Disbennet	1998–2000	3	74-39-2
Doug Fleetwood	2001–2014	14	467-145-6
Troy Brohawn	2015–present	8	244-70-2

== Individual awards ==
=== Coast to Coast Player of the Year ===
- Jason Ewing (2001)
- Nick Pegelow (2004)
- Justin Armiger (2008)
- Eric Willey (2008)
- Mike Celenza (2009)
- Tom LaBriola (2016)
- Pete Grasso (2017)
- Justin Meekins (2021)
- Clayton Dwyer (2021)
- Kavi Caster (2022)
- Jimmy Adkins (2022)
- Danny Sheeler (2023)

=== Coast to Coast Coach of the Year ===
- Deane Deshone (1995)
- Robb Disbennett (2000)
- Doug Fleetwood (2001-2004, 2006-2009, 2012, 2013)
- Troy Brohawn (2017, 2021, 2022)

=== Coast to Coast Rookie of the Year ===
- Greg Lemon (2003)
- Dustin Herbert (2008)
- Bill Root (2011)
