= Keystone College =

Private college in La Plume, Pennsylvania, US

Coordinates: 41.559°N 75.775°W

- Former names: Keystone Academy (1868–1934); Scranton-Keystone Junior College (1934–1944); Keystone Junior College (1944–1995)
- Motto: Progress Through Effort
- Type: Private college
- Established: 1868; 158 years ago (as academy); 1934; 92 years ago (as college)
- Endowment: $8 million
- President: John F. Pullo, Sr.
- Academic staff: 43 FT/ 90 PT
- Students: 1051 (2023)
- Undergraduates: 978 (2023)
- Postgraduates: 73 (2023)
- Location: La Plume and Factoryville, Pennsylvania, United States
- Campus: 276 acres (112 ha)
- Colors: Blue and orange
- Nickname: Giants
- Website: keystone.edu
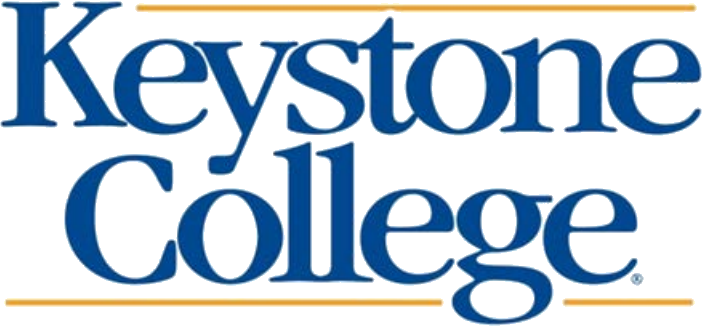

Keystone College is a private college in northeastern Pennsylvania, United States. Although the college's official mailing address is La Plume, Pennsylvania in Lackawanna County, much of the campus is in Factoryville in Wyoming County. It was founded in 1868 and enrolls approximately 1,200 students in around 40 undergraduate and graduate degree programs. In November 2024, following over a decade of enrollment and revenue decreases, the college's accreditor, by the Middle States Commission on Higher Education (MSCHE), planned to withdraw its accreditation, but the decision on an exact withdrawal date is now subject to an appeal.

== History ==
"Keystone Academy" was founded in 1868 by John Howard Harris. The academy was originally chartered by the Commonwealth of Pennsylvania in 1868, with instruction beginning the following year in the local Baptist church in Factoryville. At the time it was chartered, Keystone Academy was the only high school between Binghamton, New York and Scranton, Pennsylvania. Louis Arthur Watres was a longtime trustee of Keystone Military Academy, and was one of the leaders who transformed the school into "Scranton-Keystone Junior College" in 1934. Laurence Hawley Watres succeeded his father as a trustee, and remained on the board until 1962, when he was designated a trustee emeritus. In 1944, the name was shortened to "Keystone Junior College". The current name Keystone College was adopted in 1995.

In 1998, the school received approval from the Pennsylvania Department of Education to offer baccalaureate degree programs. In 2014, Keystone received approval to offer master's degrees.

In 2012 the college enrolled 1,683 students but a decade later it enrolled only 1,131 students.

=== Middle States issues ===
In early 2024, the college explored a merger with the Washington Institute for Education and Research (WIER), a Washington, D.C. non-profit organization, but the deal fell apart. Shortly thereafter, the college's accreditor, the Middle States Commission on Higher Education (MSCHE), issued the college a "show-cause order," requiring the college to prove compliance with its accreditation standards by August 1 or have its accreditation withdrawn. The college has already provided MSCHE with a teach-out plan that described how students can complete their degree programs if the college closes. On June 25, 2024, the college laid off 29 faculty and staff and closed three programs with low enrollments. In August 2024, the college announced it had signed a merger agreement with the Washington Institute for Education and Research, whereby Keystone would become a subsidiary of WIER. In November, the Middle States commission voted to withdraw its accreditation of the college effective December 31, 2024, and pending an appeal by the college. On December 20, 2024, the MSCHE noted that the December 31 deadline was no longer in effect and that the commission would "revise the effective date that accreditation will cease as appropriate based upon the final disposition of the appeal." In the meantime, one of the conditions of the appeal was that Keystone College could not market to, recruit or enroll new students.

In late February 2025, Middle States withdrew their decision to withdraw accreditation and Keystone College remains accredited. Middle States has given the college until September 2025 to provide further data about their long-term financials.

== Campus ==
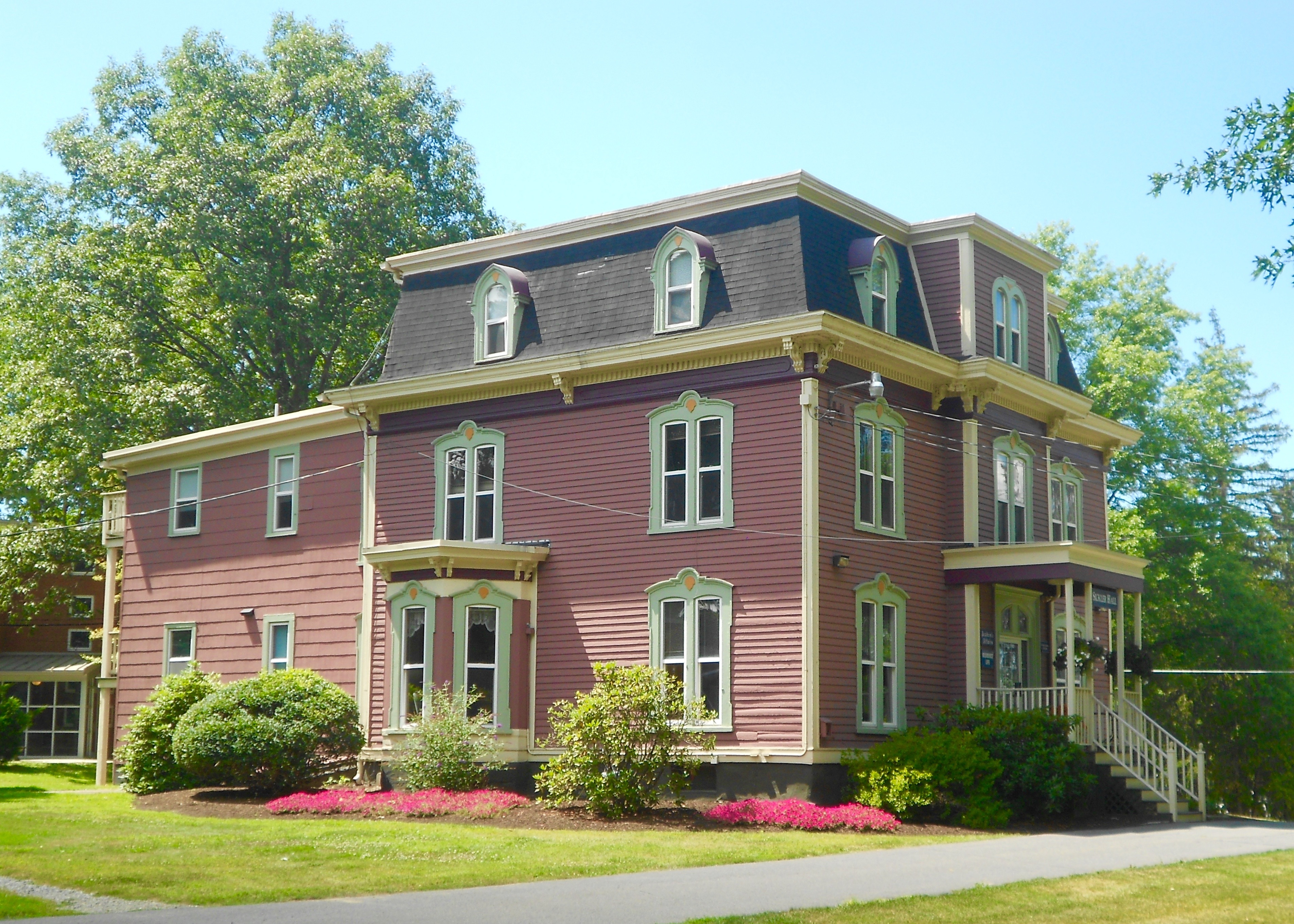
Sickler Hall

Keystone's scenic 276-acre (1.1 km^{2}) campus, located at the gateway to the Endless Mountains of Northeastern Pennsylvania, features hiking trails and a freshwater stream. The campus is 15 miles northwest of Scranton on U.S. Routes 6 and 11, and is located in both Lackawanna and Wyoming counties.

=== Woodlands Campus ===
Keystone's 170-acre Woodlands Campus features approximately seven miles of hiking trails that are open to students and the public seven days a week from dawn until dusk.

== Academics ==
Keystone College offers more than 50 degree options at the undergraduate and graduate levels in several academic divisions within two schools.

- Turock School of Arts and Sciences
  - Communication, Art, and Humanities
  - Biological and Physical Sciences and Mathematics
  - Social and Behavioral Sciences
- School of Professional Studies
  - Business, Management, and Technology
  - Education

== Athletics ==
Keystone athletics logo

Keystone's 16 teams (nicknamed the Giants) compete in the United East Conference as a Division III school under the NCAA. The teams are known as the Giants in honor of alumnus Christy Mathewson who played for the New York Giants baseball team from 1900 to 1916.

=== Men's teams ===
Men's sports teams include baseball, basketball, cross country, football, lacrosse, soccer, track and field, and wrestling.

=== Women's teams ===
Women's sports include basketball, cross country, field hockey, lacrosse, soccer, softball, track and field, and volleyball

== Publications ==
The Key is the student newspaper. The Keystonian is the college magazine for alumni and friends.

== Notable alumni ==
- Sandra Major (class of 1974), member of the Pennsylvania House of Representatives from 1995 to 2017
- Christy Mathewson (class of 1898), professional baseball player and inaugural member of the Baseball Hall of Fame in 1936
- Kate Micucci (class of 2001), actress and musician
- Shay Neary (class of 2012), fashion model
- Suzanne Fisher Staples (class of 1965), author and journalist
- Art Wall Jr. (class of 1944), professional golfer and former Masters champion
- Red Wallace (class of 1939), basketball player and coach
