= American Collegiate Athletic Association men's basketball tournament =

- Conference basketball championship
- Sport: Basketball
- Conference: American Collegiate Athletic Association
- Number of teams: 4
- Format: Single-elimination tournament
- Played: 2018–2020
- Most championships: SUNY Delhi (2)
- Official website: ACAA men's basketball

Host stadiums
- Campus arenas (2018–2020)

Host locations
- Campus venues (2018–2020)

The American Collegiate Athletic Association men's basketball tournament was the annual conference basketball championship tournament for the NCAA Division III American Collegiate Athletic Association. The tournament was held annually from the conference's foundation in 2018 until its dissolution after the 2019–20 season. It was a single-elimination tournament and seeding was based on regular season records.

The winner, while declared conference champion, never received an automatic bid to the NCAA Men's Division III Basketball Championship.

== Results ==
Year	Champions	Score	Runner-up	Venue
2018	Pine Manor	62–53	Maine–Presque Isle	Chestnut Hill, MA
2019	SUNY Delhi	77–75	Alfred State	Alfred, NY
2020	SUNY Delhi	94–42	Pine Manor	Delhi, NY

== Championship records ==
School	Finals Record	Finals Appearances	Years
SUNY Delhi	2–0	2	2019, 2020
Pine Manor	1–1	2	2018
Alfred State	0–1	1	
Maine–Presque Isle	0–1	1	

- Schools highlighted in pink departed the ACAA before its dissolution.
- UC Santa Cruz, Finlandia, Pratt, SUNY Canton, Thomas More, and Valley Forage never qualified for the finals as ACAA members
