= Atlantic Women's Colleges Conference =

Former college athletics conference

The Atlantic Women's Colleges Conference was an eight-member college athletics conference founded in 1995 and given official status in 1999. It competed in NCAA Division III and as its name implies, only offered championships in women's sports. In the conference's later years, several of its members finally became co-educational. Following the 2006–07 season, these members, seeking homes for their newly created men's athletic programs departed for other conferences. Other members also switched affiliations, leaving the conference without enough members to be officially sanctioned. Following the 2007 spring season, the conference ceased operations as some of its members struggled with enrollment, and thus opted for co-education.

== Member schools ==
=== Final members ===
Institution	Location	Founded	Affiliation	Enrollment	Joined (Note: Represents the calendar year when fall sports competition begins.)	Left (Note: Represents the calendar year when spring sports competition ends.)	Nickname	Subsequent conference(s)	Current conference(s)
Chatham University (Note: This institution is a former women's college, which has eventually turned into a co-educational college (Hood since 2002–03, Chestnut Hill since 2003–04, Wells since 2005–06, Wilson since 2013–14, Chatham since 2014–15, Mary Baldwin since 2017–18, and Notre Dame (Md.) since 2023–24).)	Pittsburgh, Pennsylvania	1869	Nonsectarian	2,300	1995	2007	Cougars	Presidents' (PAC) (2007–present)	
Chestnut Hill College	Philadelphia, Pennsylvania	1924	Catholic (S.S.J.)	2,301	1995	2007	Griffins	Central Atlantic (CACC) (Note: Currently an NCAA Division II athletic conference.) (2007–present)	
Hood College	Frederick, Maryland	1893	U.C.C.	2,422	1995	2007	Blazers	Capital (CAC) (2007–12)	MAC Commonwealth (2012–present)
Mary Baldwin College	Staunton, Virginia	1869	Presbyterian	2,542	1995	2007	Fighting; Squirrels	USA South (2007–present)	
Notre Dame of Maryland University	Baltimore, Maryland	1873	Catholic (S.S.N.D.)	2,901	1995	2007	Gators	Colonial States (CSAC) (2007–23)	United East (UEC) (2023–present)
Trinity Washington University	Washington, D.C.	1897	Catholic (SNDdeN)	2,100	1995	2007	Tigers	D-III Independent (2007–12); Great South (GSAC) (2012–15)	D-III Independent (2015–present)
Wells College	Aurora, New York	1868	Nonsectarian	480	1995	2007	Express	United East (UEC) (2007–23); Allegheny Mountain (AMCC) (2023–24)	Closed in 2024
Wilson College	Chambersburg, Pennsylvania	1869	Presbyterian	800	1995	2007	Phoenix	North Eastern (NEAC) (2007–18); Colonial States (CSAC) (2018–23)	United East (UEC) (2023–present)

=== Membership timeline ===
Full member (all sports) Full member (non-football) Associate member (football) Associate member (sport)

== Championships offered ==
- Basketball
- Field hockey
- Lacrosse
- Soccer
- Softball
- Swimming
- Tennis
- Volleyball
