= New York State Agricultural and Technical Institute =

New York State Agricultural and Technical Institute may refer to one of several public universities from New York, all of which were formerly known by that name and are now members of the State University of New York system:

== Schools ==
- Alfred State College, known as the New York State Agricultural and Technical Institute at Alfred from 1941 to 1964
- SUNY Canton, named New York State Agricultural and Technical Institute at Canton from 1941 to 1964
- SUNY Delhi, named New York State Agricultural and Technical Institute at Delhi from 1941 to 1964
