= Great South Athletic Conference =

Defunct NCAA Division III athletic conference

- Conference: NCAA
- Founded: 1999
- Folded: 2016
- Sports fielded: 6; men's: 0; women's: 6
- Division: Division III
- No. of teams: 5
- Headquarters: Decatur, Georgia
- Region: Southeast

Locations
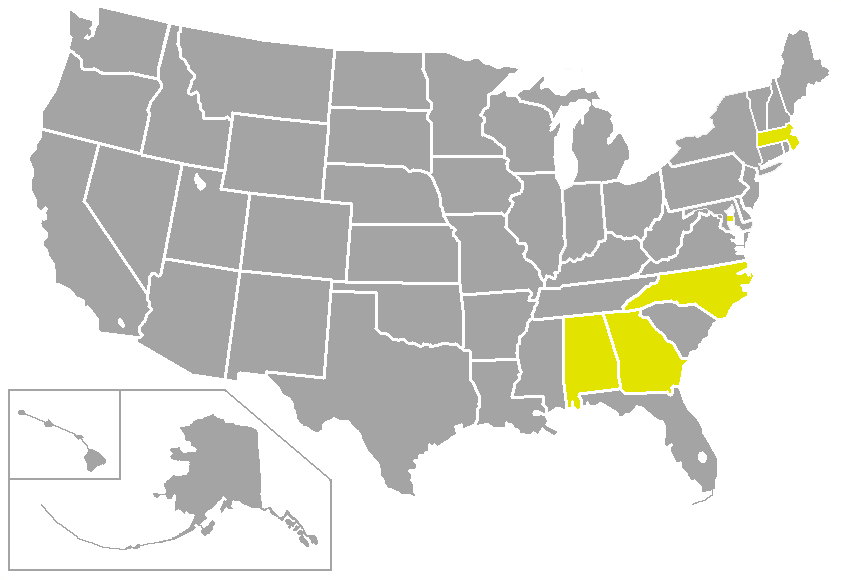

The Great South Athletic Conference (GSAC) was an intercollegiate athletic conference affiliated with the NCAA’s Division III. Member institutions were located nationwide, but was originally based in the southeastern United States.

== History ==
The Great South Athletic Conference was founded in 1999 as a group of National Collegiate Athletic Association (NCAA) Division III member institutions from the Southeast with similar academic and athletic interests. Charter members included Fisk University, LaGrange College, Maryville College, Piedmont College and Stillman College. In 2002, Huntingdon College and women’s colleges Agnes Scott College and Wesleyan College were granted membership. In 2003, Spelman College and Wesleyan (Ga.) were admitted to the GSAC on a provisional basis and given full membership status in 2005. Salem College, a women’s school in Winston-Salem, North Carolina, became the conference’s eighth member for the 2009-10 season. Covenant College, located on top of Lookout Mountain in northwest Georgia, joined the conference in spring 2010 and began playing in fall 2010, while completing its requirements for NCAA Division III provisional status. Stillman, a charter member, dropped out of the conference following the 2001-02 season, who would later compete in the NCAA Division II Southern Intercollegiate Athletic Conference (SIAC) (now currently competing in the Gulf Coast Athletic Conference (GCAC, now known as the HBCU Athletic Conference (HBCUAC) as of 2024) of the National Association of Intercollegiate Athletics (NAIA) in 2010-11); while Fisk, another charter member, dropped out of the conference following the 2005-06 season, to join the NAIA (and eventually compete in the GCAC).

Three schools (also charter members of the GSAC) left for the USA South Athletic Conference (USA South) beginning with the 2012–13 season: Piedmont, LaGrange and Maryville. Pine Manor College and Trinity Washington University joined the conference in the 2012–13 season to replace those schools. Due to the lack of men's athletic programs in the GSAC, the conference stopped sponsoring men's sports championships at the end of the 2011–12 season.

On May 10, 2012, Covenant College and Huntingdon College announced plans to leave the Great South and join USA South Athletic Conference beginning in the 2013–14 season. In the 2012–13 season, the Covenant and Huntingdon women's sports competed as full members of the GSAC, while their men's sports competed as NCAA Division III independents.

On November 1, 2012, Spelman College announced that they would be dropping all intercollegiate sports at the end of the 2012–13 academic year.

On January 14, 2013, the GSAC announced that Mills College, Finlandia University, and the University of Maine at Presque Isle would join the GSAC in the 2013–14 season. Finlandia and Maine–Presque Isle are co-educational colleges. The women's sports joined the GSAC, while the men's sports at the two schools remained Division III Independents.

On May 6, 2015, the USA South Athletic Conference announced that Agnes Scott College, Salem College, and Wesleyan College would be leaving the GSAC and joining the USA South beginning in the 2016-2017 season.

On June 11, 2015, the GSAC announced that Mount Mary University and UC Santa Cruz would be joining the conference in women's soccer, volleyball, women's basketball, softball (Mount Mary only) and tennis (UC Santa Cruz only). The move was made effective immediately. Both schools were formerly affiliate members, playing tennis in the GSAC since 2013.

Following the move of Agnes Scott, Salem, and Wesleyan to the USA South, the GSAC dissolved in the summer of 2016. The GSAC held its last conference championships in April 2016.

=== Chronological timeline ===
- 1999 – The Great South Athletic Conference (GSAC) was founded. Charter members included Fisk University, LaGrange College, Maryville College, Piedmont College and Stillman College, beginning the 1999–2000 academic year.
- 2002:
  - Stillman left the GSAC to join the Division II ranks of the National Collegiate Athletic Association (NCAA) and the Southern Intercollegiate Athletic Conference (SIAC) after the 2001–02 academic year.
  - Agnes Scott College and Huntingdon College joined the GSAC in the 2002–03 academic year.
- 2003 – Spelman College and Wesleyan College joined the GSAC as provisional members in the 2003–04 academic year.
- 2006 – Fisk left the GSAC to join the National Association of Intercollegiate Athletics (NAIA) as an Independent (which would later join the Gulf Coast Athletic Conference (GCAC), beginning the 2010–11 school year) after the 2005–06 academic year.
- 2009 – Salem College joined the GSAC in the 2009–10 academic year.
- 2010 – Covenant College joined the GSAC in the 2010–11 academic year.
- 2012:
  - LaGrange, Maryville and Piedmont left the GSAC to join the USA South Athletic Conference (USA South) after the 2011–12 academic year.
  - Due to lack of finding possible candidate schools with men's athletics programs, the GSAC was forced to drop men's sports, thus becoming a women's sports athletic conference, beginning the 2012–13 academic year. Co-ed schools Covenant and Huntingdon remained in the GSAC for women's sports, while their men's sports went to compete as NCAA D-III Independents.
  - Pine Manor College and Trinity Washington University joined the GSAC in the 2012–13 academic year.
  - Finlandia University joined the GSAC as an affiliate member for softball in the 2013 spring season (2012–13 academic year).
- 2013:
  - Three institutions left the GSAC to join their respective new home primary conferences, all effective after the 2012–13 academic year:
    - Covenant and Huntingdon to align with their respective men's athletics programs and join the USA South
    - and Spelman to discontinue its athletic program as the school announced that it would cease operations
  - The University of Maine at Presque Isle (Maine–Presque Isle or UMPI) and Mills College (with Finlandia upgrading to join for all sports) joined the GSAC in the 2013–14 academic year. Only Finlandia and Maine–Presque Isle (UMPI) were the co-educational schools whose men's sports still competed as NCAA D-III Independents.
  - Rust College joined the GSAC as an affiliate member for softball in the 2014 spring season (2013–14 academic year).
- 2014 – Mount Mary University and the University of California, Santa Cruz (UC Santa Cruz or UCSC) joined the GSAC as affiliate members for women's tennis in the 2015 spring season (2014–15 academic year).
- 2015:
  - Maine–Presque Isle (UMPI) and Trinity Washington left the GSAC to become NCAA D-III Independents after the 2014–15 academic year.
  - Rust left the GSAC as an affiliate member for softball after the 2015 spring season (2014–15 academic year).
  - Mount Mary and UC Santa Cruz (UCSC) had upgraded to join the GSAC for all sports in the 2015–16 academic year.
- 2016 – The GSAC ceased operations as an athletic conference at the end of the 2015–16 academic year; as many schools left to join their respective new home primary conferences, beginning the 2016–17 academic year:
  - Agnes Scott, Salem (N.C.) and Wesleyan (Ga.) joined the USA South
  - while Finlandia, Mills, Mount Mary, Pine Manor and UC Santa Cruz returned to become NCAA D-III Independents

== Member schools ==
=== Full members ===
==== Final members ====
The GSAC had eight final full members before the conference dissolved, all but one were private schools:

Institution	Location	Founded	Affiliation	Enrollment	Nickname	Joined (Note: Represents the calendar year when fall sports competition begins.)	Left (Note: Represents the calendar year when spring sports competition ends.)	Subsequent conference	Current conference
Agnes Scott College (Note: This institution is a women's college, therefore it does not compete in men's sports.)	Decatur, Georgia	1889	Presbyterian (PCUSA)	914	Scottish; Terriers	2002	2016	USA South (2016–22)	C.C. South (CCS) (2022–present)
Finlandia University (Note: This institution, which closed in 2023, was a co-educational college. Co-educational colleges competed in both men's and women's competitions until the end of the 2011–12 school year. From 2012–13 until 2015–16, all schools competed only in women's competitions in the GSAC.) (Note: During their tenure in the GSAC for women's sports, their men's programs competed as NCAA D-III Independents.) (Note: Finlandia was an associate member of the GSAC for softball during the 2013 spring season (2012–13 school year).)	Hancock, Michigan	1896	Lutheran ELCA	507	Lions	2013	2016	Various (Note: Finlandia had joined the following subsequent conferences: as an NCAA D-III Independent during the 2016–17 school year; the American Collegiate Athletic Association (ACAA) from 2017–18 to 2019–20; and the Coast to Coast Athletic Conference (C2C) from 2020–21 to 2022–23.)	N/A (Note: Finlandia closed at the end of the 2022–23 school year.)
Mills College	Oakland, California	1854	Nonsectarian	1,345	Cyclones	2013	2016	Various (Note: Mills had joined the following subsequent conferences: as an NCAA D-III Independent during the 2016–17 school year; the American Collegiate Athletic Association (ACAA) from 2017–18 to 2019–20; and the Coast to Coast Athletic Conference (C2C) from 2020–21 to 2021–22.)	N/A (Note: Mills was merged into Northeastern University in 2022 to become a research institution; therefore it discontinued its athletics program after the 2021–22 school year.)
Mount Mary University (Note: UC Santa Cruz and Mount Mary were affiliate members of the GSAC for women's tennis during the 2015 spring season (2014–15 school year).)	Milwaukee, Wisconsin	1913	Catholic (SSND)	1,209	Blue Angels	2015	2016	Various (Note: Mount Mary had joined the following subsequent conferences: as an NCAA D-III Independent from 2016–17 to 2017–18; the American Collegiate Athletic Association (ACAA) from 2018–19 to 2019–20; and the Coast to Coast Athletic Conference (C2C) from 2020–21 to 2024–25.)	Chicagoland (CCAC) (Note: Currently an NAIA athletic conference.) (2025–present)
Pine Manor College (Note: This institution is a former women's college, which would later turn into a co-educational college (Pine Manor from 2014–15 until absorption by Boston College in 2021).)	Chestnut Hill, Massachusetts	1911	Nonsectarian	N/A	Gators	2012	2016	Various (Note: Pine Manor had joined the following subsequent conferences: as an NCAA D-III Independent during the 2016–17 school year; the American Collegiate Athletic Association (ACAA) from 2017–18 to 2019–20; and the Coast to Coast Athletic Conference (C2C) during the 2020–21 school year.)	N/A (Note: Pine Manor was merged into Boston College in 2021; therefore the school discontinued its athletics program and later closed.)
Salem College	Winston-Salem, North Carolina	1772	Moravian	565	Spirits	2009	2016	USA South (2016–present)	
University of California, Santa Cruz	Santa Cruz, California	1965	Public	19,700	Banana; Slugs	2015	2016	D-III Independent (2016–19); American (ACAA) (2019–20)	Coast to Coast (C2C) (2020–present)
Wesleyan College	Macon, Georgia	1839	United; Methodist	550	Wolves	2003	2016	USA South (2016–22)	C.C. South (CCS) (2022–26) (Southern States (SSAC) in 2026)

==== Former members ====
The GSAC had ten other former full members during the conference's existence, all but one were private schools:

Institution	Location	Founded	Affiliation	Enrollment	Nickname	Joined (Note: Represents the calendar year when fall sports competition begins.)	Left (Note: Represents the calendar year when spring sports competition ends.)	Subsequent conference	Current conference
Covenant College (Note: This institution is a co-educational college. Co-educational colleges competed in both men's and women's competitions until the end of the 2011–12 school year. From 2012–13 until 2015–16, all schools competed only in women's competitions in the GSAC.) (Note: Covenant and Huntingdon remained in the GSAC for women's sports during the 2012–13 school year, while their men's sports competed as NCAA D-III Independents, before joining the USA South Athletic Conference (USA South) since the 2013–14 school year.)	Lookout Mountain, Georgia	1955	Presbyterian (PCA)	1,282	Scots & Lady Scots	2010	2013	USA South (2013–22)	C.C. South (CCS) (2022–present)
Fisk University	Nashville, Tennessee	1866	U.C.C.	910	Bulldogs	1999	2006	D-III Independent (2006–09); NAIA Independent (2009–10; 2014–21)	HBCU (HBCUAC) (Note: Currently an NAIA athletic conference.) (2010–14; 2021–present)
Huntingdon College	Montgomery, Alabama	1854	United; Methodist	900	Hawks	2002	2013	USA South (2013–22)	C.C. South (CCS) (2022–present)
LaGrange College	LaGrange, Georgia	1831	United; Methodist	1,137	Panthers	1999	2012	USA South (2012–22)	C.C. South (CCS) (2022–present)
University of Maine at Presque Isle (Note: During their tenure in the GSAC for women's sports, their men's programs remained competing as NCAA D-III Independents.)	Presque Isle, Maine	1903	Public	1,469	Owls	2013	2015	D-III Independent (2015–17); American (ACAA) (2017–18)	North Atlantic (NAC) (2018–present)
Maryville College	Maryville, Tennessee	1819	Presbyterian (PCUSA)	1,103	Scots	1999	2012	USA South (2012–22)	C.C. South (CCS) (2022–26) (Southern (SAA) in 2026)
Piedmont College	Demorest, Georgia	1897	U.C.C. & N.A.C.C.C.	2,640	Lions	1999	2012	USA South (2012–22)	C.C. South (CCS) (2022–present)
Spelman College (Note: This institution is a women's college, therefore it does not compete in men's sports.)	Atlanta, Georgia	1881	Nonsectarian	N/A	Jaguars	2004	2012	N/A (Note: Spelman dropped its athletics program after the 2012–13 school year.)	
Stillman College	Tuscaloosa, Alabama	1876	Presbyterian (PCUSA)	1,000	Tigers	1999	2002	Various (Note: Stillman had joined the following subsequent conferences: Southern Intercollegiate Athletic Conference (Note: Currently an NCAA Division II athletic conference.) (SIAC) from 2002–03 to 2015–16; as an NAIA Independent within the Association of Independent Institutions (AII) from 2016–17 to 2017–18; and the Southern States Athletic Conference (SSAC) from 2018–19 to 2023–24.)	HBCU (HBCUAC) (2024–present)
Trinity Washington University	Washington, D.C.	1897	Catholic (SNDdeN)	2,100	Tigers	2012	2015	D-III Independent (2015–present)	

=== Former affiliate members ===
The GSAC had one former affiliate member that did not later become a full member during the conference's existence, which was also a private school:

Institution	Location	Founded	Affiliation	Enrollment	Nickname	Joined (Note: Represents the calendar year when fall sports competition begins.)	Left (Note: Represents the calendar year when spring sports competition ends.)	GSAC sport(s)	Primary conference
Rust College	Holly Springs, Mississippi	1866	United; Methodist	900	Bearcats	2013	2015	Softball	HBCU (HBCUAC) (Note: Currently an NAIA athletic conference.) (Note: During their tenure as an affiliate member of the GSAC, Rust's primary home conference was being an NCAA D-III Independent until the 2014–15 school year.)

=== Membership timeline ===
Full member (all sports) Full member (non-football) Associate member (football) Associate member (sport)

== Sports ==
From the 2012–13 to 2015–16 academic years, the GSAC sponsored intercollegiate athletic competition in women's sports only: basketball, cross country, soccer, softball, tennis, golf, and volleyball.
