= Teachers and Reform =

2008 labor history book by John F. Lyons

Teachers and Reform: Chicago Public Education, 1929–1970
- Author: John F. Lyons
- Language: English
- Subject: Labor history
- Publisher: University of Illinois Press
- Publication date: 2008
- Publication place: United States
- Pages: xiv, 287
- ISBN: 978-0-252-03272-1
- LC Class: LA269.C4 L96 2008

Teachers and Reform: Chicago Public Education, 1929–1970 is a 2008 book by John F. Lyons, published by University of Illinois Press, which traces the development of the Chicago Teachers Union (CTU) during that time period.

The author argues that, in the words of Maurice Berube of Old Dominion University, that improving society in general and the school system in particular as well as "the desire for bread-and butter gains through organizing" were the two major aspects driving the CTU. According to Linda Marie Bos of Mount Mary College, the "fundamental theme" of Teachers and Reform consists of the ties between the teachers' unions and the teachers themselves.

== Contents ==
Linda Marie Bos stated that the emphases of the book are the Great Depression, World War II, the McCarthyism movement, and the Civil Rights Movement. According to Bos, the inclusion of the intersectional relationship between Civil Rights reform in race and gender and worker's rights, including collective bargaining, means that Teachers and Reform "extends the scholarship of the civil rights period".

The book has a chapter at the end "Teacher Power and Black Power reform the system," which describes racial tensions in the CTU and its relationship with the Black Power movement; the CTU ultimately supported adding African-American studies to curricula and the hiring of additional African-American school administrators and school principals.

Bos added that the inclusion of the stories of individual teachers "personalizes" the book.

== Reception ==
Linda Marie Bos described it as a "well-researched study".

Maurice Berube described it as a "masterful scholarly study" and a "balanced, lucid, and insightful analysis". Berube had been an employee of the United Federation of Teachers in New York City during the 1960s and had worked on a Black Power initiative to change the power structure of that city's public school system, and therefore Berube stated "In short, my experience and scholarship parallel that of Lyons’s study which strongly resonates with me."
