= Donna Ricco =

American fashion designer

Donna Ricco is an American fashion designer who heads a company of the same name.

Ricco was born and raised in Milwaukee, and studied Fine Arts at the University of Wisconsin–Milwaukee for three years before transferring to the fashion department of neighboring Mount Mary College. After graduation, she and her business partner and future husband moved to New York City and launched the Donna Ricco label.

== Company ==
Over the next 20 years, the company developed into a successful dress business distributed at department stores such as Nordstrom and Macy’s as well as directly from the Donna Ricco website. Ricco designs under two labels: Donna Ricco New York, a line of dresses; and Donna Ricco Collection, a higher-end line of dresses and separates. Ricco's dresses acquired a reputation for affordable fashion.

== Michelle Obama ==
In June 2008 Michelle Obama, wife of U.S. presidential candidate Barack Obama wore an off the rack Donna Ricco dress while co-hosting the TV program The View. This selection attracted attention from the non-fashion news media, garnering the designer a degree of fame (and a sudden surge in sales).

== Personal life ==
Ricco splits her time between her home in Long Island, NY and her alma mater Mount Mary University, where she is now an executive fellow. Her three adult sons, Marshall, Cooper, and Dexter H. currently reside in Texas, New York, and Vermont, respectively.
