= American Collegiate Athletic Association =

Defunct NCAA Division III athletic conference

- Conference: NCAA
- Founded: 2017
- Folded: 2020 (merged with Capital Athletic Conference)
- Sports fielded: 8
- Division: Division III
- No. of teams: 7
- Region: Northeastern United States, Great Lakes region, California

Locations
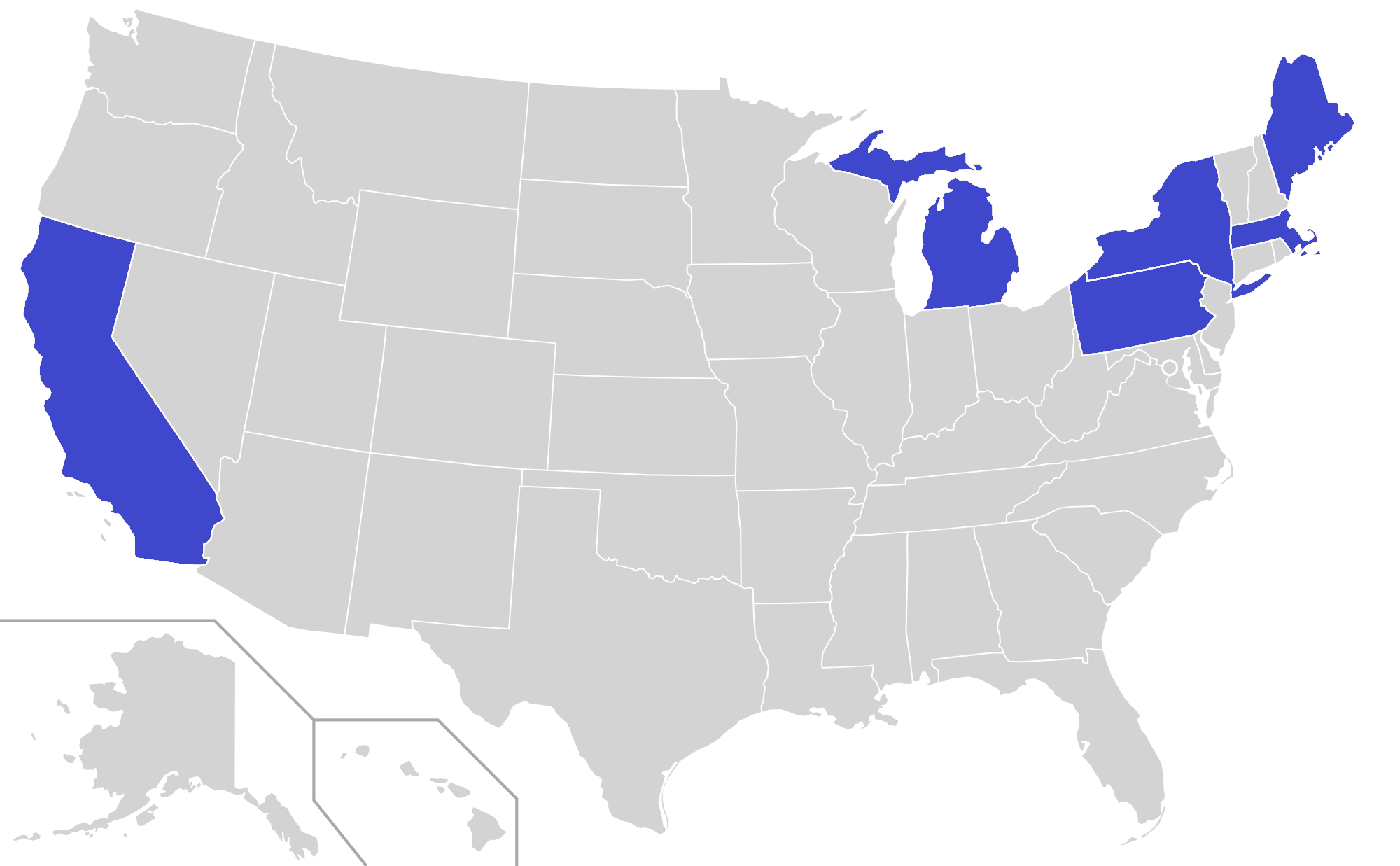

The American Collegiate Athletic Association (ACAA) was an athletic conference with no regular-season competition. The ACAA competed in the NCAA's Division III. The conference was formed in 2017 primarily by Independent schools in the Northeastern United States, but also had members in Michigan, Wisconsin, and California. The members of the ACAA merged with the Capital Athletic Conference in 2020.

== History ==
The ACAA was formally announced as an NCAA Division III athletic conference in February 2017, with plans to start offering official conference championships in the 2017–18 academic year. Unofficial championships were held during the 2016–17 season. Initial members were Alfred State College, Finlandia University, Mills College, State University of New York at Canton, State University of New York at Delhi, Pine Manor College, University of Maine at Presque Isle, and University of Valley Forge. Finlandia, Maine–Presque Isle, Mills, and Pine Manor were formerly members of the women's sports-sponsoring Great South Athletic Conference (GSAC), which disbanded after the 2015–16 season.

In November 2017, it was announced that SUNY Canton and UMPI departed the ACAA, effective July 1, 2018, and would join the North Atlantic Conference (NAC).

In January 2018, it was announced that Mount Mary University of Wisconsin joined the ACAA, effective in the 2018–19 academic year. Mount Mary was formerly an NCAA Division III independent school.

On February 16, 2018, Pratt Institute announced that the college also joined the ACAA, effective in the 2018-19 academic year. Pratt was a member of the Hudson Valley Intercollegiate Athletic Conference (HVIAC) within the United States Collegiate Athletic Association (USCAA).

On June 28, 2018, it was announced that Alfred State College was leaving the ACAA, and joined the Allegheny Mountain Collegiate Conference (AMCC), effective in the 2019–20 school year.

In July 2018, it was announced that Thomas More College, now known as Thomas More University, joined the ACAA effective immediately for the 2018–19 season. Thomas More was previously a full member of the Presidents' Athletic Conference. Thomas More had re-joined the National Association of Intercollegiate Athletics (NAIA) and joined the Mid South Conference beginning the fall of 2019.

On November 30, 2018, SUNY Delhi, a North Atlantic Conference associate member in six sports (men's golf, men's lacrosse, men's and women's tennis, and men's and women's track & field), announced that it would leave the ACAA and become a full member of the NAC effective in the fall of 2019. At that time, five additional Delhi sports—men's and women's cross country, men's golf, men's and women's soccer, and women's volleyball—were about to begin NAC play. Three more sports—men's and women's basketball, plus softball—remained in the ACAA until starting NAC play in 2020–21.

On June 6, 2019, it was announced that the University of Valley Forge was leaving the ACAA, and joined the Colonial States Athletic Conference (CSAC), effective in the 2020–21 season.

On July 11, 2019, it was announced that the University of California, Santa Cruz would be joining the ACAA in seven sports, effective 2019-20.

On May 26, 2020, it was announced that the American Collegiate Athletic Association would merge with the Capital Athletic Conference (CAC), later renamed the Coast to Coast Athletic Conference (C2C). The ACAA will have all of its full members join the CAC in the 2020–21 school year. Pine Manor College, which recently entered into a partnership with Boston College, will participate in the Conference for one academic year in four sports: men's soccer, men's basketball, women's basketball and baseball. After being acquired by Boston College, Pine Manor dissolved their athletics programs effective after the 2020-21 academic year.

=== Chronological timeline ===
- 2017 - The American Collegiate Athletic Association (ACAA) was founded. Charter members included Alfred State College, Finlandia University, the University of Maine at Presque Isle (UMPI), Mills College, Pine Manor College, the State University of New York at Canton (SUNY Canton), the State University of New York at Delhi (SUNY Delhi) and the University of Valley Forge, effective beginning the 2017-18 academic year.
- 2018 - Maine–Presque Isle (UMPI) and SUNY Canton left the ACAA to join the North Atlantic Conference (NAC), effective after the 2017-18 academic year.
- 2018 - Mount Mary University, Pratt Institute and Thomas More University joined the ACAA, effective in the 2018-19 academic year.
- 2019 - Two institutions left the ACAA to join their respective new home primary conferences: Alfred State to join the Allegheny Mountain Collegiate Conference (AMCC), and Thomas More to join the Mid-South Conference (MSC) of the National Association of Intercollegiate Athletics (NAIA), both effective after the 2018-19 academic year.
- 2019 - SUNY Delhi left the ACAA to join the NAC, while remaining in the conference for some sports as an affiliate member (men's & women's basketball and softball), effective after the 2018-19 academic year.
- 2019 - The University of California, Santa Cruz (UC Santa Cruz) joined the ACAA, effective in the 2019-20 academic year.
- 2019 - The University of Wisconsin–Whitewater joined the ACAA as an affiliate member for men's soccer, effective in the 2019 fall season (2019-20 academic year).
- 2020 - Valley Forge left the ACAA to join the Colonial States Athletic Conference (CSAC), effective after the 2019-20 academic year.
- 2020 - The ACAA ceased operations as an athletic conference, effective after the 2019-20 academic year; as the remaining schools (excluding full member Valley Forge and including men's soccer affiliate Wisconsin–Whitewater) were merged with those from the Capital Athletic Conference (CAC) to form the Coast to Coast Athletic Conference (C2C), effective beginning the 2020-21 academic year.

== Member schools ==
=== Final members ===
The ACAA had seven full members in the conference's final season, all but one were private schools:

| Institution | Location | Founded | Affiliation | Enrollment (2016) | Nickname | Joined | Left | Subsequent conference | Current conference |
|---|---|---|---|---|---|---|---|---|---|
| Finlandia University | Hancock, Michigan | 1896 | Lutheran ELCA | 507 | Lions | 2017 | 2020 | Coast to Coast (C2C) (2020–23) | N/A (Note: Finlandia closed at the end of the 2022–23 school year) |
| Mills College (Note: This institution was a women's college, therefore it did not compete in men's sports.) | Oakland, California | 1852 | Nonsectarian | 1,345 | Cyclones | 2017 | 2020 | Coast to Coast (C2C) (2020–22) | Discontinued athletics |
| Mount Mary University | Milwaukee, Wisconsin | 1913 | Catholic (SSND) | 1,209 | Blue Angels | 2018 | 2020 | Coast to Coast (C2C) (2020–2025) | Chicagoland (CCAC) (2025–Present) (Note: Currently an NAIA conference.) |
| Pine Manor College | Chestnut Hill, Massachusetts | 1911 | Nonsectarian | 419 | Gators | 2017 | 2020 | Coast to Coast (C2C) (2020–21) | N/A (Note: Pine Manor was acquired by Boston College in 2021.) |
| Pratt Institute | Brooklyn, New York | 1877 | Nonsectarian | 4,829 | Cannoneers | 2018 | 2020 | Coast to Coast (C2C) (2020–present) | |
| University of California, Santa Cruz | Santa Cruz, California | 1965 | Public | 19,700 | Banana Slugs | 2019 | 2020 | Coast to Coast (C2C) (2020–present) | |
| University of Valley Forge | Phoenixville, Pennsylvania | 1939 | Assemblies of God | 877 | Patriots | 2017 | 2020 | Colonial States (CSAC) (2020–present) | |

=== Former members ===
The ACAA had five other full members during the conference's tenure, one was a private school:

| Institution | Location | Founded | Affiliation | Enrollment | Nickname | Joined | Left | Subsequent conference | Current conference |
|---|---|---|---|---|---|---|---|---|---|
| Alfred State College | Alfred, New York | 1908 | Public (Note: Part of the State University of New York System.) | 3,500 | Pioneers | 2017 | 2019 | Allegheny (AMCC) (2019–present) | |
| University of Maine at Presque Isle | Presque Isle, Maine | 1903 | Public (Note: Part of the University of Maine System.) | 1,469 | Owls | 2017 | 2018 | North Atlantic (NAC) (2018–present) | |
| State University of New York at Canton | Canton, New York | 1906 | Public | 3,122 | Roos | 2017 | 2018 | North Atlantic (NAC) (2018–present) | |
| State University of New York at Delhi (Note: SUNY–Delhi remained in the ACAA as an affiliate member for men's & women's basketball and softball during the 2019–20 school year.) | Delhi, New York | 1913 | Public | 3,088 | Broncos | 2017 | 2019 | North Atlantic (NAC) (2019–present) | |
| Thomas More University | Crestview Hills, Kentucky | 1921 | Catholic (Benedictines) | 1,963 | Saints | 2018 | 2019 | Mid-South (MSC) (Note: Currently an NAIA athletic conference.) (2019–23) | Great Midwest (G-MAC) (Note: Currently an NCAA Division II athletic conference.) (2023–present) |

=== Former associate members ===
The ACAA had two associate members during the conference's tenure, both were public schools:

| Institution | Location | Founded | Affiliation | Enrollment | Nickname | Joined | Left | ACAA sport | Current primary conference | Conference in former ACAA sport |
|---|---|---|---|---|---|---|---|---|---|---|
| State University of New York at Delhi (Note: SUNY–Delhi was a full member of the ACAA from 2017–18 to 2018–19.) | Delhi, New York | 1913 | Public | 3,088 | Broncos | 2019–20 | 2019–20 | men's basketball; women's basketball; softball | North Atlantic (NAC) | |
| University of Wisconsin–Whitewater | Whitewater, Wisconsin | 1868 | Public | 11,722 | Warhawks | 2019–20 | 2019–20 | men's soccer | Wisconsin (WIAC) | Coast 2 Coast (C2C) |

== Sports ==
| School | Men's Basketball | Women's Basketball | Men's Cross Country | Women's Cross Country | Men's Soccer | Women's Soccer | Softball | Women's Volleyball | Total sports |
|---|---|---|---|---|---|---|---|---|---|
| Finlandia | ✓ | ✓ | ✓ | ✓ | ✓ | ✓ | ✓ | ✓ | 8 |
| Mills† | | | | ✓ | | ✓ | | ✓ | 3 |
| Mount Mary† | | ✓ | | ✓ | | ✓ | ✓ | ✓ | 5 |
| Pine Manor | ✓ | ✓ | ✓ | ✓ | ✓ | ✓ | ✓ | ✓ | 8 |
| Pratt | ✓ | ✓ | ✓ | ✓ | ✓ | ✓ | | ✓ | 7 |
| Valley Forge | ✓ | ✓ | ✓ | ✓ | ✓ | ✓ | ✓ | ✓ | 8 |
| UCSC | ✓ | ✓ | ✓ | ✓ | ✓ | ✓ | | ✓ | 7 |
| Totals | 5+1 | 6+1 | 5 | 7 | 5+1 | 7 | 4+1 | 7 | 46+4 |

† - Women's college, therefore not competing in men's sports.
