= NCAA Division III independent schools =

NCAA Division III independent schools are four-year institutions that compete in college athletics at the National Collegiate Athletic Association (NCAA) Division III level, but do not belong to an established intercollegiate athletic conference for a particular sport. These schools may however still compete as members of an athletic conference in other sports. A school may also be fully independent, and not belong to any athletic conference for any sport at all. The reason for independent status varies among institutions, but it is frequently because the school's primary athletic conference does not sponsor a particular sport.

== Full independents ==
Division III was created in 1973, at a time when the NCAA included dozens of independent members, plus members of conferences who played as independents in one or more sports. The trend toward consolidating the NCAA membership into conferences began in the late 1970s, and within a decade the number of independent programs declined dramatically. The lists below include only the small number of programs still functioning on an independent basis in recent years.

=== Current members ===
Institution	Location	Founded	Affiliation	Enrollment	Nickname	Joined (Note: Represents the calendar year when fall sports competition begins.)	Football?	Future primary conference
Maranatha Baptist University	Watertown, Wisconsin	1968	Baptist	1,169	Sabercats	2013	No	None

=== Sports ===
==== Men's sponsored sports by school ====
School	Baseball	Basketball	Cross country	Soccer	Volleyball	Total sports
Maranatha Baptist	✓	✓	✓	✓	✓	5

==== Women's sponsored sports by school ====
School	Basketball	Cross country	Soccer	Softball	Volleyball	Total sports
Maranatha Baptist	✓	✓	✓	✓	✓	5

=== Former members ===
Institution	Location	Founded	Affiliation	Enrollment	Nickname	Joined (Note: Represents the calendar year when fall sports competition begins.)	Left (Note: Represents the calendar year when spring sports competition ends.)	FB? (Note: Abbreviation for football.)	Current primary conference
Alfred State College	Alfred, New York	1908	Public (Note: Part of the State University of New York system.)	3,500	Pioneers	2013	2017	Yes	Allegheny Mountain (AMCC)
Alverno College (Note: This institution is a women's college, therefore it does not compete in men's sports.)	Milwaukee, Wisconsin	1887	Catholic (S.S.S.F.)	1,664	Inferno	2000	2004	No	Coast to Coast (C2C)
Asbury University	Wilmore, Kentucky	1890	Christian	1,054	Eagles	2021	2024	No	C.C. South (CCS)
Bard College	Annandale-on- Hudson, New York	1860	Episcopal	1,958	Raptors	1990	2004	No	Liberty (LL)
Berea College	Berea, Kentucky	1855	Christian (Unaffiliated)	1,613	Mountaineers	2014	2017	No	Heartland (HCAC)
Binghamton University	Vestal, New York	1844	Public	17,768	Bearcats	1997	1998	No	America East (AmEC) (Note: Currently an NCAA Division I athletic conference.)
Bluffton University	Bluffton, Ohio	1899	Mennonite	1,094	Beavers	1996	1998	Yes	Heartland (HCAC)
Bob Jones University	Greenville, South Carolina	1927	Nondenominational	2,916	Bruins	2020	2023	No	NCCAA independent
Bryn Athyn College	Bryn Athyn, Pennsylvania	1877	New Church	330	Lions	2013	2014	No	N/A (Note: Bryn Athyn discontinued its athletics program after the 2024–25 school year.)
Cairn University (Note: Cairn was known as Philadelphia Biblical University during its stint as a member. It adopted its current name in 2012.)	Langhorne, Pennsylvania	1913	Nondenominational	2,200	Highlanders	2001	2004	No	United East
Castleton University	Castleton, Vermont	1787	Public (Note: Part of the Vermont State Colleges System.)	2,399	Spartans	1973	2001	Yes	N/A (Note: Castleton was merged into Vermont State University in 2023, assuming the former's membership in the Little East Conference.)
Centenary University	Hackettstown, New Jersey	1867	United Methodist	1,597	Cyclones	1997	2003	No	Atlantic East (AEC)
Chapman University	Orange, California	1861	DoC & UCC	10,001	Panthers	1994	2011	Yes	Southern California (SCIAC)
Chowan University	Murfreesboro, North Carolina	1848	Baptist	981	Hawks	2004	2007	Yes	Carolinas (CC) (Note: Currently an NCAA Division II athletic conference.)
Clarks Summit University (Note: Formerly known as Baptist Bible College & Seminary until 2015, and later known as Summit University of Pennsylvania until 2016.)	Clarks Summit, Pennsylvania	1932	Baptist	1,142	Defenders	1996 (Note: Later achieved provisional member status in the NCAA Division III ranks during the 1998–99 school year, and then full (active) member status in 2003–04.)	2004	No	Closed in 2024
Colorado College	Colorado Springs, Colorado	1874	Nonsectarian	2,266	Tigers	1973	2006	No	Southern (SCAC)
University of Dallas	Irving, Texas	1956	Catholic (Note: Sub-affiliated with the Roman Catholic Diocese of Dallas and the Roman Catholic Diocese of Fort Worth.)	2,538	Crusaders	2001; 2010 (Note: Dallas initially left the independent ranks after the 2007–08 school year to join the North Eastern Athletic Conference (NEAC) in some sports, including basketball. However, they rejoined after two years.)	2008; 2011	No	Southern (SCAC)
Defiance College	Defiance, Ohio	1850	UCC	1,000	Yellow Jackets	1995	1997	Yes	Wolverine–Hoosier (WHAC) (Note: Currently an NAIA athletic conference.)
Farmingdale State College (Note: Also known as the State of University of New York at Farmingdale.)	East Farmingdale, New York	1912	Public	8,162	Rams	2001	2003	No	Skyline
Finlandia University	Hancock, Michigan	1896	Lutheran (ELCA)	507	Lions	2002	2017 (Note: Finlandia participated in the Great South Athletic Conference from the 2013-14 to 2015-16 school years, but only in women's sports. Men's sports remained independent during those school years.)	No	Closed in 2023
Franciscan University of Steubenville	Steubenville, Ohio	1946	Catholic (Franciscan Friars)	2,716	Barons	2007	2008	No	Presidents' (PAC)
Green Mountain College	Poultney, Vermont	1834	United Methodist	N/A	Eagles	2005	2008	No	Closed in 2019
Husson University	Bangor, Maine	1898	Nonsectarian	3,476	Eagles	2001	2003	Yes	North Atlantic (NAC)
Illinois Institute of Technology	Chicago, Illinois	1890	Nonsectarian	2,977	Scarlet Hawks	2013	2018	No	Northern Athletics (NACC)
La Sierra University	Riverside, California	1922	Seventh-day; Adventist	2,199	Golden Eagles	2006	2010	No	Great Southwest (GSAC)
Lancaster Bible College	Lancaster, Pennsylvania	1933	Nondenominational	954	Chargers	2006	2011	No	United East
Lincoln University	Oxford, Pennsylvania	1854	Public	2,650	Lions	1973	2008	Yes	Central (CIAA)
Lyon College	Batesville, Arkansas	1872	Presbyterian (PCUSA)	700	Scots	2022	2023	Yes	St. Louis (SLIAC)
University of Maine at Farmington	Farmington, Maine	1863	Public (Note: Part of the University of Maine System.)	1,861	Beavers	1999	2003	No	North Atlantic (NAC)
University of Maine at Presque Isle (Note: Maine–Presque Isle was also a dual member with the NAIA and the Sunrise Athletic Conference from 2005 to its folding in 2011.)	Presque Isle, Maine	1903	Public	1,469	Owls	2005	2017	No	North Atlantic (NAC)
Meredith College	Raleigh, North Carolina	1891	Nonsectarian	1,990	Avenging; Angels	1986	2007	No	USA South
Mills College	Oakland, California	1852	Nonsectarian	1,345	Cyclones	1994; 2016 (Note: Mills initially left the independent ranks after the 2012–13 school year to join the Great South Athletic Conference (GSAC); however, they rejoined after three years due to the GSAC folding.)	2013; 2017	No	N/A (Note: Mills was acquired by Northeastern University in 2023, becoming part of that university's extended operations in the San Francisco Bay Area. In advance of this, Mills dropped athletics after the 2021–22 school year.)
Milwaukee School of Engineering	Milwaukee, Wisconsin	1903	Nonsectarian	2,122	Raiders	2006	2007	No	Northern Athletics (NACC)
Mississippi University for Women (Note: MUW initially discontinued its athletics program after the 2002-03 school year; however, they restored it before the 2017–18 school year.)	Columbus, Mississippi	1884	Public	2,479	Owls	2019	2023	No	St. Louis (SLIAC)
Mitchell College	New London, Connecticut	1938	Nonsectarian	572	Mariners	2005	2008	No	Great Northeast (GNAC)
Mount Mary University	Milwaukee, Wisconsin	1913	Catholic (SSND)	1,209	Blue Angels	2007; 2016 (Note: Mount Mary initially left the independent ranks after the 2014–15 school year to join the Great South Athletic Conference (GSAC); however, they rejoined after one year due to the GSAC folding.)	2015; 2018	No	Chicagoland (CCAC)
Mount St. Joseph University	Delhi Township, Ohio (Note: The campus mailing address is Cincinnati.)	1920	Catholic (S.C.C.)	1,889	Lions	1996	1998	Yes	Heartland (HCAC)
Nebraska Wesleyan University	Lincoln, Nebraska	1887	United Methodist	1,600	Prairie Wolves	1982 (Note: Nebraska Wesleyan was also a member of the Great Plains Athletic Conference (GPAC) of the National Association of Intercollegiate Athletics (NAIA) from 1969–70 to 2015–16, therefore it held dual membership with the NAIA and the NCAA after 1981–82.)	2016	Yes	American Rivers (ARC)
New Jersey City University (NJCU) (Note: NJCU merged with Kean University in 2026, becoming Kean Jersey City.)	Jersey City, New Jersey	1929	Public	7,300	Gothic Knights	2004	2005	No	USCAA Independent
College of New Rochelle (Note: New Rochelle was also a dual member with the USCAA and the Hudson Valley Intercollegiate Athletic Conference (HVIAC) from 2005–06 to 2018–19.)	New Rochelle, New York	1904	Catholic (Archdiocese of New York)	N/A	Blue Angels	1982	2019	No	N/A (Note: New Rochelle merged into Mercy College after the 2018–19 school year.)
New York University Tandon School of Engineering (Note: The NYU engineering school was the standalone Polytechnic University while in the NEAC. Polytechnic became affiliated with New York University (NYU) in 2008 as the Polytechnic Institute of New York University (athletically known as NYU Poly), and merged completely into NYU in 2014. As part of the final merger of NYU Poly with NYU, Poly's athletics program was merged into that of NYU.) (NYU Poly)	Brooklyn, New York	1854	Nonsectarian	4,487	Fighting; Blue Jays	1979	2004	No	N/A
Newbury College	Brookline, Massachusetts	1962	Nonsectarian	N/A	Nighthawks	2001	2008	No	Closed in 2019
North Central University	Minneapolis, Minnesota	1930	Assemblies of God	1,200	Rams	2006	2013	No	Upper Midwest (UMAC)
Northern Vermont University-Johnson	Johnson, Vermont	1881	Public	1,803	Badgers	1973	2001	No	N/A (Note: Northern Vermont was merged into Vermont State University in 2023, assuming the former's membership in the North Atlantic Conference.)
Northern Vermont University-Lyndon	Lyndon, Vermont	1911	Public	1,519	Hornets	2006	2008	No	N/A
Pine Manor College (Note: This institution is a former women's college, which has eventually turned into a co-educational college (William Peace since 2012–13, Pine Manor from 2014–15 to 2019–20, and Saint Elizabeth since 2016–17).)	Chestnut Hill, Massachusetts	1911	Nonsectarian	419	Gators	1983; 2016 (Note: Pine Manor initially left the independent ranks after the 1994–95 school year to join the Great Northeast Athletic Conference (GNAC), which would later joined the Great South Athletic Conference (GSAC) in 2012–13; however, they rejoined after four seasons due to the GSAC folding.)	1995; 2017	No	N/A (Note: Pine Manor was acquired by Boston College in 2021.)
Russell Sage College	Albany and Troy, New York	1916	Nonsectarian	2,389	Gators	1993	2007	No	Empire 8 (E8)
Rust College	Holly Springs, Mississippi	1866	United Methodist	900	Bearcats	1988	2017	No	HBCU (HBCUAC)
Saint Elizabeth University (Note: Saint Elizabeth (N.J.) was known as The College of Saint Elizabeth during its stint as a member.)	Morristown, New Jersey	1899	Catholic (Sisters of Charity)	1,200	Eagles	1988	2009	No	United East
Saint Joseph's College of Maine	Standish, Maine	1912	Catholic (R.S.M.)	1,987	Monks	1975	2007	No	Great Northeast (GNAC)
Salem College	Winston-Salem, North Carolina	1772	Moravian	565	Spirits	2005	2009	No	USA South
Sarah Lawrence College	Yonkers, New York	1926	Nonsectarian	1,782	Gryphons	2013	2014	No	Skyline
Savannah College of Art and Design (Note: Savannah A&D had sponsored men's or women's basketball until after the 2008–09 school year.)	Savannah, Georgia	1978	Non-profit art school	11,897	Bees	1992	2003	No	The Sun (TSC)
Spalding University	Louisville, Kentucky	1814	Catholic (S.C.N.)	1,692	Golden Eagles	2007	2009	No	St. Louis (SLIAC)
St. Joseph's University, New York – Brooklyn Campus (Note: St. Joseph's Brooklyn was known as St. Joseph's College during its stint as a member. St. Joseph's was also a dual member with the USCAA and the Hudson Valley Intercollegiate Athletic Conference (HVIAC) three years after joining that association in 2004.)	Brooklyn, New York	1916	Catholic (C.S.J.)	1,261	Bears	2007	2015	No	Skyline
Stephens College	Columbia, Missouri	1833	Nonsectarian	754	Stars	1994	2004	No	American Midwest (AMC)
Stevenson University (Note: Stevenson was known as Villa Julie College during its stint as a member. It adopted its current name in 2007.)	Stevenson, Maryland	1947	Catholic	3,621	Mustangs	1994	2004	Yes	MAC Commonwealth
Stony Brook University (Note: Also known as the State of University of New York at Stony Brook.)	Stony Brook, New York	1957	Public	26,782	Seawolves	1994	1995	Yes	Coastal (CAA)
State University of New York at Canton	Canton, New York	1906	Public	3,122	Kangaroos	2011	2017	No	S.U. New York (SUNYAC)
State University of New York at Morrisville	Morrisville, New York	1908	Public	2,486	Mustangs	2006	2007	Yes	S.U. New York (SUNYAC)
Thomas College	Waterville, Maine	1894	Nonsectarian	1,949	Terriers	2001	2003	No	North Atlantic (NAC)
Thomas More University	Crestview Hills, Kentucky	1921	Catholic (Diocese of Covington/ Benedictines)	1,963	Saints	1996	2005	Yes	Great Midwest (G-MAC)
Trinity Washington University	Washington, D.C.	1897	Catholic (SNDdeN)	2,100	Tigers	2007; 2015 (Note: Trinity Washington left the Independent ranks after the 2011–12 school year; before rejoining in 2015–16.)	2026	No	USCAA Independent
University of California, Santa Cruz	Santa Cruz, California	1965	Public (Note: Part of the University of California system.)	19,700	Banana Slugs	1980	2019 (Note: UC Santa Cruz participated in the Great South Athletic Conference during the 2015-16 school year, but only in women's sports. Men's sports remained independent during that school year.)	No	Coast to Coast (C2C)
University of Valley Forge	Phoenixville, Pennsylvania	1939	Assemblies of God	742	Patriots	2013	2017	No	Closed in 2026
Warren Wilson College	Swannanoa, North Carolina	1894	Presbyterian (PCUSA)	650	Owls	2020	2022	No	Coast to Coast (C2C)
William Peace University (Note: William Peace was known as Peace College during its stint as a member. It adopted its current name in 2011.)	Raleigh, North Carolina	1857	Presbyterian (PCUSA)	950	Pacers	2001	2003	No	USA South
Wilmington College	Wilmington, Ohio	1870	Quakers	990	Quakers	1996	1998	Yes	Ohio (OAC)
University of Wisconsin–Milwaukee	Milwaukee, Wisconsin	1956	Public	22,481	Panthers	1980	1985	No	Horizon

== Acrobatics & tumbling ==
Elevated from the NCAA Emerging Sports for Women program to full championship status in January 2026; first NCAA championship to be held in spring 2027.

Institution	Team	Location	Founded	Type	Enrollment	Primary conference
East Texas Baptist University	Tigers	Marshall, Texas	1912	Private	1,714	ASC
University of Mary Hardin–Baylor	Crusaders	Belton, Texas	1845	Private	2,713	ASC

== Football ==
Institution	Team	Location	Founded	Type	Enrollment	Primary conference
Keystone College	Giants	La Plume, Pennsylvania	1868	Private	1,600	United East

== Field hockey ==
Institution	Team	Location	Founded	Type	Enrollment	Primary conference
Meredith College†	Avenging Angels	Raleigh, North Carolina	1891	Private	1,990	USA South
Southern Virginia University	Knights	Buena Vista, Virginia	1867	Private	1,106	USA South

† - Women's college, therefore not competing in men's sports.

== Golf ==
=== Men ===
Institution	Team	Location	Founded	Type	Enrollment	Primary conference
Christopher Newport University	Captains	Newport News, Virginia	1961	Public	5,186	Coast to Coast
University of Wisconsin–Eau Claire	Blugolds	Eau Claire, Wisconsin	1916	Public	10,043	WIAC

=== Women ===
Institution	Team	Location	Founded	Type	Enrollment	Primary conference
Christopher Newport University	Captains	Newport News, Virginia	1961	Public	5,186	Coast to Coast

== Ice hockey ==
=== Men ===
Institution	Team	Location	Founded	Type	Enrollment	Joined	Primary conference
Hiram College	Terriers	Hiram, Ohio	1850	Disciples of Christ	1,271	2025	Presidents'

=== Women ===
Institution	Team	Location	Founded	Type	Enrollment	Joined	Primary conference
Hiram College	Terriers	Hiram, Ohio	1850	Disciples of Christ	1,271	2026	Presidents'

== Lacrosse ==
=== Men ===
Institution	Team	Location	Founded	Type	Enrollment	Primary conference
Whittier College	Poets	Whittier, California	1887	Private	1,540	SCIAC

== Rowing ==
Institution	Team	Location	Founded	Type	Enrollment	Primary conference
Gordon College	Fighting Scots	Wenham, Massachusetts	1889	Private	2,109	CNE
Nazareth University	Golden Flyers	Pittsford, New York	1924	Private	3,140	Empire 8

== Swimming & diving ==
=== Men ===
Institution	Team	Location	Founded	Type	Enrollment	Primary conference
Coe College (Note: Coe College, Loras College, Luther College, Nebraska Wesleyan University, and Simpson College compete in an invitational held by the American Rivers Conference but it is not an official sport sponsored by the conference so the colleges are functional independents.)	Kohawks	Cedar Rapids, Iowa	1851	Private	1,355	American Rivers
Gordon College (Note: Gordon College compete in the New England Intercollegiate Swimming & Diving Association Championship which is not recognized by the NCAA, therefore these colleges are considered independents.)	Fighting Scots	Wenham, Massachusetts	1889	Private	2,109	CNE
Johns Hopkins University	Blue Jays	Baltimore, Maryland	1876	Private	20,174	Centennial
Loras College	Duhawks	Dubuque, Iowa	1839	Private	1,550	American Rivers
Luther College	Norse	Decorah, Iowa	1861	Lutheran	2,573	American Rivers
Nebraska Wesleyan University	Prairie Wolves	Lincoln, Nebraska	1887	Private	1,600	American Rivers
Simpson College	Storm	Indianola, Iowa	1860	Private	1,966	American Rivers
Southern Virginia University	Knights	Buena Vista, Virginia	1867	Private	1,106	USA South

=== Women ===
Institution	Team	Location	Founded	Type	Enrollment	Primary conference
Coe College	Kohawks	Cedar Rapids, Iowa	1851	Private	1,355	American Rivers
Gordon College	Fighting Scots	Wenham, Massachusetts	1889	Private	2,109	CNE
Johns Hopkins University	Blue Jays	Baltimore, Maryland	1876	Private	20,174	Centennial
Loras College	Duhawks	Dubuque, Iowa	1839	Private	1,550	American Rivers
Luther College	Norse	Decorah, Iowa	1861	Lutheran	2,573	American Rivers
Nebraska Wesleyan University	Prairie Wolves	Lincoln, Nebraska	1887	Private	1,600	American Rivers
Simpson College	Storm	Indianola, Iowa	1860	Private	1,966	American Rivers
Southern Virginia University	Knights	Buena Vista, Virginia	1867	Private	1,106	USA South

== Track & field (indoor) ==
=== Men ===
Institution	Team	Location	Founded	Type	Enrollment	Primary conference
McMurry University	War Hawks	Abilene, Texas	1923	Private	1,430	ASC
Wentworth Institute of Technology	Leopards	Boston, Massachusetts	1904	Private	3,728	CNE

=== Women ===
Institution	Team	Location	Founded	Type	Enrollment	Primary conference
McMurry University	War Hawks	Abilene, Texas	1923	Private	1,430	ASC
Wentworth Institute of Technology	Leopards	Boston, Massachusetts	1904	Private	3,728	CNE

== Track & field (outdoor) ==
=== Men ===
Institution	Team	Location	Founded	Type	Enrollment	Primary conference
Wentworth Institute of Technology (Note: Wentworth Institute of Technology competes in the Conference of New England Championship which is not recognized as a varsity sport by the conference, thus Wentworth Tech is considered an independent.)	Leopards	Boston, Massachusetts	1904	Private	3,728	CNE

== Volleyball (indoor) ==
=== Men ===
Current for the next NCAA men's volleyball season in spring 2027.

Institution	Team	Location	Founded	Type	Enrollment	Primary conference
California Lutheran University	Kingsmen	Thousand Oaks, California	1959	Private	3,298	SCIAC
Greenville University	Panthers	Greenville, Illinois	1892	Private	1,088	SLIAC
Gwynedd Mercy University	Griffins	Gwynedd Valley, Pennsylvania	1948	Private	2,017	Atlantic East
Johnson & Wales University–Charlotte	Wildcats	Charlotte, North Carolina	2004 (Note: Johnson & Wales University was founded in 1914, but the Charlotte campus did not open until 2004.)	Private	1,184	Coast to Coast
Lake Forest College	Foresters	Lake Forest, Illinois	1857	Private	1,395	Midwest
Regent University	Royals	Virginia Beach, Virginia	1977 (Note: Regent was founded in 1977, but did not enroll undergraduates until 2000.)	Private	10,657	Coast to Coast
Rhode Island College	Anchormen	Providence, Rhode Island	1854	Public	6,155	Little East
Simpson College	Storm	Indianola, Iowa	1965	Private	1,151	American Rivers
University of California, Santa Cruz	Banana Slugs	Santa Cruz, California	1965	Public	19,700	Coast to Coast
Westminster College	Blue Jays	Fulton, Missouri	1851	Private	610	SLIAC
William Peace University	Pacers	Raleigh, North Carolina	1857	Private	950	USA South
University of Wisconsin–Stevens Point	Pointers	Stevens Point, Wisconsin	1894	Public	7,545	WIAC

== Wrestling ==
=== Men ===
Institution	Team	Location	Founded	Type	Enrollment	Primary conference
Keystone College	Giants	La Plume, Pennsylvania	1868	Private	1,600	United East Conference
Elizabethtown College	Blue Jays	Elizabethtown, Pennsylvania	1899	Private	1,671	Landmark Conference
Huntingdon College	Hawks	Montgomery, Alabama	1854	Private	1,107	Collegiate Conference of the South
Marymount University	Saints	Arlington, Virginia	1950	Private	4,257	Atlantic East Conference
Ohio Wesleyan University	Battling Bishops	Delaware, Ohio	1842	Private	1,600	North Coast Athletic Conference
Saint John's University (Minnesota)	Johnnies	Collegeville, Minnesota	1913	Private	3,640	Minnesota Intercollegiate Athletic Conference
Schreiner University	Mountaineers	Kerrville, Texas	1923	Private	1,308	Southern Collegiate Athletic Conference
The College of New Jersey	Lions	Ewing, New Jersey	1855	Public	7,340	New Jersey Athletic Conference
University of Scranton	Royals	Scranton, Pennsylvania	1888	Private	5,422	Landmark Conference
University of the Ozarks	Eagles	Clarksville, Arkansas	1834	Private	872	American Southwest Conference
Wabash College	Little Giants	Crawfordsville, Indiana	1832	Private	867	North Coast Athletic Conference
Westminster College	Blue Jays	Fulton, Missouri	1851	Private	609	St. Louis Intercollegiate Athletic Conference

== Emerging sports for women ==
=== Rugby ===
Institution	Team	Location	Founded	Type	Enrollment	Primary conference
Colby-Sawyer College	Chargers	New London, New Hampshire	1837	Private	1,043	GNAC
Marywood University	Pacers	Scranton, Pennsylvania	1915	Private	2,470	Atlantic East
Norwich University	Cadets	Northfield, Vermont	1819	Military	2,300	GNAC
University of New England	Nor'easters	Biddeford, Maine	1831	Private	8,085	CNE

=== Triathlon ===
Institution	Team	Location	Founded	Type	Enrollment	Primary conference
Central College	Dutch	Pella, Iowa	1853	Private	1,575	American Rivers
Coe College	Kohawks	Cedar Rapids, Iowa	1851	Private	1,355	American Rivers
Millikin University	Big Blue	Decatur, Illinois	1901	Private	2,118	CCIW
North Central College	Cardinals	Naperville, Illinois	1861	Private	2,490	CCIW

== See also ==
- NCAA Division I independent schools
- NCAA Division II independent schools
- NAIA independent schools
