= North Atlantic Conference =

Collegiate athletic conference

- Formerly: North Atlantic Women's Conference
- Association: NCAA
- Founded: 1996
- Commissioner: Marcella Zalot (since 2016)
- Sports fielded: 16; men's: 8; women's: 8
- Division: Division III
- No. of teams: 8
- Headquarters: Waterville, Maine
- Region: Northeastern United States
- Website: nacathletics.com

Locations
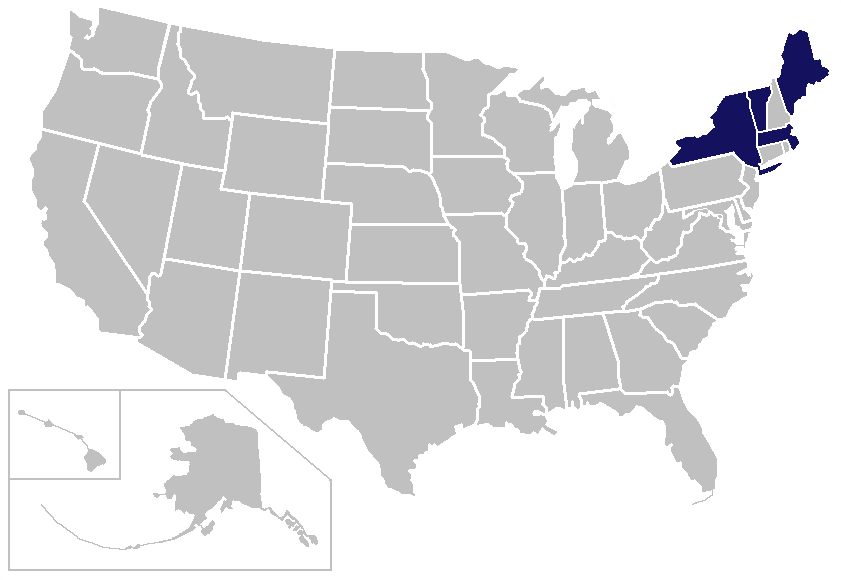

The North Atlantic Conference (NAC) is an intercollegiate athletic conference which competes in the National Collegiate Athletic Association (NCAA) Division III. Member schools are primarily small liberal arts colleges in the New England states of Maine, Massachusetts and Vermont, as well as the Mid-Atlantic state of New York.

The conference was founded in 1996 when six colleges agreed to form the North Atlantic Women's Conference. It changed to its current name in the fall of 1999. It currently sponsors a total of 17 men's and women's sports played by teams of the 13 institutions therein.

The 17 different sports that are played in the NAC range from the fall season, throughout the winter, and to the spring season. These sports are played among both men's and women's teams.

In the fall season, there are six sports played. Among these are, men's and women's cross country, field hockey, men's golf, men's and women's soccer, women's tennis, and women's volleyball.

In the winter season there are two sports played, which are men's and women's basketball along with men's and women's swimming and diving.

In the spring time there are four sports both for men's and women's teams. The NAC has men's and women's lacrosse, baseball, softball, men's tennis, and men's and women's outdoor track & field.

== History ==
North Atlantic Conference
Location of NAC members: full member

=== Recent events ===
On June 9, 2016, Colby–Sawyer announced that it would leave the NAC following the 2017–18 school year to join the Great Northeast Athletic Conference (GNAC).

On May 4, 2017, Castleton announced that it would leave the NAC following the 2017–18 school year to join the Little East Conference (LEC).

On June 13, 2017, Green Mountain announced that it would leave the NAC (and the NCAA) following the 2017–18 school year to join the National Association of Intercollegiate Athletics (NAIA), which it would spend one season as an NAIA member before closing in 2019.

On July 31, 2017, New England College announced that it would leave the NAC following the 2017–18 school year to join the New England Collegiate Conference (NECC).

The NAC announced the additions of the Maine–Presque Isle and the State University of New York at Canton (SUNY Canton) as full members beginning in the fall of 2018. Both schools had been members of the American Collegiate Athletic Association (ACAA).

On November 30, 2018, the NAC announced that the State University of New York at Delhi (SUNY Delhi), already an associate member in six sports (men's golf, men's lacrosse, men's and women's tennis, and men's and women's track & field), would become a full member of the conference effective in the fall of 2019. At that time, five additional Delhi sports—men's and women's cross country, men's golf, men's and women's soccer, and women's volleyball—began NAC play. Three more sports—men's and women's basketball, plus softball—remained in the ACAA as its associate member until starting NAC play in 2020–21.

On August 20, 2019, the NAC announced that three schools—Cazenovia College, the State University of New York at Cobleskill (SUNY Cobleskill) and the State University of New York Polytechnic Institute (SUNY Poly)—would become full members in July 2020.

On March 1, 2022, the NAC announced that SUNY Morrisville (formerly Morrisville State)—alongside Lesley—would join as full members in the 2023–24 season.

On January 9, 2023, the NAC announced that they would welcome Eastern Nazarene College as a full member, also starting in the 2023–24 season.

On October 5, 2023, SUNY Canton and SUNY Morrisville accepted to join to the State University of New York Athletic Conference (SUNYAC). A month later, on November 21, 2023, SUNY Poly followed suit to join the Empire 8.

Eastern Nazarene announced that it would be permanently closing following the 2023–24 academic year.

On June 24, 2024, Anna Maria College had accepted to join the NAC as an associate member for men's lacrosse, beginning in the 2026 spring season of the 2025–26 academic year.

On June 5, 2025, SUNY Cobleskill and SUNY Delhi had accepted to join the SUNYAC, thus leaving the NAC at 8 full members (all within New England).

=== Chronological timeline ===
- 1996 – The North Atlantic Conference (NAC) was founded as the North Atlantic Women's Conference (NAWC). Charter members included Bay Path College (now Bay Path University), Lasell College (now Lasell University), Lesley College (now Lesley University), the Maine Maritime Academy, the Massachusetts College of Pharmacy (now the Massachusetts College of Pharmacy and Health Sciences) and Wheelock College, beginning the 1996–97 academic year.
- 1999:
  - Mass Pharmacy left the NAWC after the 1998–99 academic year.
  - The NAWC was rebranded as the North Atlantic Conference, while adding men's sports in there, beginning the 1999–2000 academic year.
  - Becker College, Elms College and Mount Ida College joined the NAC in the 1999–2000 academic year.
- 2000 – Simmons College (now Simmons University) and Western New England College (now Western New England University) joined the NAC as associate members for field hockey in the 2000 fall season (2000–01 academic year).
- 2001:
  - Castleton State College (later Castleton University and now Vermont State University at Castleton) and Johnson State College (later Northern Vermont University at Johnson and now Vermont State University at Johnson) joined the NAC in the 2001–02 academic year.
  - Husson College (now Husson University), the University of Maine at Farmington (UMaine–Farmington) and Thomas College joined the NAC as associate members for field hockey in the 2001 fall season (2001–02 academic year).
- 2003 – Husson, UMaine–Farmington and Thomas upgraded their NAC memberships for all sports in the 2003–04 academic year.
- 2004 – Three institutions joined the NAC as associate members, all effective in the 2005 spring season (2004–05 academic year):
  - Daniel Webster College and Emerson College for men's lacrosse
  - and Saint Joseph's College of Maine for baseball
- 2007:
  - Two institutions left the NAC as associate members, both effective after the 2006–07 academic year:
    - Saint Joseph's (Me.) for baseball
    - and Western New England for field hockey
  - Lasell and Mount Ida left the NAC to join the Great Northeast Athletic Conference (GNAC) after the 2006–07 academic year; while both remained in the conference as associate members (Lasell for field hockey, and Mount Ida for men's lacrosse).
- 2008:
  - Bay Path, Becker, Elms, Lesley and Wheelock left the NAC to form part of the then-newly created New England Collegiate Conference (NECC) after the 2007–08 academic year.
  - Daniel Webster left the NAC as an associate member for men's lacrosse after the 2008 spring season (2007–08 academic year).
  - Green Mountain College and Lyndon State College (later Northern Vermont University at Lyndon and now Vermont State University at Lyndon) joined the NAC in the 2008–09 academic year.
  - Saint Joseph's (Me.) rejoined the NAC as an associate member (this time for field hockey and men's lacrosse) in the 2008–09 academic year.
- 2009 – Rivier University joined the NAC as an associate member for field hockey in the 2009 fall season (2009–10 academic year).
- 2010 – Emerson, Mount Ida and Saint Joseph's (Me.) left the NAC as associate members for men's lacrosse after the 2010 spring season (2009–10 academic year).
- 2011:
  - Colby–Sawyer College and New England College joined the NAC in the 2008–09 academic year.
  - Salem State University joined the NAC as an associate member for men's golf in the 2012 spring season (2011–12 academic year).
- 2012 – The Massachusetts College of Liberal Arts (MCLA) joined the NAC as an associate member for men's golf, men's lacrosse and men's & women's tennis in the 2013 spring season (2012–13 academic year).
- 2014 – Lasell, Rivier, Saint Joseph's (Me.) and Simmons left the NAC as associate members for field hockey after the 2013 fall season (2013–14 academic year).
- 2017:
  - Two institutions joined the NAC as associate members, both effective in the 2017–18 academic year.
    - The University of Maine at Presque Isle (UMaine–Presque Isle or UMPI) for men's golf
    - and the State University of New York at Delhi (SUNY Delhi) for men's and women's track & field
- 2018:
  - Four institutions left the NAC to join their future respective primary home conferences, all effective after the 2017–18 academic year:
    - Castleton to join the Little East Conference (LEC); while it remained in the conference as an associate member for men's golf
    - Colby–Sawyer to join the GNAC
    - Green Mountain to join the National Association of Intercollegiate Athletics (NAIA) as an Independent within the Association of Independent Institutions (AII)
    - and New England (N.H.) to join the NECC
  - The State University of New York at Canton (SUNY Canton) joined the NAC (with UMaine–Presque Isle (or UMPI) upgrading for all sports) in the 2018–19 academic year.
  - Two institutions joined the NAC as associate members, both effective in the 2018–19 academic year.
    - former full member Lesley rejoining for women's tennis
    - and SUNY Delhi to add men's golf, men's lacrosse, and men's and women's tennis into its NAC associate membership
- 2019 – SUNY Delhi upgraded its NAC membership for all sports in the 2019–20 academic year; although its men's and women's basketball and softball teams would later join for 2020–21.
- 2020:
  - Two institutions left the NAC as associate members, all effective after the 2019–20 academic year.
    - Castleton, the MCLA and Salem State left the NAC as associate members for men's golf
    - and Lesley for women's tennis
  - Cazenovia College, the State University of New York at Cobleskill (SUNY Cobleskill) and the State University of New York Polytechnic Institute (SUNY Poly) joined the NAC in the 2020–21 academic year.
- 2022:
  - The MCLA left the NAC as an associate member for men's and women's tennis after the 2022 spring season (2021–22 academic year). The last time those two sports competed were in the 2019–20 and 2020–21 school years respectively. They were later discontinued due to athletic budget cuts at the end of 2021–22.
- 2023:
  - Cazenovia left the NAC after the 2022–23 academic year; as the school ceased operations.
  - Eastern Nazarene College and the State University of New York at Morrisville (SUNY Morrisville), with charter member Lesley rejoining, joined the NAC in the 2023–24 academic year.
- 2024 – Four institutions left the NAC to join their future respective primary home conferences, all effective after the 2023–24 academic year:
  - Eastern Nazarene to discontinue its athletics program before ceasing operations in May 2025.
  - SUNY Canton and SUNY Morrisville to the State University of New York Athletic Conference (SUNYAC)
  - and SUNY Poly to the Empire 8 Athletic Conference (Empire 8)
- 2025 – Anna Maria College joined the NAC as an associate member for men's lacrosse in the 2026 spring season (2025–26 academic year).
- 2026:
  - Anna Maria left the NAC as an associate member for men's lacrosse after the 2026 spring season (2025–26 academic year); as the school ceased operations.
  - SUNY Cobleskill and SUNY Delhi left the NAC to join the SUNYAC after the 2025–26 academic year.

== Member schools ==
=== Current members ===
The NAC currently has eight full members, all but three are public schools.

| Institution | Location | Founded | Affiliation | Enrollment | Nickname | Joined (Note: Represents the calendar year when fall sports competition begins.) | Colors |
|---|---|---|---|---|---|---|---|
| Husson University | Bangor, Maine | 1898 | Nonsectarian | 3,476 | Eagles | 2003 | |
| Lesley University (Note: This institution is a former women's college, which has eventually turned into a co-educational college (Lesley since 2005–06).) | Cambridge, Massachusetts | 1909 | Nonsectarian | 6,593 | Lynx | 1996; 2023 (Note: Lesley initially left the NAC after the 2007–08 school year, but later rejoined before the 2023–24 school year.) | |
| University of Maine at Farmington | Farmington, Maine | 1863 | Public (Note: Part of the University of Maine System.) | 1,861 | Beavers | 2003 | |
| University of Maine at Presque Isle | Presque Isle, Maine | 1903 | Public | 1,469 | Owls | 2018 | |
| Maine Maritime Academy | Castine, Maine | 1941 | Public | 941 | Mariners | 1996 | |
| Thomas College | Waterville, Maine | 1894 | Nonsectarian | 1,949 | Terriers | 2003 | |
| Vermont State University–Johnson (Note: The former Johnson State and Lyndon State Colleges were merged into Northern Vermont University effective July 1, 2018. Both former institutions remain separate campuses, with their own athletic programs. The schools were subsequently merged with Castleton University and Vermont Technical College to become Vermont State University on July 1, 2023.) | Johnson, Vermont | 1881 | Public (Note: Part of the Vermont State Colleges System.) | 1,803 | Badgers | 2001 | |
| Vermont State University–Lyndon | Lyndon, Vermont | 1911 | Public | 1,519 | Hornets | 2008 | |

=== Associate members ===
The NAC currently has seven associate members, all but two are private schools:

| Institution | Location | Founded | Affiliation | Enrollment | Nickname | Joined (Note: Represents the calendar year when fall sports competition begins.) | Colors | NAC sport(s) | Primary conference |
|---|---|---|---|---|---|---|---|---|---|
| Alfred University | Alfred, New York | 1836 | Nonsectarian | 2,189 | Saxons | 2024 | | Men's tennis (Note: The NAC entered into a partnership with the Empire 8 Athletic Conference (Empire 8) by which the two leagues would operate as a single conference in men's tennis, with championships immediately conducted for that sport; thus the Empire 8 sponsoring that tournament championship, beginning the 2024–25 school year.) | Empire 8 (E8) |
| Houghton University | Houghton, New York | 1883 | Wesleyan | 927 | Highlanders | 2024 | | Men's tennis | Empire 8 (E8) |
| Massachusetts College of Liberal Arts (MCLA) | North Adams, Massachusetts | 1894 | Public | 1,202 | Trailblazers | 2012 | | Men's lacrosse | Mass. State (MASCAC) |
| Nazareth University | Pittsford, New York | 1924 | Nonsectarian | 2,791 | Golden Flyers | 2024 | | Men's tennis | Empire 8 (E8) |
| Norwich University | Northfield, Vermont | 1819 | Private (SMC) | 2,300 | Cadets | 2024 | | Men's tennis | Great Northeast (GNAC) |
| St. John Fisher University | Rochester, New York | 1948 | Catholic (Basilians) | 3,610 | Cardinals | 2024 | | Men's tennis | Empire 8 (E8) |
| State University of New York at Oswego | Oswego, New York | 1861 | Public (Note: Part of the State University of New York System.) | 7,636 | Lakers | 2024 | | Men's tennis | S.U. New York (SUNYAC) |

=== Former members ===
The NAC has eighteen former full members, all but three were private schools:

| Institution | Location | Founded | Affiliation | Enrollment | Nickname | Joined (Note: Represents the calendar year when fall sports competition begins.) | Left (Note: Represents the calendar year when spring sports competition ends.) | Current conference |
|---|---|---|---|---|---|---|---|---|
| Bay Path College (Note: This institution is a women's college, therefore it does not compete in men's sports.) (Note: Currently known as Bay Path University since 2014.) | Longmeadow, Massachusetts | 1897 | Nonsectarian | 1,400 | Wildcats | 1996 | 2008 | USCAA Independent |
| Becker College | Worcester, Massachusetts | 1784 | Nonsectarian | N/A | Hawks | 1999 | 2008 | Closed in 2021 |
| Cazenovia College | Cazenovia, New York | 1913 | Nonsectarian | 800 | Wildcats | 2020 | 2023 | Closed in 2023 |
| Colby–Sawyer College | New London, New Hampshire | 1837 | Nonsectarian | 1,415 | Chargers | 2011 | 2018 | Great Northeast (GNAC) |
| Eastern Nazarene College | Quincy, Massachusetts | 1900 | Nazarene | 772 | Lions | 2023 | 2024 | Closed in 2024 |
| Elms College (Note: This institution is a former women's college, it has since become a co-educational college (Elms since 1998–99, Lesley since 1997–98, Lesley since 2005–06).) | Chicopee, Massachusetts | 1928 | Catholic (S.S.J.) | 1,118 | Blazers | 1999 | 2008 | Great Northeast (GNAC) |
| Green Mountain College | Poultney, Vermont | 1834 | United; Methodist | N/A | Eagles | 2008 | 2018 | Closed in 2019 |
| Lasell College (Note: Lasell competed as an associate member of the NAC for field hockey from the 2007 to 2013 fall seasons (2007–08 to 2013–14 school years).) (Note: Currently known as Lasell University since 2019.) | Newton, Massachusetts | 1851 | Nonsectarian | 1,800 | Lasers | 1996 | 2007 | Great Northeast (GNAC) |
| Massachusetts College of Pharmacy and Health Sciences | Boston, Massachusetts | 1823 | Nonsectarian | 6,010 | Cardinals | 1996 | 1999 | N/A (Note: Mass Pharmacy discontinued its athletics program after the 1998–99 school year.) |
| Mount Ida College (Note: Mount Ida competed as an associate member of the NAC for men's lacrosse from the 2008 to 2010 spring seasons (2007–08 to 2009–10 school years).) | Newton, Massachusetts | 1899 | Nonsectarian | N/A | Mustangs | 1999 | 2007 | Closed in 2018 |
| New England College | Henniker, New Hampshire | 1946 | Nonsectarian | 2,000 | Pilgrims | 2011 | 2018 | Great Northeast (GNAC) |
| State University of New York at Canton (SUNY Canton) | Canton, New York | 1906 | Public (Note: Part of the State University of New York System.) | 3,122 | Roos | 2018 | 2024 | S.U. New York (SUNYAC) |
| State University of New York at Cobleskill (SUNY Cobleskill) | Cobleskill, New York | 1911 | Public | 2,087 | Fighting; Tigers | 2020 | 2026 | S.U. New York (SUNYAC) |
| State University of New York at Delhi (SUNY Delhi) | Delhi, New York | 1913 | Public | 3,088 | Broncos | 2019 (Note: Before becoming a full member in the 2019–20 school year, SUNY Delhi had been an associate member in six sports. Men's and women's track joined in 2017–18, while men's golf, men's lacrosse, and men's and women's tennis joined in 2018–19. Men's and women's basketball and softball would later join in 2020–21, a year after becoming a full member of the NAC.) | 2026 | S.U. New York (SUNYAC) |
| State University of New York at Morrisville (SUNY Morrisville) | Morrisville, New York | 1908 | Public | 2,486 | Mustangs | 2023 | 2024 | S.U. New York (SUNYAC) |
| State University of New York Polytechnic Institute (SUNY Poly) | Marcy, New York | 1913 | Public | 3,061 | Wildcats | 2020 | 2024 | Empire 8 (E8) |
| Vermont State University–Castleton (Note: Castleton University merged with Northern Vermont University and Vermont Technical College to become Vermont State University on July 1, 2023.) (Note: Castleton competed as an associate member of the NAC for men's golf from the 2019 to 2020 spring seasons (2018–19 to 2019–20 school years).) | Castleton, Vermont | 1787 | Public (Note: Part of the Vermont State Colleges System.) | 2,130 | Spartans | 2001 | 2018 | Little East (LEC) |
| Wheelock College | Boston, Massachusetts | 1888 | Nonsectarian | 1,237 | Wildcats | 1996 | 2008 | N/A (Note: Wheelock was merged into Boston University after the school closed in 2018.) |

=== Former associate members ===
The NAC had thirteen former associate members, all but three were private schools. This list includes only associate members that have completely departed the NAC. Current full members that had previously housed select sports in the NAC, such as SUNY Delhi, are not included.

| Institution | Location | Founded | Affiliation | Enrollment | Nickname | Joined (Note: Represents the calendar year when fall sports competition begins.) | Left (Note: Represents the calendar year when spring sports competition ends.) | NAC sport(s) | Primary conference |
|---|---|---|---|---|---|---|---|---|---|
| Anna Maria College | Paxton, Massachusetts | 1946 | Catholic (S.S.A.) | 1,485 | Amcats | 2025 | 2026 | Men's lacrosse | Closed in 2026 |
| Daniel Webster College | Nashua, New Hampshire | 1965 | For-profit | 1,200 | Eagles | 2004 | 2008 | Men's lacrosse | Closed in 2017 |
| Emerson College | Boston, Massachusetts | 1880 | Nonsectarian | 4,113 | Lions | 2004 | 2010 | Men's lacrosse | New England (NEWMAC) |
| Lasell College (Note: Lasell was a full member of the NAC from 1996–97 to 2006–07.) (Note: Currently known as Lasell University since 2019.) | Newton, Massachusetts | 1851 | Private | 1,800 | Lasers | 2007 | 2014 | Field hockey | Great Northeast (GNAC) |
| Massachusetts College of Liberal Arts (MCLA) | North Adams, Massachusetts | 1894 | Public | 1,202 | Trailblazers | 2012 | 2020 | Men's golf | Mass. State (MASCAC) |
| Massachusetts College of Liberal Arts (MCLA) | North Adams, Massachusetts | 1894 | Public | 1,202 | Trailblazers | 2012 | 2022 | Men's tennis (Note: The MLCA men's and women's tennis teams last competed in the 2019–20 and 2020–21 school years respectively. They were later discontinued due to athletic budget cuts at the end of the 2021–22 school year.) | Mass. State (MASCAC) |
| Massachusetts College of Liberal Arts (MCLA) | North Adams, Massachusetts | 1894 | Public | 1,202 | Trailblazers | 2012 | 2022 | Women's tennis | Mass. State (MASCAC) |
| Mount Ida College (Note: Mount Ida was a full member of the NAC from 1999–2000 to 2006–07.) | Newton, Massachusetts | 1899 | Nonsectarian | 1,300 | Mustangs | 2007 | 2010 | Men's lacrosse | Closed in 2018 |
| Rivier University | Nashua, New Hampshire | 1933 | Catholic (S.P.M.) | 2,300 | Raiders | 2009 | 2014 | Field hockey | Great Northeast (GNAC) |
| Salem State University | Salem, Massachusetts | 1854 | Public | 7,242 | Vikings | 2011 | 2020 | Men's golf | Mass. State (MASCAC) |
| Simmons College (Note: Currently known as Simmons University since 2018.) | Boston, Massachusetts | 1899 | Nonsectarian | 4,933 | Sharks | 2000 | 2014 | Field hockey | Great Northeast (GNAC) |
| Saint Joseph's College of Maine | Standish, Maine | 1912 | Catholic (R.S.M.) | 1,000 | Monks | 2004 | 2007 | Baseball | Great Northeast (GNAC) |
| Saint Joseph's College of Maine | Standish, Maine | 1912 | Catholic (R.S.M.) | 1,000 | Monks | 2008 | 2014 | Field hockey | Great Northeast (GNAC) |
| Saint Joseph's College of Maine | Standish, Maine | 1912 | Catholic (R.S.M.) | 1,000 | Monks | 2008 | 2010 | Men's lacrosse | Great Northeast (GNAC) |
| Vermont State University–Castleton (Note: Castleton University merged with Northern Vermont University and Vermont Technical College to become Vermont State University on July 1, 2023.) (Note: Castleton was a full member of the NAC from 2001–02 to 2017–18.) | Castleton, Vermont | 1787 | Public (Note: Part of the Vermont State Colleges System.) | 2,130 | Spartans | 2018 | 2020 | Men's golf | Little East (LEC) |
| Wells College | Aurora, New York | 1868 | Nonsectarian | 480 | Express | 2023 | 2024 | Field hockey | Closed in 2024 |
| Western New England University | Springfield, Massachusetts | 1919 | Nonsectarian | 3,657 | Golden Bears | 2001 | 2007 | Field hockey | C. New England (CNE) |

=== Membership timeline ===
Full member (all sports) Full member (non-football) Associate member (football) Associate member (sport)

== Sports ==
A divisional format is used for baseball, basketball (M / W), softball, and volleyball (W).
East
- Husson
- Maine–Farmington
- Maine–Presque Isle
- Maine Maritime
- Thomas
West
- Lesley
- SUNY Cobleskill
- SUNY Delhi
- Vermont State–Johnson
- Vermont State–Lyndon

Conference sports
| Sport | Men's | Women's |
|---|---|---|
| Baseball | ✓ | |
| Basketball | ✓ | ✓ |
| Cross Country | ✓ | ✓ |
| Golf | ✓ | |
| Lacrosse | | ✓ |
| Soccer | ✓ | ✓ |
| Softball | | ✓ |
| Tennis | | ✓ |
| Track & Field (Outdoor) | ✓ | ✓ |
| Volleyball | | ✓ |

=== Men's sports ===
| School | Baseball | Basketball | Cross Country | Golf | Soccer | Track & Field (Outdoor) | Total NAC Sports |
|---|---|---|---|---|---|---|---|
| Husson | ✓ | ✓ | ✓ | ✓ | ✓ | ✓ | 6 |
| Lesley | ✓ | ✓ | ✓ | ✓ | ✓ | ✓ | 6 |
| Maine–Farmington | ✓ | ✓ | ✓ | ✓ | ✓ | ✓ | 6 |
| Maine Maritime | ✗ | ✓ | ✓ | ✓ | ✓ | ✗ | 4 |
| Maine–Presque Isle | ✓ | ✓ | ✓ | ✓ | ✓ | ✓ | 6 |
| Thomas | ✓ | ✓ | ✓ | ✗ | ✓ | ✓ | 5 |
| VTSU Johnson | ✗ | ✓ | ✗ | ✓ | ✓ | ✓ | 4 |
| VTSU Lyndon | ✓ | ✓ | ✓ | ✗ | ✓ | ✗ | 4 |
| Totals | 6 | 8 | 7 | 6 | 8 | 6 | 41 |

==== Men's varsity sports not sponsored by the NAC ====
| School | Alpine Skiing (Note: The NCAA operates a single coeducational skiing championship that incorporates both Alpine and Nordic. NCAA skiing is a de facto Division I sport, with the championship open to members of all divisions.) | Football | Lacrosse | Nordic Skiing | Rugby (Note: Not sponsored by the NCAA.) | Sailing | Snowboard | Swimming & Diving | Tennis | Track & Field (Indoor) | Volleyball | Wrestling |
|---|---|---|---|---|---|---|---|---|---|---|---|---|
| Husson | | CNE | MASCAC | | | | | LEC | | IND | | |
| Lesley | | | | | | | | | E8 | | | |
| Maine–Farmington | USCSA | | | USCSA | | | USCSA | | | IND | | |
| Maine Maritime | | CNE | MASCAC | | | ✓ | | LEC | | | | NEWA |
| Thomas | | | MASCAC | | NCR | | | | E8 | IND | | |
| VTSU Johnson | | | | | | | | | E8 | IND | CNE | |
| VTSU Lyndon | | | | | | | | | E8 | | | |

=== Women's sports ===
| School | Basketball | Cross Country | Lacrosse | Soccer | Softball | Tennis | Track & Field (Outdoor) | Volleyball | Total NAC Sports |
|---|---|---|---|---|---|---|---|---|---|
| Husson | ✓ | ✓ | ✓ | ✓ | ✓ | ✓ | ✓ | ✓ | 8 |
| Lesley | ✓ | ✓ | ✗ | ✓ | ✓ | ✓ | ✓ | ✓ | 7 |
| Maine–Farmington | ✓ | ✓ | ✓ | ✓ | ✓ | ✗ | ✓ | ✗ | 6 |
| Maine Maritime | ✓ | ✓ | ✓ | ✓ | ✗ | ✗ | ✗ | ✓ | 5 |
| Maine–Presque Isle | ✓ | ✓ | ✗ | ✓ | ✓ | ✗ | ✓ | ✓ | 6 |
| Thomas | ✓ | ✓ | ✓ | ✓ | ✓ | ✓ | ✓ | ✓ | 8 |
| VTSU Johnson | ✓ | ✗ | ✗ | ✓ | ✓ | ✓ | ✓ | ✓ | 6 |
| VTSU Lyndon | ✓ | ✓ | ✗ | ✓ | ✓ | ✓ | ✗ | ✓ | 6 |
| Totals | 8 | 7 | 4 | 8 | 7 | 5 | 6 | 7 | 52 |

==== Women's varsity sports not sponsored by the NAC ====
| School | Alpine Skiing (Note: The NCAA operates a single coeducational skiing championship that incorporates both Alpine and Nordic. NCAA skiing is a de facto Division I sport, with the championship open to members of all divisions.) | Field Hockey | Golf | Nordic Skiing | Rugby (Note: Part of the NCAA Emerging Sports for Women program.) | Sailing (Note: Not sponsored by the NCAA.) | Snowboard | Swimming & Diving | Track & Field (Indoor) | Wrestling (Note: De facto Division I sport through 2026–27, with the NCAA championship open to members of all divisions. A separate Division III championship will be established in 2027–28.) |
|---|---|---|---|---|---|---|---|---|---|---|
| Husson | | CMCFHC | NWGC | | | | | LEC | IND | |
| Maine–Farmington | USCSA | CMCFHC | | USCSA | | | USCSA | | IND | |
| Maine Maritime | | | | | | ✓ | | LEC | | IND |
| Thomas | | CMCFHC | | | NIRA | | | | IND | |
| VTSU Johnson | | | | | | | | | IND | |

== Championships ==
The NAC holds championships in the following sports:

- Fall season: men's and women's cross country, field hockey, golf, men's and women's soccer, women's tennis, women's volleyball
- Winter season: men's and women's basketball
- Spring season: baseball, men's lacrosse, softball, men's tennis
