= Alfred State College =

Public college in Alfred, New York, US

Coordinates: 42°15′15.71″N 77°47′18.38″W

- Former names: New York State School of Agriculture at Alfred University (1908–1936); Alfred Agricultural and Technical Institute (1936–1941); New York State Agricultural and Technical Institute (1941–1964); State University of New York Agricultural and Technical College at Alfred (1964–1985)
- Motto: Hit the ground running...
- Type: Public college
- Established: 1908; 118 years ago
- Parent institution: State University of New York
- President: Steven Mauro
- Undergraduates: 3,765 (fall 2025)
- Location: Alfred, New York, United States
- Campus: Rural 260 acres (1.1 km^{2})
- Colors: Blue and Gold
- Nickname: Pioneers
- Mascot: Big Blue
- Website: alfredstate.edu

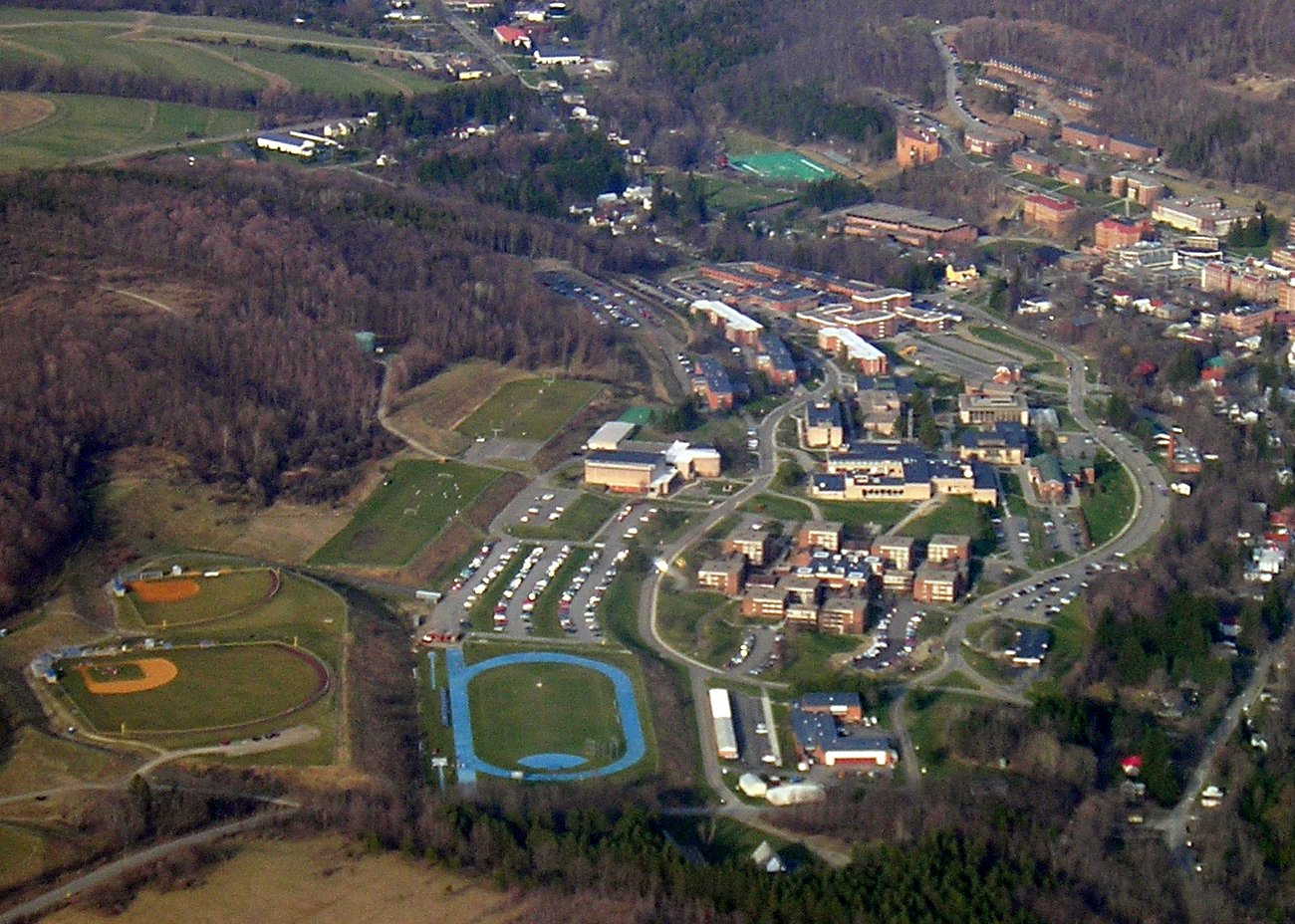
Aerial view of Alfred State taken in April 2006. Alfred University is shown in the upper right and Alfred, New York appears to the right

Alfred State College (ASC, SUNY Alfred, SUNY Alfred State, A-State) is a public college in Alfred, New York, United States. It is part of the State University of New York (SUNY) system. The college offers bachelor's and associate degree programs. It is accredited by the Middle States Commission on Higher Education and is a member of the Rochester Area Colleges consortium.

== History ==
Both Alfred University and Alfred State have their roots in an early teaching college called the Alfred Select School. The school was visionary in its equal opportunity policy. In 1908 President Boothe C. Davis of Alfred University persuaded the New York State legislature to locate the New York State School of Agriculture at the Alfred University Campus; the resulting allocation of $75,000 for three buildings, a farm, livestock, and machinery would set plans for the school in motion.

In 1937, the School of Engineering Technologies was founded by the original three academic faculty members; Al French, Bill Harrison and Herm Sickler. Four years later, the school was given junior college status and renamed the New York State Agricultural and Technical College at Alfred.

By 1948, increased enrollment was a reason for moving the school across Main Street, where it remains today.

== Schools and departments ==
Alfred State offers 80 majors in the arts, applied technology, architecture and management and engineering technology. Teaching staff are in a 17:1 ratio to students, and are generally well-educated in their field, while maintaining ties to their profession.

The college is divided into the following schools:

- The School of Arts & Sciences
- The School of Applied Technology (located at the Wellsville campus)
- The School of Architecture, Management and Engineering Technology

== Facilities and construction ==
Founded with three buildings, a farm, and some livestock, Alfred State has expanded to include 13 residence halls, state-of-the-art smart classrooms, a motorsports facility, an organic farm, the Orvis Activities Center, as well as a second campus of Applied Technology located in Wellsville, New York.

Pioneer Stadium accommodates soccer and football, and is surrounded by an eight-lane running track. Facilities also include a Central Dining Hall, a 150-bed townhouse complex, an Engineering Technology Building, and a Student Leadership Center.

== Student life ==
Undergraduate demographics as of Fall 2023
Race and ethnicity	Total
White	69%
Hispanic	13%
Black	12%
Two or more races	5%
Asian	1%
Economic diversity
Low-income (Note: The percentage of students who received an income-based federal Pell grant intended for low-income students.)	45%
Affluent (Note: The percentage of students who are a part of the American middle class at the bare minimum.)	55%

=== Student government ===
The Student Senate of Alfred State administers over half a million dollars in club and administrative funds through the Student Activity Fee. Student Senate supports, facilitates, and leads its clubs and organizations through an annual Leadership Retreat, weekly leadership seminars, and special projects. In addition to funding, Student Senate allows students of both Wellsville and Alfred main campus to participate in collaborative decision-making processes. The Student Senate General Assembly has voting rights on the board of trustees of the college, known as the College Council, through its College Council Representative. The Student Senate General Assembly also has a voice on the Faculty Senate with a non-voting member but has voting members on many committees including the Academic Affairs Committee. They also have three members on the Auxiliary Campus Enterprises and Services board of directors.

=== Greek life ===
There are several fraternities and sororities on campus.

== Museums and galleries ==
The Brent Llewellyn Art Gallery at SUNY Alfred State in Alfred, New York, founded in 2010, is located in the campus Engineering Technology Building.

== Athletics ==
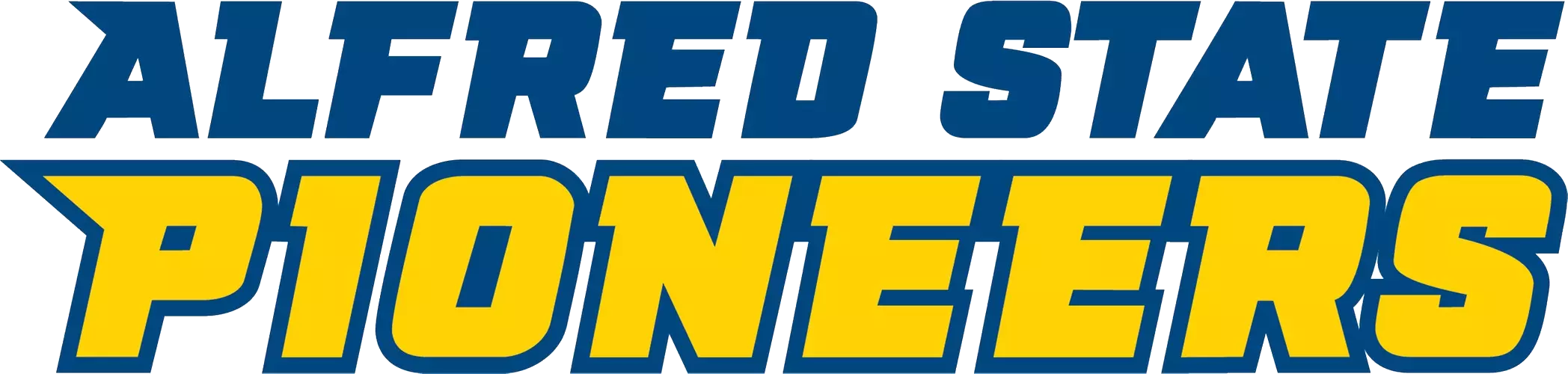
Alfred State athletics wordmark

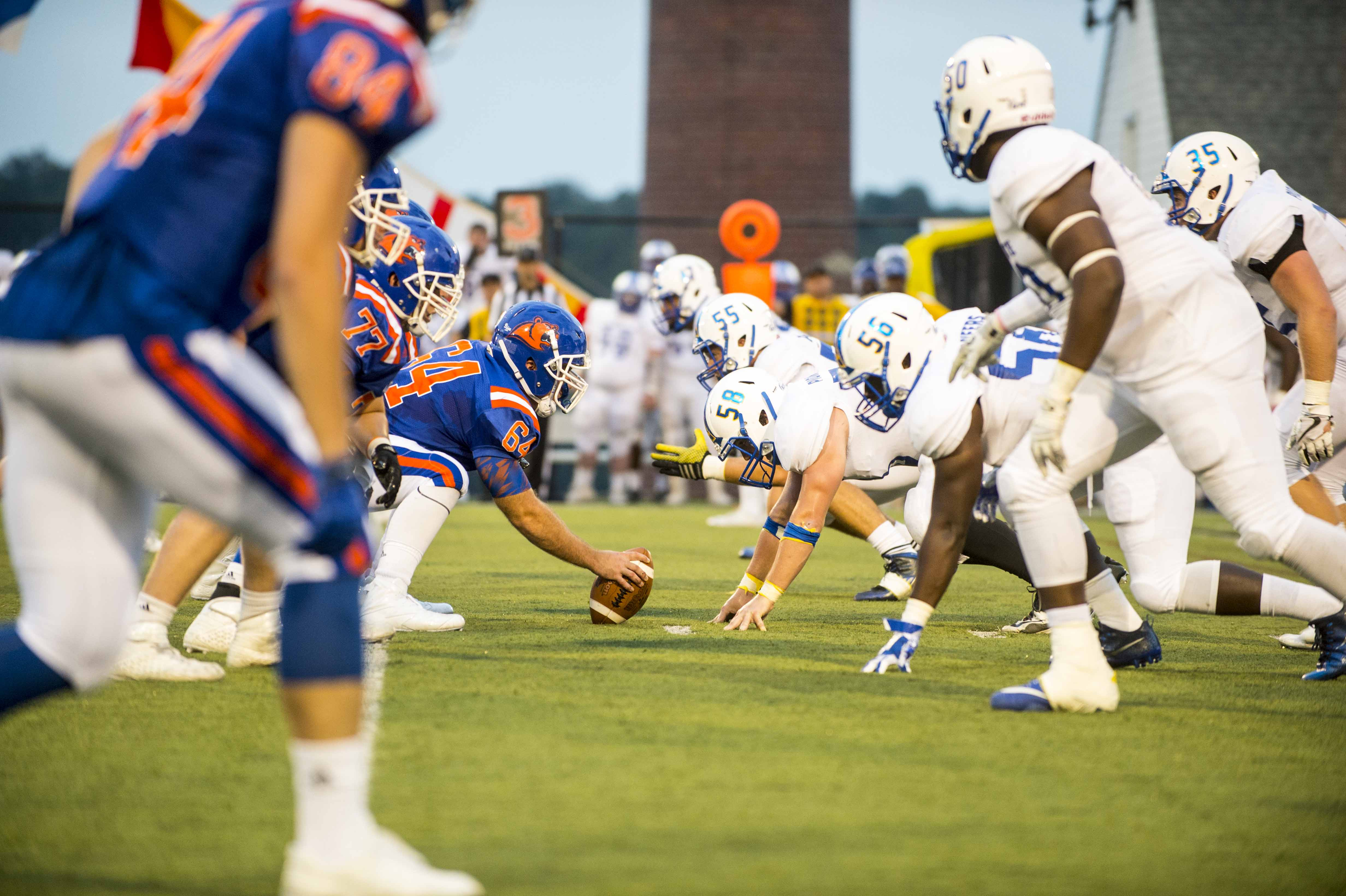
The Pioneers football team (right) lines up on defense during a 2017 game against the Coast Guard Bears

The Alfred State athletic teams are called the Pioneers. The college is a member of the Division III ranks of the National Collegiate Athletic Association (NCAA), primarily competing in the Allegheny Mountain Collegiate Conference (AMCC) for most of its sponsored sports since the 2019–20 academic year. The Pioneers also compete as a member of the Empire 8 for football, the State University of New York Athletic Conference (SUNYAC) for men's and women's indoor and outdoor track & field, and the Empire Collegiate Wrestling Conference (ECWC) for wrestling. They also previously competed in the short-lived American Collegiate Athletic Association (ACAA) from 2017–18 to 2018–19; and as an NCAA D-III Independent from 2013–14 to 2016–17.

Alfred State competes in 17 intercollegiate varsity sports. Men's sports include baseball, basketball, cross country, football, soccer, swimming & diving, track & field (indoor and outdoor) and wrestling; while women's sports include basketball, cross country, soccer, softball, swimming & diving, track & field (indoor and outdoor) and volleyball.
