= State University of New York at Delhi =

Public college in Delhi, New York, U.S.

Coordinates: 42°16′14″N 74°55′29″W

- Former names: State School of Agriculture and Domestic Science at Delhi (1913–1941); New York State Agricultural and Technical Institute at Delhi (1941–1964); New York Agricultural and Technical College at Delhi (1964–1987); State University of New York College of Technology at Delhi (1987–2002)
- Type: Public college
- Established: May 24, 1913; 113 years ago
- Parent institution: State University of New York
- Endowment: $7.8 million (2019)
- President: Mary Bonderoff
- Students: 3,061 (fall 2025)
- Undergraduates: 2,882 (fall 2025)
- Postgraduates: 179 (fall 2025)
- Location: Town of Delhi, New York, United States
- Campus: Rural 625 acres (2.53 km^{2})
- Colors: green, white, and gold
- Nickname: Broncos
- Sporting affiliations: NCAA Division III – NAC
- Mascot: Blaze the Bronco
- Website: www.delhi.edu

The State University of New York at Delhi (SUNY Delhi or Delhi State College) is a public college in Delhi, New York, United States. It is part of the State University of New York (SUNY) system. Over 3,000 students attend the institution.

SUNY Delhi offers over 60 programs, which can lead to certificates, associate degrees, bachelor's degrees, or master's degrees. There are five academic schools within the college: Veterinary and Applied Sciences, Applied Technologies, Business and Hospitality Management, Nursing, and Liberal Arts and Sciences. The college is accredited by the Middle States Commission on Higher Education.

== History ==
SUNY Delhi was founded on May 24, 1913, as a small agriculture school by two women, Amelia and Elizabeth MacDonald. Then known as the State School of Agriculture and Domestic Science, the college served students from all over New York.

By the late 1920s, the fledgling agricultural college began offering more general education and added dormitory buildings.

The school's name changed for the first time in 1941, becoming the New York State Agricultural and Technical Institute at Delhi, one of six state agricultural schools in New York. Seven years later, the school was absorbed into the newly-established State University of New York system.

Sixteen years after joining the SUNY system in 1948, the college changed its name for a third time, becoming the New York Agricultural and Technical College at Delhi. It was not until this period of the 1960s that the institution expanded to offer more programs of study like business, refrigeration, construction, and veterinary technology. Delhi also added several new academic buildings, more dorms, and a new dining hall.

The school changed names a fourth time in 1987, becoming the State University of New York College of Technology at Delhi.

The college began offering bachelor's degrees in the early 2000s. With this change, the school adopted its current name, State University of New York at Delhi, in 2002. With this upgrade came much expansion of the campus.

In 2018, the SUNY Delhi athletic program joined the NCAA Division III.

== Academics ==
SUNY Delhi offers over 60 programs of study, including several one-year certificate programs, 46 two-year associate degrees, 20 bachelor's degrees, and two master's degrees. Nine online degrees offered include one associate degree, six bachelor's degrees, and two master's degrees. Degree types offered include certificates which cover the industry basics for several trade-based programs (in areas like automotive mechanics, cabinet making, plumbing, heating, refrigeration, and more), Associate of Occupational Studies (AOS), Associate of Applied Sciences (AAS), Associate of Arts (AA), Associate of Science (AS), Bachelor of Business Administration (BBA), Bachelor of Technology (BT), Bachelor of Science (BS), Bachelor of Science in Nursing (BSN), and Master of Science in Nursing (MSN).

=== Online programs ===
SUNY Delhi offers several degrees with options for virtual study in associate, bachelor's and master's degrees. Current online offerings include an AOS in Electrical Construction and Instrumentation (IBEW), bachelor's degrees in Criminal Justice, Culinary Arts Management, Event Management, Hotel & Restaurant Management, Business and Technology Management and RN-to-BSN Nursing. The college's two master's degrees are offered online and are degrees in Nursing Administration or Nursing Education.

Based on a recent study by Intelligent.com, SUNY Delhi is among the nation's top-ranked institutions in 2020, offering the best online bachelor's programs in Hospitality Management, Criminal Justice, and Nursing RN-to-BSN. In the study, accredited programs were compared and ranked based on their reputation in their fields, course strength, flexibility, and cost.

=== Culinary Arts Program ===
SUNY Delhi's culinary team won the American Culinary Federation's New York State Student Team Championship in 2000, 01, 02, 03, 04, 05, 06, 07, 08, 2010, and 2012 the eighth year for Delhi to earn this title in the last 10 years. They have also won the ACF's Northeast Region Student Team Championship in 2001, 03, 07, 08, 2010 and 2012. In 2010 SUNY Delhi's culinary team was the first team from New York State to win the ACF's National Student Team Championship. The school won the National Championship again in 2012.

== Student life ==
Undergraduate demographics as of Fall 2023
| Race and ethnicity | Total |
|---|---|
| White | 56% |
| Hispanic | 19% |
| Black | 17% |
| Two or more races | 3% |
| Unknown | 3% |
| Asian | 2% |
Economic diversity
| Low-income (Note: The percentage of students who received an income-based federal Pell grant intended for low-income students.) | 47% |
| Affluent (Note: The percentage of students who are a part of the American middle class at the bare minimum.) | 53% |

=== Campus housing ===
SUNY Delhi has a two-year live-in requirement with possible exceptions. To accommodate students SUNY Delhi operates six residence halls (Dubois Hall, Gerry Hall, Murphy Hall, O'Connor Hall and Russell Hall) on-campus and one townhouse complex (Riverview Townhouses) just off-campus in the village of Delhi. Student are housed by legal sex primarily in double occupancy rooms with a limited number of single occupancy rooms available primarily for upper-class standing students. Russell Hall is the largest residence hall holding nearly 500 students and is home the Veterinary Science, Nursing and LGTBQ+ Ally living learning communities. Dubois Hall and Gerry Hall are sister buildings, and hold approximately 236 and 200 students respectfully. Murphy Hall and O'Connor Hall, another set of sister building, house approximately 270 students each. O'Connor Hall houses the First-Year Experience program and accordingly houses only first-year students. Catskill Hall houses only upper-class standing students and provides suite-style housing with suites housing six students. Each suite contains a shower room and bathroom, and a living room area. The Riverview Townhouses consist of two-story townhouses housing six to eight students in a combination of double rooms and single rooms. All townhouses contain a kitchen, a living room, and two bathrooms. Laundry facilities are available in all residential facilities and are free to use, paid for by the housing fee. Student positions are available for Resident Assistants.

=== Clubs and activities ===
There are over forty clubs and organizations on campus, as well as sixteen recognized and several unrecognized Greek organizations. The student activities office is located in the upper level of the Farrell Student and Community Center.

=== Student Senate ===
The student senate meets every Wednesday at 5:15 sharp in the Farrell Student and Community Center room 211/212. Although each club or organization on campus is represented with an elected senator, any student is welcome to come to the senate meetings and voice their interest. The student senate office is located in the bottom, club office portion of Farrell, in room 32. If the officers are out of the office, further interest can be addressed in the student activities office, also located in the Farrell Student and Community Center.

== Athletics ==
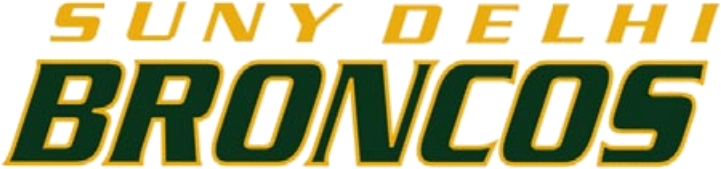
SUNY Delhi Broncos wordmark

The SUNY Delhi athletic teams are called the Broncos. Their mascot is Blaze the Bronco. The university is a member of the NCAA Division III ranks, primarily competing in the North Atlantic Conference (NAC) since the 2019–20 academic year (for most sports, with basketball and softball following suit in 2020–21). They also competed as a member of the United States Collegiate Athletic Association (USCAA) from 2015–16 to about 2019–20. The Broncos previously competed in the short-lived D-III American Collegiate Athletic Association (ACAA) from 2017–18 to 2018–19; as an NAIA Independent within the Association of Independent Institutions (AII) from 2008–09 to 2016–17; and in the Mountain Valley Athletic Conference (MVAC) of the National Junior College Athletic Association (NJCAA) during the 2000s until after the 2014–15 school year. Prior to 2015, the Broncos were members of the NJCAA, where they collected 21 national titles in men's and women's cross country and track & field.

SUNY Delhi competes in 17 intercollegiate varsity sports: Men's sports include basketball, cross country, golf, lacrosse, soccer, swimming & diving, tennis and track & field. Women's sports include basketball, cross country, golf, soccer, softball, swimming & diving, tennis, track & field and volleyball.

The men's cross country earned the school's first four-year national title when they won the 2016 USCAA Championship, and repeated as champions in 2017. That same year, the men's golf team won the college's first national team title outside of cross country and track & field at the USCAA Championships.

=== Facilities ===
Kunsela Hall Aquatics Center, located in the agora on the main campus, houses the pool. This building went through renovations during the Fall 2011 semester and has since re-opened.

Clark Field house, located at the highest point on the main campus, has several features which contribute to Delhi's athletic success. Attached to this building, the "Bubble," is a dome which allows the space for indoor track and soccer practices, as well as mobile tennis nets and basketball hoops. Also in Clark Field house is the CADI Fitness Center, including traditional weight lifting options, recumbent bicycles, ellipticals, and treadmills, as well as equipment available for rent. The athletic offices are also located in this building, as well as the Floyd L. Maines Arena – often used for games, concerts, and other school functions.

There are a variety of outdoor spaces available as well, including a track, soccer field, racquetball courts, tennis courts, and basketball courts. The Delhi College Golf Course is located in the valley portion of the campus.

Farrell Student and Community Center has a dance and aerobics room on its main floor, where free yoga, pilates, and dance classes are regularly held.

== Notable alumni ==
- Alison Esposito, NYPD cop, politician
- Peter Oberacker, New York State Senator, Class of 1983
- Bill Pullman, actor
- Eric Weinrib, 2021 Alumnus of Merit award recipient, documentary filmmaker
