= Coast to Coast Athletic Conference =

American college athletic conference

- Formerly: Capital Athletic Conference (CAC)
- Association: NCAA
- Founded: 1989
- Commissioner: Chris Roekle (since 2020)
- Sports fielded: 16; men's: 7; women's: 9
- Division: Division III
- No. of teams: 8
- Website: www.c2csports.com

Locations
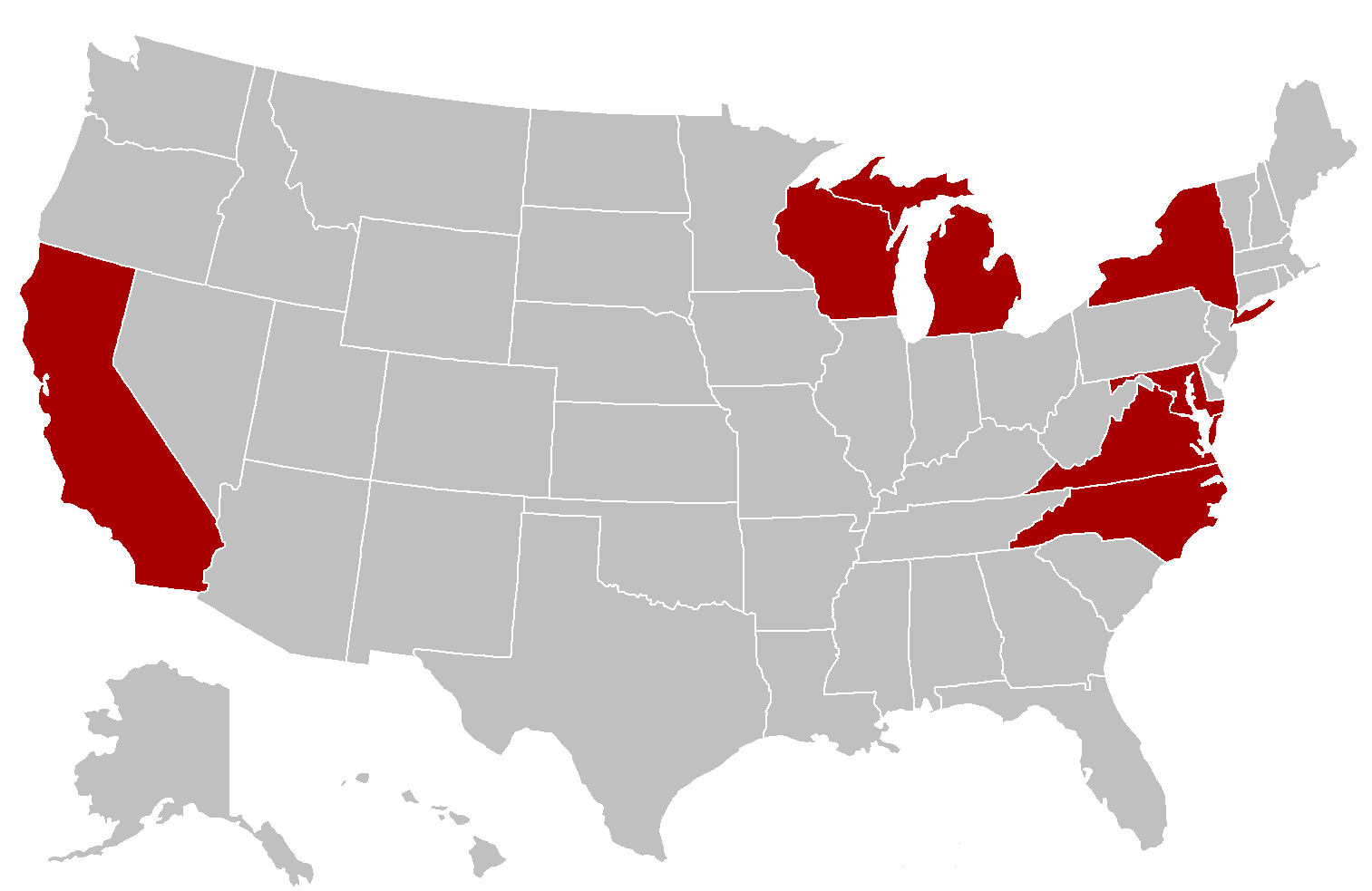

The Coast to Coast Athletic Conference (C2C; officially stylized as Coast-to-Coast Athletic Conference), formerly named Capital Athletic Conference (CAC), is an intercollegiate athletic conference affiliated with the NCAA's Division III. Member institutions are located throughout the United States in the states of California, Maryland, North Carolina and Virginia.

== History ==
Capital Athletic Conference Charter Members locations
– charter members

Formed in 1989 as Capital Athletic Conference (CAC), the charter members were The Catholic University of America, Gallaudet University, the University of Mary Washington, Marymount University, St. Mary's College of Maryland, and York College of Pennsylvania.

On May 6, 2011, Hood and Stevenson departed the CAC for the Middle Atlantic Conferences, effective June 1, 2012. Both Hood and Stevenson would also compete on some sports within the multi-conference umbrella as part of the MAC's Commonwealth Conference.

On July 26, 2012, Christopher Newport University, Penn State Harrisburg and Southern Virginia University joined the CAC for all sports in the 2013–14 academic year, effective on June 1, 2013.

On March 1, 2018, Marymount and Wesley departed the CAC for the newly-formed Atlantic East Conference (AEC) following the end the 2017–18 academic year.

On July 5, 2018, Frostburg State began the transition to the Division II for the 2019–20 academic year, thus departed the CAC to join the Mountain East Conference, effective after the 2018–19 academic year.

On July 8, 2018, Penn State Harrisburg departed the CAC to return to the NEAC following the end of the 2018–19 academic year.

On April 2, 2019, York departed the CAC to join the MAC, effective after the 2019–20 season.

On December 11, 2019, Southern Virginia departed the C2C to join the USA South Athletic Conference, effective after the 2020–21 academic year.

On December 12, 2019, St. Mary's departed the C2C to join the United East Conference, effective after the 2020–21 academic year.

On May 26, 2020, it was announced that the Capital Athletic Conference would expand to 11 teams as they offered memberships to all schools in the American Collegiate Athletic Association. All full ACAA members and an associate member joined the CAC in the 2020–21 school year; the announcement also stated that the expanded CAC planned to adopt a new name. The post-merger conference does not conduct regular-season competition in any sports; members establish their own schedules, with NCAA championship bids handed out in conference tournaments or championship meets, depending on the sport. Therefore, all full members, the University of California, Santa Cruz, Finlandia University, Mills College (women's sports only), Mount Mary University (women's sports only), Pine Manor College, and Pratt Institute, and associate member, the University of Wisconsin–Whitewater, of the ACAA joined in their respective memberships.

On November 18, 2020, the Capital Athletic Conference announced its rebranding as the "Coast to Coast Athletic Conference".

On March 17, 2021, Mills announced that it would end conferment degrees to become a research institution after the 2022–23 school year, thus dissolving their athletic programs. This was later revised to be acquired by Northeastern University to become Northeastern University at Mills College. Through this merger, Mills transitioned to a co-ed university and would discontinue athletics after the 2021–22 season.

On August 4, 2021, St. Mary's rejoined the C2C as an associate member in men's and women's indoor and outdoor track & field.

On January 11, 2022, the University of Wisconsin–Platteville joined the C2C as an associate member for men's soccer, starting in the 2022 fall season (2022–23 academic year).

On July 26, 2022, the C2C announced that it would form the Coastal Lacrosse Conference, a single sport, men's lacrosse conference, with the New Jersey Athletic Conference. The members would include Christopher Newport University, Salisbury University, and University of Mary Washington from the C2C and Kean University, Montclair State University, and Stockton University from the NJAC. Play began in the 2022–23 season.

On July 27, 2022, the C2C announced the addition of Warren Wilson College as a full member starting in the 2022–23 season.

On March 2, 2023, Finlandia University announced that it would close following the 2022–23 school year, thus departing the conference.

=== Chronological timeline ===
Current Coast-to-Coast Athletic Conference Member locations
– Full member
- 1989 – The Capital Athletic Conference (CAC) was founded. Charter members included The Catholic University of America, Gallaudet University, Mary Washington College (now the University of Mary Washington), Marymount University, St. Mary's College of Maryland, and York College of Pennsylvania, beginning in the 1989–90 academic year.
- 1991 – Salisbury State University (now Salisbury University) joined the CAC in the 1991–92 academic year.
- 1993 – Goucher College joined the CAC in the 1993–94 academic year.
- 2005 – Catholic and Goucher left the CAC for the newly-formed Landmark Conference after the 2006–07 academic year.
- 2006 – Hood College and Villa Julie College (now Stevenson University) joined the CAC for some sports in the 2006–07 academic year.
- 2007 – Wesley College joined the CAC for all sports (along with Hood and Stevenson) in the 2007–08 academic year.
- 2010
  - Gallaudet left the CAC to join the North Eastern Athletic Conference (NEAC; now the United East Conference) after the 2009–10 academic year.
  - Frostburg State University joined the CAC in the 2010–11 academic year.
- 2012 – Hood and Stevenson left the CAC for the Commonwealth Conference within the Middle Atlantic Conferences (MAC) after the 2011–12 academic year.
- 2013
  - Christopher Newport University, Pennsylvania State University at Harrisburg—Capital College (Penn State–Harrisburg) and Southern Virginia University joined the CAC in the 2013–14 academic year.
  - William Paterson University and New Jersey City University joined the CAC as associate members for men's golf in the 2014 spring season (2013–14 academic year).
- 2016 – William Paterson left from the CAC as an associate member for men's golf after the 2016 spring season (2015–16 academic year).
- 2018
  - Marymount and Wesley (Del.) left the CAC for the newly-formed Atlantic East Conference (AEC) after the 2017–18 academic year.
  - Babson College joined the CAC as an associate member for men's golf in the 2019 spring season (2018–19 academic year).
- 2019
  - Frostburg State began the transition to the NCAA Division II ranks (beginning the 2019–20 academic year), thus departed the CAC to join the Mountain East Conference (MEC) after the 2018–19 academic year.
  - Penn State–Harrisburg left the CAC to return to the NEAC after the 2018–19 academic year.
  - Carnegie Mellon University joined the CAC as an associate member for men's golf in the 2020 spring season (2019–20 academic year).
- 2020
  - York (Pa.) left the CAC to join the MAC after the 2019–20 academic year.
  - The C2C dropped men's and women's swimming and golf as conference sports after the 2019–20 academic year; therefore, men's golf associates (Babson, Carnegie Mellon and New Jersey City) had departed.
  - The CAC announced that it would absorb the American Collegiate Athletic Association (ACAA), beginning in the 2020–21 academic year. Therefore, all full members (the University of California, Santa Cruz, Finlandia University, Mills College (women's sports only), Mount Mary University (women's sports only), Pine Manor College and Pratt Institute) and associate member (the University of Wisconsin–Whitewater) of the ACAA joined in their respective memberships.
  - The CAC announced that it would rebrand as the Coast-to-Coast Athletic Conference (C2C) during the 2020–21 academic year.
- 2021
  - St. Mary's left the C2C to join the United East Conference after the 2020–21 academic year; while it would later rejoined to the conference as an associate member in men's and women's indoor and outdoor track & field in the 2022 spring season (2021–22 academic year).
  - Southern Virginia left the C2C to join the USA South Athletic Conference (USA South) after the 2020–21 academic year.
  - Pine Manor left the C2C as it was acquired by Boston College, thus dissolving their athletics programs, after the 2020–21 academic year.
- 2022
  - Mills left the C2C to become a research institution, thus dissolving their athletics programs, after the 2021–22 academic year.
  - The University of Wisconsin–Platteville joined the C2C as an associate member for men's soccer in the 2022 fall season (2022–23 academic year).
  - The C2C, alongside the New Jersey Athletic Conference (NJAC), announced that it would form the Coastal Lacrosse Conference (CLC), beginning in the 2023 spring season (2022–23 academic year). Therefore, the conference no longer sponsors men's lacrosse.
  - Warren Wilson College joined the C2C in the 2022–23 academic year.
- 2023 – Finlandia left the C2C after the 2022–23 academic year; due to announcing its closure.
- 2024 – Pratt left the C2C to join the AEC after the 2023–24 academic year.
- 2025
  - Mount Mary left the C2C and the NCAA to begin a transition to the National Association of Intercollegiate Athletics (NAIA) and the Chicagoland Collegiate Athletic Conference (CCAC) after the 2024–25 academic year.
  - Johnson & Wales University—Charlotte and Regent University joined the C2C in the 2025–26 academic year.
- 2026 – Alverno College joined the C2C, beginning in the 2026–27 academic year.

== Member schools ==
=== Current members ===
The C2C currently has eight full members, four are public schools and four are private schools:

Institution	Location	Founded	Affiliation	Enrollment	Nickname	Colors	Joined (Note: Represents the calendar year when fall sports competition begins.)
Alverno College (Note: Alverno is a women's college, therefore it does not compete in men's sports.)	Milwaukee, Wisconsin	1887	Catholic (S.S.S.F.)	1,317	Inferno		2026
Christopher Newport University	Newport News, Virginia	1961	Public	4,454	Captains		2013
Johnson & Wales University–Charlotte	Charlotte, North Carolina	1914 (Note: Johnson & Wales University has been in operation since 1914, but its Charlotte campus has only been active since 2004.)	Nonsectarian	1,184	Wildcats		2025
University of Mary Washington	Fredericksburg, Virginia	1908	Public	3,826	Eagles		1989
Regent University	Virginia Beach, Virginia	1977	Interdenominational (Evangelical)	10,657	Royals		2025
Salisbury University	Salisbury, Maryland	1925	Public (Note: Part of the University System of Maryland.)	7,025	Sea Gulls		1993
University of California, Santa Cruz	Santa Cruz, California	1965	Public (Note: Part of the University of California System.)	19,938	Banana Slugs		2020
Warren Wilson College	Swannanoa, North Carolina	1894	Presbyterian (PCUSA)	791	Owls		2022

=== Former members ===
The C2C had 17 former full members, all but three were private schools:

Institution	Location	Founded	Affiliation	Nickname	Joined (Note: Represents the calendar year when fall sports competition begins.)	Left (Note: Represents the calendar year when spring sports competition ends.)	Current conference
The Catholic University of America	Washington, D.C.	1887	Catholic (Pontifical)	Cardinals	1989	2007	Landmark
Finlandia University	Hancock, Michigan	1896	Lutheran (ELCA)	Lions	2020	2023	None (Note: Finlandia closed following the 2022-23 school year.)
Frostburg State University	Frostburg, Maryland	1898	Public (Note: Part of the University System of Maryland.)	Bobcats	2010	2019	Mountain East (MEC) (Note: Currently an NCAA Division II athletic conference.)
Gallaudet University	Washington, D.C.	1864	Quasigovernmental	Bison	1989	2010	United East (UEC)
Goucher College	Towson, Maryland	1885	Nonsectarian	Gophers	1989	2007	Landmark
Hood College	Frederick, Maryland	1893	United Church of Christ	Blazers	2007 (Note: Hood joined the CAC as an associate member for certain sports during the 2006-07 school year. The sports that competed were the following: men's sports included basketball, cross country, lacrosse, soccer, swimming, tennis and track & field, and women's sports included cross country, swimming, tennis and track & field (while the rest of its other women's sports were still competing in the Atlantic Women's Colleges Conference (AWCC) at that time.)	2012	MAC Commonwealth
Marymount University	Arlington, Virginia	1950	Catholic (RSHM)	Saints	1989	2018	Atlantic East (AEC)
Mills College (Note: This institution was a women's college, therefore it did not compete in men's sports.)	Oakland, California	1852	Nonsectarian	Cyclones	2020	2022	None (Note: Mills was acquired by Northeastern University in 2023, becoming part of that university's extended operations in the San Francisco Bay Area. In advance of this, Mills dropped athletics after the 2021–22 school year.)
Mount Mary University	Milwaukee, Wisconsin	1913	Catholic (SSND)	Blue Angels	2020	2025	Chicagoland (CCAC) (Note: Currently an NAIA athletic conference.)
Penn State Harrisburg	Lower Swatara, Pennsylvania	1966	Public	Lions	2013	2019	United East (UEC)
Pine Manor College	Chestnut Hill, Massachusetts	1911	Nonsectarian	Gators	2020	2021	None (Note: Pine Manor was acquired by Boston College in 2021.)
Pratt Institute	Brooklyn, New York	1877	Nonsectarian	Cannoneers	2020	2024	Atlantic East (AEC) (CUNYAC in 2027)
St. Mary's College of Maryland	St. Mary's City, Maryland	1840	Public	Seahawks	1989	2021	United East (UEC)
Southern Virginia University	Buena Vista, Virginia	1867	LDS Church	Knights	2013	2021	USA South
Stevenson University	Stevenson, Maryland	1947	Nonsectarian	Mustangs	2007 (Note: Stevenson joined the CAC as an associate member for certain sports during the 2006-07 school year. The sports that competed were the following: men's sports included lacrosse, and women's sports included field hockey and lacrosse (while the rest of its other men's and women's sports were still competing in the North Eastern Athletic Conference (NEAC) at that time.)	2012	MAC Commonwealth
Wesley College	Dover, Delaware	1873	United; Methodist	Wolverines	2007	2018	None (Note: Wesley was acquired by Delaware State University in 2021.)
York College of Pennsylvania	York, Pennsylvania	1787	Nonsectarian	Spartans	1989	2020	MAC Commonwealth

=== Former associate members ===
The C2C had nine former associate members, five were public schools and four were private schools:

Institution	Location	Founded	Affiliation	Nickname	Joined (Note: Represents the calendar year when fall sports competition begins.)	Left (Note: Represents the calendar year when spring sports competition ends.)	C2C sport	Primary conference
Babson College	Wellesley, Massachusetts	1919	Nonsectarian	Beavers	2018	2020	men's golf	New England (NEWMAC)
Carnegie Mellon University	Pittsburgh, Pennsylvania	1900	Nonsectarian	Tartans	2019	2020	men's golf (Note: Carnegie Mellon joined as an associate member in the 2019–20 school year, which was cancelled due to the COVID-19 pandemic. Then men's golf was dropped as a conference sport after the 2019–20 school year, therefore Carnegie Mellon never participated in a conference championship.)	University (UAA)
The Catholic University of America (Note: Catholic (D.C.) was a full member of the C2C (back then, the CAC) from 1989–90 to 2006–07.)	Washington, D.C.	1887	Catholic (Pontifical)	Cardinals	2007	2008	women's outdoor track & field	Landmark
Goucher College (Note: Goucher was a full member of the C2C (back then, the CAC) from 1989–90 to 2006–07.)	Towson, Maryland	1885	Nonsectarian	Gophers	2007	2008	women's outdoor track & field	Landmark
New Jersey City University	Jersey City, New Jersey	1929	Public	Gothic Knights	2013	2020	men's golf	New Jersey (NJAC)
St. Mary's College of Maryland (Note: St. Mary's (Md.) was a full member of the C2C (back then, the CAC) from 1989–90 to 2020–21.)	St. Mary's City, Maryland	1840	Public	Seahawks	2021	2023	men's indoor track & field	United East (UEC)
St. Mary's College of Maryland	St. Mary's City, Maryland	1840	Public	Seahawks	2021	2023	men's outdoor track & field	United East (UEC)
St. Mary's College of Maryland	St. Mary's City, Maryland	1840	Public	Seahawks	2021	2023	women's indoor track & field	United East (UEC)
St. Mary's College of Maryland	St. Mary's City, Maryland	1840	Public	Seahawks	2021	2023	women's outdoor track & field	United East (UEC)
William Paterson University	Wayne, New Jersey	1855	Public	Pioneers	2013	2016	men's golf	New Jersey (NJAC)
University of Wisconsin–Platteville	Platteville, Wisconsin	1866	Public (Note: Part of the University of Wisconsin System.)	Pioneers	2022	2024	men's soccer	Wisconsin (WIAC)
University of Wisconsin–Whitewater	Whitewater, Wisconsin	1868	Public	Warhawks	2020	2024	men's soccer	Wisconsin (WIAC)

=== Membership timeline ===
Full member (all sports) Full member (non-football) Associate member (football) Associate member (sport)

== Sports ==
The C2C sponsors championships in the following sports:

Conference sports
Sport	Men's	Women's
Baseball	✓	
Basketball	✓	✓
Cross country	✓	✓
Lacrosse	(Note: In 2022, C2C and NJAC announced the creation of the Coastal Lacrosse Conference, an NCAA Division III single-sport men's lacrosse conference between members from the two conferences.)	✓
Soccer	✓	✓
Softball		✓
Tennis	✓	✓
Track and field (indoor)	✓	✓
Track and field (outdoor)	✓	✓
Volleyball		✓

=== Men's sponsored sports by school ===
School	Baseball	Basketball	Cross country	Soccer	Tennis	Track & field (indoor)	Track & field (outdoor)	Total C2C Sports
UC Santa Cruz	✗	✓	✓	✓	✓	✓	✓	6
Christopher Newport	✓	✓	✓	✓	✓	✓	✓	7
Johnson & Wales–Charlotte	✓	✓	✓	✓	✓	✗	✗	5
Mary Washington	✓	✓	✓	✓	✓	✓	✓	7
Regent	✓	✓	✓	✓	✗	✓	✓	6
Salisbury	✓	✓	✓	✓	✓	✓	✓	7
Warren Wilson	✗	✓	✓	✓	✗	✓	✓	5
Totals	5	7	7	7	5	6	6	43

==== Men's varsity sports not sponsored by the C2C that are played by C2C schools ====
School	Cycling	Equestrian	Football	Golf	Lacrosse	Rugby	Sailing	Swimming & Diving	Volleyball
UC Santa Cruz								PCSC	Independent
Christopher Newport			NJAC	Independent	CLC		MAISA		
Johnson & Wales–Charlotte				Independent					
Mary Washington		IHSA (Note: Mary Washington's equestrian programs are not sponsored by the NCAA but through the Intercollegiate Horse Show Association.)			CLC	CCRC		NJAC	
Regent									Independent
Salisbury			NJAC		CLC			NJAC	
Warren Wilson	HC				CLC			Independent	Independent

=== Women's sponsored sports by school ===
School	Basketball	Cross country	Lacrosse (Note: Women's lacrosse will be in danger of not being eligible for NCAA championship bids in the 2023–24 season if new members teams do not join C2C in those sports. According to the NCAA rules for a conference sport to be considered for NCAA championship bids there must be five or more teams competing in that sport, which all of the sports listed had four teams or less fielding that sport after the 2020–21 season.)	Soccer	Softball	Tennis	Track & field (indoor)	Track & field (outdoor)	Volleyball	Total C2C Sports
Alverno	✓	✓	✗	✓	✓	✗	✓	✓	✓	7
UC Santa Cruz	✓	✓	✗	✓	✗	✓	✓	✓	✓	7
Christopher Newport	✓	✓	✓	✓	✓	✓	✓	✓	✓	9
Johnson & Wales–Charlotte	✓	✓	✗	✓	✓	✓	✓	✓	✓	8
Mary Washington	✓	✓	✓	✓	✓	✓	✓	✓	✓	9
Regent	✓	✓	✗	✓	✗	✗	✓	✓	✓	6
Salisbury	✓	✓	✓	✓	✓	✓	✓	✓	✓	9
Warren Wilson	✓	✓	✓	✓	✗	✗	✓	✓	✓	7
Totals	8	8	4	8	5	5	8	8	8	62

==== Women's varsity sports not sponsored by C2C that are played by C2C schools ====
School	Beach Volleyball	Cheerleading	Cycling	Dance	Equestrian (Note: Part of the NCAA Emerging Sports for Women program.)	Field Hockey	Golf	Triathlon	Rugby	Sailing	Swimming & diving
UC Santa Cruz							ASC				PCSC
Christopher Newport		NCA		NCA		Independent	Colonial Women's Golf Conference			MAISA	
Johnson & Wales–Charlotte							Colonial Women's Golf Conference				
Mary Washington					IHSA (Note: While equestrian is recognized by the NCAA as one of its "Emerging Sports for Women", the NCAA does not sponsor a championship in that sport. Championships are organized by the Intercollegiate Horse Show Association.)	CFHC			CRU		NJAC
Regent	Independent										
Salisbury						SUNYAC	Colonial Women's Golf Conference				NJAC
Warren Wilson			HC					Independent	NIRA		Independent

== Current champions ==
The table below shows the current list of champions for the C2C/CAC championships.

Season	Sport	Women's Champion	Men's Champion
Fall 2025	Cross Country	UC Santa Cruz	UC Santa Cruz
Fall 2025	Soccer	Christopher Newport	Christopher Newport
Fall 2025	Volleyball	Christopher Newport	—N/a
Winter 2025–26	Basketball	Christopher Newport	Mary Washington
Winter 2025–26	Indoor Track & Field	Christopher Newport	Christopher Newport
Spring 2026	Baseball	—N/a	Salisbury
Spring 2026	Lacrosse	—N/a	Salisbury
Spring 2026	Softball	Christopher Newport	—N/a
Spring 2026	Tennis	Christopher Newport	Mary Washington
Spring 2026	Outdoor Track and Field	UC Santa Cruz	Salisbury
