= Mount Mary University =

Catholic women's university in Milwaukee, Wisconsin, US

Coordinates: 43.0720°N 88.0309°W

- Former names: St. Mary's Institute (1872–1913); St. Mary's College (1913–1928); Mount Mary College (1928–2013)
- Type: Private women's university
- Established: 1913; 113 years ago
- Religious affiliation: Roman Catholic
- President: Isabelle Cherney
- Undergraduates: 1,209
- Postgraduates: 529
- Location: Milwaukee, Wisconsin, United States
- Colors: Blue and White
- Nickname: Blue Angels
- Sporting affiliations: NAIA – CCAC
- Website: mtmary.edu

Mount Mary University is a private Catholic women's university in Milwaukee, Wisconsin, United States. The university was founded in 1913 by the School Sisters of Notre Dame and was Wisconsin's first four-year, degree-granting Catholic college for women. Today, the university serves women at the undergraduate level and both women and men at the graduate level.

The university enrolls nearly 1,500 students and offers bachelor's degrees in more than 30 academic majors, as well as eight master's and doctoral degree programs. Post-baccalaureate certificate programs also are offered. Mount Mary is accredited by the Higher Learning Commission of the North Central Association of Colleges and Schools.

== History ==
=== Founding and name changes ===
Mount Mary University traces its roots to 1872, when the School Sisters of Notre Dame established St. Mary's Institute in Prairie du Chien, Wisconsin. In 1913, the school introduced a college curriculum and was renamed St. Mary's College, chartered by the state of Wisconsin to grant degrees. It was the first four-year Catholic college for women in Wisconsin.

In 1926, the Archbishop of the Archdiocese of Milwaukee requested that St. Mary's College move to Milwaukee to make Catholic education available to a wider group of students. An 80-acre campus was purchased on the west side of Milwaukee. On September 12, 1928, the cornerstone of the new campus was laid and the school was renamed Mount Mary College. The college opened its doors to students in 1929.

In July 2013, the college changed its name to Mount Mary University.

=== Presidents ===
The following individuals have served as Mount Mary's president:

- Mother M. Seraphia Minges, SSND (1913-1922)
- Mother M. Angela Schott, SSND (1922-1929)
- Edward Fitzpatrick (1929-1954)
- Sister Mary John Francis Schuh, SSND (1954-1969)
- Sister Mary Nora Barber, SSND (1969-1979)
- Sister Ellen Lorenz, SSND (1979-1987)
- Sister Ruth Hollenbach, SSND (1987-1995)
- Sally Mahoney (interim president, 1995-1997)
- Patricia O'Donoghue (1997-2006)
- Linda Timm (2006-2008)
- Eileen Schwalbach (2009–2017)
- Christine Pharr (2017–2022)
- Isabelle Cherney (2022–present)

== Academics ==
Mount Mary has a student body of nearly 1,500. The faculty-to-student ratio is 1:15. Mount Mary is accredited by the Higher Learning Commission.

Mount Mary offers a liberal arts foundation with more than thirty undergraduate majors leading to a Bachelor of Arts or Bachelor of Science degree. The university also offers eight graduate programs, including: Professional Doctorate of Art Therapy, Master of Science in Art Therapy, Master of Business Administration, Master of Science in Counseling, Master of Science in Dietetics, Master of Arts in Education, Master of Arts in English, and Master of Science in Occupational Therapy. Post-baccalaureate certificate programs, as well as a post-baccalaureate Dietetic Internship program, also are offered.

Mount Mary also offers a dual degree program in partnership with the Medical College of Wisconsin. Through this program, students can earn a dual Baccalaureate and Master of Public Health degrees in five years.

=== Undergraduate programs ===
Mount Mary's core curriculum consists of studies in philosophy/theology, communication/math, humanistics, literature/fine arts, and science. The core courses "provide breadth within the liberal arts by allowing students to construct an understanding of the perspectives that each of the disciplines offers in each person's lifelong search for meaning."

In addition to the core curriculum, undergraduate students select a major in which to specialize. Mount Mary launched the first four-year fashion design and merchandising degree program in the nation in 1965. The most popular majors currently at Mount Mary are dietetics, fashion design, fashion merchandise management, interior design, occupational therapy, and social work.

Several Mount Mary undergraduate programs are accredited by their fields' accreditation body. The social work undergraduate degree program was the first private college in Wisconsin to have its baccalaureate program accredited by the Council on Social Work Education, and continues to be accredited today. The interior design program has been accredited by the Council for Interior Design Accreditation since 1986. Mount Mary's undergraduate dietetics program is accredited by the Academy of Nutrition and Dietetics' Accreditation Council for Education in Nutrition and Dietetics. The occupational therapy program has been accredited by the American Occupational Therapy Association's Accreditation Council for Occupational Therapy Education since 1943.

=== Graduate programs ===
Mount Mary offers seven master's degree programs and one doctoral degree program. In 1982, Mount Mary launched its first graduate program, the Master of Science in Dietetics program. In 1990, Mount Mary launched its Master of Science in Art Therapy and Master of Arts in Education: Professional Development degree programs. The Master of Science in Art Therapy program has been accredited by the American Art Therapy Association since 1995.

The Master of Science in Occupational Therapy program is accredited by the American Occupational Therapy Association's Accreditation Council for Occupational Therapy Education.

The Master of Arts in English program began in 2006. Mount Mary launched its Master of Business Administration program in 2008. The Professional Doctorate of Art Therapy program was launched in 2011, and was the first program of its kind in the United States.

== Campus ==
Mount Mary University is located on an 80-acre (32 ha) campus on the west side of Milwaukee, Wisconsin.

=== Notre Dame Hall and Caroline Hall ===
The first two buildings on the Mount Mary campus, Notre Dame Hall and Caroline Hall, opened in 1929. Notre Dame Hall housed classrooms and administrative offices. Caroline Hall served as the student residence hall. Both buildings have had many updates throughout the years, but continue to house classrooms, administrative offices, and student residences.

=== Fidelis Hall and Kostka Hall ===
In May 1953, ground was broken for Fidelis Hall, a residence for the School Sisters of Notre Dame, and Kostka Hall, a building housing an auditorium. The buildings were completed in 1954, and 198 freshmen were welcomed in the fall at the academic investiture held in Kostka Hall.

=== Bergstrom Hall ===
Bergstrom Hall, which houses the college's dining rooms, bookstore, and post office, opened in 1964.

=== Haggerty Library ===
The Patrick and Beatrice Haggerty Library opened in 1981. It was renovated in 2011 and now houses a computer lab, group study rooms, and quiet study spaces.

=== Gerhardinger Center ===
Ground was broken for the Gerhardinger Center in 2002. The building was opened in 2004 and is named to honor Blessed Theresa Gerhardinger of Jesus, foundress of the School Sisters of Notre Dame order. The 33,000-square-foot (3,100 m^{2}) building houses the college's electronic lecture hall, Cyber Cafe, and science and occupational therapy classrooms and labs.

=== Bloechl Recreation Center ===
The Bloechl Recreation Center opened in 2006. The 24,800-square-foot (2,300 m^{2}) building houses basketball and volleyball courts, a fitness center, training rooms, locker rooms, offices, a concession area, and a classroom for aerobics, dance, and yoga.

== Student life ==
Mount Mary University students can participate in several student clubs and organizations, campus ministry activities, honor societies, and athletics teams. In congruence with the university's mission, Mount Mary also encourages students to participate in social justice and service learning activities on and off campus, as well as study abroad experiences.

The student-run newspaper, Arches, won awards for general web excellence, sports reporting, graphics, and general reporting at the Wisconsin Newspaper Association's Collegiate Better Newspaper Contest in 2012.

== Events and collections ==
The university is host to sports teams, musical performances, lectures, and other events throughout the year, including exhibits of regional artists' works in the Marian Art Gallery.

=== CREO ===
CREO is Mount Mary University's annual event that showcases arts and design student work and celebrates creativity. The event includes a student art gallery and student-designer fashion show. The annual fashion show began in 1967. The show moved off campus for the first time in 2011 and draws an audience of nearly 1,200 each year.

=== Historic Costume Collection ===
The Fashion Department began the Historic Costume Collection in 1965. The collection consists of 9,000 pieces dating 1750 to the present, and features significant 20th-century women's couture and ready-to-wear garments. The Historic Costume Collection includes pieces from actress Lynn Fontanne, Eunice Johnson, and Chanel.

=== Marian Art Gallery ===
Mount Mary University's Marian Art Gallery hosts national, regional, and local art shows throughout the year. School of Arts and Design students, faculty, and alumnae also have the opportunity to display their work in the gallery. The gallery is open to the public and is located on the first floor of Caroline Hall.

=== Starving Artists' Show ===
Since 1968, Mount Mary has been hosting the annual Starving Artists' Show. The show features local and national artists, selling artwork for $100 or less.

== Athletics ==
The Mount Mary athletic teams are called the Blue Angels. The university is members of the National Association of Intercollegiate Athletics' Chicagoland Collegiate Athletic Conference, beginning in the 2025–26 school year.

The Blue Angels were previously a member of the NCAA Division III ranks, primarily competing in the Coast to Coast Athletic Conference (C2C) since the 2020–21 academic year. The Blue Angels previously competed in the short-lived now defunct American Collegiate Athletic Association (ACAA) from 2018–19 to 2019–20; as well as an NCAA D-III Independent until after the 2017–18 school year.

Mount Mary competes in six intercollegiate varsity sports: basketball, cross country, golf, soccer, softball and volleyball.

== Notable alumnae and faculty ==
- Ann Angel, author of Janis Joplin: Rise Up Singing and Mount Mary faculty member
- Eliza Audley, owner of Eliza Audley fashion design company, who created a line of women's tennis clothing worn by athletes at the 2012 London Olympics
- Elizabeth Barbone, blogger and cookbook author of Easy Gluten-Free Baking
- Isabel Bernal, printmaker and painter
- Whittaker Chambers, writer, ex-Soviet spy, witness in Hiss Case (honorary doctorate of laws, 1952)
- Jana Champion, deputy director of the Wisconsin Crime Laboratory Bureau
- Karen Davidson, great-granddaughter of Harley-Davidson co-founder William A. Davidson and the creative director of general merchandise for Harley-Davidson Motor Company.
- Cynthia (Dohmen) LaConte, CEO of Dohmen Company and president of Dohmen Company Foundation
- Marie O'Brien, president and CEO of Enterforce, a company ranked #4 in the Top 50 Fastest Growing Women-Led Companies in North America by Entrepreneur magazine
- Donna Ricco, fashion designer whose designs are distributed in department stores such as Nordstrom and Macy's, and who is noted for designing a dress worn by First Lady Michelle Obama on The View TV program during the U.S. presidential race.
