= List of college athletic programs in Pennsylvania =

This is a list of college athletic programs in the U.S. state of Pennsylvania.

Notes:

- This list is in a tabular format, with columns arranged in the following order, from left to right:
  - Athletic team description (short school name and nickname), with a link to the school's athletic program article if it exists. When only one nickname is listed, it is used for teams of both sexes. (Note that in recent years, many schools have chosen to use the same nickname for men's and women's teams even when the nickname is distinctly masculine.) When two nicknames are given, the first is used for men's teams and the other is used for women's teams. Different nicknames for a specific sport within a school are noted separately below the table.
  - Full name of school.
  - Location of school.
  - Conference of the school (if conference column is left blank, the school is either independent or the conference is unknown).
- Apart from the ongoing conversions, the following notes apply:
  - Following the normal standard of U.S. sports media, the terms "University" and "College" are ignored in alphabetization, unless necessary to distinguish schools, such as Boston College and Boston University, or are actually used by the media in normally describing the school (formerly the case for the College of Charleston, but media now use "Charleston" for that school's athletic program).
  - Schools are also alphabetized by the names they are most commonly referred to by sports media, with non-intuitive examples included in parentheses next to the school name. This means, for example, that campuses bearing the name "University of North Carolina" may variously be found at "C" (Charlotte), "N" (North Carolina, referring to the Chapel Hill campus), and "U" (the Asheville, Greensboro, Pembroke, and Wilmington campuses, all normally referred to as UNC-{campus name}).
  - The prefix "St.", as in "Saint", is alphabetized as if it were spelled out.

== NCAA ==
=== Division I ===
Full NCAA Division I member colleges in Pennsylvania.
- FBS Football, - FCS Football, - Non-football

| Team | School | City | Conference | Sport sponsorship | | | | | | | | |
| Team | School | City | Conference | Football | Basketball | | Baseball | Softball | Ice hockey | | Soccer | |
| Team | School | City | Conference | Football | M | W | Baseball | Softball | M | W | M | W |
|---|---|---|---|---|---|---|---|---|---|---|---|---|
| Bucknell Bison | Bucknell University | Lewisburg | Patriot | FCS | Yes | Yes | Yes | Yes | No | No | Yes | Yes |
| Drexel Dragons | Drexel University | Philadelphia | Coastal | No | Yes | Yes | No | Yes | No | No | Yes | Yes |
| Duquesne Dukes | Duquesne University | Pittsburgh | Atlantic 10 | FCS (Note: Duquesne's football team competes in the Northeast Conference.) | Yes | Yes | No | No | No | No | Yes | Yes |
| La Salle Explorers | La Salle University | Philadelphia | Atlantic 10 | No | Yes | Yes | No | No | No | No | Yes | Yes |
| Lafayette Leopards | Lafayette College | Easton | Patriot | FCS | Yes | Yes | Yes | Yes | No | No | Yes | Yes |
| Lehigh Mountain Hawks | Lehigh University | Bethlehem | Patriot | FCS | Yes | Yes | Yes | Yes | No | No | Yes | Yes |
| Mercyhurst Lakers | Mercyhurst University | Erie | Northeast | FCS | Yes | Yes | Yes | Yes | Yes (Note: Mercyhurst's men's and women's ice hockey teams compete in Atlantic Hockey America.) | Yes | Yes | Yes |
| Penn Quakers | University of Pennsylvania | Philadelphia | Ivy League | FCS (Note: Penn additionally fields a team in sprint football, a weight-restricted form of football not governed by the NCAA, as a member of the Collegiate Sprint Football League.) | Yes | Yes | Yes | Yes | No | No | Yes | Yes |
| Penn State Nittany Lions and Lady Lions (Note: The women's basketball team uses "Lady Lions"; all other women's teams use "Nittany Lions".) | Pennsylvania State University | State College | Big Ten | FBS | Yes | Yes | Yes | Yes | Yes | Yes (Note: Penn State's women's ice hockey team competes in Atlantic Hockey America.) | Yes | Yes |
| Pittsburgh Panthers | University of Pittsburgh | Pittsburgh | ACC | FBS | Yes | Yes | Yes | Yes | No | No | Yes | Yes |
| Robert Morris Colonials | Robert Morris University | Moon Township | Horizon | FCS (Note: Robert Morris's football team competes in the Northeast Conference.) | Yes | Yes | No | Yes | Yes | Yes | Yes | Yes |
| Saint Joseph's Hawks | Saint Joseph's University | Philadelphia | Atlantic 10 | No | Yes | Yes | Yes | Yes | No | No | Yes | Yes |
| Temple Owls | Temple University | Philadelphia | The American | FBS | Yes | Yes | No | No | No | No | Yes | Yes |
| Villanova Wildcats | Villanova University | Villanova | Big East | FCS (Note: Villanova's football team competes in CAA Football, the technically separate football league operated by the all-sports Coastal Athletic Association.) | Yes | Yes | Yes | Yes | No | No | Yes | Yes |

=== Division II ===
Full NCAA Division II member colleges in Pennsylvania.
- Football, - Non-football

| Team | School | City | Conference | Sport sponsorship | | | | | | | | |
| Team | School | City | Conference | Football | Basketball | | Baseball | Softball | Ice hockey | | Soccer | |
| Team | School | City | Conference | Football | M | W | Baseball | Softball | M | W | M | W |
|---|---|---|---|---|---|---|---|---|---|---|---|---|
| Bloomsburg Huskies | Commonwealth University-Bloomsburg | Bloomsburg | Pennsylvania | Yes | Yes | Yes | Yes | Yes | No | No | Yes | Yes |
| California Vulcans | PennWest California | California | Pennsylvania | Yes | Yes | Yes | Yes | Yes | No | No | Yes | Yes |
| Chestnut Hill Griffins | Chestnut Hill College | Philadelphia | Central Atlantic | (Note: Chestnut Hill and Mansfield field teams in sprint football, a weight-restricted form of football not governed by the NCAA, as a member of the Collegiate Sprint Football League.) | Yes | Yes | Yes | Yes | No | No | Yes | Yes |
| Clarion Golden Eagles | PennWest Clarion | Clarion | Pennsylvania | Yes | Yes | Yes | Yes | Yes | No | No | No | Yes |
| East Stroudsburg Warriors | East Stroudsburg University | East Stroudsburg | Pennsylvania | Yes | Yes | Yes | Yes | Yes | No | No | Yes | Yes |
| Edinboro Fighting Scots | PennWest Edinboro | Edinboro | Pennsylvania | Yes | Yes | Yes | No | Yes | No | No | No | Yes |
| Gannon Golden Knights | Gannon University | Erie | Pennsylvania | Yes | Yes | Yes | Yes | Yes | No | No | Yes | Yes |
| Holy Family Tigers | Holy Family University | Philadelphia | Central Atlantic | No | Yes | Yes | Yes | Yes | No | No | Yes | Yes |
| IUP Crimson Hawks | Indiana University of Pennsylvania | Indiana | Pennsylvania | Yes | Yes | Yes | Yes | Yes | No | No | No | Yes |
| Jefferson Rams | Thomas Jefferson University | Philadelphia | Central Atlantic | No | Yes | Yes | Yes | Yes | No | No | Yes | Yes |
| Kutztown Golden Bears | Kutztown University | Kutztown | Pennsylvania | Yes | Yes | Yes | Yes | Yes | No | No | No | Yes |
| Lincoln Lions | Lincoln University | Lincoln University (Note: The U.S. Postal Service considers Lincoln University to be its own entity, separate from the nearest borough of Oxford.) | CIAA | Yes | Yes | Yes | Yes (Note: Lincoln's baseball and women's soccer teams compete in the East Coast Conference.) | Yes | No | No | No | Yes |
| Lock Haven Bald Eagles | Commonwealth University-Lock Haven | Lock Haven | Pennsylvania | Yes | Yes | Yes | Yes | Yes | No | No | Yes | Yes |
| Mansfield Mountaineers | Commonwealth University-Mansfield | Mansfield | Pennsylvania | Maybe | Yes | Yes | Yes | Yes | No | No | No | Yes |
| Millersville Marauders | Millersville University | Millersville | Pennsylvania | Yes | Yes | Yes | Yes | Yes | No | No | Yes | Yes |
| Point Park Pioneers | Point Park University | Pittsburgh | Mountain East | No | Yes | Yes | Yes | Yes | No | No | Yes | Yes |
| Pitt-Johnstown Mountain Cats | University of Pittsburgh at Johnstown | Johnstown | Pennsylvania | No | Yes | Yes | Yes | Yes | No | No | Yes | Yes |
| Seton Hill Griffins | Seton Hill University | Greensburg | Pennsylvania | Yes | Yes | Yes | Yes | Yes | No | No | Yes | Yes |
| Shippensburg Raiders | Shippensburg University | Shippensburg | Pennsylvania | Yes | Yes | Yes | Yes | Yes | No | No | Yes | Yes |
| Slippery Rock | Slippery Rock University | Slippery Rock | Pennsylvania | Yes | Yes | Yes | Yes | Yes | No | No | Yes | Yes |
| West Chester Golden Rams | West Chester University | West Chester | Pennsylvania | Yes | Yes | Yes | Yes | Yes | No | No | Yes | Yes |

=== Division III ===
Full NCAA Division III member colleges in Pennsylvania (Excluding the Greater Philadelphia Area).
- Football, - Non-football
Full NCAA Division III member colleges in Pennsylvania (Greater Philadelphia Area only).
- Football, - Non-football, - Non-football (Closing)

| Team | School | City | Conference | Sport sponsorship | | | | | | | | |
| Team | School | City | Conference | Football | Basketball | | Baseball | Softball | Ice hockey | | Soccer | |
| Team | School | City | Conference | Football | M | W | Baseball | Softball | M | W | M | W |
|---|---|---|---|---|---|---|---|---|---|---|---|---|
| Albright Lions | Albright College | Reading | MAC (Commonwealth) | Yes | Yes | Yes | Yes | Yes | No | No | Yes | Yes |
| Allegheny Gators | Allegheny College | Meadville | Presidents' | Yes | Yes | Yes | Yes | Yes | No | No | Yes | Yes |
| Alvernia Golden Wolves | Alvernia University | Reading | MAC (Commonwealth) | Yes | Yes | Yes | Yes | Yes | Yes | Yes (Note: The men's and women's ice hockey teams of Arcadia, Chatham, King's, Lebanon Valley, and Neumann, as well as the men's ice hockey team of Wilkes and the women's team of Alvernia, compete in the United Collegiate Hockey Conference.) | Yes | Yes |
| Arcadia Knights | Arcadia University | Glenside | MAC (Freedom) | No | Yes | Yes | Yes | Yes | Yes | Yes | Yes | Yes |
| Bryn Mawr Owls | Bryn Mawr College | Bryn Mawr | Centennial | No | No | Yes | No | No | No | No | No | Yes |
| Cairn Highlanders | Cairn University | Langhorne | United East | No | Yes | Yes | Yes | Yes | No | No | Yes | Yes |
| Carlow Celtics | Carlow University | Pittsburgh | Allegheny Mountain | No | Yes | Yes | No | Yes | Yes | No | No | Yes |
| Carnegie Mellon Tartans | Carnegie Mellon University | Pittsburgh | UAA | Yes (Note: Carnegie Mellon's football team competes in the Presidents' Athletic Conference.) | Yes | Yes | No | Yes | No | No | Yes | Yes |
| Cedar Crest Falcons | Cedar Crest College | Allentown | United East | No | No | Yes | No | Yes | No | No | No | Yes |
| Chatham Cougars | Chatham University | Pittsburgh | Presidents' | No | Yes | Yes | Yes | Yes | Yes | Yes | Yes | Yes |
| Delaware Valley Aggies | Delaware Valley College | Doylestown | MAC (Freedom) | Yes | Yes | Yes | Yes | Yes | No | No | Yes | Yes |
| DeSales Bulldogs | DeSales University | Center Valley | MAC (Freedom) | No | Yes | Yes | Yes | Yes | No | No | Yes | Yes |
| Dickinson Red Devils | Dickinson College | Carlisle | Centennial | Yes | Yes | Yes | Yes | Yes | No | No | Yes | Yes |
| Eastern Eagles | Eastern University | St. Davids | MAC (Commonwealth) | Yes (Note: Eastern additionally fields a women's flag football team; Eastern is an associate member of the Atlantic East for flag football.) | Yes | Yes | Yes | Yes | No | No | Yes | Yes |
| Elizabethtown Blue Jays | Elizabethtown College | Elizabethtown | Landmark | No | Yes | Yes | Yes | Yes | No | No | Yes | Yes |
| Franklin & Marshall Diplomats | Franklin & Marshall College | Lancaster | Centennial | Yes | Yes | Yes | Yes | Yes | No | No | Yes | Yes |
| Geneva Golden Tornadoes | Geneva College | Beaver Falls | Presidents' | Yes | Yes | Yes | Yes | Yes | No | No | Yes | Yes |
| Gettysburg Bullets | Gettysburg College | Gettysburg | Centennial | Yes | Yes | Yes | Yes | Yes | No | No | Yes | Yes |
| Grove City Wolverines | Grove City College | Grove City | Presidents' | Yes | Yes | Yes | Yes | Yes | No | No | Yes | Yes |
| Gwynedd Mercy Griffins | Gwynedd Mercy College | Lower Gwynedd Township | Atlantic East | No | Yes | Yes | Yes | Yes | No | No | Yes | Yes |
| Haverford Fords | Haverford College | Haverford | Centennial | No | Yes | Yes | Yes | Yes | No | No | Yes | Yes |
| Immaculata Mighty Macs | Immaculata University | Malvern | Atlantic East | (Note: Immaculata and Neumann field women's flag football teams.) | Yes | Yes | Yes | Yes | No | No | Yes | Yes |
| Juniata Eagles | Juniata College | Huntingdon | Landmark | Yes | Yes | Yes | Yes | Yes | No | No | Yes | Yes |
| Keystone Giants | Keystone College | La Plume Township | United East | Yes (Note: Keystone's football team competes in the Landmark Conference.) | Yes | Yes | Yes | Yes | No | No | Yes | Yes |
| King's Monarchs | King's College | Wilkes-Barre | MAC (Freedom) | Yes | Yes | Yes | Yes | Yes | Yes | Yes | Yes | Yes |
| La Roche Red Hawks | La Roche University | McCandless | Allegheny Mountain | No | Yes | Yes | Yes | Yes | No | No | Yes | Yes |
| Lancaster Bible Chargers | Lancaster Bible College | Lancaster | United East | No | Yes | Yes | Yes | Yes | No | No | Yes | Yes |
| Lebanon Valley Flying Dutchmen | Lebanon Valley College | Annville | MAC (Freedom) | Yes | Yes | Yes | Yes | Yes | Yes | Yes | Yes | Yes |
| Lycoming Warriors | Lycoming College | Williamsport | Landmark | Yes | Yes | Yes | Yes | Yes | No | No | Yes | Yes |
| Marywood Pacers | Marywood University | Scranton | Atlantic East | No | Yes | Yes | Yes | Yes | No | No | Yes | Yes |
| Messiah Falcons | Messiah University | Grantham | MAC (Commonwealth) | No | Yes | Yes | Yes | Yes | No | No | Yes | Yes |
| Misericordia Cougars | Misericordia University | Dallas | MAC (Freedom) | Yes | Yes | Yes | Yes | Yes | No | No | Yes | Yes |
| Moravian Greyhounds | Moravian University | Bethlehem | Landmark | Yes | Yes | Yes | Yes | Yes | No | No | Yes | Yes |
| Mount Aloysius Mounties | Mount Aloysius College | Cresson | Allegheny Mountain | No | Yes | Yes | Yes | Yes | No | No | Yes | Yes |
| Muhlenberg Mules | Muhlenberg College | Allentown | Centennial | Yes | Yes | Yes | Yes | Yes | No | No | Yes | Yes |
| Neumann Knights | Neumann University | Aston | Atlantic East | Maybe | Yes | Yes | Yes | Yes | Yes | Yes | Yes | Yes |
| Penn College Wildcats | Pennsylvania College of Technology | Williamsport | United East | No | Yes | Yes | Yes | Yes | No | No | Yes | Yes |
| Penn State Abington Nittany Lions | Penn State Abington | Abington | United East | No | Yes | Yes | Yes | Yes | No | No | Yes | Yes |
| Penn State Altoona Nittany Lions | Penn State Altoona | Altoona | Allegheny Mountain | No | Yes | Yes | Yes | Yes | No | No | Yes | Yes |
| Penn State Behrend Lions | Penn State Erie, The Behrend College | Erie | Allegheny Mountain | No | Yes | Yes | Yes | Yes | No | No | Yes | Yes |
| Penn State Berks Nittany Lions | Penn State Berks | Reading | United East | No | Yes | Yes | Yes | Yes | No | No | Yes | Yes |
| Penn State Brandywine Lions | Penn State Brandywine | Media | United East | No | Yes | Yes | Yes | Yes | No | No | Yes | Yes |
| Penn State Harrisburg Lions | Penn State Harrisburg | Middletown | United East | No | Yes | Yes | Yes | Yes | No | No | Yes | Yes |
| Pitt-Bradford Panthers | University of Pittsburgh at Bradford | Bradford | Allegheny Mountain | No | Yes | Yes | Yes | Yes | No | No | Yes | Yes |
| Pitt-Greensburg Bobcats | University of Pittsburgh at Greensburg | Greensburg | Allegheny Mountain | No | Yes | Yes | Yes | Yes | No | No | Yes | Yes |
| Rosemont Ravens | Rosemont College | Rosemont | United East | No | Yes | Yes | Yes | Yes | No | No | Yes | Yes |
| Scranton Royals | University of Scranton | Scranton | Landmark | No | Yes | Yes | Yes | Yes | No | No | Yes | Yes |
| Saint Francis Red Wolves | Saint Francis University | Loretto | Presidents' | Yes | Yes | Yes | No | Yes | No | No | Yes | Yes |
| Saint Vincent Bearcats | Saint Vincent College | Latrobe | Presidents' | Yes | Yes | Yes | Yes | Yes | No | No | Yes | Yes |
| Susquehanna River Hawks | Susquehanna University | Selinsgrove | Landmark | Yes | Yes | Yes | Yes | Yes | No | No | Yes | Yes |
| Swarthmore Garnet | Swarthmore College | Swarthmore | Centennial | No | Yes | Yes | Yes | Yes | No | No | Yes | Yes |
| Thiel Tomcats | Thiel College | Greenville | Presidents' | Yes | Yes | Yes | Yes | Yes | No | No | Yes | Yes |
| Ursinus Bears | Ursinus College | Collegeville | Centennial | Yes | Yes | Yes | Yes | Yes | No | No | Yes | Yes |
| Washington and Jefferson Presidents | Washington and Jefferson College | Washington | Presidents' | Yes | Yes | Yes | Yes | Yes | No | No | Yes | Yes |
| Waynesburg Yellow Jackets | Waynesburg University | Waynesburg | Presidents' | Yes | Yes | Yes | Yes | Yes | No | No | Yes | Yes |
| Westminster Titans | Westminster College | New Wilmington | Presidents' | Yes | Yes | Yes | Yes | Yes | No | No | Yes | Yes |
| Widener Pride | Widener University | Chester | MAC (Commonwealth) | Yes | Yes | Yes | Yes | Yes | No | No | Yes | Yes |
| Wilkes Colonels | Wilkes University | Wilkes-Barre | Landmark | Yes | Yes | Yes | Yes | Yes | Yes | Yes (Note: Wilkes's women's ice hockey team competes as an independent.) | Yes | Yes |
| Wilson Phoenix | Wilson College | Chambersburg | United East | No | Yes | Yes | Yes | Yes | No | No | Yes | Yes |
| York Spartans | York College of Pennsylvania | York | MAC (Commonwealth) | No | Yes | Yes | Yes | Yes | No | No | Yes | Yes |

== NJCAA ==
| Team | School | City | Region |
|---|---|---|---|
| Beaver County Titans | Community College of Beaver County | Monaca | 20 |
| Bucks County Centurions | Bucks County Community College | Newtown | 19 |
| Butler County Pioneers | Butler County Community College | Butler | 20 |
| CCAC Wild Cats | Community College of Allegheny County | Pittsburgh | 20 |
| CC of Philadelphia Lions | Community College of Philadelphia | Philadelphia | 19 |
| Delaware County Phantoms | Delaware County Community College | Media | 19 |
| Harcum Bears | Harcum College | Bryn Mawr | 19 |
| HACC Hawks | Harrisburg Area Community College | Harrisburg | 19 |
| Lackawanna Falcons | Lackawanna College | Scranton | 19 |
| Lehigh Carbon Cougars | Lehigh Carbon Community College | Schnecksville | 19 |
| Luzerne County Trailblazers | Luzerne County Community College | Nanticoke | 19 |
| Montgomery County Mustangs | Montgomery County Community College | Blue Bell | 19 |
| Manor Blue Jays | Manor College | Jenkintown | 19 |
| Northampton Spartans | Northampton Community College | Bethlehem | 19 |
| Penn Highlands Black Bears | Pennsylvania Highlands Community College | Johnstown | 20 |
| Thaddeus Stevens Tech Bulldogs | Thaddeus Stevens College of Technology | Lancaster | 19 |
| Westmoreland County Wolfpack | Westmoreland County Community College | Youngwood | 20 |
| Williamson Free Mechanics | Williamson College of the Trades | Media | 19 |

== USCAA ==
| Team | School | City | Conference |
|---|---|---|---|
| Bucks County Centurions | Bucks County Community College | Newtown | Eastern States |
| Carlow Celtics | Carlow University | Pittsburgh | Independent |
| Central Penn Knights | Central Penn College | Summerdale | Eastern States |
| Manor Blue Jays | Manor College | Abington Township | Eastern States |
| Penn State-Beaver Nittany Lions | Penn State University-Beaver | Monaca | Penn State University |
| Penn State-Brandywine Lions | Penn State University-Brandywine | Media | Penn State University |
| Penn State-DuBois Nittany Lions | Penn State University-DuBois | DuBois | Penn State University |
| Penn State-Fayette Roaring Lions | Penn State University-Fayette | Uniontown | Penn State University |
| Penn State-Greater Allegheny Lions | Penn State University-Greater Allegheny | McKeesport | Penn State University |
| Penn State-Hazleton Nittany Lions | Penn State University-Hazleton | Hazleton | Penn State University |
| Penn State-Lehigh Valley Nittany Lions | Penn State University-Lehigh Valley | Center Valley | Penn State University |
| Penn State-Mont Alto Nittany Lions | Penn State University-Mont Alto | Mont Alto | Penn State University |
| Penn State-New Kensington Nittany Lions | Penn State University-New Kensington | New Kensington | Penn State University |
| Penn State-Schuylkill Nittany Lions | Penn State University-Schuylkill | Schuylkill Haven | Penn State University |
| Penn State-Scranton Nittany Lions | Penn State University-Scranton | Dunmore | Penn State University |
| Penn State-Shenango Nittany Lions | Penn State University-Shenango | Sharon | Penn State University |
| Penn State-Wilkes-Barre Nittany Lions | Penn State University-Wilkes-Barre | Lehman Township | Penn State University |
| Penn State-York Nittany Lions | Penn State University-York | York | Penn State University |
| Williamson Free Mechanics | Williamson College of the Trades | Media | Eastern States |

== See also ==
- List of NCAA Division I institutions
- List of NCAA Division II institutions
- List of NCAA Division III institutions
- List of NAIA institutions
- List of USCAA institutions
- List of NCCAA institutions
- List of NJCAA Division I institutions
- List of NJCAA Division II institutions
- List of NJCAA Division III institutions
