= Colonial States Athletic Conference =

Defunct NCAA Division III athletic conference

- Formerly: Pennsylvania Athletic Conference
- Association: NCAA
- Founded: 1992
- Folded: 2023
- Commissioner: Marie Stroman (final)
- Sports fielded: 16; men's: 7; women's: 9
- Division: Division III
- No. of teams: 10 (final)
- Headquarters: Villanova, Pennsylvania, U.S.
- Region: Mid-Atlantic

Locations
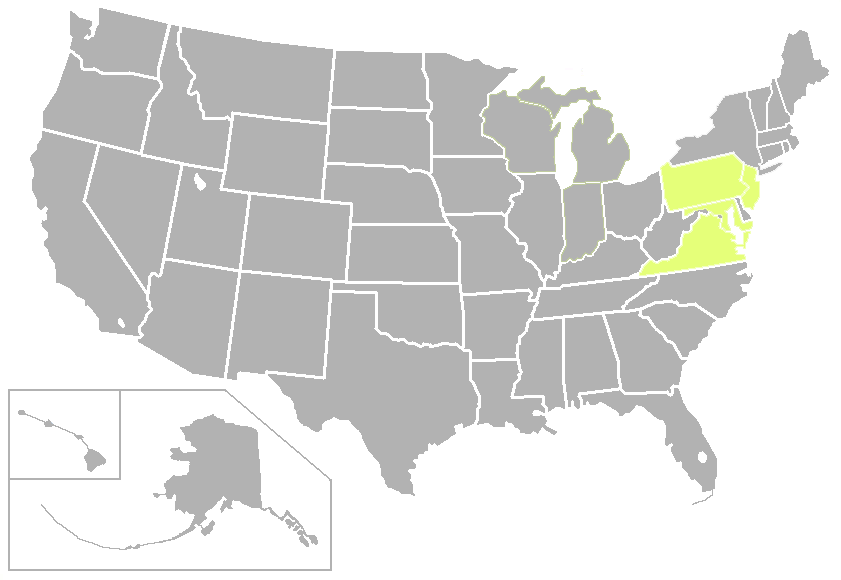

The Colonial States Athletic Conference (CSAC) was an NCAA Division III collegiate athletic conference in the Mid-Atlantic United States that existed from 1992 to 2023. There were nine full member institutions in the conference. The conference's membership, as with most Middle Atlantic conferences, was shaken as a result of the formation of the Landmark Conference and its ensuing domino effect. The conference, founded in 1992 as the Pennsylvania Athletic Conference, changed its name in 2008.

The CSAC experienced another shakeup in 2018 when five members departed the conference to join with two other institutions to form a new Division III conference that eventually became the Atlantic East Conference. In July 2018, the CSAC added two new members. The conference added its 10th member on July 1, 2019, and its 11th on the same day in 2020, but was reduced to 10 members when on June 18, 2021, Centenary University published its move to Atlantic East, starting July 1 that year, but its lacrosse teams would start competing in their new conference's 2022 season.

On December 19, 2022, the United East Conference and the Colonial States Athletic Conference announced their intent to merge beginning with the 2023–24 academic year. The conference officially ceased to exist when its ten remaining members were absorbed by the United East Conference on July 1, 2023.

== History ==
Colonial States Athletic Conference
Location of CSAC members: full

=== Chronological timeline ===
- 1991 – On November 4, 1991, the CSAC was founded as the Pennsylvania Athletic Conference (PAC). Charter members included Alvernia College, Beaver College (now Arcadia University), Cabrini College (now Cabrini University), Cedar Crest College, Eastern University, Gwynedd-Mercy College (now Gwynedd Mercy University), Immaculata University, Marywood University, College Misericordia (now Misericordia University), and Rosemont College, beginning the 1992–93 academic year.
- 1992 – Neumann College (now Neumann University) joined the PAC alongside the other 10 charter members in September 1992.
- 1993 – On April 28, 1993, the PAC was granted affiliate membership within the National Collegiate Athletic Association (NCAA) in the 1993–94 academic year.
- 1993 – Allentown College (now DeSales University) joined the PAC in the 1993–94 academic year.
- 1995 – The PAC had achieved full membership within the NCAA Division III ranks in the 1995–96 academic year.
- 1997 – DeSales left the PAC to join the Middle Atlantic Conferences after the 1996–97 academic year.
- 1997 – Wesley College joined the PAC in the 1997–98 academic year.
- 2001 – Shenandoah University and Villa Julie College (now Stevenson University) joined the PAC as associate members for men's lacrosse in the 2002 spring season (2001–02 academic year).
- 2006 – Stevenson left the PAC as an associate member for men's lacrosse after the 2006 spring season (2005–06 academic year).
- 2007 – Arcadia and Wesley (Del.) left the PAC to join the Middle Atlantic Conferences after the 2006–07 academic year.
- 2007 – Centenary College of New Jersey (now Centenary University) and the College of Notre Dame of Maryland (now Notre Dame of Maryland University) joined the PAC in the 2007–08 academic year.
- 2008 – Alvernia, Eastern (Pa.), and Misericordia left the PAC to join the Middle Atlantic Conferences after the 2007–08 academic year.
- 2008 – The PAC was re-branded as the Colonial States Athletic Conference (CSAC), beginning the 2008–09 academic year.
- 2008 – Baptist Bible College (now Clarks Summit University), Keystone College and Philadelphia Biblical University (now Cairn University) joined the CSAC in the 2008–09 academic year.
- 2012 – Shenandoah left the CSAC as an associate member for men's lacrosse after the 2012 spring season (2011–12 academic year).
- 2015 – Franciscan University of Steubenville and Pennsylvania State University at Erie, The Behrend College joined the CSAC as associate members for men's and women's indoor and outdoor track & field in the 2016 spring season (2015–16 academic year).
- 2018 – Cabrini, Gwynedd Mercy, Immaculata, Marywood, and Neumann left the CSAC to join the newly-formed Atlantic East Conference (AEC) after the 2017–18 academic year.
- 2018 – Bryn Athyn College and Wilson College joined the CSAC in the 2018–19 academic year.
- 2018 – Alfred State College joined the CSAC as an associate member for men's and women's indoor and outdoor track & field in the 2019 spring season (2018–19 academic year).
- 2018 – Kean University, Montclair State University, and Stockton University joined the CSAC as associate members for men's lacrosse in the 2019 spring season (2018–19 academic year).
- 2018 – The University of Valley Forge joined the CSAC as an associate member for baseball in the 2019 spring season (2018–19 academic year).
- 2019
  - Franciscan left the CSAC as an associate member for men's and women's indoor and outdoor track & field after the 2019 spring season (2018–19 academic year).
  - The College of Saint Elizabeth (now Saint Elizabeth University) joined the CSAC in the 2019–20 academic year.
  - Lancaster Bible College joined the CSAC as an associate member for field hockey in the 2019 fall season (2019–20 academic year).
- 2020
  - Valley Forge would later upgrade to join the CSAC for all sports in the 2020–21 academic year.
  - Gallaudet University joined the CSAC as an associate member for men's and women's indoor and outdoor track & field in the 2021 spring season (2020–21 academic year).
- 2021
  - Centenary (N.J.) left the CSAC to join Atlantic East Conference after the 2020–21 academic year; although its field hockey and women's lacrosse teams would remain in the CSAC as associate members until the 2022 spring season (2021–22 academic year).
  - Pratt Institute joined the CSAC as an associate member for men's volleyball in the 2022 spring season (2021–22 academic year).
- 2022
  - The CSAC and the United East Conference announced their intent to merge, beginning in the fall 2023 season.
  - Lancaster Bible added men's volleyball to its CSAC membership in the 2023 spring season (2022–23 academic year).
- 2023
  - Notre Dame of Maryland would add men's sports for the 2023–24 academic year.
  - The CSAC and United East officially announced that the merged conference would retain the United East name, officially ending the CSAC on July 1, 2023.

== Member schools ==
=== Final members ===
The CSAC had ten final full members, all were private schools:

Institution	Location	Founded	Affiliation	Enrollment	Nickname	Joined	Left	Current conference
Bryn Athyn College	Bryn Athyn, Pennsylvania	1877	New Church	303	Lions	2018	2023	United East (UEC)
Cairn University	Langhorne, Pennsylvania	1913	Nondenominational	2,200	Highlanders	2008	2023	United East (UEC)
Cedar Crest College (Note: This institution is a women's college, therefore it does not compete in men's sports.)	Allentown, Pennsylvania	1867	United Church of Christ	1,820	Falcons	1992	2023	United East (UEC)
Clarks Summit University	Clarks Summit, Pennsylvania	1932	Baptist	1,142	Defenders	2008	2023	United East (UEC)
Keystone College	La Plume, Pennsylvania	1868	Nonsectarian	1,600	Giants	2008	2023	United East (UEC)
Notre Dame of Maryland University (Note: This institution is a former women's college, which eventually turned into a co-educational college (Rosemont since 2009–10, Wilson since 2013–14, Saint Elizabeth since 2016–17, and Notre Dame of Maryland starting in 2023–24).)	Baltimore, Maryland	1873	Catholic (SSND)	3,824	Gators	2007	2023	United East (UEC)
Rosemont College	Rosemont, Pennsylvania	1922	Catholic (SHCJ)	903	Ravens	1992	2023	United East (UEC)
Saint Elizabeth University (Note: Formerly known as the College of Saint Elizabeth until 2020.)	Morristown, New Jersey	1899	Catholic (Sisters of Charity)	1,200	Eagles	2019	2023	United East (UEC)
University of Valley Forge	Phoenixville, Pennsylvania	1939	Assemblies of God	742	Patriots	2020	2023	United East (UEC)
Wilson College	Chambersburg, Pennsylvania	1869	Presbyterian	1,098	Phoenix	2018	2023	United East (UEC)

=== Final affiliate members ===
The CSAC had nine affiliate members when it dissolved:

Institution	Location	Founded	Affiliation	Enrollment	Nickname	Joined	Primary conference	CSAC sport(s)
Alfred State College	Alfred, New York	1908	Public	3,737	Pioneers	2018–19	Allegheny Mountain (AMCC)	men's outdoor track and field women's outdoor track and field
Eastern Nazarene College	Quincy, Massachusetts	1900	Nazarene	772	Lions	2022–23	North Atlantic (NAC)	men's lacrosse
Gallaudet University	Washington, D.C.	1864	Quasigovernmental	1,138	Bison	2020–21	United East (UEC)	men's outdoor track and field women's outdoor track and field
Lancaster Bible College	Lancaster, Pennsylvania	1933	Nondenominational	1,499	Chargers	2019–20	United East (UEC)	field hockey
Lancaster Bible College	Lancaster, Pennsylvania	1933	Nondenominational	1,499	Chargers	2022–23	United East (UEC)	men's volleyball
Mitchell College	New London, Connecticut	1938	Nonsectarian	572	Mariners	2022–23	Great Northeast (GNAC)	men's lacrosse
New England College	Henniker, New Hampshire	1946	Nonsectarian	4,327	Pilgrims	2022–23	Great Northeast (GNAC)	men's lacrosse
Penn State–Behrend	Erie, Pennsylvania	1948	State-related	4,700	Lions	2015–16	Allegheny Mountain (AMCC)	men's outdoor track and field women's outdoor track and field
Pratt Institute	Brooklyn, New York	1887	Private	5,137	Cannoneers	2021–22	Coast to Coast (C2C)	men's volleyball
Sweet Briar College	Sweet Briar, Virginia	1901	Private	353	Vixens	2021–22	Old Dominion (ODAC)	field hockey women's lacrosse

=== Former members ===
The CSAC had 12 former full members, all were private schools:

Institution	Location	Founded	Affiliation	Enrollment	Nickname	Joined	Left	Current conference
Alvernia University	Reading, Pennsylvania	1958	Catholic (Franciscan)	2,900	Crusaders	1992–93	2007–08	MAC Commonwealth
Arcadia University	Glenside, Pennsylvania	1853	Presbyterian	4,021	Knights	1992–93	2006–07	MAC Freedom
Cabrini University	Radnor, Pennsylvania	1957	Catholic (Missionary Sisters)	1,759	Cavaliers	1992–93	2017–18	N/A (Note: Cabrini was acquired by Villanova University in 2024.)
Centenary University (Note: Centenary (N.J.) remained in the CSAC as an associate member for field hockey and women's lacrosse.)	Hackettstown, New Jersey	1867	United Methodist	1,597	Cyclones	2007–08	2020–21	Atlantic East (AEC)
DeSales University	Center Valley, Pennsylvania	1965	Catholic (O.S.F.S.)	2,499	Bulldogs	1993–94	1996–97	MAC Freedom
Eastern University	St. Davids, Pennsylvania	1925	Baptist	5,235	Eagles	1992–93	2007–08	MAC Commonwealth
Gwynedd Mercy University	Gwynedd Valley, Pennsylvania	1948	Catholic (Sisters of Mercy)	2,017	Griffins	1992–93	2017–18	Atlantic East (AEC)
Immaculata University (Note: This institution is a former women's college, which eventually turned into a co-educational college (Immaculata since 2005–06).)	Immaculata, Pennsylvania	1940	Catholic (Sisters, Servants of the I.H.M.)	1,043	Mighty Macs	1992–93	2017–18	Atlantic East (AEC)
Marywood University	Scranton, Pennsylvania	1915	Catholic (RSHM)	2,470	Pacers	1992–93	2017–18	MAC Freedom
Misericordia University	Dallas, Pennsylvania	1924	Catholic (Sisters of Mercy)	2,355	Cougars	1992–93	2007–08	MAC Freedom
Neumann University	Aston, Pennsylvania	1965	Catholic (Franciscan)	3,000	Knights	1992–93	2017–18	MAC Commonwealth
Wesley College	Dover, Delaware	1873	United Methodist	2,320	Wolverines	1997–98	2006–07	N/A (Note: Wesley was acquired by Delaware State University in 2021.)

=== Former affiliate members ===
The CSAC had seven former affiliate members, four were private and three were public schools:

Institution	Location	Founded	Affiliation	Enrollment	Nickname	Joined	Left	CSAC sport(s)	Current primary conference	Current conference in former CSAC sport(s)
Centenary University (Note: Centenary (N.J.) was previously a full CSAC member from 2007–08 to 2020–21.)	Hackettstown, New Jersey	1867	United Methodist	1,708	Cyclones	2021–22	2021–22	field hockey women's lacrosse	Atlantic East	
Centenary University	Hackettstown, New Jersey	1867	United Methodist	1,708	Cyclones	2021–22	2021–22	women's lacrosse	Atlantic East	None (Note: Centenary (N.J.) dropped field hockey after the 2021–22 season.)
Franciscan University of Steubenville	Steubenville, Ohio	1946	Catholic (Franciscan Friars)	2,100	Barons	2015–16	2018–19	men's outdoor track and field women's outdoor track and field	Presidents' (PAC)	
Kean University	Union, New Jersey	1855	Public	13,000	Cougars	2018–19	2021–22	men's lacrosse	New Jersey (NJAC)	Coastal Lacrosse (CLC)
Montclair State University	Montclair, New Jersey	1908	Public	16,852	Red Hawks	2018–19	2021–22	men's lacrosse	New Jersey (NJAC)	Coastal Lacrosse (CLC)
Shenandoah University	Winchester, Virginia	1875	United Methodist	1,767	Hornets	2001–02	2011–12	men's lacrosse	Old Dominion (ODAC)	
Villa Julie College (Note: Currently known as Stevenson University since 2008.)	Owings Mills, Maryland	1947	Nonsectarian	2,708	Mustangs	2001–02	2005–06	men's lacrosse	MAC Commonwealth	
Stockton University	Galloway, New Jersey	1969	Public	8,242	Ospreys	2018–19	2021–22	men's lacrosse	New Jersey (NJAC)	Coastal Lacrosse (CLC)

== Staff ==
- Marie Stroman - Commissioner
- Antonio "Tone" Cockrell - Assistant Commissioner of Strategic Initiatives
