= United East Conference =

American college athletic conference

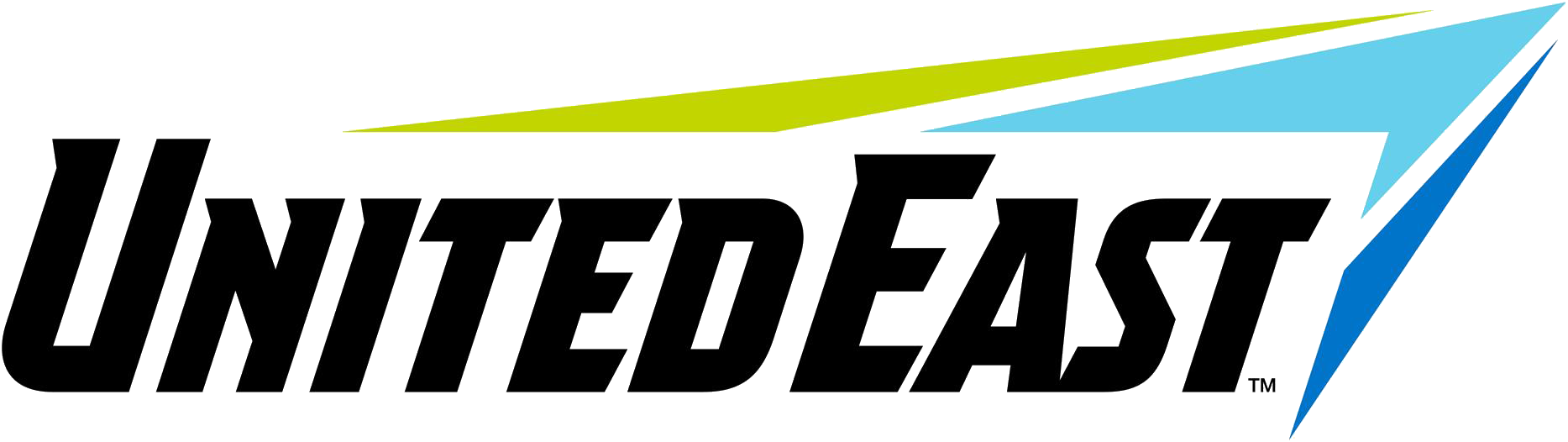
- Formerly: North Eastern Athletic Conference (NEAC) (2004–2023)
- Association: NCAA
- Founded: 2004; 22 years ago
- Commissioner: Stephanie Dutton
- Sports fielded: 20; men's: 10; women's: 10
- Division: Division III
- No. of teams: 13 (17 in 2027)
- Headquarters: Latham, New York, U.S.
- Region: Mid-Atlantic
- Website: https://gounitedeast.com

Locations
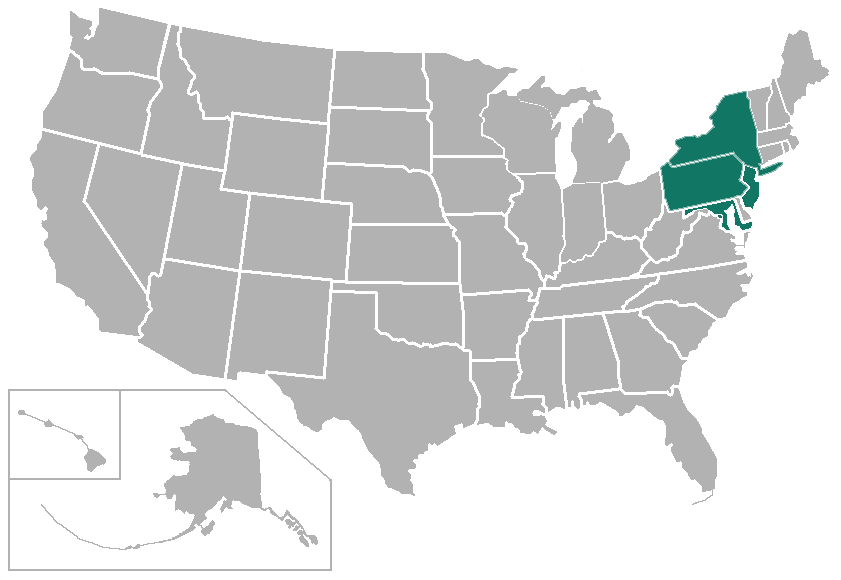

The United East Conference, formerly known as the North Eastern Athletic Conference (NEAC), is an intercollegiate athletic conference affiliated with the NCAA's Division III.

Member institutions are located in the Mid-Atlantic region of the United States.

== History ==
The North Eastern Athletic Conference (NEAC) was founded in 2004. The original membership consisted of the following schools: Baptist Bible College (later known as Clarks Summit University), Bard College, Cazenovia College, Chestnut Hill College, D'Youville College (now known as D'Youville University), Keuka College, Keystone College, Pennsylvania State University, Berks-Lehigh Valley College (now known as Pennsylvania State University Berks, a.k.a. Penn State–Berks), Philadelphia Biblical University (now known as Cairn University), Polytechnic University (later known as the Polytechnic Institute of New York University and now fully merged into NYU as its Tandon School of Engineering), the State University of New York at Purchase (SUNY Purchase), and Villa Julie College (now known as Stevenson University).

At the conclusion of the 2006–07 season, the NEAC had a shifting of membership losing five institutions and gaining three new members. The departing members were: Bard, Chestnut Hill, Polytechnic (N.Y.), SUNY Purchase and Stevenson; while the new members were: Pennsylvania State University at Harrisburg (a.k.a. Penn State–Harrisburg), Wells College and Wilson College of Pennsylvania. The NEAC consisted of 10 members in the 2007–08 season.

At the conclusion of the 2007–08 season, the NEAC lost an additional three institutions while gaining two new members. The departing members were: Baptist Bible, Keystone and Philadelphia Biblical (all to the Pennsylvania Athletic Conference, later renamed the Colonial States Athletic Conference). The new members were the State University of New York at Cobleskill (SUNY Cobleskill) and the State University of New York Institute of Technology (SUNYIT); the latter is now known as SUNY Polytechnic Institute (SUNY Poly). The NEAC consisted of nine members in the 2008–09 season.

The NEAC accepted four associate member institutions for the 2008–09 season; they were: Medaille College (later known as Medaille University; for men's and women's lacrosse), Rutgers University–Camden (for men's golf), the State University of New York at Oneonta (a.k.a. SUNY Oneonta, for men's tennis), and the University of Dallas (for men's soccer, men's golf, men's & women's cross country, and men's & women's basketball). The University of Dallas also added women's volleyball to compete for the NEAC in the 2009–10 season.

At the conclusion of the 2008–09 season, the NEAC lost an additional founding member in D'Youville. In the 2009–10 season, the NEAC welcomed three additional new members in the College of Saint Elizabeth (now known as Saint Elizabeth University), Pennsylvania State University at Abington (a.k.a. Penn State–Abington) and the State University of New York at Morrisville (SUNY Morrisville). The NEAC had accepted four associate member institutions in that same season. Additionally, the NEAC also began a three year partnership with the North Atlantic Conference (NAC) in four sports: baseball; women's lacrosse; and men's and women's tennis. Departing the NEAC at the conclusion of the 2009–10 season were associate members the University of Dallas and SUNY Oneonta.

In the 2010–11 season, the NEAC welcomed Gallaudet University as its twelfth member. In the 2011–12 season, the NEAC gained one new full member in Lancaster Bible College as its thirteenth full member; while Rutgers–Camden (already an associate member in men's golf) added men's tennis into its NEAC associate membership. The partnership between the NEAC and the NAC ended for baseball and women's lacrosse following the 2011–12 season. For the 2012–13 season, the NEAC added Hilbert College as an associate member for men's lacrosse.

At the conclusion of the 2012–13 season, the NEAC lost one full member in Penn State–Harrisburg, returning back to twelve schools. In the 2013–14 season, the NEAC added Cedar Crest College as an associate member for women's swimming. Beginning in the 2014–15 season, the NEAC accepted two new full members in Bryn Athyn College and Pennsylvania College of Technology, putting the conference to fourteen schools. Also in that same season, Wilson College, a former women's college that became co-educational in the 2013–14 school year, began a men's athletic program, and four other schools became men's volleyball associates, being Pennsylvania State University at Altoona (a.k.a. Penn State–Altoona) and former full member D'Youville; while Medaille and Hilbert added that sport into their NEAC associate memberships.

Changes in the NEAC membership have continued to the present. On August 30, 2017, Bryn Athyn and Wilson announced that they would leave the NEAC for the Colonial States Athletic Conference (CSAC), beginning the 2018–19 school year. The next change of membership came in 2019–20 with the return of Penn State–Harrisburg and the departure of Saint Elizabeth for the Colonial States Athletic Conference. In July 2020, the NEAC lost four members, with Keuka departing for the Empire 8 Athletic Conference and Cazenovia, SUNY Cobleskill, and SUNY Poly leaving for the North Atlantic Conference (NAC). The NEAC membership returned to nine in 2021, with the arrival of St. Mary's College of Maryland.

=== Recent events ===
On August 2, 2021, the conference revealed that it was rebranding itself as the United East Conference. The conference said that the name “United East” was chosen because it describes the conference’s commitment to collaborate on a shared mission in a diverse environment while also still giving a nod to the geographical placement of the member schools. The conference has never used the abbreviation of "UEC" in its branding.

On March 1, 2022, SUNY Morrisville announced that it would leave the United East to join the North Atlantic Conference (NAC) starting in the 2023–24 academic year.

On July 6, 2022, the United East announced that Clarks Summit joined the conference as an associate member in men's golf and men's tennis starting in the 2022–23 academic year.

On August 15, 2022, Wells announced that it would leave the United East to join the Allegheny Mountain Collegiate Conference starting in the 2023–24 academic year.

On December 19, 2022, the United East Conference and the Colonial States Athletic Conference (CSAC) announced their intent to merge beginning with the 2023–24 academic year. The merger was intended to address the evolving landscape of higher education by stabilizing conference membership and solidifying the sport sponsorship currently offered by the existing conferences. This merger also provided member institutions an opportunity to decrease the number of associate memberships necessary to support the current sport offerings on each respective campus. When the merger was finalized sports with a large number of members would compete in north and south divisions.

On June 23, 2023, the CSAC and United East officially announced that the merged conference would retain the United East name, officially ending the CSAC on July 1, 2023. Consequently, all ten members from the CSAC (Bryn Athyn College, Cairn University (formerly Philadelphia Biblical), Cedar Crest College, Clarks Summit University (formerly Baptist Bible), Keystone College, Notre Dame of Maryland University, Rosemont College, Saint Elizabeth University, the University of Valley Forge and Wilson College of Pennsylvania) joined the United East.

On January 4, 2024, the United East accepted Pennsylvania State University, Brandywine's application to become a full member of the conference beginning in 2024–25.

On July 12, 2024, the United East announced the addition of Neumann University as an associate member for men's volleyball, beginning the 2025 spring season of the 2024–25 academic year.

On July 1, 2024, Clarks Summit University announced that it had ceased operations.

On December 16, 2024, the United East announced the addition of Immaculata University as an associate member for men's volleyball, beginning the 2026 spring season of the 2025–26 academic year.

On July 29, 2026, the University of Valley Forge announced it will cease operations at the end of the summer semester.

=== Chronological timeline ===
United East Conference
Locations of United East members:
Current
Future
- 2004 – In 2004, the United East was founded as the North Eastern Athletic Conference (NEAC). Charter members included Baptist Bible College (later Clarks Summit University), Bard College, Philadelphia Biblical University (now Cairn University), Cazenovia College, Chestnut Hill College, D'Youville College, Keuka College, Keystone College, Pennsylvania State University, Berks, Polytechnic University (later the Polytechnic Institute of New York University and now the NYU Tandon School of Engineering), the State University of New York at Purchase (SUNY Purchase), and Villa Julie College (now Stevenson University), beginning the 2004–05 academic year.
- 2007:
  - Five institutions left the NEAC to join their respective new home primary conferences, all effective after the 2006–07 academic year:
    - Bard, Polytechnic (N.Y.) and SUNY Purchase to the Skyline Conference
    - Chestnut Hill to the Division II ranks of the National Collegiate Athletic Association (NCAA) and the Central Atlantic Collegiate Conference (CACC)
    - and Stevenson to the Capital Athletic Conference (CAC)
  - Pennsylvania State University at Harrisburg, Wells College and Wilson College of Pennsylvania joined the NEAC in the 2007–08 academic year.
- 2008:
  - Baptist Bible (later Clarks Summit) Keystone and Philadelphia Biblical (now Cairn) left the NEAC to join the Pennsylvania Athletic Conference (PAC; later renamed the Colonial States Athletic Conference [CSAC]) after the 2007–08 academic year.
  - The State University of New York at Cobleskill (SUNY Cobleskill) and the State University of New York Institute of Technology (SUNYIT, now the SUNY Polytechnic Institute, or SUNY Poly) joined the NEAC in the 2008–09 academic year.
  - Four institutions joined the NEAC as associate members, all effective in the 2008–09 academic year:
    - Medaille College for men's and women's lacrosse
    - Rutgers University–Camden for men's golf
    - the State University of New York at Oneonta (a.k.a. SUNY Oneonta) for men's tennis
    - and the University of Dallas for men's soccer, men's golf, men's & women's cross country, and men's & women's basketball (despite the latter's conference affiliation as an all-sports member remains as a D-III Independent school)
- 2009:
  - D'Youville left the NEAC to join the Allegheny Mountain Collegiate Conference (AMCC) after the 2008–09 academic year.
  - The College of Saint Elizabeth (now Saint Elizabeth University), Penn State University at Abington and the State University of New York at Morrisville (SUNY Morrisville) joined the NEAC in the 2009–10 academic year.
  - Dallas added women's volleyball to its NEAC associate membership in the 2009 fall season (2009–10 academic year).
  - The NEAC had accepted four associate member institutions in that same season. Additionally, the NEAC also began a three year partnership with the North Atlantic Conference (NAC) in four sports: baseball, women's lacrosse, and men's and women's tennis.
- 2010:
  - Two institutions left the NEAC as associate members, both effective after the 2009–10 academic year:
    - Dallas for most sports sponsored during its tenure
    - and SUNY Oneonta for men's tennis
  - Gallaudet University joined the NEAC in the 2010–11 academic year.
- 2011:
  - Lancaster Bible College joined the NEAC in the 2011–12 academic year.
    - Rutgers–Camden added men's tennis to its NEAC associate membership in the 2012 spring season (2011–12 academic year).
- 2012:
  - The partnership between the NEAC and the NAC ended for baseball and women's lacrosse after the 2011–12 academic year.
  - Hilbert College joined the NEAC as an associate member for men's lacrosse in the 2013 spring season (2012–13 academic year).
- 2013:
  - Penn State–Harrisburg left the NEAC to join the Capital Athletic Conference (CAC, now the Coast to Coast Athletic Conference or C2C) after the 2012–13 academic year.
  - Cedar Crest College joined the NEAC as an associate member for women's swimming in the 2013–14 academic year.
- 2014:
  - Rutgers–Camden left the NEAC as an associate member for men's tennis after the 2014 spring season (2013–14 academic year).
  - Wilson (Pa.) added men's sports into its athletic program in the 2014–15 academic year.
  - Bryn Athyn College and the Pennsylvania College of Technology (a.k.a. Penn College) joined the NEAC in the 2014–15 academic year.
  - The NEAC added men's volleyball along with four institutions as associate members for that sport (Hilbert and Medaille, former full member D'Youville, and Pennsylvania State University at Altoona [a.k.a. Penn State–Altoona]) in the 2015 spring season (2014–15 academic year).
- 2017 – Hilbert left the NEAC as an associate member for men's volleyball after the 2017 spring season (2016–17 academic year).
- 2018:
  - D'Youville, Medaille and Penn State–Altoona left the NEAC as associate members for men's volleyball after the 2018 spring season (2017–18 academic year).
  - Bryn Athyn and Wilson (Pa.) left the NEAC to join the CSAC after the 2017–18 academic year.
- 2019:
  - Saint Elizabeth (N.J.) left the NEAC to join the CSAC after the 2018–19 academic year.
  - Penn State–Harrisburg rejoined the NEAC in the 2019–20 academic year.
  - The State University of New York at Potsdam (a.k.a. SUNY Potsdam) joined the NEAC as an associate member for men's volleyball in the 2020 spring season (2019–20 academic year).
- 2020:
  - Three institutions left the NEAC as associate members, all effective after the 2019–20 academic year:
    - Alfred State for men's lacrosse
    - Cedar Crest for women's swimming
    - and SUNY Potsdam for men's volleyball
  - Four institutions left the NEAC to join their respective new home primary conferences, all effective after the 2019–20 academic year:
    - Cazenovia, SUNY Cobleskill and SUNY Poly for the NAC
    - and Keuka for the Empire 8 Athletic Conference (Empire 8)
  - Two institutions joined the NEAC as associate members, both effective in the 2020–21 academic year:
    - La Roche University for men's and women's lacrosse
    - and Mount Aloysius College for men's lacrosse
- 2021:
  - St. Mary's College of Maryland joined the NEAC in the 2021–22 academic year.
  - Rosemont College joined the NEAC as an associate member for men's golf (alongside former full member Wilson (Pa.) rejoining as an associate), both effective in the 2022 spring season (2021–22 academic year).
  - The NEAC was re-branded as the United East Conference, beginning the 2021–22 academic year.
- 2022:
  - Clarks Summit (formerly Baptist Bible) rejoined the United East as an associate member for men's golf and men's tennis in the 2023 spring season (2022–23 academic year).
  - The United East Conference and the Colonial States Athletic Conference (CSAC) announced their intent to merge, beginning with the 2023–24 academic year.
- 2023:
  - Four institutions left the United East as associate members, all effective after the 2022–23 academic year:
    - Hilbert for men's lacrosse
    - La Roche and Medaille for men's and women's lacrosse
    - Mount Aloysius for women's lacrosse
  - Two institutions left the United East to join their respective new home primary conferences, both effective after the 2022–23 academic year:
    - SUNY Morrisville to the NAC
    - and Wells to the AMCC
  - The United East and the CSAC officially announced that the merged conference would retain the United East name, officially ending the CSAC on July 1. Consequently, all ten members from the CSAC (Bryn Athyn College, Cairn University, Cedar Crest College, Clarks Summit University, Keystone College, Notre Dame of Maryland University, Rosemont College, Saint Elizabeth University, the University of Valley Forge and Wilson College of Pennsylvania) joined the United East as full members, beginning the 2023–24 academic year. Clarks Summit (formerly Baptist Bible), Keystone, Cairn (formerly Philadelphia Biblical), Wilson (Pa.), Saint Elizabeth (N.J.) and Bryn Athyn were all former full members at one point during their tenure within the United East (formerly known as the NEAC) before the rebrand in 2021.
  - Pennsylvania State University at Erie, The Behrend College (a.k.a. Penn State–Behrend) joined the United East as an associate member for men's and women's indoor and outdoor track & field (alongside former associate member Alfred State), both effective in the 2023–24 academic year.
- 2024:
  - Alfred State and Penn State–Behrend left the United East as associate members for men's and women's indoor and outdoor track & field after the 2023–24 academic year.
  - Clarks Summit left the United East after the 2023–24 academic year; after it abruptly ceased operations.
  - Pennsylvania State University Brandywine joined the United East in the 2024–25 academic year; the first new member after the merger.
  - Neumann University joined the United East as an associate member for men's volleyball in the 2025 season spring (2024–25 academic year).
- 2025:
  - Bryn Athyn left the United East after the 2024–25 academic year; as the school announced that it would discontinue all athletic programs.
  - Saint Elizabeth (N.J.) left the United East to join the AEC after the 2025–26 academic year.
  - Immaculata University joined the United East as an associate member for men's volleyball in the 2026 season spring (2025–26 academic year).
- 2026:
  - Rosemont left the United East after the 2025–26 academic year; as the school announced that it would merge with Villanova University beginning in 2027, and would transition its athletic programs to a club model.
  - United East and Atlantic East Conference will make a partnership in field hockey to field a 8-team league. Immaculata and Gwynedd Mercy University from Atlantic East will join as affiliate members in field hockey.
  - United East and Atlantic East will also make a partnership in men’s and women’s indoor track and field with Gwynedd Mercy, Immaculata, Marymount and Pratt joining United East as affiliate members in men’s and women’s indoor track and field.
  - University of Valley Forge announced its closure following the summer 2026 academic term.
- 2027 – The United East and Atlantic East announced that the United East would absorb the four remaining core members from the Atlantic East, resulting in the latter's dissolution. Consequently, Centenary University would join the United East as full member, with Gwynedd Mercy, Marymount and Immaculata upgrading from associate membership to full membership, all effective beginning in the 2027–28 academic year.

== Member schools ==
=== Current members ===
The United East currently has thirteen full members, nine of which are private, with two public and four hybrid:

Institution	Location	Founded	Affiliation	Enrollment	Nickname	Colors	Joined (Note: Represents the calendar year when fall sports competition begins.)
Cairn University (Note: Cairn was known as Philadelphia Biblical University throughout its first stint in the NEAC. It adopted its current name in 2012.)	Langhorne, Pennsylvania	1913	Nondenominational	2,200	Highlanders		2004; 2023 (Note: Cairn left the United East (then the NEAC on its first stint) after the 2007–08 school year before rejoining as a full member in 2023–24.)
Cedar Crest College (Note: This institution is a women's college, therefore it does not compete in men's sports.)	Allentown, Pennsylvania	1867	U.C.C.	1,820	Falcons		2023 (Note: Cedar Crest was an associate member for women's swimming between the 2013–14 and 2019–20 school years, before joining as a full member in 2023–24.)
Gallaudet University	Washington, D.C.	1864	Quasigovernmental	1,740	Bison		2010
Keystone College	La Plume, Pennsylvania	1868	Nonsectarian	1,600	Giants		2004; 2023 (Note: Keystone left the United East (then the NEAC on its first stint) after the 2007–08 school year before rejoining as a full member in 2023–24.)
Lancaster Bible College	Lancaster, Pennsylvania	1933	Nondenominational	954	Chargers		2011
Notre Dame of Maryland University (Note: This institution is a former women's college, which has eventually turned into a co-educational college (Rosemont since 2009–10, Wilson since 2013–14, and Notre Dame of Maryland since 2023–24).)	Baltimore, Maryland	1873	Catholic (SSND)	3,824	Gators		2023
Pennsylvania College of Technology (Penn College)	Williamsport, Pennsylvania	1914	Public	5,976	Wildcats		2014
Penn State Abington	Abington, Pennsylvania	1950	Hybrid (Note: Part of the Commonwealth System of Higher Education (CSHE) of Pennsylvania.)	3,400	Nittany Lions		2009
Penn State Berks	Reading, Pennsylvania	1958	Hybrid	3,216	Nittany Lions		2004
Penn State Brandywine	Middletown, Pennsylvania (Note: Located in Delaware County, Pennsylvania.)	1967	Hybrid	1,227	Lions		2024
Penn State Harrisburg	Middletown, Pennsylvania (Note: Located in Dauphin County, Pennsylvania.)	1966	Hybrid	1,695	Nittany Lions		2007; 2019 (Note: Penn State–Harrisburg left the United East (then the NEAC on its first stint) after the 2012–13 school year, before rejoining in 2019–20.)
St. Mary's College of Maryland	St. Mary's City, Maryland	1840	Public	1,517	Seahawks		2021
Wilson College	Chambersburg, Pennsylvania	1869	Presbyterian	1,098	Phoenix		2007; 2023 (Note: Wilson (Pa.) left the United East (then the NEAC on its first stint) after the 2017–18 school year, then joined as an associate member for men's golf, in the 2022 spring season (2021–22 school year) before rejoining as a full member in 2023–24.)

=== Future members ===
The United East will have four new full members, all private schools:

Institution	Location	Founded	Affiliation	Enrollment	Nickname	Joining (Note: Represents the calendar year when fall sports competition begins.)	Colors	Current conference
Centenary University	Hackettstown, New Jersey	1867	United Methodist	1,597	Cyclones	2027		Atlantic East (AEC)
Gwynedd Mercy University	Gwynedd Valley, Pennsylvania	1948	Catholic (Sisters of Mercy)	2,017	Griffins	2027 (Note: Gwynedd Mercy has been a United East associate member in field hockey and men's & women's indoor track & field since the 2026–27 academic year.)		Atlantic East (AEC)
Immaculata University	Immaculata, Pennsylvania	1940	Catholic (I.H.M.)	1,043	Mighty Macs	2027 (Note: Immaculata has been a United East associate member in men's volleyball since the 2025–26 academic year, and in field hockey and men's & women's indoor track & field since 2026–27.)		Atlantic East (AEC)
Marymount University	Arlington, Virginia	1950	Catholic (RSHM)	3,684	Saints	2027 (Note: Marymount has been a United East associate member in men's & women's indoor track & field since the 2026–27 academic year.)		Atlantic East (AEC)

=== Associate members ===
The United East currently has seven associate members; all but two are private schools.

Institution	Location	Founded	Affiliation	Enrollment	Nickname	Joined (Note: Represents the calendar year when fall sports competition begins.)	United East sport(s)	Primary conference
Carlow University	Pittsburgh, Pennsylvania	1929	Catholic (Sisters of Mercy)	2,400	Celtics	2023	Men's indoor track & field	Allegheny Mountain (AMCC)
Carlow University	Pittsburgh, Pennsylvania	1929	Catholic (Sisters of Mercy)	2,400	Celtics	2023	Men's outdoor track & field	Allegheny Mountain (AMCC)
Carlow University	Pittsburgh, Pennsylvania	1929	Catholic (Sisters of Mercy)	2,400	Celtics	2023	Women's indoor track & field	Allegheny Mountain (AMCC)
Carlow University	Pittsburgh, Pennsylvania	1929	Catholic (Sisters of Mercy)	2,400	Celtics	2023	Women's outdoor track & field	Allegheny Mountain (AMCC)
Immaculata University	East Whiteland, Pennsylvania (Note: The campus mailing address is "Immaculata".)	1920	Catholic (I.H.M.)	1,427	Mighty Macs	2025	Men's volleyball	Atlantic East (AEC)
Neumann University	Aston, Pennsylvania	1965	Catholic (Franciscan)	2,244	Knights	2024	Men's volleyball	Atlantic East (AEC) (MAC Commonwealth in 2026)
University of Pittsburgh at Bradford	Bradford, Pennsylvania	1963	Public	1,009	Panthers	2025	Men's lacrosse	Allegheny Mountain (AMCC)
Pratt Institute	Brooklyn, New York	1887	Private	5,137	Cannoneers	2023	Men's volleyball	Atlantic East (AEC)
Rutgers University–Camden (Note: Rutgers–Camden previously competed in the NEAC/United East as an associate member for men's tennis from the 2012 to 2014 spring seasons (2011–12 to 2013–14 school years).)	Camden, New Jersey	1766	Public	6,158	Scarlet; Raptors	2008	Men's golf	New Jersey (NJAC)
Saint Elizabeth University	Morristown, New Jersey	1899	Catholic (Sisters of Charity)	1,200	Eagles	2023	Men's volleyball	Atlantic East (AEC)

=== Former members ===
The United East had fourteen full members, all but four are private schools:

Institution	Location	Founded	Affiliation	Enrollment	Nickname	Joined (Note: Represents the calendar year when fall sports competition begins.)	Left (Note: Represents the calendar year when spring sports competition ends.)	Current conference
Bard College	Annandale-on- Hudson, New York	1860	Episcopal	2,062	Raptors	2004	2007	Liberty (LL)
Bryn Athyn College	Bryn Athyn, Pennsylvania	1877	New Church	330	Lions	2014; 2023 (Note: Bryn Athyn left the United East (then the NEAC on its first stint) after the 2017–18 school year before rejoining as a full member in 2023–24.)	2018; 2025	N/A (Note: Bryn Athyn discontinued its athletics program after the 2024–25 school year.)
Cazenovia College	Cazenovia, New York	1824	Nonsectarian	1,000	Wildcats	2004	2020	Closed in 2023
Chestnut Hill College	Philadelphia, Pennsylvania	1924	Catholic (S.S.J.)	2,000	Griffins	2004	2007	Central Atlantic (CACC) (Note: Currently an NCAA Division II athletic conference.)
Clarks Summit University (Note: Formerly known as Baptist Bible College & Seminary until 2015; later known as Summit University of Pennsylvania until 2016.)	Clarks Summit, Pennsylvania	1932	Baptist	1,142	Defenders	2004; 2023 (Note: Clarks Summit (when it was known as Baptist Bible College) was a former full member of the NEAC/United East from 2004–05 to 2007–08; later rejoined as an associate member for men's golf and men's tennis in the 2022–23 school year, before rejoining as a full member in 2023–24.)	2007; 2024	Closed in 2024
D'Youville University (Note: Currently known as D'Youville University since 2022.) (Note: D'Youville was an associate member for men's volleyball from the 2015 to 2017 spring seasons (2014–15 to 2016–17 school years).)	Buffalo, New York	1908	Catholic (Grey Nuns)	3,200	Spartans (Note: D'Youville changed its nickname from Spartans to Saints in 2020.)	2004	2009	East Coast (ECC)
Keuka College	Keuka Park, New York	1890	Nonsectarian	1,521	Wolves (Note: Keuka changed its nickname from Storm to Wolves in 2014.)	2004	2020	Empire 8 (E8)
New York University Tandon School of Engineering (Note: The NYU engineering school was the standalone Polytechnic University while in the NEAC. Polytechnic became affiliated with New York University (NYU) in 2008 as the Polytechnic Institute of New York University (athletically known as NYU Poly), and merged completely into NYU in 2014. And as part of the final merger of NYU Poly with NYU, Poly's athletics program was merged into that of NYU.) (NYU Poly)	Brooklyn, New York	1854	Nonsectarian	4,487	Fighting; Blue Jays	2004	2007	N/A
Rosemont College	Rosemont, Pennsylvania	1922	Catholic (SHCJ)	903	Ravens	2023 (Note: Rosemont was an associate member for men's golf since the 2021–22 school year, before joining as a full member in 2023–24.)	2026	N/A (Note: Due to its transition to club sports status before being merged into Villanova University, Rosemont competed in the United East on its final season for the 2025–26 school year, as an associate member for baseball, men's basketball, men's golf and women's volleyball.)
Saint Elizabeth University (Note: Saint Elizabeth (N.J.) was known as The College of Saint Elizabeth during its first stint as a member.) (Note: This institution is a former women's college, which has eventually turned into a co-educational college (Saint Elizabeth since 2016–17).)	Morristown, New Jersey	1899	Catholic (Sisters of Charity)	1,200	Eagles	2009; 2023 (Note: Saint Elizabeth left the United East (then the NEAC on its first stint) after the 2018–19 school year, before rejoining in 2023–24.)	2019; 2025	Atlantic East (AEC)
State University of New York at Cobleskill (SUNY Cobleskill)	Cobleskill, New York	1911	Public (Note: Part of the State University of New York System.)	2,500	Fighting; Tigers	2008	2020	North Atlantic (NAC)
State University of New York at Morrisville (SUNY Morrisville)	Morrisville, New York	1908	Public	2,486	Mustangs	2009	2023	S.U. New York (SUNYAC)
State University of New York Polytechnic Institute (SUNY Poly)	Utica, New York	1966	Public	2,760	Wildcats	2008	2020	Empire 8 (E8)
State University of New York at Purchase (SUNY Purchase)	Purchase, New York	1967	Public	4,000	Panthers	2004	2007	Skyline
Stevenson University (Note: Stevenson was known as Villa Julie College throughout its tenure in the NEAC. It adopted its current name in 2008.)	Stevenson, Maryland	1947	Nonsectarian	3,929	Mustangs	2004	2007	MAC Commonwealth
University of Valley Forge	Phoenixville, Pennsylvania	1939	Assemblies of God	742	Patriots	2023	2026	Closed in 2026
Wells College	Aurora, New York	1868	Nonsectarian	480	Express	2007	2023	Closed in 2024

=== Former associate members ===
The United East has had 16 former associate members, with ten being private schools and six public. One of these schools, Rutgers–Camden, is currently a United East associate in a different sport.

Institution	Location	Founded	Affiliation	Enrollment	Nickname	Joined (Note: Represents the calendar year when fall sports competition begins.)	Left (Note: Represents the calendar year when spring sports competition ends.)	United East sport(s)	Primary conference
Alfred State College	Alfred, New York	1908	Public (Note: Part of the State University of New York System.)	3,737	Pioneers	2019	2020	Men's lacrosse	Allegheny Mountain (AMCC)
Alfred State College	Alfred, New York	1908	Public	3,737	Pioneers	2023	2024	Men's indoor track & field	Allegheny Mountain (AMCC)
Alfred State College	Alfred, New York	1908	Public	3,737	Pioneers	2023	2024	Men's outdoor track & field	Allegheny Mountain (AMCC)
Alfred State College	Alfred, New York	1908	Public	3,737	Pioneers	2023	2024	Women's indoor track & field	Allegheny Mountain (AMCC)
Alfred State College	Alfred, New York	1908	Public	3,737	Pioneers	2023	2024	Women's outdoor track & field	Allegheny Mountain (AMCC)
Cedar Crest College	Allentown, Pennsylvania	1867	U.C.C.	1,885	Falcons	2013	2020	Women's swimming	United East (Note: Cedar Crest was an associate member for women's swimming between the 2013–14 and 2019–20 school years, before joining as a full member in 2023–24.)
Clarks Summit University (Note: Formerly known as Baptist Bible College & Seminary until 2015; later known as Summit University of Pennsylvania until 2016.) (Note: Clark Summit (when it was known as Baptist Bible College) was a former full member of the NEAC/United East from 2004–05 to 2007–08; later rejoined as an associate member for men's golf and men's tennis in the 2022–23 school year, before rejoining as a full member in 2023–24.)	Clarks Summit, Pennsylvania	1932	Baptist	1,142	Defenders	2022	2023	Men's golf	Closed in 2024
Clarks Summit University	Clarks Summit, Pennsylvania	1932	Baptist	1,142	Defenders	2022	2023	Men's tennis	Closed in 2024
University of Dallas	Irving, Texas	1956	Catholic	2,576	Crusaders	2008	2010	Various (Note: Dallas competed in what was then the NEAC for some sports (men's soccer, men's golf, men's & women's cross country, and men's & women's basketball joined from 2008-09 to 2009-10; later women's volleyball in the 2010 spring season [2009–10 academic year]).)	Southern (SCAC)
D'Youville College (Note: Currently known as D'Youville University since 2022.) (Note: D'Youville was a full member of the NEAC/United East from 2004–05 to 2008–09.)	Buffalo, New York	1908	Catholic (Grey Nuns)	3,200	Spartans (Note: D'Youville changed its nickname from Spartans to Saints in 2020.)	2014	2018	Men's volleyball (Note: The AMCC began sponsoring men's volleyball in the 2018 spring season (2017–18 school year).)	East Coast (ECC) (Note: Currently an NCAA Division II athletic conference.)
Hilbert College	Hamburg, New York	1957	Catholic (Franciscans)	1,100	Hawks	2014	2017	Men's volleyball	Allegheny Mountain (AMCC)
Hilbert College	Hamburg, New York	1957	Catholic (Franciscans)	1,100	Hawks	2012	2023	Men's lacrosse	Allegheny Mountain (AMCC)
La Roche University	McCandless, Pennsylvania (Note: The campus has a Pittsburgh mailing address.)	1963	Private	1,465	Redhawks	2020	2023	Men's lacrosse	Allegheny Mountain (AMCC)
La Roche University	McCandless, Pennsylvania	1963	Private	1,465	Redhawks	2020	2023	Women's lacrosse	Allegheny Mountain (AMCC)
Medaille University	Buffalo, New York	1937	Nonsectarian	3,253	Mavericks	2008	2023	Men's lacrosse	Closed in 2023
Medaille University	Buffalo, New York	1937	Nonsectarian	3,253	Mavericks	2008	2023	Women's lacrosse	Closed in 2023
Medaille University	Buffalo, New York	1937	Nonsectarian	3,253	Mavericks	2014	2018	Men's volleyball	Closed in 2023
Mount Aloysius College	Cresson, Pennsylvania	1853	Catholic (RSM)	1,600	Mounties	2020	2023	Women's lacrosse	Allegheny Mountain (AMCC)
Penn State–Altoona	Altoona, Pennsylvania	1939	Hybrid (Note: Part of the Commonwealth System of Higher Education (CSHE) of Pennsylvania.)	4,182	Nittany; Lions	2014	2018	Men's volleyball	Allegheny Mountain (AMCC)
Penn State Behrend	Erie, Pennsylvania	1948	Hybrid	4,700	Lions	2023	2024	Men's indoor track & field	Allegheny Mountain (AMCC)
Penn State Behrend	Erie, Pennsylvania	1948	Hybrid	4,700	Lions	2023	2024	Men's outdoor track & field	Allegheny Mountain (AMCC)
Penn State Behrend	Erie, Pennsylvania	1948	Hybrid	4,700	Lions	2023	2024	Women's indoor track & field	Allegheny Mountain (AMCC)
Penn State Behrend	Erie, Pennsylvania	1948	Hybrid	4,700	Lions	2023	2024	Women's outdoor track & field	Allegheny Mountain (AMCC)
Rosemont College (Note: This institution is a former women's college, which has eventually turned into a co-educational college (Rosemont since 2009–10, Wilson since 2013–14, Saint Elizabeth since 2016–17, and Notre Dame of Maryland since 2023–24).)	Rosemont, Pennsylvania	1922	Catholic (SHCJ)	903	Ravens	2021	2023 (Note: Rosemont was an associate member for men's golf since the 2021–22 school year, before joining as a full member in 2023–24.)	Men's golf	United East
Rutgers University–Camden (Note: Rutgers–Camden remains in the United East as an associate member for men's golf.)	Camden, New Jersey	1766	Public	6,158	Scarlet; Raptors	2011	2014	Men's tennis	New Jersey (NJAC)
State University of New York at Oneonta (SUNY Oneonta)	Oneonta, New York	1816	Public	3,098	Bears	2008	2010	Men's tennis	S.U. New York (SUNYAC)
State University of New York at Potsdam (SUNY Potsdam)	Potsdam, New York	1816	Public	3,098	Bears	2019	2020	Men's volleyball	S.U. New York (SUNYAC)
Wilson College	Chambersburg, Pennsylvania	1869	Presbyterian	1,098	Phoenix	2021	2023 (Note: Wilson (Pa.) left the United East (then the NEAC on its first stint) after the 2017–18 school year, then joined as an associate member for men's golf, in the 2022 spring season (2021–22 school year) before rejoining as a full member in 2023–24.)	Men's golf	United East

=== Membership timeline ===
Full member (all sports) Full member (non-football) Associate member (football) Associate member (sport)

== Sports ==
=== Conference sports ===
The United East sponsors championships in the following sports:

Sport	Men's	Women's
Baseball	✓	
Basketball	✓	✓
Cross country	✓	✓
Field hockey		✓
Golf	✓	
Lacrosse	✓	✓
Soccer	✓	✓
Softball		✓
Tennis	✓	✓
Track & field (indoor)	✓	✓
Track & field (outdoor)	✓	✓
Volleyball	✓	✓

=== Men's sports ===
School	Baseball	Basketball	Cross country	Golf	Lacrosse	Soccer	Tennis	Track & Field (Indoor)	Track & Field (Outdoor)	Volleyball	Total UEC Sports
Cairn	✓	✓	✓	✗	✓	✓	✓	✗	✗	✓	7
Gallaudet	✗	✓	✓	✗	✗	✓	✗	✓	✓	✓	6
Keystone	✓	✓	✓	✗	✗	✓	✗	✗	✓	✗	5
Lancaster Bible	✓	✓	✓	✓	✗	✓	✓	✓	✓	✓	9
Notre Dame (MD)	✓	✓	✓	✗	✓	✓	✗	✗	✗	✗	5
Penn College	✓	✓	✓	✓	✓	✓	✓	✗	✗	✗	7
Penn State Abington	✓	✓	✓	✓	✗	✓	✓	✗	✓	✗	7
Penn State Berks	✓	✓	✓	✓	✗	✓	✓	✓	✗	✗	7
Penn State Brandywine	✓	✓	✓	✓	✗	✓	✓	✗	✗	✗	6
Penn State Harrisburg	✓	✓	✓	✓	✗	✓	✓	✓	✓	✗	8
St. Mary's	✓	✓	✓	✗	✓	✓	✓	✓	✓	✗	8
Wilson	✓	✓	✗	✓	✗	✓	✗	✗	✗	✓	5
Totals	12	13	12	7+1	4	13	8	5+1	7+1	5+2	86+5
Associate Members
Carlow								✓	✓		2
Immaculata										✓	1
Pratt										✓	1
Rutgers-Camden				✓							1

Notes

Men's varsity sports not sponsored by the United East that are played by United East schools

School	Football	Rowing	Sailing	Swimming	Wrestling
Gallaudet	SCAC	✗	✗	AEC	✗
Keystone	IND	✗	✗	✗	IND
Penn College	✗	✗	✗	✗	AMCC
St. Mary's	✗	MARC	MAISA	AEC	✗

=== Women's sports ===
School	Basketball	Cross country	Field Hockey	Flag Football	Lacrosse	Soccer	Softball	Tennis	Track & Field (Indoor)	Track & Field (Outdoor)	Volleyball	Total UEC Sports
Cairn	✓	✓	✗	✓	✗	✓	✓	✓	✗	✗	✓	7
Cedar Crest	✓	✓	✓	✓	✓	✓	✓	✓	✗	✓	✓	10
Gallaudet	✓	✓	✗	✓	✗	✗	✓	✗	✓	✓	✓	7
Keystone	✓	✓	✓	✓	✗	✓	✓	✗	✗	✓	✓	8
Lancaster Bible	✓	✓	✓	✓	✗	✓	✓	✓	✓	✓	✓	10
Notre Dame (MD)	✓	✓	✗	✗	✓	✓	✓	✓	✗	✓	✓	8
Penn College	✓	✓	✗	✗	✗	✓	✓	✓	✗	✗	✓	6
Penn State Abington	✓	✓	✗	✗	✗	✓	✓	✓	✗	✓	✓	7
Penn State Berks	✓	✓	✗	✗	✗	✓	✓	✓	✓	✗	✓	7
Penn State Brandywine	✓	✓	✗	✗	✗	✓	✓	✓	✗	✗	✓	6
Penn State Harrisburg	✓	✓	✓	✗	✗	✓	✓	✓	✓	✓	✓	9
St. Mary's	✓	✓	✓	✗	✓	✓	✗	✓	✓	✓	✓	9
Wilson	✓	✗	✓	✗	✓	✓	✓	✗	✗	✗	✓	6
Totals	14	13	6	5	4	13	13	10	5+1	9+1	14	106+2
Associate Member
Carlow									✓	✓		2

Notes

Women's varsity sports not sponsored by the United East that are played by United East schools

School	Equestrian	Golf	Rowing	Sailing	Swimming	Triathlon	Wrestling
Cedar Crest	✗	✗	✗	✗	AEC	✗	IND
Gallaudet	✗	✗	✗	✗	AEC	✓	✗
Lancaster Bible	✗	IND	✗	✗	✗	✗	✗
St. Mary's	✗	✗	MARC	MAISA	AEC	✗	✗
Wilson	IHSA	✗	✗	✗	✗	✗	✗

== See also ==
- Atlantic East Conference - Current Division III conference that will be absorbed by the United East after the 2026-27 season
- Colonial States Athletic Conference – Former Division III conference that was absorbed by the United East
