= University of Valley Forge =

Private university in Pennsylvania, US

Coordinates: 40.1186°N 75.5484°W

- Former names: Eastern Bible Institute (1939–1962); Northeast Bible Institute (1962–1975); Northeast Bible College (1975–1977); Valley Forge Christian College (1977–2014)
- Type: Private college
- Active: 1939–2026
- Religious affiliation: Assemblies of God USA
- Location: Phoenixville postal address, Pennsylvania, United States
- Campus: Suburban
- Website: www.valleyforge.edu

The University of Valley Forge (UVF) was a private college near Phoenixville, Pennsylvania, United States. It was 8.8 miles (14.2 km) from Valley Forge National Historical Park. Although affiliated with the Assemblies of God USA, the denomination did not control the school. The institution closed at the end of the summer 2026 academic term.

The college, in Chester County, was partially in Charlestown Township, while the other part was in Schuylkill Township. It had a Phoenixville postal address.

== History ==
The University of Valley Forge began as a summer Bible School on the campgrounds of Maranatha Park in Green Lane, Pennsylvania, in 1932. It existed for the training of pastors, evangelists, missionaries, Christian education workers, and lay workers. The summer Bible School grew into a permanent Bible School and, in 1939, was chartered as Eastern Bible Institute. Mergers with the Beulah Heights Bible Institute, Metropolitan Bible Institute, New England Bible Institute, and Pine Crest Bible School resulted in increased enrollment and a name change to Northeast Bible Institute in 1962. The school received its accreditation from the state in 1975 and subsequently became the Northeast Bible College.

The institute moved in 1976 to the campus of the former Valley Forge Army Hospital in Phoenixville. One year later, the school changed its name to reflect its new location, becoming the Valley Forge Christian College.

In the summer of 2002, the college was granted accreditation with Middle States Commission on Higher Education.

In December 2013, the National Christian Conference Center, located approximately 4 miles from the main campus, at 1485 Valley Forge Rd in Phoenixville, was gifted to the college and was renamed The Conference Center at Valley Forge. With a value of over $10 million USD, the center became the biggest gift VFCC had ever received. It brought the college into Middle States Standard VI compliance.

The building and property gift changed the finances of the location to become taxable. Additionally, the management of the facility and the staff needed to care for the center increased spending. What started as a miracle gift on paper, became a cash flow nightmare. The tuition-driven financial model of the college, with no endowment, meant enrollment growth was needed to be able to sustain. University status became part of that answer, as a way to be able to expand academic offerings through graduate programs. Institutional debt rose to $32 million as enrollment continued to decline.

Valley Forge Christian College officially changed its name to the University of Valley Forge on September 16, 2014.

On July 29, 2026, the institution's board of trustees announced their decision to suspend academic operations at the end of the summer 2026 semester due to significant financial challenges.

== Academics ==
The University of Valley Forge was authorized by the Department of Education of the Commonwealth of Pennsylvania to grant the degrees of Master of Arts, Bachelor of Arts, Bachelor of Music, Bachelor of Religious Education, Bachelor of Science, Bachelor of Social Work, Associate of Arts, and Associate of Science.

== Athletics ==
UVF teams, known as the Patriots, competed at the Division III level of the National Collegiate Athletic Association (NCAA). The institution joined the Colonial States Athletic Conference in the 2020-2021 academic year. UVF then became a member of the United East Conference after the pre-existing UEC and CSAC merged in 2023. Men's sports included baseball, basketball, cross country, soccer, and volleyball; while women's sports included basketball, cross country, soccer, softball, and volleyball. Intramural golf and cross country were also offered as club sports.

== See also ==
- Valley Forge Christian College v. Americans United for Separation of Church & State
