= Clarks Summit University =

Christian school in Pennsylvania, U.S.

Coordinates: 41.495°N 75.685°W

- Former names: Baptist Bible Seminary (1932–1971); Baptist Bible College of Pennsylvania (1971–2015); Summit Univ. (2015-2016)
- Motto: Preparing Christ-centered, Career-ready graduates
- Type: Private Bible college
- Active: 1932–2024
- Religious affiliation: Baptist
- Location: Clarks Summit, Pennsylvania, U.S.
- Campus: Suburban
- Colors: Royal blue, cool grey, charcoal
- Nickname: Defenders
- Website: www.clarkssummitu.edu

Clarks Summit University was a private Baptist Bible college in Clarks Summit, Pennsylvania that offered associate, bachelor's, master's, and doctoral degrees as well as a high-school dual enrollment option. Besides offering degrees on campus, it also offered undergraduate and graduate degrees online.

In 2024, the institution began to publicly suffer from significant financial challenges. It closed on July 1, 2024, less than a month after announcing an employee furlough.

The university was associated with the General Association of Regular Baptist Churches

== History ==
The school was founded as the Baptist Bible Seminary in 1932 in Johnson City, New York.

For its first 36 years, the college used the facilities of First Baptist Church in Johnson City. Additional buildings were purchased or built to accommodate the growing student body.

Steady growth of enrollment by the 1960s prompted school leaders to search for a new location. In 1968, a site in Clarks Summit was found with the help of Gov. William Scranton.

The school received its accreditation from the Association for Biblical Higher Education in 1968 and received approval to grant degrees from the Pennsylvania Department of Education in 1969. These developments, along with the offering of associates of arts degrees, led the school to change its name again in 1971, becoming the Baptist Bible College of Pennsylvania. Baptist Bible Seminary became a division of the college in 1972, taking on the original name of the college from its foundation in 1934.

Graduate studies began in 1989.

The name was changed to Summit University in 2015 and Clarks Summit University in 2016.

=== Closure ===
On June 5, 2024, the university's president sent an email to alumni and boosters announcing that he had temporarily furloughed all staff. President Jim Lytle wrote in the email that "The full administration - president and cabinet members - [had] already committed to volunteer at CSU without pay during this temporary furlough." This was brought about due to a "significant gap" in the university's finances.

Less than one month later, on July 1, 2024, the university's board of trustees announced publicly on the university's website that the university was beginning the process of closure and classes would not be offered for fall 2024. They also announced teach-out plans with Liberty University and Cairn University. The teach out plan, however, was not accepted by the state of Pennsylvania, though a significant number of students were accepted to Cairn along with many of the former faculty and staff.

== Campus ==
Clarks Summit University was located on a 141-acre (57 ha) suburban campus. The site included 17 major buildings, athletic facilities, and a 4.5-acre lake.

Huckaby Gymnasium in the Phelps Student Center hosted home basketball and volleyball contests.

== Academics ==
The university had more than 80 programs including associate, bachelor's, master's, and doctoral degrees. All students who earned a bachelor's degree earned a major in Biblical Studies as well as their chosen career major. Clarks Summit University was accredited by the Middle States Commission on Higher Education and the Association for Biblical Higher Education. Its education programs were approved by the Pennsylvania Department of Education.

== Athletics ==
The Clarks Summit Defenders colors were royal blue, silver (cool gray), and black (charcoal).

The Clarks Summit Defenders fielded teams in several sports. Men's teams included soccer, basketball, golf, cross-country, tennis, volleyball and baseball. Women's teams include basketball, cross-country, soccer, softball, tennis, and volleyball.

Clarks Summit University was affiliated with the National Collegiate Athletic Association (NCAA) Division III and competed in the United East Conference after the conference merged with the Colonial States Athletic Conference, which the Defenders were full time members of at the time.

Athletic history included 75 National Christian College Athletic Association (NCCAA) Division II East Regional Championships in seven sports and 23 NCCAA Division II National Championships in six sports. Defender teams have appeared in three NCAA Division III national tournaments (tennis, volleyball, and women's basketball). The Lady Defender basketball team earned a spot in the NCAA DIII playoffs after winning the Colonial States Athletic Conference championship in 2022. Clarks Summit University has had two individual National Collegiate Wrestling Association (NCWA) champions in wrestling. The first Defender to compete at the NCAA national level was a member of the wrestling team.

During the October 6–7, 2023 Homecoming Weekend, the university renamed Defender Field, home to its soccer programs, to Davis & Jacobs Field in honor of long-time coaches Chris Davis and Roger Jacobs. Davis served for 23 seasons as the women's soccer coach, winning 6 NCCAA Division II titles and 1 North Eastern Athletic Conference for a birth in the NCAA Division III tournament and Roger Jacobs served as men's basketball coach for 16 years, leading the school to 4 NCCAA Division II National titles and having a career coaching record of 208–161–14.

== Notable alumni ==
- Robert Sumner (1922–2016), author and pastor
