= Atlantic East Conference =

American college athletic conference

- Association: NCAA
- Founded: 2018
- Commissioner: Rebecca Mullen (Interim) (since July 2024)
- Sports fielded: 21
- Division: Division III
- No. of teams: 6
- Headquarters: Lancaster, Pennsylvania, U.S.
- Region: Mid-Atlantic
- Website: atlanticeast.com

Locations
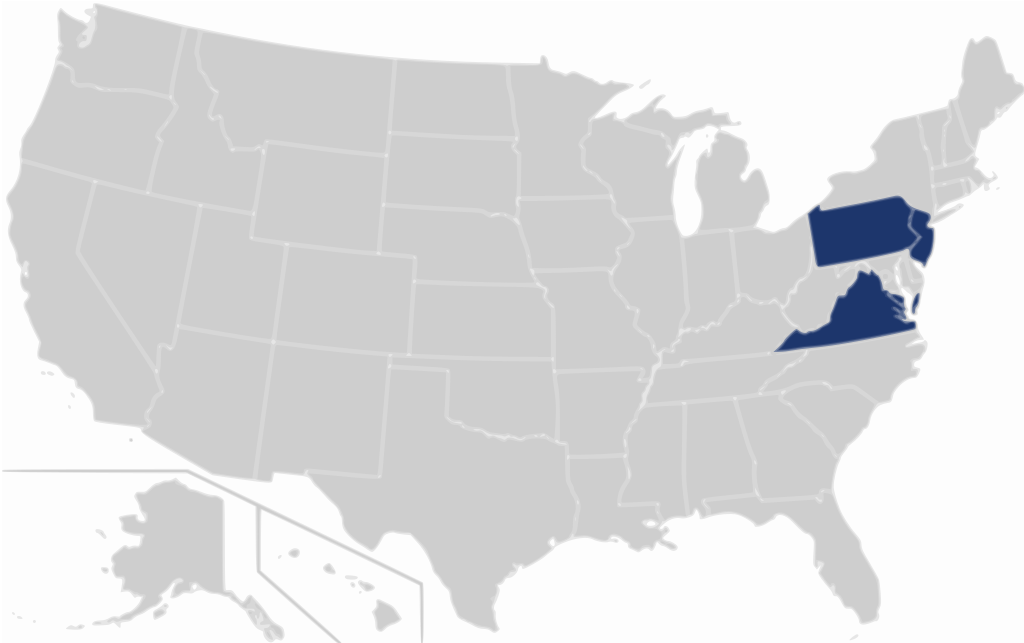

The Atlantic East Conference is an intercollegiate athletic conference that competes in the National Collegiate Athletic Association (NCAA) Division III and is located in the Mid-Atlantic region of the United States.

On August 11, 2026, the conference announced it would disband following the 2026–27 school year.

== History ==
Atlantic East Conference
Location of AEC members:
full
affiliate

Beginning play in July 2018, the league consists of seven private universities, each former members of either the Capital Athletic Conference, since renamed the Coast to Coast Athletic Conference (C2C), or the Colonial States Athletic Conference (CSAC). The charter members consisted of Cabrini University, Gwynedd Mercy University, Immaculata University, Marymount University, Marywood University, Neumann University and Wesley College.

On May 31, 2018, Jessica Huntley was named the inaugural commissioner of the Atlantic East.

On September 16, 2019, the AEC announced its first affiliate member, St. Mary's College of Maryland, who would participate in field hockey starting in the 2020–21 season. This will ultimately be St. Mary's only season in AEC field hockey, as that school will join the North Eastern Athletic Conference (NEAC), which sponsors that sport, for 2021–22 and beyond. The United East Conference (formerly NEAC), reversed their decision to add field hockey, thus St. Mary's remained as an affiliate in the sport.

On November 19, 2019, it was announced that William Paterson University will become an affiliate member in men's golf starting in the 2019–20 season.

On January 12, 2020, it was announced that Cedar Crest College would join the AEC as an affiliate member in women's swimming & diving.

On August 17, 2020 and August 19, 2020, it was announced that Gallaudet University and St. Mary's College of Maryland, respectively, would also become an affiliate member in men's and women's swimming and diving.

On July 9, 2020, Delaware State University announced that it would acquire Wesley College starting in the 2021–22 school year, due to the financial struggles Wesley faced due to the COVID-19 pandemic.

On June 18, 2021, Centenary University announced its move to Atlantic East from the CSAC also in 2021–22. Centenary is the conference's only non-Catholic member institution to join.

On June 29, 2021, New Jersey City University announced that it would be joining the Atlantic East as an affiliate member in men's and women's golf starting in the 2021–22 season.

In 2023, the conference announced that it would add women's flag football as a fully sponsored sport, with the first season planned for spring 2025. The first season took place on the announced schedule, with the initial membership consisting of full members Centenary, Immaculata, Marymount, and Neumann and associate members Eastern University; NCAA Division II member Holy Family University; and Penn State Schuylkill, a member of the United States Collegiate Athletic Association instead of the NCAA. In 2025–26, full conference member Marywood added the sport, and another Division II member, Chestnut Hill College, joined as an associate member. The AEC is the first NCAA conference to officially sponsor flag football.

After Pratt Institute and Saint Elizabeth University announced that both would join the City University of New York Athletic Conference starting in the 2027–28 athletic season, on August 11, 2026, the Atlantic East announced that following the 2026–27 school year, the remaining four institutions will join the United East.

=== Chronological timeline ===
- 2018 – The Atlantic East Conference was founded. Charter members included Cabrini University, Gwynedd Mercy University, Immaculata University, Marymount University, Marywood University, Neumann University and Wesley College, beginning the 2018–19 academic year.
- 2019 – William Paterson University joined the Atlantic East as an associate member for men's golf in the 2020 spring season (2019–20 academic year).
- 2020 – Three institutions joined the Atlantic East as associate members, all effective in the 2020–21 academic year:
  - Gallaudet University for men's and women's swimming & diving
  - St. Mary's College of Maryland for field hockey and men's and women's swimming & diving
  - and Cedar Crest College for women's swimming and diving
- 2021:
  - Wesley left the Atlantic East after the 2020–21 academic year; as the school announced that it would be acquired by Delaware State University, therefore ceasing operations.
  - Centenary College of New Jersey (now Centenary University) joined the Atlantic East in the 2021–22 academic year.
  - New Jersey City University (NJCU) joined the Atlantic East as an associate member for men's and women's golf in the 2022 spring season (2021–22 academic year).
- 2023:
  - New Jersey City (NJCU) left the Atlantic East as an associate member for men's and women's golf after the 2023 spring season (2022–23 academic year).
  - The Atlantic East announced that it would add women's flag football as a fully sponsored sport, with a planned start date of the 2025 spring season (2024–25 academic year).
- 2024:
  - Two institutions left the Atlantic East as associate members, both effective after the 2023–24 academic year:
    - St. Mary's (Maryland) for field hockey
    - and William Paterson for men's golf
  - Cabrini left the Atlantic East after the 2023–24 academic year; as the school announced that it had been sold to nearby Villanova University and had ceased operations.
  - Pratt Institute joined the Atlantic East in the 2024–25 academic year.
  - Also in the 2024–25 academic year, the Atlantic East became the first NCAA conference to sponsor women's flag football as a varsity sport.
- 2025 – Saint Elizabeth University joined the Atlantic East in the 2025–26 academic year.
- 2026 – Marywood and Neumann both left the Atlantic East to join the Middle Atlantic Conferences, beginning the 2026–27 academic year.
- 2027 – The Atlantic East announced that it would dissolve at the conclusion of the 2026–27 academic year; as many schools will leave to join their respective new home primary conferences, beginning the 2027–28 school year:
  - Centenary, Gwynedd Mercy, Immaculata, and Marymount will join the United East Conference.
  - Pratt and Saint Elizabeth will join the City University of New York Athletic Conference.

== Member schools ==
=== Full members ===
The AEC currently has six full members, all are private schools:

Member departing for the United East Conference on July 1, 2027.
Member departing for the City University of New York Athletic Conference on July 1, 2027.

Institution	Location	Founded	Affiliation	Enrollment	Nickname	Joined (Note: Represents the calendar year when fall sports competition begins.)	Colors
Centenary University	Hackettstown, New Jersey	1867	United Methodist	1,597	Cyclones	2021	
Gwynedd Mercy University	Gwynedd Valley, Pennsylvania	1948	Catholic (Sisters of Mercy)	2,017	Griffins	2018	
Immaculata University	Immaculata, Pennsylvania	1940	Catholic (I.H.M.)	1,043	Mighty Macs	2018	
Marymount University	Arlington, Virginia	1950	Catholic (RSHM)	3,684	Saints	2018	
Pratt Institute	Brooklyn, New York	1887	Nonsectarian	4,907	Cannoneers	2024	
Saint Elizabeth University	Morristown, New Jersey	1899	Catholic (Sisters of Charity)	1,200	Eagles	2025	

=== Associate members ===
The AEC currently has four associate members, one being a public school, one being a privately governed but state-supported institution, and the rest being private schools.

Institution	Location	Founded	Affiliation	Enrollment	Nickname	Joined (Note: Represents the calendar year when fall sports competition begins.)	AEC sport(s)	Primary conference
Cedar Crest College	Allentown, Pennsylvania	1867	United Church of Christ	1,885	Falcons	2020	Women's swimming	United East
Gallaudet University	Washington, D.C.	1864	Nonsectarian (Quasi-governmental)	1,740	Bison	2020	Men's swimming	United East
Gallaudet University	Washington, D.C.	1864	Nonsectarian (Quasi-governmental)	1,740	Bison	2020	Women's swimming	United East
Penn State Schuylkill	Schuylkill Haven, Pennsylvania	1934	State-related	594	Nittany Lions	2024	Women's flag football	Penn State U. (PSUAC) (Note: Currently an USCAA athletic conference.)
St. Mary's College of Maryland (Note: St. Mary's (Md.) competed in the Atlantic East as an associate member for field hockey from the 2020 to 2023 fall seasons (2020–21 to 2023–24 school years).)	St. Mary's City, Maryland	1840	Public	1,950	Seahawks	2020	Men's swimming	United East
St. Mary's College of Maryland	St. Mary's City, Maryland	1840	Public	1,950	Seahawks	2020	Women's swimming	United East

=== Former members ===
The AEC had four former full members, all private schools:

Institution	Location	Founded	Affiliation	Enrollment	Nickname	Joined (Note: Represents the calendar year when fall sports competition begins.)	Left (Note: Represents the calendar year when spring sports competition ends.)	Current conference
Cabrini University	Radnor, Pennsylvania	1957	Catholic (Missionary Sisters)	1,759	Cavaliers	2018	2024	N/A (Note: Cabrini was acquired by Villanova University in 2024.)
Marywood University	Scranton, Pennsylvania	1915	Catholic (I.H.M.)	2,470	Pacers	2018	2026	MAC Freedom
Neumann University	Aston, Pennsylvania	1965	Catholic (Franciscan)	3,000	Knights	2018	2026	MAC Commonwealth
Wesley College	Dover, Delaware	1873	United Methodist	2,400	Wolverines	2018	2021	N/A (Note: Wesley was acquired by Delaware State University in 2021.)

=== Former associate members ===
The AEC had seven former associate members, four were private schools.

Institution	Location	Founded	Affiliation	Enrollment	Nickname	Joined (Note: Represents the calendar year when fall sports competition begins.)	Left (Note: Represents the calendar year when spring sports competition ends.)	AEC sport(s)	Primary conference
Chestnut Hill College	Philadelphia, Pennsylvania	1924	Catholic (CSJ)	1,072	Griffins	2025	2026	Women's flag football	Central Atlantic (CACC) (Note: Currently an NCAA Division II athletic conference.)
Eastern University	St. Davids, Pennsylvania	1925	Baptist (ABC USA)	4,429	Eagles	2024	2026	Women's flag football	MAC Commonwealth
Holy Family University	Philadelphia, Pennsylvania	1954	Catholic (CSFN)	2,955	Tigers	2024	2026	Women's flag football	Central Atlantic (CACC)
Manhattanville University	Purchase, New York	1841	Nonsectarian (Note: Formerly affiliated with the Society of the Sacred Heart (RSCJ) within the Catholic Church until the 1970s.)	2,494	Valiants	2022	2026	Field hockey	Skyline
New Jersey City University	Jersey City, New Jersey	1929	Public	7,300	Gothic Knights	2021	2023	Men's golf	New Jersey (NJAC)
New Jersey City University	Jersey City, New Jersey	1929	Public	7,300	Gothic Knights	2021	2023	Women's golf	New Jersey (NJAC)
St. Mary's College of Maryland (Note: St. Mary's (Md.) remains in the Atlantic East as an associate member for men's and women's swimming.)	St. Mary's City, Maryland	1840	Public	1,950	Seahawks	2020	2024	Field hockey	United East
William Paterson University	Wayne, New Jersey	1855	Public	10,970	Pioneers	2019	2024	Men's golf	New Jersey (NJAC)

=== Membership timeline ===
Full member (all sports) Full member (non-football) Associate member (football) Associate member (sport)

== Sports ==
The Atlantic East sponsored 20 sports at its launch—nine for men and 11 for women. The conference has since added flag football as a 12th women's sport.

Conference sports
Sport	Men's	Women's
Baseball	✓	
Basketball	✓	✓
Cross country	✓	✓
Field hockey		✓
Flag football		✓
Lacrosse	✓	✓
Soccer	✓	✓
Softball		✓
Swimming	✓	✓
Tennis	✓	✓
Track & field (outdoor)	✓	✓
Volleyball	✓	✓

=== Men's sponsored sports by school ===
School	Baseball	Basketball	Cross country	Lacrosse	Soccer	Swimming	Tennis	Track & field (outdoor)	Volleyball	Total AEC sports
Centenary	✓	✓	✓	✓	✓	✗	✗	✗	✓	6
Gwynedd Mercy	✓	✓	✓	✓	✓	✗	✗	✓	✓	7
Immaculata	✓	✓	✓	✓	✓	✓	✓	✓	✓	9
Marymount	✓	✓	✓	✓	✓	✓	✓	✓	✓	9
Pratt	✗	✓	✓	✗	✓	✗	✓	✓	✓	6
Saint Elizabeth	✓	✓	✓	✗	✓	✗	✗	✓	✓	6
Totals	5	6	6	4	6	2+2	3	5	6	43+2
Gallaudet						✓				1
St. Mary's						✓				1

==== Men's varsity sports not sponsored by the Atlantic East Conference that are played by Atlantic East schools ====
School	Equestrian	Esports (Note: Non NCAA)	Golf	Track & field (indoor)	Wrestling
Centenary	IHSA (Note: Centenary's equestrian program is not sponsored by the NCAA but through the Intercollegiate Horse Show Association.)	✗	✗	✗	IND
Gwynedd Mercy	✗	✗	✗	United East	✗
Immaculata	✗	✓	✗	United East	✗
Marymount	✗	✗	MASCAC	United East	IND
Pratt	IHSA (Note: Pratt's equestrian program is governed by the Intercollegiate Horse Show Association.)	✗	IND	United East	✗

=== Women's sponsored sports by school ===
School	Basketball	Cross country	Field hockey	Flag football (Note: The NCAA has recommended flag football for addition to its Emerging Sports for Women program. All three divisions are set to vote on this proposal no later than the January 2026 NCAA convention.)	Lacrosse	Soccer	Softball	Swimming	Tennis	Track & field (outdoor)	Volleyball	Total AEC sports
Centenary	✓	✓	✗	✓	✓	✓	✓	✗	✗	✗	✓	7
Gwynedd Mercy	✓	✓	✓	✗	✓	✓	✓	✗	✗	✓	✓	8
Immaculata	✓	✓	✓	✓	✓	✓	✓	✓	✓	✓	✓	11
Marymount	✓	✓	✗	✓	✓	✓	✓	✓	✓	✓	✓	10
Pratt	✓	✓	✗	✗	✗	✓	✗	✗	✓	✓	✓	6
Saint Elizabeth	✓	✓	✗	✗	✗	✓	✓	✗	✗	✓	✓	6
Totals	6	6	2+1	3+3	4	6	5	2+3	3	5	6	48+7
Cedar Crest								✓				1
Eastern				✓								1
Gallaudet								✓				1
Holy Family				✓								1
Manhattanville			✓									1
Penn State Schuylkill				✓								1
St. Mary's								✓				1

==== Women's varsity sports not sponsored by the Atlantic East Conference that are played by Atlantic East schools ====
School	Equestrian (Note: Although equestrianism in NCAA Divisions I and II is included in the NCAA Emerging Sports for Women program, D-III equestrian is still outside that program.)	Esports (Note: Non NCAA)	Golf	Track & field (indoor)	Wrestling (Note: Single Division)
Centenary	IHSA (Note: Centenary's equestrian program is governed by the Intercollegiate Horse Show Association.)	✗	✗	✗	IND
Gwynedd Mercy	✗	✗	✗	United East	✗
Immaculata	✗	✓	✗	United East	✗
Marymount	✗	✗	Centennial	United East	IND
Pratt	IHSA (Note: Pratt's equestrian program is governed by the Intercollegiate Horse Show Association.)	✗	✗	United East	✗
