= Centenary University =

University in Hackettstown, New Jersey, US

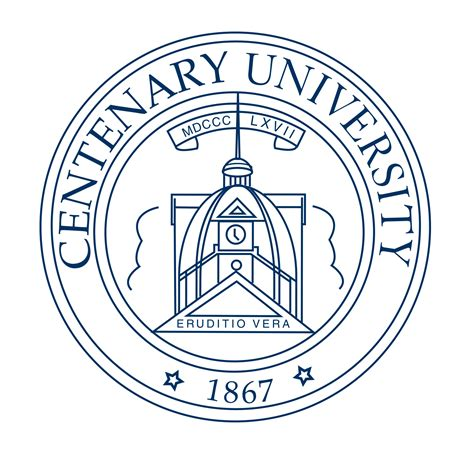
- Former names: Centenary Collegiate Institute (1867–1940); Centenary Junior College (1940–1956); Centenary College for Women (1956–1976); Centenary College (1976–2016)
- Motto: Eruditio Vera
- Motto in English: True Learning
- Type: Private university
- Established: March 6, 1867; 159 years ago
- Founder: Jonathan Townley Crane
- Accreditation: Middle States Commission on Higher Education
- Religious affiliation: United Methodist Church
- Endowment: $14.4 million (2022)
- President: John R. Schol
- Faculty: 62 full-time and 150 part-time
- Undergraduates: 936
- Postgraduates: 462
- Location: Hackettstown, New Jersey, United States; 40.8492313°N 74.8326123°W
- Campus: 41 acres (Main Campus), 36 acres (Equestrian Center); Suburban
- Colors: Centenary blue, gold, and white
- Nickname: Cyclones
- Sporting affiliations: NCAA Division III – Atlantic East
- Mascot: Sid the Cyclone
- Website: centenaryuniversity.edu
- Centenary Collegiate Institute
- U.S. National Register of Historic Places
- New Jersey Register of Historic Places
- Location within Warren County, New Jersey Location within New Jersey Location within the United States
- Coordinates: 40°50′57″N 74°49′57″W
- Area: 4.3 acres (1.7 ha)
- NRHP reference No.: 97000564
- NJRHP No.: 3496

Significant dates
- Added to NRHP: June 13, 1997
- Designated NJRHP: April 21, 1997

Centenary University is a private university in Hackettstown, New Jersey, United States. Founded as a preparatory school by the Newark Conference of the Methodist Episcopal Church in 1867, Centenary evolved into a junior college for women and later a coeducational university.

Situated in suburban Warren County, New Jersey, 52 miles (84 km) west of New York City, 35 miles (56 km) southeast of the Delaware Water Gap National Recreation Area, and 26 miles (42 km) northeast of Easton, Pennsylvania, the school's main campus is identifiable by the Edward W. Seay Administration Building, listed on the National Register of Historic Places.

== History ==
Centenary University was founded as the Centenary Collegiate Institute (CCI) by the Newark Conference of what was then called the Methodist Episcopal Church in 1867. The name was chosen to commemorate the centennial of Methodism in the United States. It was built for $200,000. George H. Whitney, D.D., was president from 1869 to 1895. The first commencement ceremony was held on June 25, 1875.

Beginning as a coeducational preparatory school, CCI became a girls-only institution in 1910. In 1940, it became a junior college: Centenary Junior College, which operated alongside the original preparatory school. The preparatory school and junior college would subsequently become Centenary College for Women in 1956 before becoming Centenary College in 1976, a four-year college for women offering associate and bachelor's degrees, with men allowed to pursue degrees only during night courses. In 1988, men were allowed to attend full-time. In 1995, master's degree programs were introduced and in 2016, Centenary College was granted University status by the New Jersey Secretary of Higher Education.

In 1886, a 19-year-old kitchen worker at CCI named Tillie Smith was "outraged" and murdered in a field just off campus. A janitor at CCI named James Titus was convicted of the crime based on circumstantial evidence strongly influenced by yellow journalism. Authors and historians generally consider this a false conviction, but the debate over the facts continues perennially through dark tourism ghost tours, theatrical performances, books and Weird NJ magazine articles.

On Halloween night, 1899, the original five-story CCI building burned to the ground in a fire. The new building, affectionately called "Old Main" (now known as the Seay Building), was designed by architect Oscar Schutte Teale in a Renaissance Beaux Arts style and built atop the ruins of the original structure in 1901. Only two buildings survived the fire, the men's gymnasium (now the Little Theater of the Seay Building) and the women's gymnasium (now the Ferry Building).

In 1957, a student-run college radio station, WNTI, began broadcasting on campus. Eventually becoming an NPR affiliate serving the regional community with an adult album rock format, the FM transmitter was sold to University of Pennsylvania-based WXPN in 2015. As of 2020, a student-run internet radio station operates at WNTI.org.

The Centenary Stage Company, a professional Equity theater, has been operating on campus since 1985. In 1992, a "Women's Playwright Series" development program offered grants, workshops, prizes and world premieres for the underserved voice of women in theater. Centenary also offers an intensive musical theater program for intermediate and advanced young performers.

== Accreditation ==
Centenary University is accredited by the Middle States Commission on Higher Education and approved by the University Senate of the United Methodist Church. Some programs at Centenary are accredited by the International Assembly for Collegiate Business Education, Council for the Accreditation of Educator Preparation, Council on Social Work Education, or International Assembly for Collegiate Business Education.

== Main campus and learning centers ==
The Centenary University Main campus is located in Hackettstown, New Jersey. The Centenary Equestrian Center in Washington Township provides riding and education facilities for its Department of Equine Studies and Animal Health.

=== Hackettstown Campus ===
The main campus of Centenary University is home to most of the school's academic, administrative, athletic and collegiate activities, as well as housing for its undergraduate students. It consists of ten main buildings and eight residence buildings. The Edward W. Seay Building was added to the National Register of Historic Places on June 13, 1997, for its significance in architecture.

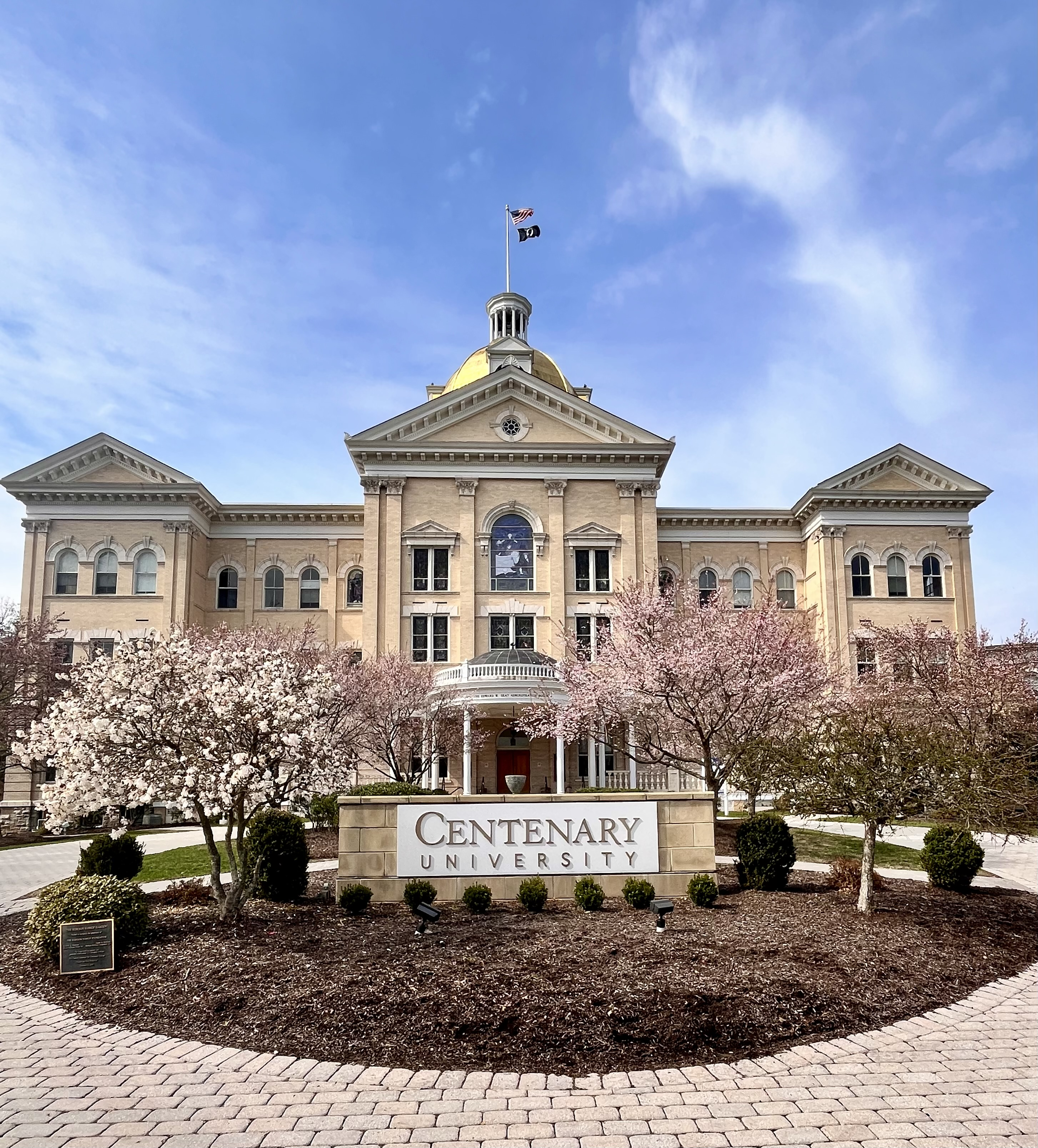
The Edward W. Seay Administration Building serves as the university's flagship building with its main offices, classrooms, the Student Activity Center, and a Starbucks cafe.

In addition to its own residence halls, Centenary has an agreement with Sussex County Community College, where some Sussex athletes and students have the option to live on Centenary's campus. Sussex students may only live in the traditional dormitories and not the apartment-style buildings or freshmen dorms for Centenary Students. Additionally, Centenary has leased out Smith Hall, traditionally reserved for freshmen and transfer students, to be used as housing for local boarding high school programs.

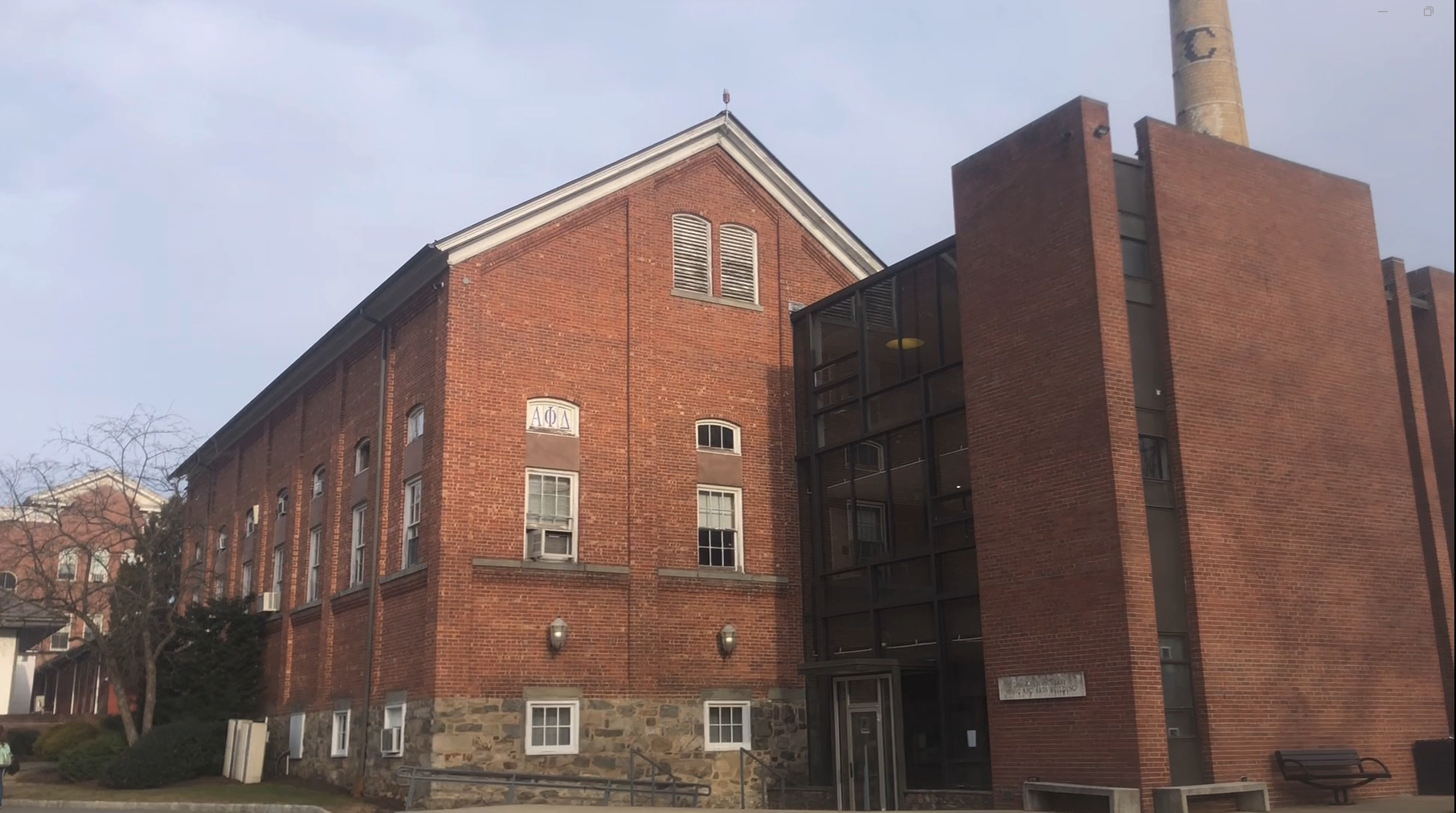
The Ferry Music and Arts Building. The old section of the building is one of the two oldest structures on campus, surviving the fire of 1899.

=== Equestrian Center ===
The Equestrian Center is located in Washington Township, Morris County. It consists of several large paddocks, an outdoor eventing course, two indoor arenas and an outdoor arena. The United States Equestrian Team (USET) building is the main building of the Equestrian Center with its main offices, classrooms, a lounge, dining services, and the large indoor arena. The Equestrian Center sits on 65 acres (260,000 m^{2}) of land.

In 2007 and 2012, Centenary Equestrian Center hosted the American National Riding Commission Championships, the Intercollegiate Horse Show Association Zone Finals, and the Intercollegiate Dressage Association Championships.

== Athletics ==
Centenary University teams participate in fourteen NCAA Division III intercollegiate sports. The Cyclones compete in the Atlantic East Conference, joining in the 2021-22 season, becoming the first non-Catholic member institution. The Cyclones previously competed in the Colonial States Athletic Conference, joining in the 2007–08 season after being a member of the Skyline Conference. Men's sports include baseball, basketball, cross country, equestrian, lacrosse, soccer and wrestling; while women's sports include basketball, cross country, equestrian, flag football, lacrosse, soccer, softball and volleyball. Women's wrestling is also offered as a club sport. Students enrolled in the college's Equine programs may participate in competitions through intercollegiate organizations such as the Intercollegiate Horse Show Association, the Intercollegiate Dressage Association, or with the Hunter/Jumper's Club.

The Athletic Department is headquartered at the John M. Reeves Student Recreation Center, which offers a 1,200 seat arena, a weight room, wrestling room, locker rooms, and a natatorium (currently not in use). In 2019, Our Diamond of Dreams was opened as the fully-synthetic turf home field of the Cyclone baseball team. It also serves as the home field of the Hackettstown High School baseball team. The soccer and lacrosse teams compete on the Reeves turf field, which is also fully-synthetic.

=== Noted athletic achievements ===
In 2009 Centenary's Intercollegiate Horse Show Association team won the National Championships in Murfreesboro, Tennessee. Lindsay Clark, a Centenary Student, also won the USEF/Cacchione Cup.

The 2010 women's soccer team won the CSAC Championship, earning them an automatic bid to the NCAA Tournament. The 2013 and 2016 men's soccer teams replicated this feat.

== Notable alumni and staff ==
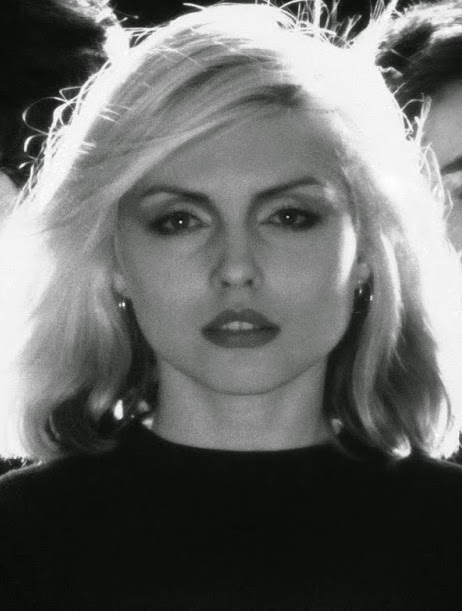
Debbie Harry, class of 1965

- Dale G. Caldwell (born 1960), 15th university president from 2023 to 2025 and Lieutenant Governor of New Jersey from January to September 2026.
- Bette Cooper (1920–2017), Miss America 1937
- Jonathan Townley Crane (1819–1880), clergyman, author, abolitionist, and co-founder of Centenary Collegiate Institute (now Centenary University)
- William Howe Crane (1854–1926), lawyer
- Brian Philip Davis (born 1981), film editor from Northern Ireland
- Mike Hall (born 1989), bassist
- Debbie Harry (born 1945), lead singer of Blondie
- Cole Kimball (born 1985), pitcher who played for the Washington Nationals
- Carol McCain (born 1937), former wife of U.S. Senator and former 2008 Republican Presidential Candidate John McCain
- Gail Phoebus (born 1950), politician who has represented the 24th Legislative District in the New Jersey General Assembly from 2015 to 2018
