= Lancaster Bible College =

Private college in Lancaster, Pennsylvania, U.S.

- Former names: Lancaster School of the Bible (1933–1973), Lancaster Bible College & Graduate School (1996–2016); Lancaster Bible College | Capital Seminary & Graduate School (2016-2024)
- Type: Private Bible college
- Established: 1933
- Accreditation: MSCHE
- Religious affiliation: Non-denominational
- Academic affiliations: ABHE
- President: Thomas L. Kiedis
- Provost: Julia Hershey (Interim Provost)
- Faculty: 49 full-time, 8 part-time
- Administrative staff: 142 full-time, 30 part-time (fall 2025)
- Students: 2,455 (fall 2023)
- Undergraduates: 1,778 (fall 2023)
- Postgraduates: 677
- Location: Lancaster, Pennsylvania, United States; 40°4′30″N 76°17′17″W
- Campus: Suburban, 109 acres (.45 km^{2})
- Hymn: "My Hope Is in the Lord"
- Colors: (Red and black)
- Nickname: Chargers
- Sporting affiliations: NCAA Division III, NCCAA; United East
- Website: lbc.edu
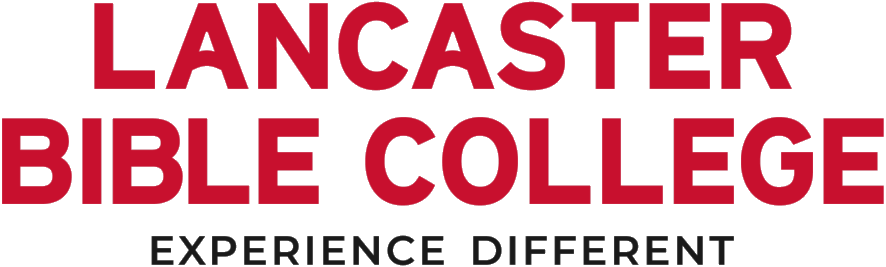

Lancaster Bible College is a private Bible college, seminary, and graduate school in Lancaster, Pennsylvania.

Lancaster Bible College offers non-credit courses, undergraduate, master's, and doctoral degree programs. The college offers several Master of Arts and Master of Education degree programs, along with three Doctorate programs.

== History ==
Founded in 1933 by Henry J. Heydt, the original name of the school was Lancaster School of the Bible. In 1957, the college made the move to its current location in Manheim Township, Lancaster County, Pennsylvania. In 1973, the school took on its current name, and in 1981 the Pennsylvania Department of Education gave LBC official approval to offer the Bachelor of Science in Bible degree.

In 1994, LBC's graduate school was approved to award Master of Arts in Bible, Ministry, Counseling, and Master of Education degrees in School Counseling and Consulting Resource Teacher.

In July 2012, LBC announced the launching of a Philadelphia site through its partnership with the Center for Urban Theological Studies (CUTS). The location ceased operations on August 24, 2025, and the location's offerings have since been folded into the college's online programming.

LBC was granted an exception to Title IX in 2016 which allows it to legally discriminate against LGBT students for religious reasons.

LBC's current president is Thomas L. Kiedis. He was preceded by Peter W. Teague (1999–2020), Gilbert A. Peterson (1979–1999), Stuart E. Lease (1961–1979), William J. Randolph (1953–1961), and Henry J. Heydt (1933–1953). Teague announced his retirement on August 21, 2018, and Kiedis became president effective February 1, 2020.

== Campus locations ==
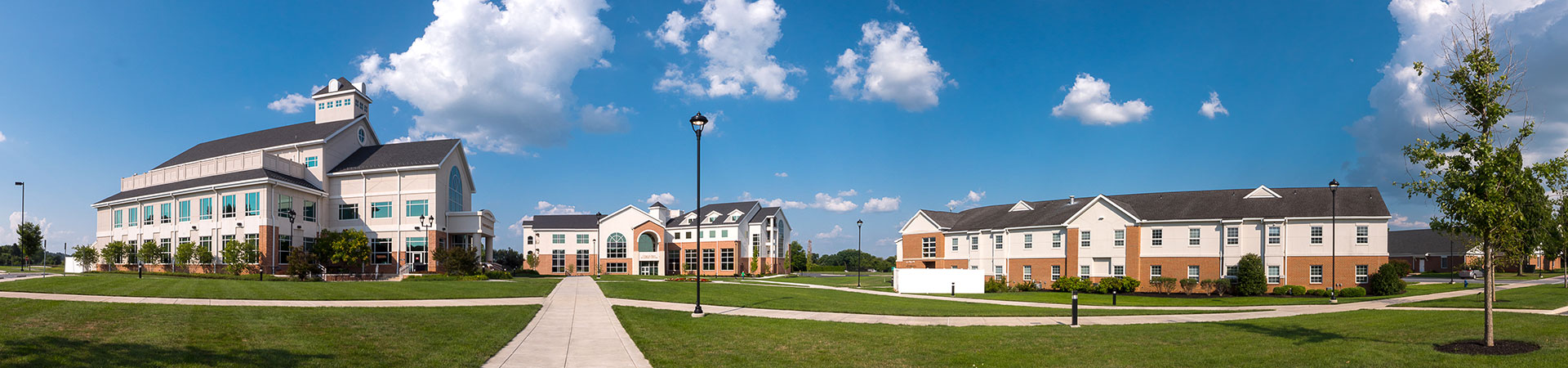
Panoramic shot of Teague Learning Commons, Charles Frey Academic Center, and Peterson Dormitory

The campus of Lancaster Bible College is situated on 109 acres in Manheim Township, Lancaster County. The campus is just north of Lancaster, Pennsylvania, and is within driving distance of Philadelphia, New York City, Baltimore, and Washington, D.C.

== Academics ==
Academic rankings

Master's
- Washington Monthly: 351 of 604

Regional
- U.S. News & World Report: 130 (tie) of 152

Lancaster Bible College is classified by The Carnegie Foundation for the Advancement of Teaching as a bible college with a high-undergraduate enrollment profile.

Students on average receive about $3,000 in financial aid from the college. Reduced tuition for one class per semester is offered to junior and senior high school students.

=== Undergraduate education ===
LBC's undergraduate education grants six bachelor's degrees, two associate degrees, and two one-year certificates. Over 170 faculty (part-time and full-time) teach at the college, many of whom have doctorates. Undergraduate students can select from 32 undergraduate majors (and 22 minors).

=== Graduate education ===
The institution's graduate education grants ten master's degrees and seven graduate certificates.

=== Doctorate programs ===
Lancaster currently offers four doctorate programs in Leadership (PhD), Biblical Studies (PhD), Educational Leadership (EdD) and Strategic Leadership (DMin).

=== Accreditation ===
Lancaster Bible College is accredited by the Middle States Commission on Higher Education (MSCHE) and the Association for Biblical Higher Education on Accreditation (ABHE). LBC is also accredited by the Council on Social Work Education (CSWE), the National Association of Schools of Music (NASM), and by the Commission on Sport Management Accreditation (COMSA). The school is registered with the Pennsylvania Department of Education.

== Student life ==
It is a tradition for students to receive a towel along with their diploma as they graduate, as a symbol of foot washing and a reminder to use their education to serve others.

== Trust Performing Arts Center ==
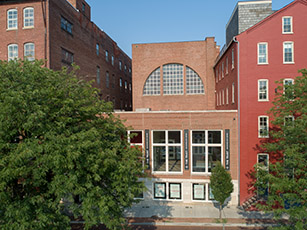
Facade of the Trust Performing Arts Center

Lancaster Bible College runs The Trust Performing Arts Center in downtown Lancaster, Pennsylvania. Built in 1912 for the Lancaster Trust Company, the building features Beaux-Arts design from esteemed Lancaster architect C. Emlen Urban.

The Trust hosts live theater, music, dance, and lectures throughout the year.

== Athletics ==
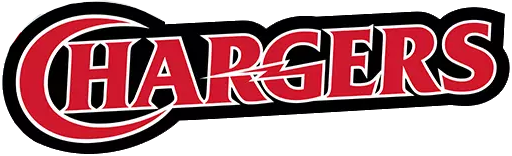
Lancaster Bible athletics wordmark

Lancaster Bible College teams (which are only at the college's Lancaster campus) participate as a member of the National Christian College Athletic Association (NCCAA) Division I and the National Collegiate Athletic Association (NCAA) Division III. The Chargers are a member of the NCAA's United East Conference. Men's sports include baseball, basketball, cross country, golf, soccer, tennis, track & field and volleyball; women's sports include basketball, cross country, field hockey, golf, soccer, softball, tennis, track & field, and volleyball.

Women's beach volleyball was added as a club sport during the 2023-2024 academic Year.

=== Athletic awards ===
- NEAC Presidents' Cup (2017, 2018, 2019)
- United East Conference Men's Basketball Champions (Formerly the North Eastern Athletic Conference) (2016, 2018, 2023)
