= Gwynedd Mercy University =

Catholic university in Lower Gwynedd Township, Pennsylvania, US

- Former name: Gwynedd Mercy College (1948–2013)
- Motto: Veritas et Misericordia
- Motto in English: Truth and Mercy
- Type: Private university
- Established: 1948; 78 years ago
- Religious affiliation: Roman Catholic
- Academic affiliations: CMHE; ACCU; MSA; NAICU; CIC
- President: Deanne D'Emilio
- Academic staff: 81 full-time, 196 part-time
- Students: 2,017 (fall 2024)
- Undergraduates: 1,301 (fall 2024)
- Postgraduates: 716 (fall 2024)
- Location: Gwynedd Valley, Pennsylvania, U.S. 40.198°N 75.236°W
- Campus: Suburban, 314 acres (127 ha)
- Colors: Red and gold
- Nickname: Griffins
- Sporting affiliations: NCAA Division III – Atlantic East
- Mascot: M.E.R.V
- Website: gmercyu.edu
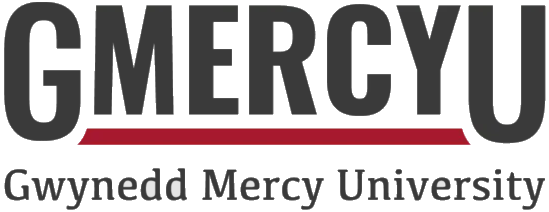

Gwynedd Mercy University (GMercyU) is a private Catholic university in Lower Gwynedd Township, Pennsylvania, United States. It occupies a 160-acre (65-hectare) campus in the Archdiocese of Philadelphia.

The Sisters of Mercy founded the institution as a junior college in 1948 with the name Gwynedd-Mercy College. In 1963, the college was rechartered as a baccalaureate institution. The school later renamed itself Gwynedd Mercy University. GMercyU offers more than 40 undergraduate and graduate degrees in nursing, education, business, and the arts & sciences.

== History ==
Dating to the early 1900s, the grounds were originally owned by Frances Bond, an investment banker, and were known as Willowbrook Farm. The farm hosted a large Gregorian mansion, formal gardens and outbuildings that were designed by Philadelphia architect Horace Trumbauer, the architect of the Philadelphia Museum of Art. The mansion is over one hundred years old and was the home of the Bonds; it is still in use by the university today as Assumption Hall.

Frances Bond's wife Margaret died in 1910, a few years after the Gregorian Mansion was finished in 1906–1907. Two years after her death, Bond sold Willowbrook Farm to Roland and Anita Taylor. The couple renamed the farm Treweryn, after the creek that flows through the property. Mr. Taylor was an enthusiastic landscaper who planted many ornamental trees and shrubs, including 53 varieties of Rhododendron. After the death of the Taylors, their daughters sold the mansion, outbuildings and additional land to the Sisters of Mercy in 1948.

== Academics ==
Espousing the ideals of a liberal education, the university offers baccalaureate and associate degrees in more than 40 programs. The university also offers master's degrees, post-masters certificates, and doctorate-level degrees. Gwynedd Mercy University is accredited by the Middle States Commission on Higher Education.

== Facilities ==
- Keiss Library and Academic Resource Center.
- The Lincoln Library in Assumption Hall contains a large adjunct collection of books on Abraham Lincoln and the American Civil War.
- Julia Ball Auditorium, a small-in-the-round theater.
- Frances M. Maguire Hall is home to the Frances M. Maguire School of Nursing and Health Professions, natural science, and math and computational science.
- University Hall houses the Schools of Business and Education.
- Four residential halls, Alexandria (built in January 2006), Siena, St. Brigid and Loyola, provide on-campus housing to students.

== Athletics ==
Gwynedd Mercy is a member of the National Collegiate Athletic Association and Atlantic East Conference (AEC) with 19 sports teams that compete at NCAA Division III level. In the spring of 2009, Gwynedd Mercy opened its doors to a new turf athletic multi-purpose stadium and the addition of Men's Lacrosse to their athletic department. The Griffins most successful athletic program is Women's Basketball, which captured the CSAC championships in 2000, 2001, 2003, 2006, 2007 and 2012. Men's Basketball captured the title in 1999, 2004, 2005, 2009 and 2016. The Gwynedd Mercy Women's Soccer team won their only title in 2001. The Griffin Baseball team has had back-to-back championship seasons in 2000 and 2001, then again in 2007 and 2008. Men's Cross-Country team has won four consecutive league championships from 2008 to 2011. The Women Griffins ran to a title in 2009 in Cross-Country. The Women's Tennis team has gone on to win four consecutive league championships from 2009 to 2012. The field hockey team has won the past four CSAC championships, in 2011, 2012, 2013, and 2014.

The 160-acre (65-hectare) campus has outdoor tennis courts, outdoor basketball courts, and playing fields for softball, lacrosse, baseball, soccer and field hockey. The Griffin Complex, the university's multimillion-dollar sports facility, contains a full-size collegiate basketball court; an indoor track; an aerobics room; racquetball, volleyball and wallyball courts; a weight room.

== Student life ==
The Voices of Gwynedd is a choir composed of full- and part-time students, faculty, staff, alumni and friends of Gwynedd Mercy University.

== Special programs and services ==
=== Valie Genuardi Hobbit House ===
The Valie Genuardi Hobbit House is a child development nursery school (ages 3–5) where the age groups work and play together in a family atmosphere. Located in the college's Trocaire building, the Hobbit House preschool extends hands-on experience to early childhood development and nursing majors currently enrolled at the college. Fulfilling its mission to raise a child's awareness of his/her surrounding natural environment, the Hobbit House opens all field trips and special occasions to Gwynedd-Mercy students and parents who wish to attend. As of October 19, 2012, the Valie Genuardi Hobbit House was licensed by the Pennsylvania State Board of Private Academic Schools.

=== Upward Bound ===
A comprehensive, pre-college preparatory program designed to aid high school students interested in higher education, Gwynedd-Mercy offers eligible, Diocesan-city-schooled participants a five-week, summer residential stay on-campus. Program offerings include academic instruction in mathematics, science and English; tutorial and counseling services; PSAT/SAT workshops; financial aid information; visits to colleges; and cultural and social activities.

== See also ==
- Gwynedd Mercy Academy High School
