= Neumann University =

Catholic college in Aston, Pennsylvania, US

Coordinates: 39.8756°N 75.4403°W

- Former names: Our Lady of Angels College (1965–1980); Neumann College (1980–2009)
- Motto: Veritas, Caritas (Latin)
- Motto in English: "Truth, Charity"
- Type: Private university
- Established: 1965; 61 years ago
- Founder: Sisters of St. Francis of Philadelphia
- Accreditation: MSCHE
- Religious affiliation: Roman Catholic (Franciscan)
- Academic affiliations: ACCU; AFCU; CIC; NAICU
- Endowment: $28 million (2016)
- President: Chris E. Domes
- Students: 2,244 (Fall 2024)
- Undergraduates: 1,658
- Postgraduates: 586
- Location: Aston, Pennsylvania, United States
- Campus: 133 acres (54 ha); Large suburb
- Newspaper: NeuPress
- Colors: Navy, gold and white
- Nickname: Knights
- Sporting affiliations: NCAA Division III Atlantic East; ECAC
- Mascot: Knight
- Website: neumann.edu

Neumann University is a private Catholic university in Aston, Pennsylvania, United States. It is sponsored by the Sisters of St. Francis of Philadelphia.

== History ==
The roots of Neumann University began in 1855 when Bishop (later Saint) John Neumann approved the request of Anna Maria Boll Bachmann to start a religious community of Franciscan Sisters in Philadelphia, Pennsylvania. Over the course of the next century, the Sisters of St. Francis of Philadelphia grew to the point where they needed a college to assist in their mission of educating and caring for the people in southeastern Pennsylvania and beyond. Neumann University was founded as Our Lady of Angels College with 115 female students in 1965 by the Sisters of St. Francis of Philadelphia. The name was changed to Neumann College in 1980 in honor of Saint John Neumann, a former Bishop of Philadelphia.

Neumann admitted its first male undergraduate students in 1980. The college was granted approval to offer its first doctoral program (the Doctorate in Physical Therapy) in 2004 and its second doctoral program (an Ed.D. in educational leadership) in 2005. Neumann achieved university status from the Pennsylvania Department of Education in 2009, thus becoming Neumann University.

On June 30, 2021, Chris Everett Domes, Neumann's president, and Mary Kathryn Dougherty, congregational minister of the Sisters of St. Francis of Philadelphia, signed an agreement of sale for the university to purchase Our Lady of Angels Convent, three smaller buildings, and 63 acres from the sisters, the congregation that founded the university in 1965. The land is adjacent to the university's campus, which almost doubled in size (from 70 acres to 133) with the sale.

== Academics ==
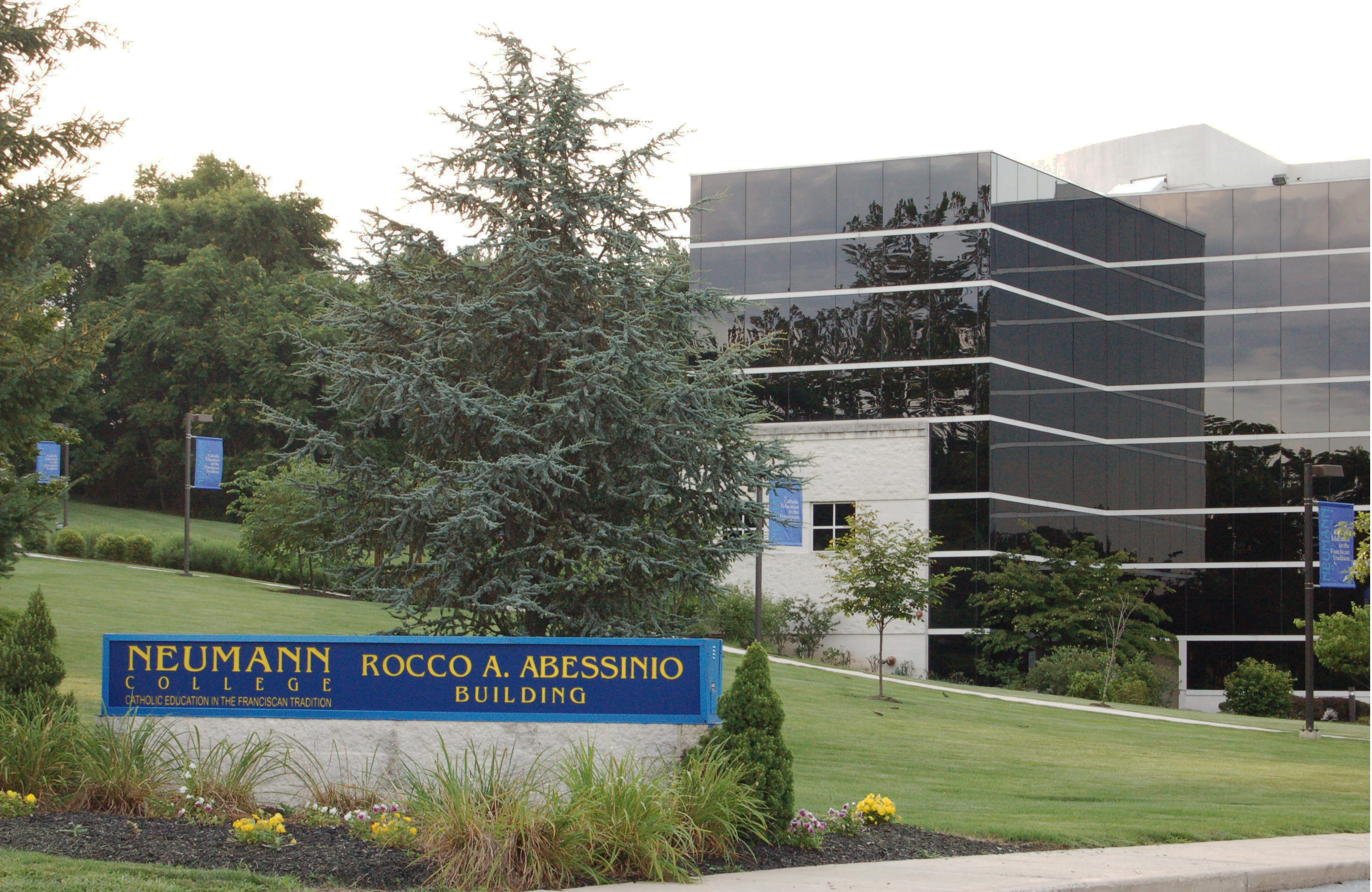
The Rocco A. Abessinio Building

Neumann University is made up of three academic schools: the School of Business, the School of Nursing and Health Sciences, and the School of Social Sciences, Humanities, and Education. Neumann offers graduate degrees in education, educational leadership, physical therapy, clinical mental health counseling, accounting, nursing, business, sport business, athletic training, organizational leadership, and clinical laboratory science. Some programs are offered online.

Neumann University has been expanding into the health care field by introducing new concentrations such as pre-Physical Therapy, pre-Occupational Therapy, pre-Athletic Training as well as introducing a new Health Sciences Major with tracks in exercise physiology and strength and conditioning. All of these new concentrations are housed in Neumann's Health Science Center. In 2017, about 49% of undergraduate students were white, 31% were black, and 9% were Hispanic. About 65% of undergraduate students at the university were female. As of fall 2017, about 60% of undergraduates were from Pennsylvania, 16% were from New Jersey, and 18% were from Delaware.

== Athletics ==
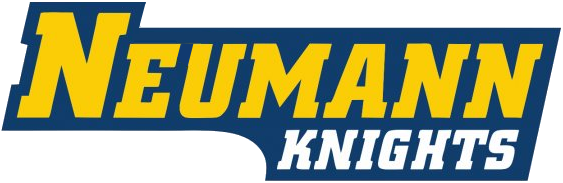
Neumann Knights wordmark

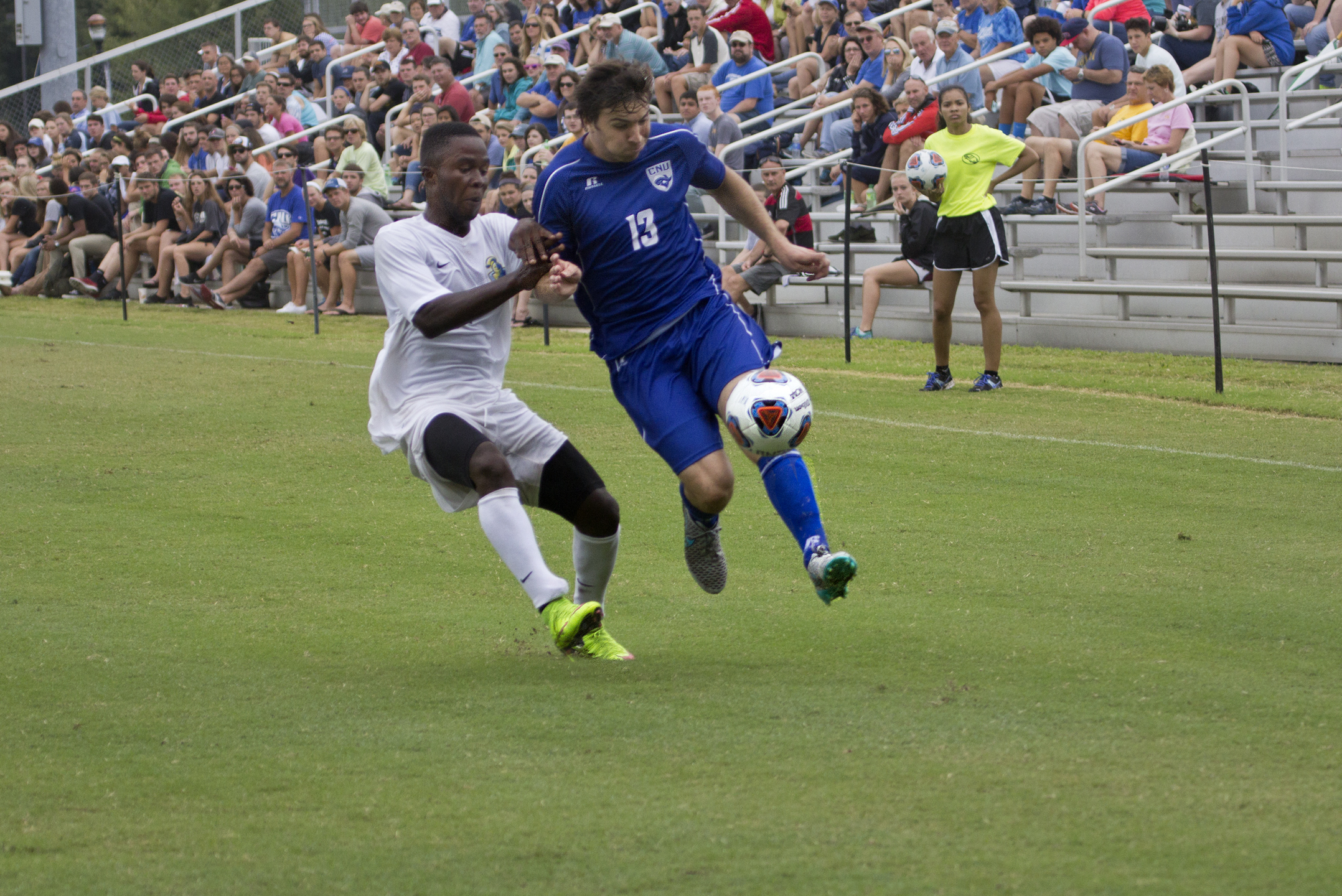
Neumann Knights men's soccer game vs Christopher Newport

Neumann University is a member of the Atlantic East Conference as well as the United Collegiate Hockey Conference (UCHC). It competes in the National Collegiate Athletic Association (NCAA) Division III. In 2009, Neumann University's men's ice hockey team won the NCAA Division III National Championship. In the summer of 2012, Neumann University constructed the Mirenda Center, a 72,000 square foot athletic complex which houses an indoor track, NCAA Division III regulation basketball court, dance studios, student lounges, a classroom, weight and cardio rooms as well as the Center for Sport Spirituality and Character Development.

Neumann sponsors 13 women's athletic teams and 10 men's teams. In addition to the 23 varsity teams, Neumann University also has a very active club sports roster which includes baseball, basketball, cheerleading, a dance team, ice hockey, roller hockey as well as men's and women's rugby. Most recently, Neumann University has won four national championships, including back-to-back Division 1 titles in 2015 and 2016, as part of the National Collegiate Roller Hockey Association (NCHRA).

== Campus ==
At Neumann University, there are four residence halls: three on-campus "Living and Learning Centers" plus one nearby apartment complex leased for student housing known as the Buoni Building. Students are also housed in a nearby convent alongside religious sisters.
