= List of Phi Eta Sigma chapters =

Phi Eta Sigma is an American freshman honor society that was founded at the University of Illinois in 1923. Following are the chapters of Phi Eta Sigma, with inactive institutions indicated in italics.

Institution	Charter date and range	Location	Status	Ref.
University of Illinois Urbana-Champaign	March 22, 1923	Urbana, Illinois	Active	
University of Missouri	1926–2003	Columbia, Missouri	Inactive	
University of Michigan	1926–1978	Ann Arbor, Michigan	Inactive	
University of Oklahoma	1927–1993	Norman, Oklahoma	Inactive	
University of Wisconsin–Madison	1927–2010	Madison, Wisconsin	Inactive	
Miami University	1928–2005	Oxford, Ohio	Inactive	
Ohio State University	May 5, 1928 – 20xx ?	Columbus, Ohio	Inactive	(Note: Phi Eta Sigma at this institution is coupled with Alpha Lambda Delta.)
George Washington University	April 10, 1929 – 2012	Washington, D.C.	Inactive	
DePauw University	April 19, 1929 – 2017	Greencastle, Indiana	Inactive	
Catholic University of America	June 1, 1929	Washington, D.C.	Active	
Lake Forest College	1929–1968	Lake Forest, Illinois	Inactive	
Pennsylvania State University	November 25, 1929	State College, Pennsylvania	Active	
University of Mississippi	January 3, 1930	University, Mississippi	Active	
University of Alabama	January 6, 1930	Tuscaloosa, Alabama	Active	
Georgia Tech	1930–2007	Atlanta, Georgia	Inactive	
University of Florida	January 11, 1930	Gainesville, Florida	Active	
Montana State University	1930–1981	Bozeman, Montana	Inactive	
Lehigh University	May 15, 1930 – 2016	Ithaca, New York	Inactive	
North Carolina State University	May 16, 1930 – 20xx ?	Raleigh, North Carolina	Inactive	
University of Tennessee	May 17, 1930	Knoxville, Tennessee	Active	
Indiana University Bloomington	May 19, 1930	Bloomington, Indiana	Active	
University of South Dakota	1930–2013	Vermillion, South Dakota	Inactive	
University of North Dakota	May 23, 1930 – 20xx ?	Grand Forks, North Dakota	Inactive	
University of Arkansas	1931–1994	Fayetteville, Arkansas	Inactive	
Southern Methodist University	1931–1990	Dallas, Texas	Inactive	
University of Texas at Austin	February 17, 1931	Austin, Texas	Active	
Oklahoma State University	February 19, 1931 – 20xx ?	Stillwater, Oklahoma	Inactive	
Washington University in St. Louis	1931–1974	St. Louis, Missouri	Inactive	
Butler University	May 7, 1931	Indianapolis, Indiana	Active	
Northwestern University	1932–1997	Evanston, Illinois	Inactive	
Mercer University	March 26, 1932	Macon, Georgia	Active	
Duke University	1932–2005	Durham, North Carolina	Inactive	
Louisiana State University	May 22, 1932	Baton Rouge, Louisiana	Active	
University of Cincinnati	1933–1976	Cincinnati, Ohio	Inactive	
University of Idaho	November 9, 1934	Moscow, Idaho	Active	
Mississippi State University	1935–2005	Starkville, Mississippi	Inactive	
Ohio University	1936–1990	Athens, Ohio	Inactive	
University of Southern California	1936–1974	Los Angeles, California	Inactive	
University of California, Los Angeles	November 10, 1936	Los Angeles, California	Active	
Washington and Lee University	May 2, 1937	Lexington, Virginia	Active	
University of Pittsburgh	May 13, 1937	Pittsburgh, Pennsylvania	Active	
University of Georgia	1938–2008	Athens, Georgia	Inactive	
Wittenberg University	April 3, 1938	Springfield, Ohio	Active	
Bucknell University	1939–2003	Lewisburg, Pennsylvania	Inactive	
University of Utah	June 2, 1939 – 20xx ?	Salt Lake City, Utah	Inactive	
University of Maryland, College Park	March 7, 1940 – 20xx ?	College Park, Maryland	Inactive	
Clemson University	1940–1992	Clemson, South Carolina	Inactive	
University of Akron	1940–2011	Akron, Ohio	Inactive	
University of Iowa	May 5, 1945	Iowa City, Iowa	Active	
Texas Tech University	May 18, 1946	Lubbock, Texas	Active	
University of Kentucky	December 5, 1946 – 2015	Lexington, Kentucky	Inactive	
University of California, Berkeley	1947–1962	Berkeley, California	Inactive	
Brigham Young University	May 21, 1947 – 20xx ?	Provo, Utah	Inactive	
University of North Carolina at Chapel Hill	1947–1995	Chapel Hill, North Carolina	Inactive	
Iowa State University	June 4, 1947 – 20xx ?	Ames, Iowa	Inactive	
Willamette University	1947–2006	Salem, Oregon	Inactive	
University of Tennessee at Chattanooga	November 22, 1947	Chattanooga, Tennessee	Active	
Marshall University	1948–2010	Huntington, West Virginia	Inactive	
University of Nebraska Omaha	1948–2011	Omaha, Nebraska	Inactive	
Beloit College	1948–1970	Beloit, Wisconsin	Inactive	
Washington State University Tri-Cities	April 21, 1948 – 20xx ?	Richland, Washington	Inactive	
University of Tulsa	May 29, 1948	Tulsa, Oklahoma	Active	
Purdue University	November 9, 1948	West Lafayette, Indiana	Active	
San Jose State University	1948–1974	San Jose, California	Inactive	
Illinois Institute of Technology	1948–1994	Chicago, Illinois	Inactive	
Texas A&M University	January 5, 1949	College Station, Texas	Active	
Albion College	1949–1988	Albion, Michigan	Inactive	
Doane College	1949–2010	Crete, Nebraska	Inactive	
University of Oregon	1949–2004	Eugene, Oregon	Inactive	
Oregon State University	1949–2004	Corvallis, Oregon	Inactive	
Northern Arizona University	1950–2004	Flagstaff, Arizona	Inactive	(Note: Chapter formed at Arizona State College at Flagstaff, now called Northern Arizona University.)
University of Miami	1950–1994	Coral Gables, Florida	Inactive	
Vanderbilt University	December 8, 1950 – 20xx ?	Nashville, Tennessee	Inactive	
Auburn University	1950	Auburn, Alabama	Active	
University of Southern Mississippi	December 11, 1950	Hattiesburg, Mississippi	Active	
Drury University	1951–1990	Springfield, Missouri	Inactive	
Bradley University	1951–2006	Peoria, Illinois	Inactive	
Arizona State University	May 3, 1952 – 20xx ?	Tempe, Arizona	Inactive	
New Jersey Institute of Technology	May 7, 1952	Newark, New Jersey	Active	(Note: Chapter formed at the Newark College of Engineering, now called New Jersey Institute of Technology.)
University of North Texas	1953–2003	Denton, Texas	Inactive	
Michigan State University	1954–1976	East Lansing, Michigan	Inactive	
Bowling Green State University	May 1, 1954	Bowling Green, Ohio	Active	
Michigan Technological University	1954–1991	Houghton, Michigan	Inactive	(Note: Chapter formed at the Michigan College of Mining and Technology, now called Michigan Technological University.)
Southern Illinois University Carbondale	1954–1993	Carbondale, Illinois	Inactive	
Tulane University	December 10, 1954 – 2016	New Orleans, Louisiana	Inactive	
University of Massachusetts Amherst	1955–1981	Amherst, Massachusetts	Inactive	
Florida State University	May 13, 1955	Tallahassee, Florida	Active	
San Diego State University	December 16, 1955 – 20xx ?	San Diego, California	Inactive	
Georgia State University	1956–1994	Atlanta, Georgia	Inactive	
Birmingham–Southern College	1956–2012	Birmingham, Alabama	Inactive	
Kansas State University	February 20, 1957	Manhattan, Kansas	Active	
Drake University	1957–1992	Des Moines, Iowa	Inactive	
Hanover College	1957–2003	Hanover, Indiana	Inactive	
Kent State University	1957–1974	Kent, Ohio	Inactive	
Oklahoma Baptist University	December 20, 1958	Shawnee, Oklahoma	Active	
Fort Hays State University	1958–2010	Hays, Kansas	Inactive	
University of Washington	1959–19xx ?, 1991–2015	Seattle, Washington	Inactive	
University of Arizona	October 23, 1959 – 2017	Tucson, Arizona	Inactive	
University at Buffalo	December 11, 1959	Buffalo, New York	Active	
University of Louisville	December 12, 1959 – 2016	Louisville, Kentucky	Inactive	
East Texas A&M University	January 8, 1960	Commerce, Texas	Active	(Note: Chapter formed at Texas A&M University–Commerce, now East Texas A&M University.)
University of Nebraska–Lincoln	May 21, 1960	Lincoln, Nebraska	Active	
University of Wisconsin–Platteville	May 23, 1960	Platteville, Wisconsin	Active	
Arkansas State University	June 12, 1960 – 2018	Jonesboro, Arkansas	Inactive	
University of Wisconsin–Milwaukee	1960–2009	Milwaukee, Wisconsin	Inactive	
Saint Joseph's College	1960–1961	Philadelphia, Pennsylvania	Inactive	
University of Toledo	January 4, 1961	Toledo, Ohio	Active	
Saint Michael's College	1961–1970	Colchester, Vermont		
Utah State University	1961–1976	Logan, Utah	Inactive	
University of Louisiana at Lafayette	1961–2004	Lafayette, Louisiana	Inactive	(Note: Chapter formed at the University of Southwestern Louisiana, now called University of Louisiana at Lafayette.)
Cornell University	1961–1973	Ithaca, New York	Inactive	
Baylor University	1962–1984	Waco, Texas	Inactive	
DePaul University	1962–1986	Chicago, Illinois	Inactive	
Davidson College	1962–1986	Davidson, North Carolina	Inactive	
Texas Christian University	1962–1976	Fort Worth, Texas	Inactive	
Western Michigan University	1962–1995	Kalamazoo, Michigan	Inactive	
Temple University	1962–1974	Philadelphia, Pennsylvania	Inactive	
University of the Pacific	1963–1974	Stockton, California	Inactive	
Missouri University of Science and Technology	September 29, 1963	Rolla, Missouri	Active	
Northwestern State University	1963–2010	Natchitoches, Louisiana	Inactive	
Ferris State University	1964–1985	Big Rapids, Michigan	Inactive	
San Francisco State University	1964–1967	San Francisco, California	Inactive	
University of Detroit Mercy	1964–1980	Detroit, Michigan	Inactive	
University of Hawaiʻi at Mānoa	1964–1994	Honolulu, Hawaii	Inactive	
North Dakota State University	September 30, 1964	Fargo, North Dakota	Active	
College of William & Mary	April 8, 1965	Williamsburg, Virginia	Active	
New Mexico Highlands University	May 20, 1965	Las Vegas, New Mexico	Active	
Colorado State University	1965–2012	Fort Collins, Colorado	Inactive	
Illinois State University	1965–2007	Normal, Illinois	Inactive	
Kalamazoo College	1965–1978	Kalamazoo, Michigan	Inactive	
Spring Hill College	1965–1996, 20xx ?	Mobile, Alabama	Active	
Otterbein University	December 12, 1965	Westerville, Ohio	Active	
Anderson University	February 4, 1966	Anderson, Indiana	Active	
California State University, Long Beach	February 27, 1966 – 20xx ?	Long Beach, California	Inactive	
Ohio Northern University	May 22, 1966	Ada, Ohio	Active	
Northern Illinois University	1966–2009	DeKalb, Illinois	Inactive	
University of South Carolina	1966–2004	Columbia, South Carolina	Inactive	
University of Wisconsin–Oshkosh	1966–1974	Oshkosh, Wisconsin	Inactive	
Virginia Tech	1966–2006	Blacksburg, Virginia	Inactive	
University of Wisconsin–Eau Claire	October 6, 1966	Eau Claire, Wisconsin	Active	
Central Michigan University	December 9, 1966 – 20xx ?	Mount Pleasant, Michigan	Inactive	
Morningside University	April 16, 1967 – 20xx ?	Sioux City, Iowa	Inactive	
University of Illinois Chicago	April 17, 1967 – 20xx ?	Chicago, Illinois	Inactive	
California State University, Chico	April 23, 1967 – 20xx ?	Chico, California	Inactive	
Georgetown University	1967–1973	Washington, D.C.	Inactive	
Illinois Wesleyan University	1967–2010	Bloomington, Illinois	Inactive	
University of New Orleans	1967–2005	New Orleans, Louisiana	Inactive	
St. Ambrose University	December 11, 1967	Davenport, Iowa	Active	
Angelo State University	1968–1976	San Angelo, Texas	Inactive	
Lamar University	May 11, 1968– 2016	Beaumont, Texas	Inactive	
Carroll University	1969–1986	Waukesha, Wisconsin	Inactive	
University of Redlands	1969–1976	Redlands, California	Inactive	
Wichita State University	1969–2008	Wichita, Kansas	Inactive	
University of South Alabama	April 12, 1969	Mobile, Alabama	Active	
Drexel University	June 4, 1969 – 20xx ?	Philadelphia, Pennsylvania	Inactive	
Western Kentucky University	September 11, 1970	Bowling Green, Kentucky	Active	
Nicholls State University	May 14, 1971	Thibodaux, Louisiana	Active	
Carson–Newman University	1971–2004	Jefferson City, Tennessee	Inactive	
Coe College	1972–1992	Cedar Rapids, Iowa	Inactive	
Samford University	1972–1994	Homewood, Alabama	Inactive	
University of Central Missouri	1972–1995	Warrensburg, Missouri	Inactive	
University of Louisiana at Monroe	1972–2007	Monroe, Louisiana	Inactive	
Eastern New Mexico University	1973–1990	Portales, New Mexico	Inactive	
University of West Georgia	1973–1994	Carrollton, Georgia	Inactive	
Texas State University	March 30, 1973	San Marcos, Texas	Active	
University of North Alabama	April 21, 1973 – 20xx ?	Florence, Alabama	Inactive	
Western Illinois University	April 27, 1973	Macomb, Illinois	Active	
University of New Mexico	September 14, 1973	Albuquerque, New Mexico	Active	
University of Tampa	October 21, 1973	Tampa, Florida	Active	
West Texas A&M University	December 14, 1973 – 20xx ?	Canyon, Texas	Inactive	
University of Tennessee at Martin	May 27, 1974	Martin, Tennessee	Active	
State University of New York at Fredonia	1974–1996	Fredonia, New York	Inactive	
Troy State University	1974–1995	Troy, Alabama	Inactive	
University of Central Oklahoma	1974–2008	Edmond, Oklahoma	Inactive	
University of Memphis	1974–2010	Memphis, Tennessee	Inactive	
Campbell University	October 28, 1974	Buies Creek, North Carolina	Active	
Widener University	1975–2010, 20xx ?	Chester, Pennsylvania	Active	
East Carolina University	May 22, 1975	Greenville, North Carolina	Active	
University of Richmond	November 19, 1975	Richmond, Virginia	Active	
Midwestern State University	December 5, 1975	Wichita Falls, Texas	Active	
University of Evansville	January 18, 1976 – 2015	Evansville, Indiana	Inactive	
Indiana University Southeast	1977–2012	New Albany, Indiana	Inactive	
University of Texas at Arlington	1977–1994	Arlington, Texas	Inactive	
Delta State University	September 21, 1977 – 20xx ?	Cleveland, Mississippi	Inactive	
Georgia Southern University–Armstrong Campus	1978–1992, 20xx ?	Savannah, Georgia	Active	(Note: Chapter formed at Armstrong State College, now Georgia Southern University–Armstrong Campus.)
Pace University Pleasantville	1978–1996	Pleasantville, New York	Inactive	
University of Wisconsin–Whitewater	April 12, 1978	Whitewater, Wisconsin	Active	
Stetson University	October 18, 1978 – 20xx ?	DeLand, Florida	Inactive	
Kettering University	1979–2010	Flint, Michigan	Inactive	
Prairie View A&M University	1979–1992, 20xx ?	Prairie View, Texas	Active	
University of North Carolina Wilmington	March 17, 1979	Wilmington, North Carolina	Active	
Baker University	October 7, 1979	Baldwin City, Kansas	Active	
University of Rhode Island	December 18, 1979	Kingston, Rhode Island	Active	
Edinboro University of Pennsylvania	1980–1994	Edinboro, Pennsylvania	Inactive	
University of Pittsburgh at Johnstown	March 23, 1980	Johnstown, Pennsylvania	Active	
University of Lynchburg	August 31, 1980	Lynchburg, Virginia	Active	
Jacksonville State University	September 25, 1980	Jacksonville, Alabama	Active	
Stephen F. Austin State University	October 7, 1980	Nacogdoches, Texas	Active	
Auburn University at Montgomery	1981–2001	Montgomery, Alabama	Inactive	
Indiana University South Bend	1981–2009	South Bend, Indiana	Inactive	
Eastern Washington University	February 18, 1981	Cheney, Washington	Active	
University of Wisconsin–Stevens Point	March 9, 1981	Stevens Point, Wisconsin	Active	
Tarleton State University	April 29, 1981	Stephenville, Texas	Active	
Oklahoma City University	September 11, 1981	Oklahoma City, Oklahoma	Active	
Millsaps College	December 1, 1981	Jackson, Mississippi	Active	
Frostburg State University	December 8, 1981	Frostburg, Maryland	Active	
Pepperdine University	April 6, 1982 – 2016	Malibu, California	Inactive	
Morgan State University	April 14, 1982	Baltimore, Maryland	Active	
University of Maine at Presque Isle	April 20, 1982 – 20xx ?	Presque Isle, Maine	Inactive	
State University of New York at Cortland	April 21, 1982 – 2014	Cortland, New York	Inactive	
Northwest Missouri State University	April 28, 1982 – 20xx ?	Maryville, Missouri	Inactive	
Furman University	May 12, 1982	Greenville, South Carolina	Active	
Southern Illinois University Edwardsville	June 1, 1982	Edwardsville, Illinois	Active	
Colgate University	September 13, 1982	Hamilton, New York	Active	
University of Northern Iowa	September 14, 1982	Cedar Falls, Iowa	Active	
Missouri State University	September 20, 1982	Springfield, Missouri	Active	
Western New Mexico University	1982–1994	Silver City, New Mexico	Inactive	
Slippery Rock University of Pennsylvania	1982–2007	Slippery Rock, Pennsylvania	Inactive	
Morris Brown College	1983–1992	Atlanta, Georgia	Inactive	
State University of New York at Oswego	1983–1994	Oswego, New York	Inactive	
University of North Carolina at Charlotte	1983–2004	Charlotte, North Carolina	Inactive	
University of Pikeville	1983–2001	Pikeville, Kentucky	Inactive	
University of Vermont	1983–2003	Burlington, Vermont	Inactive	
West Chester University	1983–1994	West Chester, Pennsylvania	Inactive	
Westminster College	1983–1992	Salt Lake City, Utah	Inactive	
PennWest Clarion	January 25, 1983	Clarion, Pennsylvania	Active	(Note: Chapter formed at Clarion University of Pennsylvania, now PennWest Clarion.)
State University of New York at Plattsburgh	April 14, 1983	Plattsburgh, New York	Active	
Virginia Wesleyan University	April 22, 1983	Virginia Beach, Virginia	Active	
Trine University	April 27, 1983	Angola, Indiana	Active	
Salisbury University	May 15, 1983	Salisbury, Maryland	Active	
Castleton University	September 27, 1983 – July 1, 2023	Castleton, Vermont	Moved	(Note: Castleton University merged with Northern Vermont University and Vermont Tech to form Vermont State University in 2023.)
Grand View University	October 10, 1983	Des Moines, Iowa	Active	
Duquesne University	November 15, 1983	Pittsburgh, Pennsylvania	Active	
College of Idaho	1984–2010	Caldwell, Idaho	Inactive	
Indiana University Northwest	1984–1995	Gary, Indiana	Inactive	
Culver–Stockton College	February 3, 1984	Canton, Missouri	Active	
Southeast Missouri State University	February 5, 1984	Cape Girardeau, Missouri	Active	
Wingate University	April 3, 1984 – 20xx ?	Wingate, North Carolina	Inactive	
Florida Southern College	April 5, 1984	Lakeland, Florida	Active	
Kennesaw State University	April 30, 1984	Kennesaw, Georgia	Active	
University of Nebraska at Kearney	May 5, 1984	Kearney, Nebraska	Active	
LIU Post	October 3, 1984	Brookville, New York	Active	(Note: Chapter formed at C.W. Post Campus of Long Island University, now called LIU Post.)
Washington Adventist University	January 27, 1985	Takoma Park, Maryland	Active	
Indiana University–Purdue University Indianapolis	April 16, 1985 – 2024	Indianapolis, Indiana	Moved	(Note: IUPUI split into Indiana University Indianapolis and Purdue University in Indianapolis in 2024.)
Ohio Wesleyan University	April 18, 1985	Delaware, Ohio	Active	
North Carolina Wesleyan University	April 25, 1985	Rocky Mount, North Carolina	Active	
University of West Alabama	May 8, 1985	Livingston, Alabama	Active	
Cameron University	October 30, 1985	Lawton, Oklahoma	Active	
University of West Florida	November 22, 1985 – 20xx ?	Pensacola, Florida	Inactive	
Pace University	1985–1992	New York City, New York	Inactive	
Huntingdon College	April 22, 1986	Montgomery, Alabama	Active	
Abilene Christian University	April 26, 1986	Abilene, Texas	Active	
West Virginia State University	April 27, 1986 – 2016	Institute, West Virginia	Inactive	
Mercyhurst University	April 28, 1986	Erie, Pennsylvania	Active	
Appalachian State University	May 8, 1986 – 2012	Boone, North Carolina	Inactive	
Methodist University	1986–1994	Fayetteville, North Carolina	Inactive	
Rutgers University–New Brunswick	1986–2002	Piscataway, New Jersey	Inactive	
Wayne State University	1986–2004	Detroit, Michigan	Inactive	
Rollins College	February 7, 1987 – 2018	Winter Park, Florida	Inactive	
Gannon University	May 2, 1987	Erie, Pennsylvania	Active	
Monmouth University	October 18, 1987	West Long Branch, New Jersey	Active	
Syracuse University	December 8, 1987	Syracuse, New York	Active	
Alabama State University	1987–2012	Montgomery, Alabama	Inactive	
Averett University	1987–1997	Danville, Virginia	Inactive	
Florida A&M University	1987–2000	Tallahassee, Florida	Inactive	
Missouri Southern State University	March 3, 1988	Joplin, Missouri	Active	
University of North Carolina at Asheville	April 10, 1988 – 20xx ?	Asheville, North Carolina	Inactive	
Adrian College	September 11, 1988	Adrian, Michigan	Active	
Oglethorpe University	September 22, 1988 – 2015	Atlanta, Georgia	Inactive	
Carnegie Mellon University	1988–1992	Pittsburgh, Pennsylvania	Inactive	
Saint Louis University	1988–1994	St. Louis, Missouri	Inactive	
University of Central Florida	April 29, 1989	Orlando, Florida	Active	
University of North Georgia	May 23, 1989 – 20xx ?	Dahlonega, Georgia	Inactive	
State University of New York at Potsdam	November 10, 1989	Potsdam, New York	Active	
Arkansas Tech University	1989–2007	Russellville, Arkansas	Inactive	
Columbus State University	1989–1994	Columbus, Georgia	Inactive	
Southeastern Louisiana University	1989–1994	Hammond, Louisiana	Inactive	
Youngstown State University	1989–1992	Youngstown, Ohio	Inactive	
University of Virginia	March 4, 1990	Charlottesville, Virginia	Active	
Virginia Commonwealth University	March 4, 1990 – 20xx ?	Richmond, Virginia	Inactive	
Bluefield State University	March 19, 1990	Bluefield, West Virginia	Active	
Loyola University New Orleans	April 19, 1990	New Orleans, Louisiana	Active	
Elmira College	October 4, 1990	Elmira, New York	Active	
Coastal Carolina University	December 4, 1990	Conway, South Carolina	Active	
Northern State University	1990–2010	Aberdeen, South Dakota	Inactive	
Truman State University	1990–2007	Kirksville, Missouri	Inactive	
Aurora University	April 20, 1991	Aurora, Illinois	Active	
Georgia Southern University	October 19, 1991	Statesboro, Georgia	Active	
Florida Atlantic University	April 9, 1991 – 2018	Boca Raton, Florida	Inactive	
Sul Ross State University	1991–1997	Alpine, Texas	Inactive	
State University of New York at Geneseo	February 7, 1992	Geneseo, New York	Active	
University of Wisconsin–Green Bay	March 16, 1992	Green Bay, Wisconsin	Active	
Murray State University	April 9, 1992 – 2016	Murray, Kentucky	Inactive	
Harding University	1992–2010	Searcy, Arkansas	Inactive	
Washington State University	April 17, 1993 – 20xx ?	Pullman, Washington	Inactive	
Baruch College	April 22, 1993	New York City, New York	Active	
Emory University	April 24, 1993	Atlanta, Georgia	Active	
Millersville University of Pennsylvania	October 14, 1993 – 20xx ?	Millersville, Pennsylvania	Inactive	
Fayetteville State University	January 28, 1994	Fayetteville, North Carolina	Active	
Louisiana State University Shreveport	March 11, 1994 – 2017	Shreveport, Louisiana	Inactive	
Barry University	April 29, 1994	Miami Shores, Florida	Active	
University of South Florida	November 13, 1994 – 20xx ?	Tampa, Florida	Inactive	
Elon University	November 20, 1994	Elon, North Carolina	Active	
State University of New York at Oneonta	December 5, 1994 – 20xx ?	Oneonta, New York	Inactive	
Pacific Union College	1994–2000	Angwin, California	Inactive	
Quincy University	1994–2012	Quincy, Illinois	Inactive	
Wilkes University	1994–2003	Wilkes-Barre, Pennsylvania	Inactive	
Binghamton University	February 5, 1995	Binghamton, New York	Active	
Nazareth University	October 8, 1995	Rochester, New York	Active	(Note: Chapter formed at Nazareth College of Rochester, which became Nazareth University in 2023.)
South Dakota School of Mines and Technology	October 28, 1995	Rapid City, South Dakota	Active	
St. Augustine's University	1995–2008	Raleigh, North Carolina	Inactive	
Shawnee State University	April 9, 1996	Portsmouth, Ohio	Active	
Hofstra University	September 8, 1996	Hempstead, New York	Active	
Belmont University	1996–2009	Nashville, Tennessee	Inactive	
California State University, Fullerton	1996–2004	Fullerton, California	Inactive	
Dickinson State University	1996–2006	Dickinson, North Dakota	Inactive	
Worcester State University	March 23, 1997	Worcester, Massachusetts	Active	
Western Washington University	April 16, 1997 – 20xx ?	Bellingham, Washington	Inactive	
California State University, Northridge	1997–2007	Northridge, Los Angeles, California	Inactive	
Oakwood University	1997–2004	Huntsville, Alabama	Inactive	
Palm Beach Atlantic University	1997–2003	West Palm Beach, Florida	Inactive	
North Carolina Central University	March 21, 1998 – 20xx ?	Durham, North Carolina	Inactive	
Florida Institute of Technology	April 5, 1998 – xxxx ?; January 27, 2015	Melbourne, Florida	Active	
Virginia Military Institute	April 20, 1998 – 20xx ?	Lexington, Virginia	Inactive	
John Carroll University	September 27, 1998 – 2012	University Heights, Ohio	Inactive	
Old Dominion University	October 3, 1998	Norfolk, Virginia	Active	
Emporia State University	December 11, 1998	Emporia, Kansas	Active	
Eastern Oregon University	1998–2003	La Grande, Oregon	Inactive	
Middle Tennessee State University	1998–2009	Murfreesboro, Tennessee	Inactive	
Indiana University of Pennsylvania	March 20, 1999	Indiana, Pennsylvania	Active	
Eastern Illinois University	April 10, 1999	Charleston, Illinois	Active	
Florida Gulf Coast University	April 17, 1999	Fort Myers, Florida	Active	
University of Nevada, Las Vegas	May 3, 1999	Las Vegas, Nevada	Active	
John Jay College of Criminal Justice	May 27, 1999	New York City, New York	Active	
St. Bonaventure University	September 25, 1999	St. Bonaventure, New York	Active	
Moravian University	November 13, 1999 – 2009; February 11, 2018	Bethlehem, Pennsylvania	Active	
St. John's University	April 3, 2000	Queens, New York	Active	
University of Pittsburgh at Greensburg	April 15, 2000	Greensburg, Pennsylvania	Active	
New Mexico State University	April 27, 2000	Las Cruces, New Mexico	Active	
Wartburg College	March 31, 2001	Waverly, Iowa	Active	
University of Wisconsin–Parkside	April 13, 2003 – 20xx ?	Kenosha, Wisconsin	Inactive	
New York Institute of Technology	May 12, 2003 – 20xx ?	Old Westbury, New York	Inactive	
Georgian Court University	February 7, 2004	Lakewood Township, New Jersey	Active	
Tennessee State University	May 3, 2004	Nashville, Tennessee	Active	
Pacific University	May 19, 2004 – 20xx ?	Forest Grove, Oregon	Inactive	
Paul Quinn College	2004–2007	Dallas, Texas	Inactive	
State University of New York at New Paltz	May 15, 2005 – 2016	New Paltz, New York	Inactive	
St. Mary's University, Texas	October 18, 2005	San Antonio, Texas	Active	
Clayton State University	2005–2009	Morrow, Georgia	Inactive	
University of Puget Sound	April 18, 2006	Tacoma, Washington	Active	
Sacred Heart University	April 24, 2006	Fairfield, Connecticut	Inactive	
Purdue University North Central	May 2, 2006 – 2014	Westville, Indiana	Inactive	
Dakota State University	September 18, 2006 – 2018	Madison, South Dakota	Inactive	
College of Charleston	February 20, 2007	Charleston, South Carolina	Active	
Southwest Baptist University	April 26, 2007 – 20xx ?	Bolivar, Missouri	Inactive	
Morehead State University	May 5, 2007	Morehead, Kentucky	Active	
State University of New York at Delhi	September 29, 2007	Delhi, New York	Active	
City College of New York	2007–2011	New York City, New York	Inactive	
Dillard University	May 8, 2008 – 2015	New Orleans, Louisiana	Inactive	
Lee University	September 17, 2008	Cleveland, Tennessee	Active	
University of the District of Columbia	May 4, 2009 – 2014	Washington, D.C.	Inactive	
Boise State University	April 19, 2010 – 20xx ?	Boise, Idaho	Inactive	
Texas Southern University	November 19, 2010 – 2014	Houston, Texas	Inactive	
Emory and Henry University	April 25, 2010	Emory, Virginia	Active	
Edward Waters College	April 21, 2011 – 2015	Jacksonville, Florida	Inactive	
Whitworth University	October 18, 2011	Spokane, Washington	Active	
Gainesville State College	April 7, 2011 – 2013	Oakwood, Georgia	Moved	(Note: Gainesville State College merged into the University of North Georgia on January 8, 2013.)
Saint Francis University	March 16, 2012 – 20xx ?	Loretto, Pennsylvania	Inactive	
Indiana University–Purdue University Fort Wayne	April 22, 2012 – 2018	Fort Wayne, Indiana	Moved	(Note: IPFW split into Indiana University Fort Wayne and Purdue University Fort Wayne in 2018.)
Newbury College	May 1, 2012 – 2019	Brookline, Massachusetts	Inactive	(Note: The college closed after the 2018–19 academic year.)
Pittsburg State University	May 11, 2012	Pittsburg, Kansas	Active	
Clark Atlanta University	March 20, 2013 – 20xx ?	Atlanta, Georgia	Inactive	
Robert Morris University Illinois	June 6, 2013 – 2020	Orland Park, Illinois	Inactive	(Note: The university merged into Roosevelt University in 2020.)
University of North Georgia Gainesville Campus	2013	Oakwood, Georgia	Active	
McKendree University	April 24, 2014	Lebanon, Illinois	Active	
Marymount University	April 8, 2016	Arlington County, Virginia	Active	
Lesley University	April 25, 2016	Cambridge, Massachusetts	Active	
East Stroudsburg University of Pennsylvania	September 8, 2016	East Stroudsburg, Pennsylvania	Active	
University of Mary Washington	November 15, 2016	Fredericksburg, Virginia	Active	
Augusta University	August 11, 2017	Augusta, Georgia	Active	
Hampton University	November 8, 2018	Hampton, Virginia	Active	
Purdue University Fort Wayne	2018	Fort Wayne, Indiana	Active	
Vermont State University Castleton	July 1, 2023	Castleton, Vermont	Active	
Cedar Crest College	October 15, 2023	Allentown, Pennsylvania	Active	
Indiana University Indianapolis	2024	Indianapolis, Indiana	Active	
Cottey College		Nevada, Missouri	Active	
Cornish College of the Arts		Seattle, Washington	Active	
Dean College		Franklin, Massachusetts	Active	
Defiance College		Defiance, Ohio	Active	
Fisk University		Nashville, Tennessee	Active	
West Virginia University		Morgantown, West Virginia	Active	
Winston-Salem State University		Winston-Salem, North Carolina	Active	
