= Johnson State College =

Former state college in Johnson, Vermont, US

Coordinates: 44°38′30″N 72°40′16″W

- Motto: Docendo discimus "by teaching, we learn"
- Type: Public liberal arts college
- Active: 1828–2018; 8 years ago
- Location: Johnson, Vermont, United States
- Campus: Rural village, 350 acres (1.4 km^{2}) (main campus) 1,000 acres (4.0 km^{2}) (nature preserve)
- Merged into: Northern Vermont University
- Colors: Green, Navy, White
- Nickname: Badgers
- Sporting affiliations: NCAA Division III – NAC
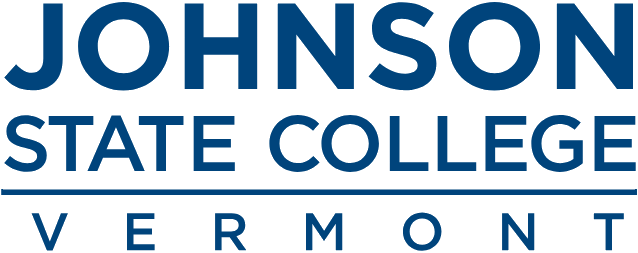

Johnson State College was a public liberal arts college in Johnson, Vermont, United States. The college was founded in 1828 by John Chesamore.

In 2018, Johnson State College merged with the former Lyndon State College to create Northern Vermont University, and later on in July 2023, Castleton University, Northern Vermont University-Johnson, Northern Vermont University-Lyndon, and Vermont Technical College merged to become Vermont State University.

== History and governance ==
John Chesamore founded Johnson State College as Johnson Academy, a grammar school instructing students in Greek, Latin, algebra, and geometry. In 1867, the school became a Vermont state "normal school", a term based on the French école normale – a school to educate teachers. Early on Johnson embraced the ideas of learning from experience, and the role of the student in directing some part of their curriculum. The college was among the first Vermont universities to introduce electives. Through the early to mid-twentieth century, Johnson emerged as a college of the liberal arts and natural sciences.

The original campus was built in the village of Johnson, and over time, the college expanded, slowly building higher upon what is now called College Hill, finally settling upon a plateau above the village with a view of Sterling Mountain and the Sterling Mountain Range.

On July 1, 2018, Johnson State College and Lyndon State College were merged, creating Northern Vermont University.

In July 2023, Castleton University, Northern Vermont University-Johnson, Northern Vermont University-Lyndon, and Vermont Technical College merged to become Vermont State University. As a part of Vermont State University, the campus remains a part of the Vermont State Colleges.

== Academics ==
Johnson emphasized the self-development of undergraduate students with what the college terms "education by engagement": the student is engaged not solely on her or his degree program, but as an adult citizen with emphasis on their place in, and contribution to, their society, nation, and world. Students began all programs with a year of interdisciplinary studies. Degree programs include the natural sciences, business, fine and performing arts, education, mathematics, literature, health sciences, writing and literature, and hospitality and tourism management.

The college had a faculty-student ratio of 1:14. Nearly 60% of undergraduate students came from Vermont, with approximately 40% coming from other U.S. states and more than a dozen nations.

Graduate programs at Johnson included an M.F.A. in Studio Arts, a Master of Arts in Education, and Master of Arts in Counseling. Portions of the M.F.A. in Studio Arts program included course work in conjunction with the Vermont Studio Center, located in the village of Johnson.

== Facilities ==
- The Dibden Center for the Arts was named for Arthur J. Dibden, president of Johnson State College from 1967 to 1969. It housed the college's Dance, Music, and Theater programs as well as gallery exhibition space for the Fine Arts programs.
- Johnson's Library and Learning Center (LLC) ohoused the largest collections of fine arts publications in Vermont and is a designated National Archives and Records Administration repository.
- John Dewey Hall on the south side of the quadrangle was built in 1963 in the International Style to house the college's library.
- Johnson's Visual Arts Center (VAC) housed the college's Visual Arts Programs, which was renovated in 2012, with studios for design, drawing, painting, printmaking, photography, sculpture, ceramics and woodworking. The Vermont Animation Festival, which showcased student and professional work, was facilitated by the VAC.
- Wilson Bentley Science Hall was named for the scientist-artist, Wilson Bentley, who first photographed snowflakes in the nineteenth century in nearby Jericho, Vermont. It housed the faculties of the Department of Mathematics and the Department of Environmental and Health Sciences.
- The Babcock Nature Preserve, located ten miles from Johnson in Eden, Vermont, is a 1,000 acre (4 km²) tract of forest land owned and maintained by the college for scientific and educational study.

== Athletics ==
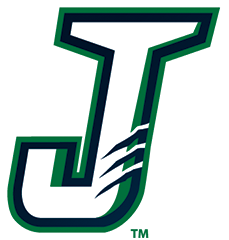
Johnson Badgers monogram

Johnson State College teams participated as a member of the National Collegiate Athletic Association's Division III. The Badgers were a member of the North Atlantic Conference (NAC). Men's sports included basketball, cross country, golf, lacrosse, soccer, tennis, track & field, and volleyball; while women's sports included basketball, cross country, soccer, softball, tennis, track & field, and volleyball.

In 2018, women's triathlon was added to the varsity sports roster, representing the only NCAA institution in New England to carry women's triathlon as a varsity sport.

== Notable alumni ==
- Susan Bartlett, former member of the Vermont Senate from the Lamoille district
- Vernon A. Bullard, United States Attorney for the District of Vermont
- Jim DeRose, head coach of the Bradley Braves men’s soccer team
- Samuel Douglass, politician who represented the Orleans district in the Vermont Senate from January 2025 to October 2025.
- Matthew Hill, former member of the Vermont House of Representatives
- Charles Clark Jamieson, U.S. Army brigadier general
- Gregory C. Knight, adjutant general of the Vermont National Guard beginning in March 2019
- Cyndi Lauper, singer, songwriter, actress and LGBT rights activist
- Raymond J. McNulty, Dean of the School of Education at Southern New Hampshire University
- Walter Mosley, crime fiction novelist
- Anthony Pollina, member of the Vermont Senate from the Washington district
- Julian Scott, Union Army drummer during the American Civil War, recipient of the Medal of Honor
- Caroline S. Woodruff, educator, president of Castleton University, president of National Education Foundation

== See also ==
- List of colleges and universities in the United States
- List of colleges and universities in Vermont

== Sources ==
- Bentley, Wilson A. and W. J. Humphreys. Snow Crystals. McGraw Hill Book Company: 1931, Dover reprint edition: 1962. ISBN 0-486-20287-9.
- Dewey, John. Experience and Education. Free Press, reprint edition: 1997. ISBN 0-684-83828-1.
- Dewey, John. Democracy and Education. Free Press, reprint edition: 1997. ISBN 0-684-83631-9.
- Graff, Nancy Price. Visible Layers of Time: A Perspective on the History and Architecture of Johnson, Vermont. The University of Vermont, Historic Preservation Program: 1990.
- Raymond, Kenneth. The History of Johnson State College: 1828-1984. Johnson State College: 1985.
- Mantell, Suzanne. Vermont: Art of the State. Henry N. Abrams, Inc., Publishers: 1998 ISBN 0-8109-5556-3
- Swift, Esther Monroe. Vermont Place Names: Footprints of History. The Stephen Greene Press: 1996 ISBN 0-8289-0291-7.
- Bulletin of Johnson State College, 1974/'05, 1976/'07.
- Johnson Views. 2003, 2004, 2005.
- Vermont Life. Fall 1971.
