= List of colleges and universities in Vermont =

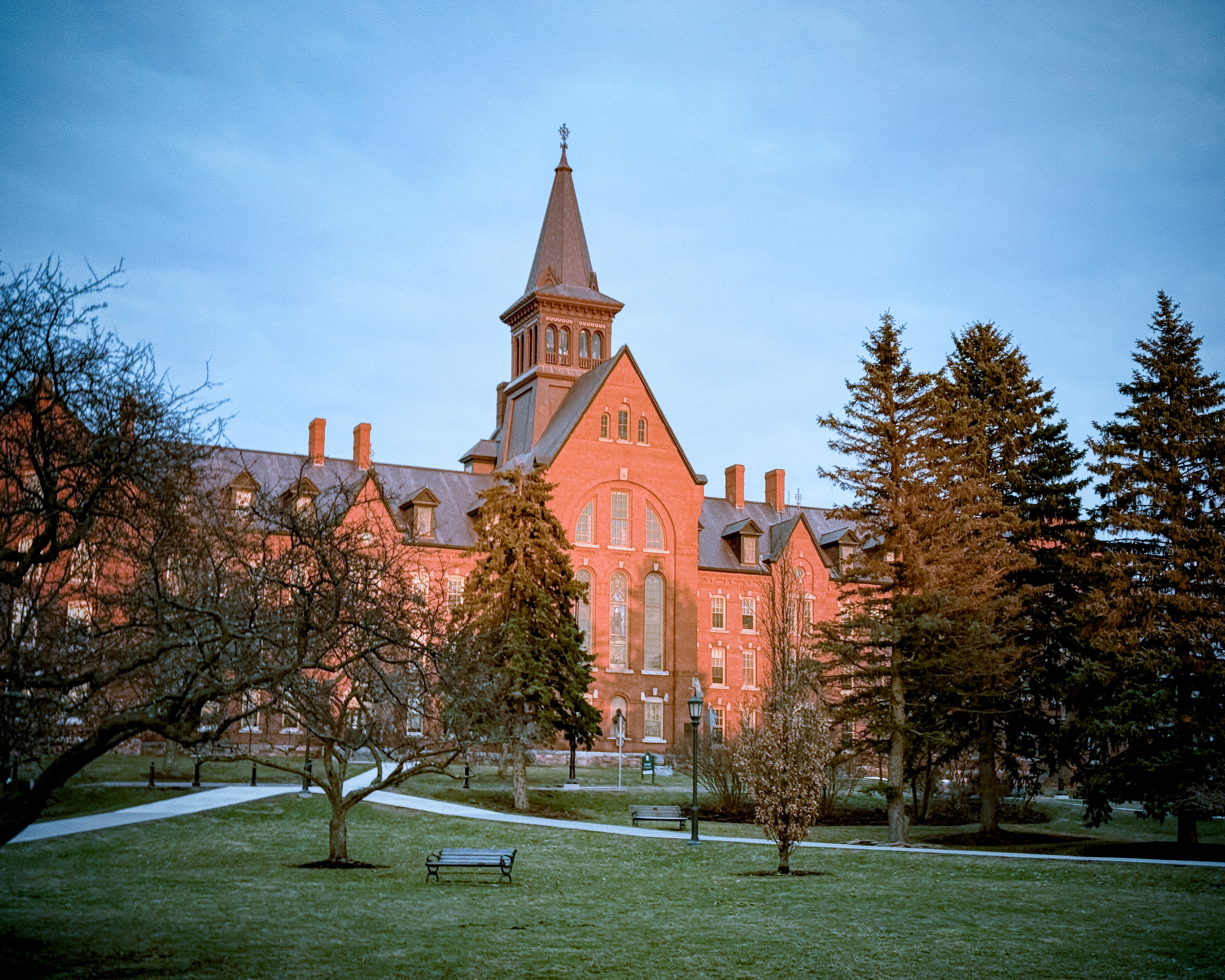
University of Vermont

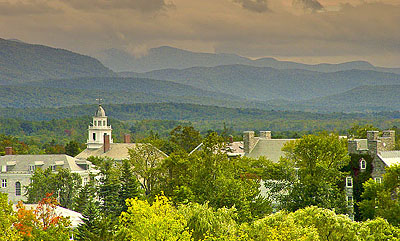
Middlebury College

There are 12 colleges and universities in the U.S. state of Vermont that are listed under the Carnegie Classification of Institutions of Higher Education. These include one research university, four master's universities, four primarily baccalaureate colleges, a law school, a community college and an art school that operates exclusively online.

There are three public institutions in Vermont, including the state's flagship public university is the University of Vermont (UVM). The other two public institutions are organized as the Vermont State Colleges system, comprising the multi-campus Vermont State University and Community College of Vermont. Colleges in Vermont range in size from UVM, with 14,476 students as of 2024, to Vermont College of Fine Arts, a private online-only art school with 190 students. All 12 institutions are accredited by the New England Commission of Higher Education.

Three schools claim to be the oldest college in Vermont. UVM was chartered in 1791 but did not begin instruction until 1800 or grant a degree until 1804. Middlebury College was chartered in 1800 and was Vermont's first college to grant an academic degree in 1802. Castleton University, which today is a campus of Vermont State University, was considered to be the oldest institution of higher learning in Vermont, having been originally chartered as a grammar school in 1787. Vermont's newest college not formed from existing institutions is Landmark College, founded in 1984 to serve students with learning disabilities.

== Institutions ==
School	Location(s)	Control	Type	Enrollment (Fall 2024)	Founded
Bennington College	Bennington	Private	Baccalaureate college	927	1932
Champlain College	Burlington	Private	Master's university	3,259	1878
Community College of Vermont	12 locations	Public	Associate's college	5,028	1970
Landmark College	Putney	Private	Baccalaureate/associate's college	672	1984
Middlebury College	Middlebury	Private	Baccalaureate college	2,803	1800
Norwich University	Northfield	Private	Master's university	3,149	1819
Saint Michael's College	Colchester	Private (Catholic)	Baccalaureate college	1,323	1904
School for International Training	Brattleboro	Private	Master's university	644	1965
University of Vermont	Burlington	Public	Research university	14,476	1791
Vermont College of Fine Arts	headquartered in Montpelier; courses are online with residencies in Valencia, California	Private	Art school	190	1831
Vermont Law and Graduate School	South Royalton	Private	Law school	722	1972
Vermont State University	5 locations	Public	Master's university	4,775	2023

== Out-of-state institutions ==
Out-of-state colleges may offer degree programs in Vermont with approval of the Vermont State Board of Education, with input from the Vermont Higher Education Council, whose members include all the colleges and universities in Vermont.

As of 2024, the only out-of-state institution offering degrees in Vermont was Southern New Hampshire University, which offered graduate degrees in education at the former Trinity College campus in Colchester.

== Unaccredited institutions ==
Two institutions are authorized by the state to offer degrees but are not accredited:

- The Center for Cartoon Studies in White River Junction offers a Masters of Fine Arts program and was founded in 2004.
- Northeastern Baptist College in Bennington offers bachelor's degrees and was founded in 2013.

== Defunct institutions ==
School	Location	Control	Type	Founded	Closed	Notes
Albany College of Pharmacy and Health Sciences	Colchester	Private	Pharmacy school	1881 (main campus in Albany, NY)	2021	Satellite campus only
Burlington College	Burlington	Private	Baccalaureate college	1972	2016	
Castleton University	Castleton	Public	Baccalaureate college	1787	2023	Merged into Vermont State University
Castleton Medical College	Castleton	Private	Medical school	1818	1862	
College of St. Joseph	Rutland	Private (Catholic)	Master's university	1956	2019	
Goddard College	Plainfield	Private	Master's university	1938	2024	
Green Mountain College	Poultney	Private (Methodist)	Baccalaureate college	1834	2019	
Johnson State College	Johnson	Public	Baccalaureate college	1828	2018	Merged with Lyndon State College to form Northern Vermont University
Lyndon State College	Lyndonville	Public	Baccalaureate college	1911	2018	Merged with Johnson State College to form Northern Vermont University
Mark Hopkins College	Brattleboro	Private	Baccalaureate college	1964	1978	
Marlboro College	Marlboro	Private	Baccalaureate college	1946	2020	Donated endowment to Emerson College to create Marlboro Institute for Liberal Arts and Interdisciplinary Studies
New England Culinary Institute	Montpelier	Private (for-profit)	Culinary school	1980	2021	
Northern Vermont University	Lyndon and Johnson	Public	Master's university	2018	2023	Merged into Vermont State University
Royalton College	South Royalton	Private	Baccalaureate college	1965	1981	
Southern Vermont College	Bennington	Private	Baccalaureate college	1926	2019	
Sterling College	Craftsbury Common	Private	Baccalaureate college	1958	2026	
Trinity College of Vermont	Burlington	Private (Catholic)	Master's university	1925	2001	
Vermont Medical College	Woodstock	Private	Medical school	1827	1856	
Vermont Technical College	Randolph and Williston	Public	Baccalaureate college	1866	2023	Merged into Vermont State University
Woodbury College	Montpelier	Private	Baccalaureate college	1975	2008	Merged into Champlain College
Windham College	Putney	Private	Baccalaureate college	1951	1978	

== See also ==
- Higher education in the United States
- List of American institutions of higher education
- List of college athletic programs in Vermont
