= Northern Vermont University =

Public university in Johnson and Lyndon, Vermont, US

Coordinates: 44.641609°N 72.671653°W

- Type: Public university
- Active: 2018–July 2023; 3 years ago
- Location: Johnson and Lyndon, Vermont, United States
- Campus: Johnson: Rural village, 350 acres (1.4 km^{2}) 1,000 acres (4 km²) (nature preserve) Lyndon: Rural 195 acres (0.79 km^{2})
- Successor: Vermont State University
- Nicknames: Badgers (Johnson); Hornets (Lyndon)
- Sporting affiliations: NCAA Division III – NAC
- Website: northernvermont.edu
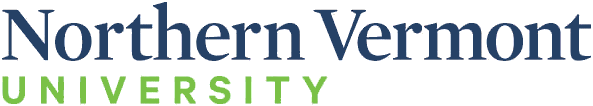

Northern Vermont University (NVU) was a public university in Johnson and Lyndon, Vermont, United States. It was established in 2018 by the unification of the former Johnson State College and Lyndon State College. The university offered over 50 Bachelor's degree programs and Master's degree programs. On July 1, 2023, its two locations became campuses of the newly formed Vermont State University.

== History ==
In September 2016, the Vermont State Colleges board of trustees voted to unify Lyndon State College with Johnson State College, located roughly 50 miles apart. The new combined institution was named Northern Vermont University, and JSC President Elaine Collins was named as NVU's first president to oversee the consolidation of both campus into the new university. The merger became effective on July 1, 2018, and ended over 100 years of the two colleges' existence as separate institutions, although the combined university remained public and under the Vermont State College system.

For many years, the Vermont public colleges have experienced financial stress and chronic underfunding. Exacerbated by COVID-19, in April 2020, Vermont State Colleges system Chancellor Jeb Spaulding recommended closing Northern Vermont University as well as Vermont Technical College. Under the proposal, which faculty, staff and others protested, some of the NVU academic programs would move to another public state college, Castleton University.

Due to ongoing financial challenges and low enrollment in the Vermont State Colleges, Northern Vermont University merged with Castleton University and Vermont Technical College to form Vermont State University which officially launched on July 1, 2023.

== Facilities ==
=== Johnson campus ===
- The Dibden Center for the Arts was named for Arthur J. Dibden, president of Johnson State College from 1967 to 1969. It housed the college's Dance, Music, and Theater programs as well as gallery exhibition space for the Fine Arts programs.
- Johnson's Library and Learning Center (LLC) ohoused the largest collections of fine arts publications in Vermont and is a designated National Archives and Records Administration repository.
- John Dewey Hall on the south side of the quadrangle was built in 1963 in the International Style to house the college's library.
- Johnson's Visual Arts Center (VAC) housed the college's Visual Arts Programs, which was renovated in 2012, with studios for design, drawing, painting, printmaking, photography, sculpture, ceramics and woodworking. The Vermont Animation Festival, which showcased student and professional work, was facilitated by the VAC.
- Wilson Bentley Science Hall was named for the scientist-artist, Wilson Bentley, who first photographed snowflakes in the nineteenth century in nearby Jericho, Vermont. It housed the faculties of the Department of Mathematics and the Department of Environmental and Health Sciences.
- The Babcock Nature Preserve, located ten miles from Johnson in Eden, Vermont, is a 1,000 acre (4 km²) tract of forest land owned and maintained by the college for scientific and educational study.

=== Lyndon campus ===
==== Theodore N. Vail Center ====
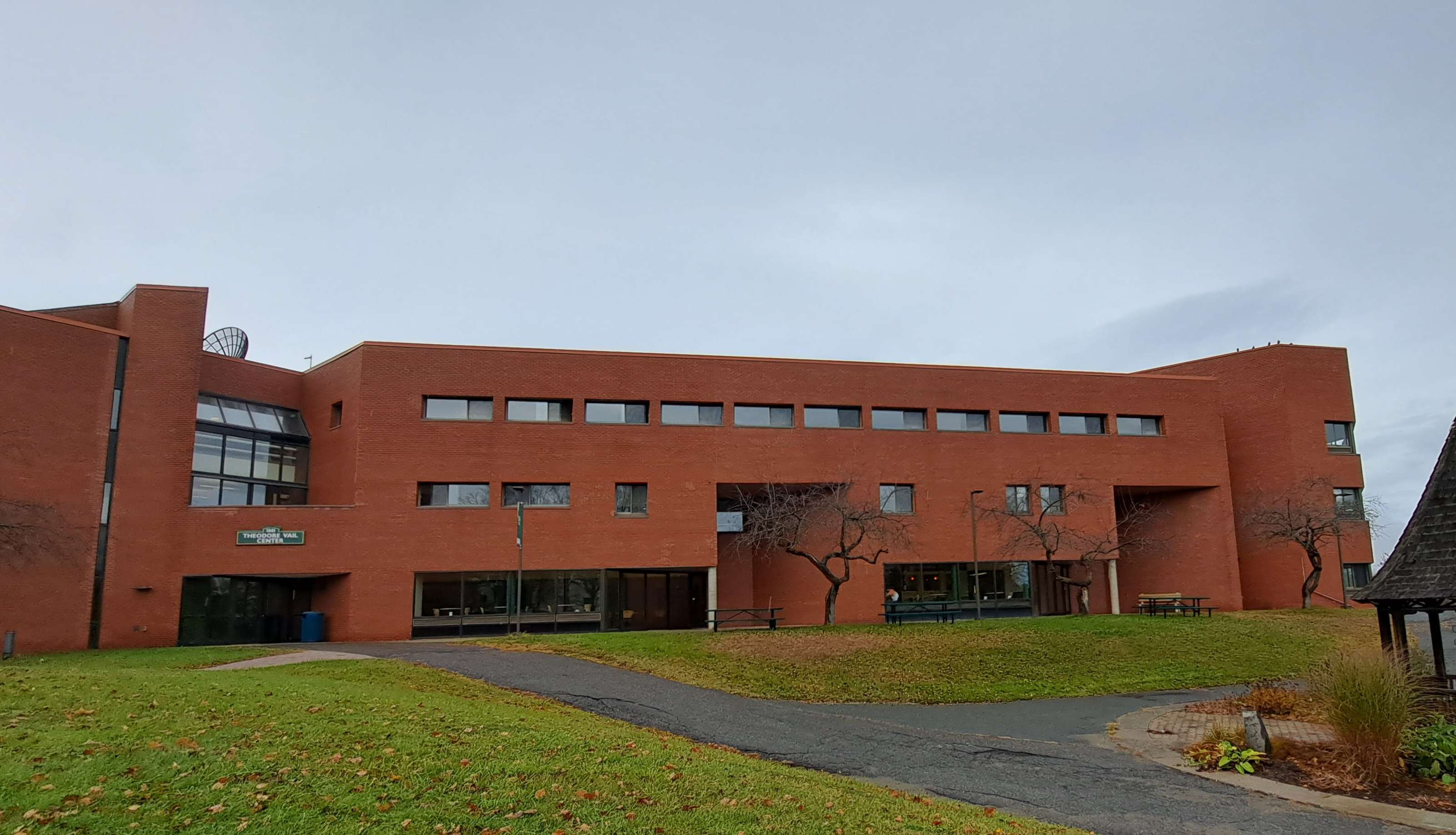
The Theodore N. Vail Center

The Vail Center has classrooms and teachers' offices, especially English, mathematics, and education. It also contains the Vail Museum, mail room and The Hornet's Nest, the campus snack bar. The science wing contains classrooms and laboratories. There is a television wing for the television studies and is home to News 7, Lyndon's daily live broadcast facility. It also contains the small Alexander Twilight Theater.

==== Samuel Read Hall Library & Academic Center ====
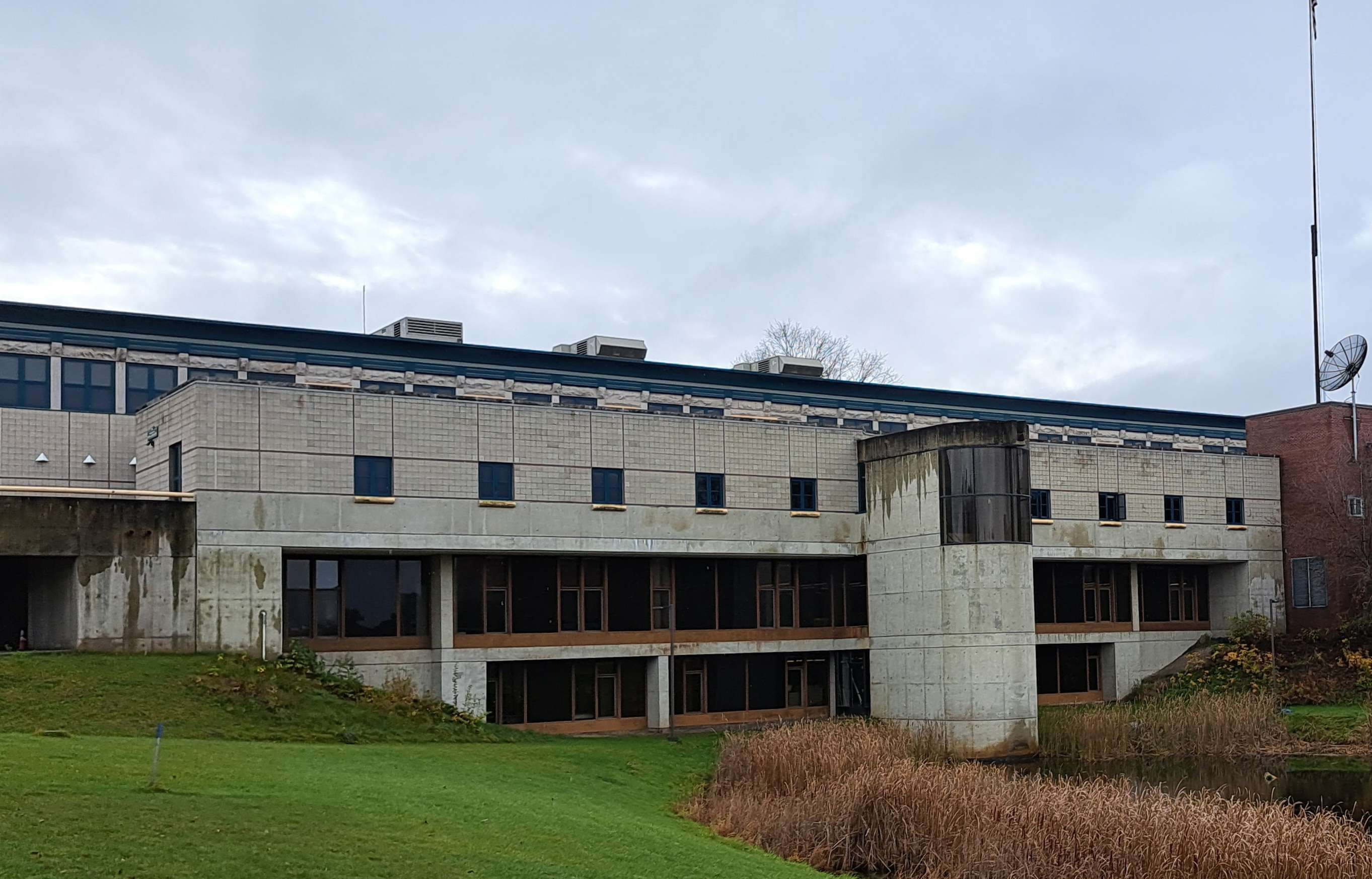
The Samuel Read Hall Library

The Samuel Read Hall Library & Academic Center (LAC) contains classrooms, a 24-hour computer lab, and the three-floor Samuel Read Hall Library. There is a large pond adjacent to the library.

==== Harvey Academic Center ====
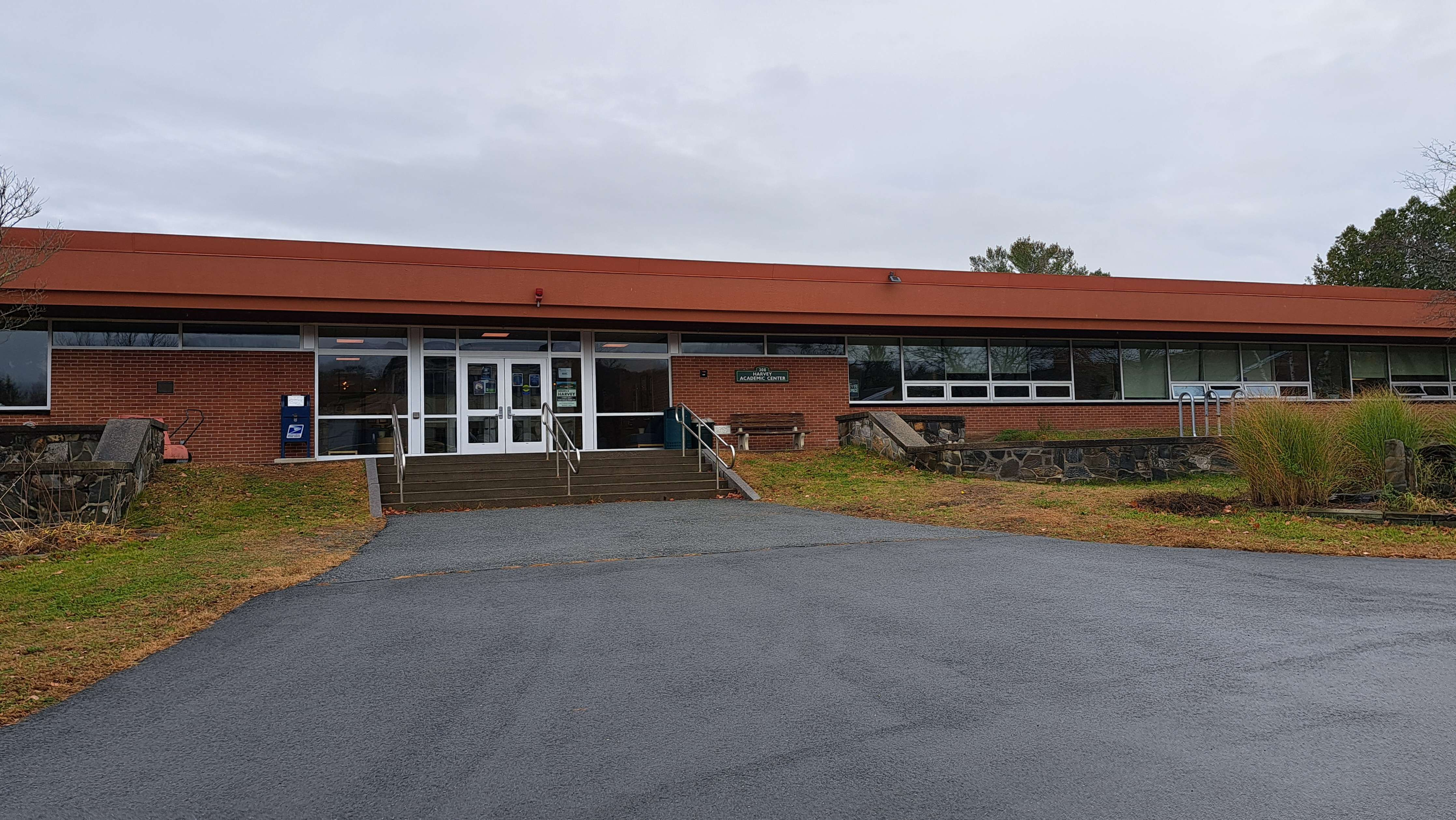
The Harvey Academic Center

The Harvey Academic Center (HAC) is located at the center of campus, and houses offices and classrooms for arts and outdoors classes. The Center also hosts the Quimby Gallery, a small regional art gallery named after alumnus Susan Quimby.

==== Academic and Student Activity Center ====
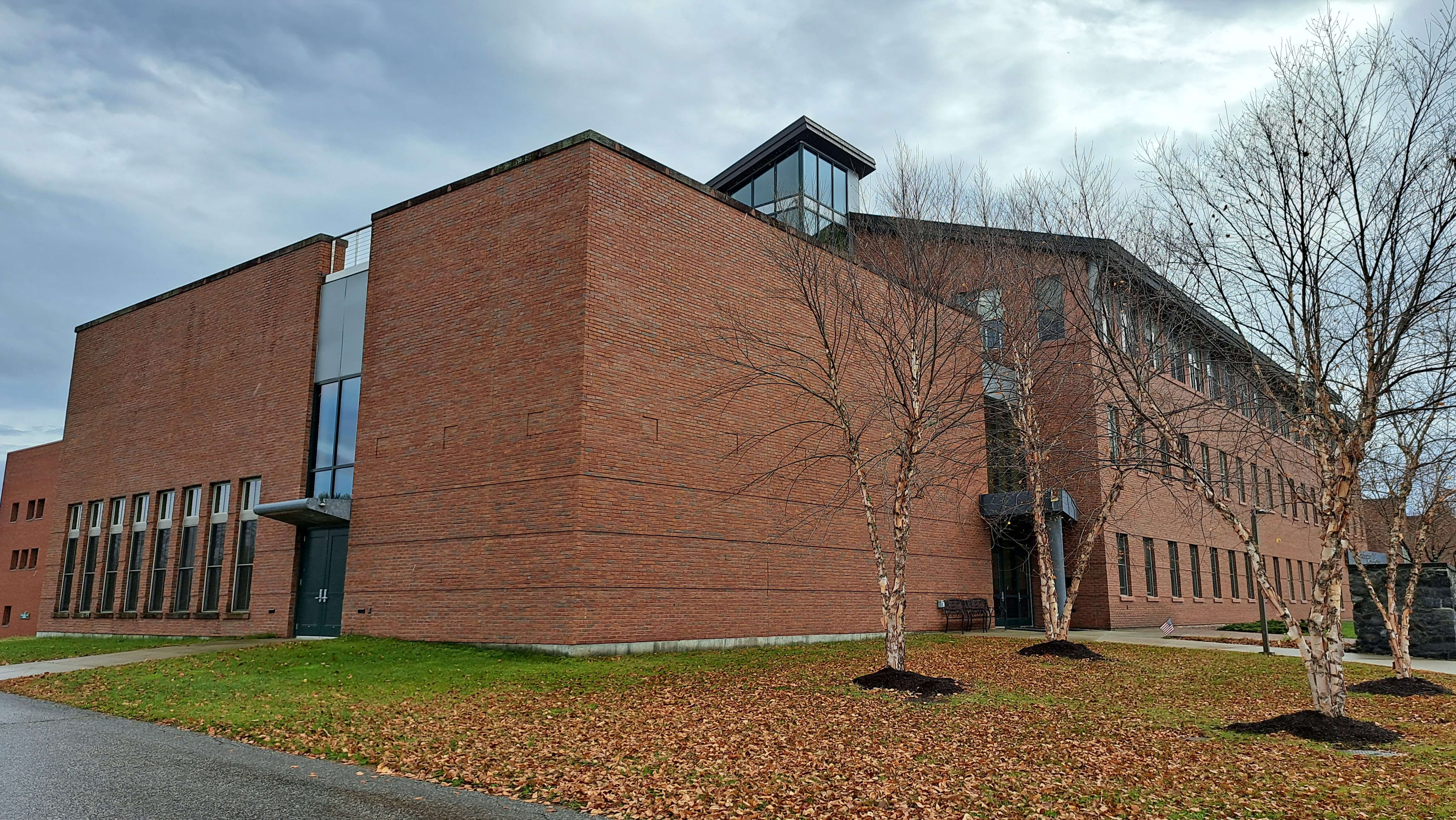
The Academic and Student Activity Center

The Academic and Student Activity Center (ASAC) is on the western side of campus, and houses science and business classrooms, along with the Moore Community Room and the university's weather station.

==== Veteran's Park ====
Veteran's Park is a small grassy common area in the center of campus dedicated to alumni and current students who served or are serving in the armed forces. Multiple walkways surround the park.

==== SHAPE Center ====
The SHAPE Center is Lyndon's fitness center, containing multiple fitness-related rooms. The George W. Stannard Gymnasium is the primary gymnasium for sporting events, with a seating capacity of 1,500. The smaller Rita L. Bole Gymnasium is primarily used for intramural athletics and exercise science classes, as it has no permanent seating. The SHAPE Center also contains a swimming pool, fitness center, racquetball court, and rock climbing wall.

==== Brown House ====
On the north side of the campus across from the baseball fields is the Brown House, the university's health and counseling center. The Brown House also houses Lyndon Rescue, Inc., a regional ambulance service that evolved from the Lyndon State Rescue Squad, a former club formed in 1972.

==== Gray House ====
The Gray House is a special residential opportunity, currently for those performing service to the community.

==== Residence halls ====
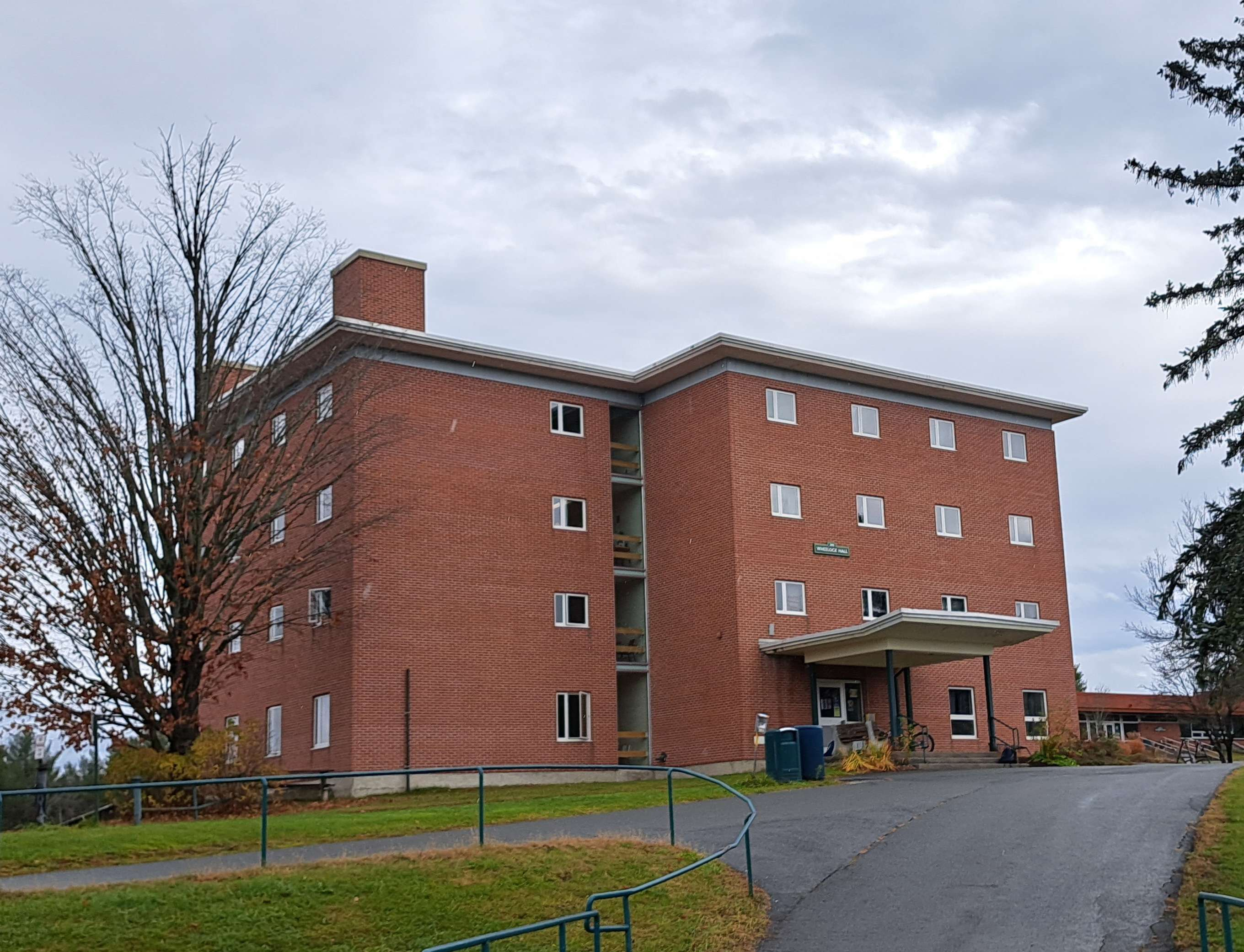
Wheelock Hall

Half of the student population lives on campus in one of the nine residence halls. The Stonehenge residence hall complex is located on the southern end of campus, and consists of six residence halls: Whitelaw/Crevecoeur (first-year students), Arnold/Bayley, and Poland/Rogers. They are clustered around a central courtyard and shaped in a circle, hence the nickname "Stonehenge." Wheelock is a residence hall that is located in the center of campus. Rita Bole is the newest of the residence halls, which features apartment-style living for upperclassmen. The ninth hall, Gray House, is a living-learning community dedicated to performing community service on campus and in the local area.

== Athletics ==
=== Johnson Badgers ===
Johnson State College teams participated as a member of the National Collegiate Athletic Association's Division III, being a member of the North Atlantic Conference (NAC).

Men's sports included basketball, cross country, golf, soccer, tennis, track & field, and volleyball. Women's sports include basketball, cross country, soccer, softball, tennis, triathlon, track & field, and volleyball. In 2018, women's triathlon was added to the varsity sports roster, representing the only NCAA institution in New England to carry women's triathlon as a varsity sport.

=== Lyndon Hornets ===
The Lyndon State Hornets are a member of the NCAA, and compete on the Division III level in the North Atlantic Conference.

LSC had 12 NCAA sponsored teams, which included baseball, basketball, cross country, lacrosse, soccer, softball, tennis, and volleyball. LSC also had five club teams, men's sice hockey, men's and women's rugby, frisbee and dance.

== Notable alumni ==
=== Lyndon State College ===
- André Bernier, 1981 (Lyndon State College), Meteorologist WJW-TV, Cleveland, Ohio
- Jim Cantore, 1986 (Lyndon State College), Meteorologist-announcer on The Weather Channel
- Nick Gregory, 1982 (Lyndon State College), Meteorologist WNYW-TV, New York City
- Monique Priestley, member of the Vermont State House

=== Johnson State College ===
- Susan Bartlett, former member of the Vermont Senate from the Lamoille district
- Jim DeRose, head coach of the Bradley Braves men’s soccer team
- Matthew Hill, former member of the Vermont House of Representatives
- Cyndi Lauper, singer, songwriter, actress and LGBT rights activist
- Raymond J. McNulty, Dean of the School of Education at Southern New Hampshire University
- Walter Mosley, crime fiction novelist
- Anthony Pollina, member of the Vermont Senate from the Washington district
- Julian Scott, Union Army drummer during the American Civil War, recipient of the Medal of Honor
