= Gender and labor in Vermont =

Gender and labor in Vermont concerns differences in employment, labor force participation, and earnings between women and men in the U.S. state of Vermont.

According to previously published estimates, women employed full-time, year-round in Vermont earned approximately 84 cents for every dollar earned by men, representing an annual earnings difference of approximately $7,589. At the time of the estimates, Vermont had the tenth-smallest gender pay gap among U.S. states.

== Background ==
In Vermont, women comprise 45% of full-time workers and 71% of year-round, part-time workers. Most workers, both women and men, are full-time; 90% of men work full-time, while 75% of women work full-time. Four out of ten, or 43%, of these women do not make enough to cover basic expenses as based on Vermont's Fiscal Office, as compared to 36% of full-time working men not earning enough. Seventeen percent of these women make less than $10.00 per hour, while 13% of these men make less than $10.00. The rate at which women, as well as men by a margin of 1%, participate in the workforce in Vermont is higher than the national average. "Currently, 66% of adult women and 69% of adult men participate in Vermont’s labor force, as compared to national averages of 58% of women and 70% of men."

More women than men are likely to live in poverty or economic insecurity, partially because they have greater responsibility to care for minor children, as illustrated by the statistic that women in poverty are 3 to 4 times more likely to live with minor children than are men. In addition to care for minors, marital status influences women's poverty. "The poverty rate for families headed by single women is 37.5% - nine times the poverty rate of married couples." Having dependent children increases the wage gap for women from 16% to 23%. Women in their senior years are more vulnerable to poverty when their median annual income from Social Security ($10,000) is half that of men ($20,000).

The wage gap exists regardless of industry, occupation or education. The Vermont Department of Labor has collected and published data of quarterly pay earnings by sex and industry since 2006. (The data file can be downloaded from the Vermont Department of Labor's website). Data of the most recently published quarters displays that within nearly all twenty two industries documented, except for educational services, health care and social assistance, finance and insurance, transportation, non-store retailers, and store retailers. There is no industry in which women earn the same or more than men. "Among the occupations with the most people working full time, year round – sales, production, management, and office and administrative support – women are paid less than men." The wage gap within industries is influenced by the breakdown in gender demographics of that industry. "A comparison of fields in which either women or men are the majority of workers shows that part of the wage gap can be explained by the fact that fields in which women have been traditionally clustered pay lower wages." Vermont women are comparatively well-educated to all women in America: 33% of adult women hold a bachelor's degree or more – six points higher than the U.S. average of 27% and four points higher than Vermont men. Women with doctoral degrees are paid less than men with master's degrees, and women with master's degrees are paid less than men with bachelor's degrees. Education does marginally lessen the education gap, earning a bachelor's degree decreases the gap from 16% to 14%.

Women are concerned about the wage gap. Less than one third of Vermont women feel they receive fair pay. On equal pay day on April 4, 2017 about 100 people, primarily women, gathered at the Vermont Statehouse to discuss wage inequality and policy that could decrease and eventually abolish this gap.

== Gender and labor laws ==
=== Family and parental leave ===
All employers who employ ten or more people for an average of at least 30 hours per week per year must offer eligible employees parental leave. Parental leave is available to people of all genders, and replaced Vermont's earlier maternity leave law in 1992, which only applied to women. Employees may take parental leave during their own pregnancy, after their spouse gives birth, or after their newly adopted child is placed in the home. Family leave is available to employees who seriously ill or have a seriously ill family member. All employers who employ fifteen or more people for an average of at least 30 hours per week per year must offer eligible employees family leave. Employees may take up to 12 weeks of unpaid parental leave, 12 weeks of unpaid family leave or a combination of 12 weeks of unpaid parental and family per year. Vermont is one of the few states to offer short-term family leave. Short-term family leave may be used to attend routine family or medical-related events of less than a full day, such as parent-teacher conferences, routine medical appointments or accompanying family members to routine medical appointments. Vermont law stipulates that employers provide unpaid leave. However, if an employer offers paid leave (such as personal days, sick days or vacation), an employee may use up to six weeks of earned paid leave as part of family or parental leave.

In most cases, Vermont offers more generous family and parental leave than federal laws.

In 2017, a bill was introduced into the Vermont Legislature which called for a 0.93 percent tax on all employees starting in 2019. The money collected through this tax would be pooled to pay for up to 12 weeks paid time off for the birth of a child, a serious personal illness or the care of a seriously ill family member. The bill initially passed through the House General, Housing and Military Affairs Committee in March 2017, but is not expected to become law during the 2017 Legislative session.

=== Sexual harassment ===
Sexual harassment is illegal in the state of Vermont and is against the Vermont Fair Employment Practices Act (Title 21, Chapter 5, Subchapter 6 of the Vermont Statutes) as well as Title XII of the Civil Rights Act of 1964 (42 United States Code Section 2000e et seq.) According to Vermont State Law Sexual Harassment is defined as any form of sexual discrimination and or means unwelcome sexual advances, requests for sexual favors, and other physical or verbal conduct of a sexual nature when: submission to that conduct is made either explicitly or implicitly a term or condition of the employer or, submission to and or rejection of that conduct by an individual is used as a component of the basis for employment decisions affecting that individual, or the conduct has the purpose or effect of substantially interfering with the individual's work performance, or creating an intimidating, hostile or offensive work environment.

There are two forms of sexual harassment. The first, Quid Pro Quo or “This for that,” is when an employee's job or benefits depends on their participation in any form of “unwanted” sexual favors and activities. Quid Pro Quo harassment is also defined as when the act of refusing sexual advancements results in a negative job-related action such as a bad evaluation or termination. The second form of sexual harassment is defined as a Hostile Environment which is when is defined as when unwanted sexual conduct creates an offensive, uncomfortable, or discriminatory work environment.

Discrimination based on a person's sex may be considered sexual harassment even if the discrimination is non-sexual in nature. For example, commenting that a person can't do their job because of their sex may be considered a form of sexual harassment. It is against the law for employers to punish an employee for filing a complaint of sexual harassment and steps will be taken to protect the identity of the employee following the filing of the complaint except as will be reasonably necessary to complete an investigation against the charged party.

=== Tipped Labor and Service Industry ===
Service or tipped employees in Vermont who receive more than $120.00 per month in tips may be paid at a lower rate than the minimum wage. As of 1/1/17, the basic tipped wage rate in Vermont is $5.00 and the minimum wage is $10.00. On 1/1/18 the basic tipped wage rate will be $5.25 and the minimum wage will be $10.50. If an employee does not earn enough tips to meet the minimum wage, employers are legally required to make up the difference. The majority of tipped employees are women. Nationally, females in the restaurant industry file sexual harassment claims with the EEOC at five times the average rate.

=== Discrimination in the Workplace ===
Vermont law protects against discrimination throughout all stages of the hiring and employment process. It encourages employees to consider whether they were discriminated against in recruitment, hiring, firing, training, job assignments, promotions, pay, benefits, lay offs, leave, treatment, and others. Vermont's Fair Employment Practices Act offers protection from pay discrimination and allows victims of pay discrimination to challenge unequal wages.

==== Nursing in the workplace ====
Vermont's labor law was amended in May 2008 to include women's rights to nursing. Employers must provide reasonable time, either compensated or uncompensated, throughout the day for the employee to express breast milk for her nursing child, as well as provide a reasonable accommodating space for breastfeeding that is not a bathroom stall. However, employers may be exempted if providing these accommodations disrupts operations. Vermont law provides protection for women who breastfeed in public places.

== Gender and educational labor ==
Educational labor in Vermont includes teaching positions, as well as student support staff, librarians, athletic coaches, administrators, maintenance and security, transportation, and food services. This category includes jobs at Vermont's primary and secondary schools, as well as positions at Vermont's twenty-two colleges and universities. Particular categories of educational labor in the state of Vermont are performed by a majority of women, such as K-6 teachers and staff positions; however, women in higher education in Vermont are employed in tenure track faculty positions at lower rates than men.

K-12 education provides one of the largest sources of employment for women in the state of Vermont, with 79% of K-12 teaching jobs, and 88% of teaching positions from pre-kindergarten to 6th grade, being filled by women in 2016–2017. However, women are administrators in K-12 schools at lower rates.

Higher education in Vermont also has disparities in gender employment based on particular positions. Universities and colleges in Vermont have fewer women employed in tenure track faculty positions than men, and higher rates of female staff members. For example, while 54% of people employed by The University of Vermont identify as female, only 40% of tenure track faculty are women. On the other hand, 61% of the University's staff are women. At Middlebury College, in 2011, 42% of the teaching faculty were women, but only 27% were hired on tenure track positions.

== Gender and agricultural labor ==
The USDA's campaign #WomenInAg calculated that, in Vermont, women's involvement in agriculture accounts for $42.7 million across 616,964 acres of land. According to the USDA Vermont, women make up 39.3% of the total farm operators in Vermont and 22.4% are the principal operator. Vermont ranks 8th in percentage of total female farm operators.

1. Arizona: 44.8%
2. Alaska: 42.7%
3. New Hampshire : 42.4%
4. Massachusetts: 41.6%
5. Maine: 41.0%
6. Oregon: 39.3%
7. Nevada: 39.3%
8. Vermont: 39.3%
9. Connecticut: 39.1%
10. Rhode Island: 37.6%

Vermont ranks 9th in the nation for percentage of principal female operators

1. Arizona: 39.2%
2. Alaska: 32.8%
3. Massachusetts: 32.3%
4. New Hampshire : 30.9%
5. Maine: 29.1%
6. Connecticut: 25.2%
7. Rhode Island: 24.6%
8. Hawaii: 22.5%
9. Vermont: 22.4%

Women’s Agricultural Network was established in 1995 to provide education and technical assistance to women farmers. WAgN is a collaborative effort of the University of Vermont Extension and the United States Department of Agriculture.

WAgN provides courses, workshops and learning circles for business management and decision making.

== Gender and entrepreneurship ==
Vermont's 2016 Status Report indicated that 7.25% of all working age women in the state of Vermont own a business as their primary occupation. This percentage nearly doubles that of the national average, which is 3.9% of women. These women-owned businesses in Vermont produce annual revenues of $2.2 billion. 32% of privately owned businesses are owned by women; however, only 11% of these businesses have annual revenues that exceed $100,000 as opposed to 29% of male privately owned business which exceed $100,000. In fact, female-owned firms generate just 19 cents to every dollar that is generated by male-owned business. Reports in 2017 show 71% of all reporting non-profit organizations have a female CEO. Of these organizations, only 46.1% operate with budgets that exceed $1 million. Of the remaining 29% of non-profit organizations that are led by men, 53.9% operate on budgets above $1 million.

Vermont's 2017 Status Report indicated that only 8% of Vermont's highest grossing companies are led by women. When removing data from hospitals, colleges, and universities—which are not among those listed in the Fortune 500—the statistic drops to 4% of women at the head of Vermont's highest grossing companies. Women represent 28.6% of Vermont prison superintendents, 23% of EMS district chiefs, 3.4% of Vermont police chiefs, less than 1% of fire chiefs, and non of Vermont's 14 sheriffs.

Women-owned and led businesses have demonstrated to be crucial in Vermont's economy by employing over 36,000 people. Further academic research presented in Vermont's Status 2017 Report demonstrates that gender diversity in Vermont's leadership has many benefits, including improving the corporate bottom line and decision-making, increasing innovation, and ensuring that women's experiences and concerns will be acknowledged in companies' policies, products, and priorities.
