= List of college athletic programs in Vermont =

This is a list of college athletic programs in the U.S. state of Vermont.

== NCAA ==
Full NCAA member colleges in Vermont.
– DI Non-Football, – DII Non-Football
– DIII Football, – DIII Non-Football

=== Division I ===
Team	School	City	Conference	Sport sponsorship					
Team	School	City	Conference	Basketball		Ice hockey		Soccer	
Team	School	City	Conference	M	W	M	W	M	W
Vermont Catamounts	University of Vermont	Burlington	America East	Yes	Yes	Yes (Note: Vermont's ice hockey teams compete in Hockey East.)	Yes	Yes	Yes

=== Division II ===
Team	School	City	Conference	Sport sponsorship							
Team	School	City	Conference	Basketball		Baseball	Softball	Ice hockey		Soccer	
Team	School	City	Conference	M	W	Baseball	Softball	M	W	M	W
Saint Michael's Purple Knights	Saint Michael's College	Colchester	Northeast-10	Yes	Yes	Yes	Yes	Yes	Yes (Note: Saint Michael's women's ice hockey team competes in Division I as a member of the New England Women's Hockey Alliance.)	Yes	Yes

=== Division III ===
Team	School	City	Conference	Sport sponsorship								
Team	School	City	Conference	Football	Basketball		Baseball	Softball	Ice hockey		Soccer	
Team	School	City	Conference	Football	M	W	Baseball	Softball	M	W	M	W
Middlebury Panthers	Middlebury College	Middlebury	NESCAC	Yes	Yes	Yes	Yes	Yes	Yes	Yes	Yes	Yes
Norwich Cadets	Norwich University	Northfield	Great Northeast	Yes (Note: Norwich's football team competes in the New England Women's and Men's Athletic Conference.)	Yes	Yes	Yes	Yes	Yes (Note: The men's and women's ice hockey teams of Norwich compete in the Little East Conference.)	Yes	Yes	Yes
Castleton Spartans	Vermont State University Castleton	Castleton	Little East	Yes (Note: Castleton's football team competes in the New Jersey Athletic Conference.)	Yes	Yes	Yes	Yes	Yes	Yes	Yes	Yes
Johnson Badgers	Vermont State University Johnson	Johnson	North Atlantic	No	Yes	Yes	No	Yes	No	No	Yes	Yes
Lyndon Hornets	Vermont State University Lyndon	Lyndonville	North Atlantic	No	Yes	Yes	Yes	Yes	No	No	Yes	Yes

== USCAA ==
Team	School	City	Conference
Vermont Tech Green Knights	Vermont State University Randolph	Randolph	Yankee

== Independent ==
Team	School	City	Sport sponsorship						
Team	School	City	Basketball		Baseball	Softball	Soccer	XC	
Team	School	City	M	W	M	W	Co-ed	M	W
Landmark Sharks	Landmark College	Putney	Yes	Yes	Yes	Yes	Yes	Yes	Yes

== See also ==
- List of colleges and universities in Vermont
- List of NCAA Division I institutions
- List of NCAA Division II institutions
- List of NCAA Division III institutions
- List of USCAA institutions
