= Lyndon State College =

Public college in Lyndon, Vermont (1911–2018)

Coordinates: 44°32′07″N 72°01′31″W

Vermont State University Lyndon
- Motto: Ad Illuminandum Regnum
- Motto in English: Toward a Brightening Kingdom
- Type: Public liberal arts college
- Active: 1911–2018
- Location: Lyndonville, Vermont, United States
- Campus: Rural 195 acres (0.79 km^{2})
- Merged: with Johnson State College to create Northern Vermont University
- Colors: Green and Yellow
- Mascot: Hornet

Lyndon State College was a public liberal arts college in Lyndon, Vermont. In 2018, it merged with Johnson State College to create Northern Vermont University; the former campus of Lyndon State College is now the university's Lyndon campus. In July 2023, Castleton University, Northern Vermont University-Johnson, Northern Vermont University-Lyndon, and Vermont Technical College merged to become Vermont State University. It is accredited by the New England Association of Schools and Colleges.

== History ==
In 1911, the college was founded as a one-year normal school housed in rented space in nearby Lyndon Institute. Consistent with education tradition of the times, the Lyndon Training Course expanded its curriculum in one-year increments, and the first two-year class graduated in 1923. In 1927, Rita Bole became principal of the school. The first three-year class, consisting of nine students, graduated in 1934. In 1944, the state allowed Lyndon to grant four-year degrees so long as it remained a teacher training institution. The first four-year degrees were granted to 18 students in 1944.

Bole, who led the school until 1955, encouraged the Vermont State Legislature to establish Lyndon Teachers College, saw the admission of the first male and first out-of-state students during the 1940s, and oversaw the move to the Theodore Newton Vail estate. Vail had been instrumental in the establishment of Lyndon Institute, and Bole recognized his vacant estate as the perfect place to house the growing school. The move to Vail Manor was completed on June 30, 1951, the final day of the school's lease at Lyndon Institute.

In 1961, the State Legislature established the Vermont State Colleges system, a consortium of Vermont's five public colleges governed by a common board of trustees, chancellor and Council of Presidents and Lyndon Teachers College became Lyndon State College. This marked the beginning of a period of rapid growth and, in 1964, the campus began to expand. A library, a dormitory, a dining hall, a science wing, a gymnasium, and a theater were built. These additions began meeting the needs of a growing student population that also brought a rapid expansion of the Lyndon curriculum. In the 1970s, new majors were developed in business administration, special education, recreations, meteorology, communications, human services, and physical education. It was also during this decade that the original Vail Manor was deemed unsafe and was replaced with the Theodore N. Vail Center that now houses the Vail Museum and preserves the name that has become an integral part of the Lyndon State tradition.

In 2005, a new residence hall was constructed near Wheelock Hall. The building was named The Rita L. Bole Complex, after the principal of Lyndon Normal School.

In 2009, the Academic and Student Activity Center, a LEED-certified, or "green" building, was constructed to house Lyndon's Business, Exercise Science and Meteorology majors. It also contains computer labs, classrooms and a student event center.

In September 2016, the VSC board of trustees voted to merge Lyndon State College with Johnson State College, located roughly 50 miles (80 km) away. The new combined institution was named Northern Vermont University, and JSC President Elaine Collins was named as NVU's first president to oversee the consolidation of both campus into the new university.

In July 2023, Castleton University, Northern Vermont University-Johnson, Northern Vermont University-Lyndon, and Vermont Technical College merged to become Vermont State University.

== Campus ==
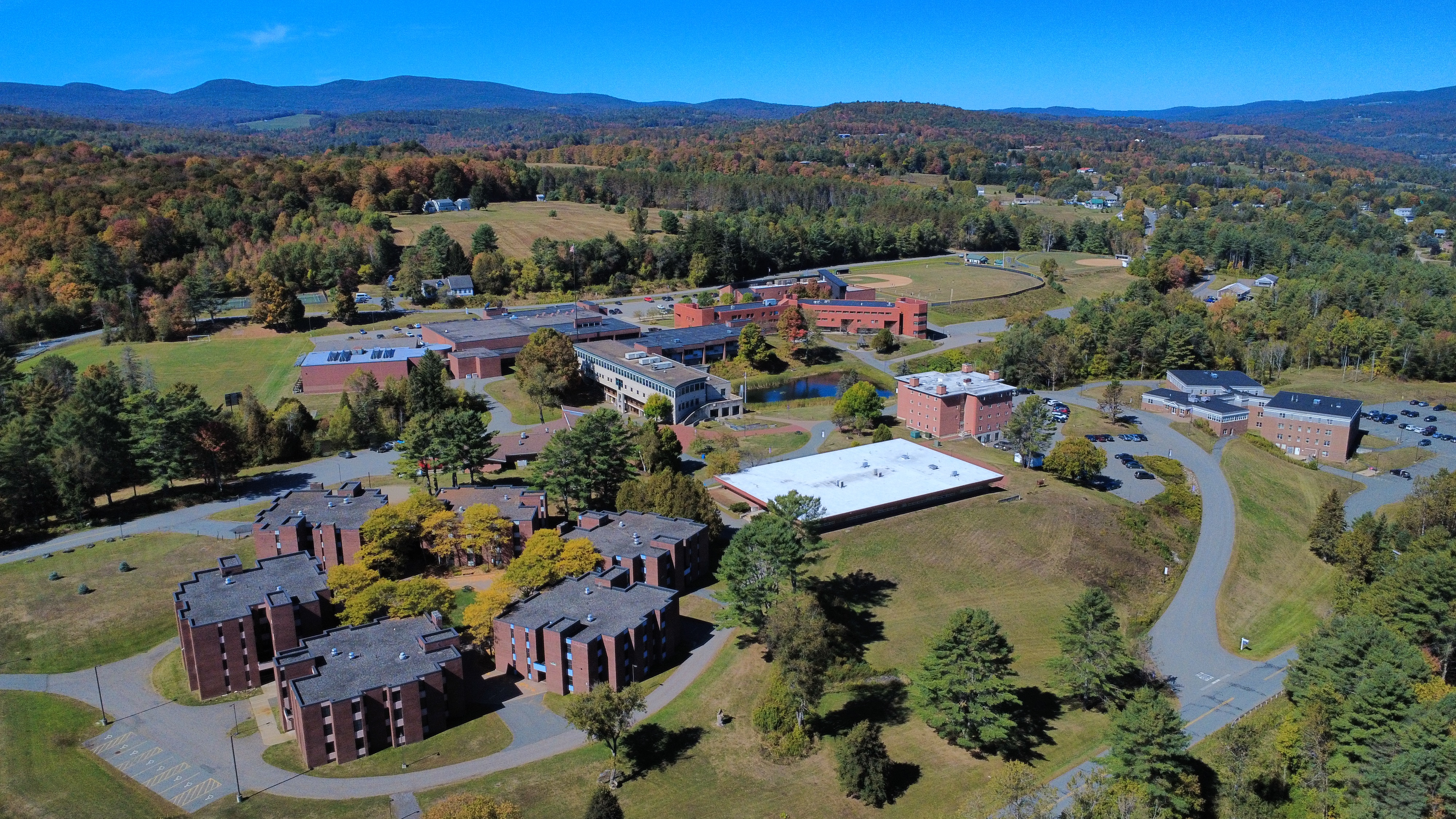
View of Vermont State University, Lyndon Campus, from the southeast

The Vail Center had classrooms, and teachers' offices, including English, mathematics, and education. It also contained the bookstore, student center, and snack bar. The science wing contained classrooms and laboratories. There was a television wing for the television studies and was home to News 7, LSC's daily live broadcast facility. It also contained the small Alexander Twilight Theater. It was connected to the Library and Academic Center (LAC).

LAC contained classrooms, a 24-hour computer lab, and the three-floor Samuel Read Hall Library.

The Harvey Academic Center was located at the center of campus and housed offices and classrooms for Recreation Studies and other programs.

The center of campus was centered around a small pond until the summer of 2019. It was filled in and made into a park. There was a large pond across from the library. Adjacent to the park was the Stevens Dining Hall.

Adjacent to the theater was the Stannard Gymnasium. The smaller gym, known as the Rita Bole Gymnasium (there is also a Rita Bole residence hall) was used for basketball games, floor hockey, and a wide variety of intramural sports. In this complex was a 25 metres (82 ft) swimming pool, racquetball court, rock climbing wall, and a fitness center.

On the north side of the campus, across from the baseball fields, was the Brown House containing a dispensary. The Gray House was a special residential opportunity, most recently for those performing service to the community.

== Student life ==
=== Residence halls ===
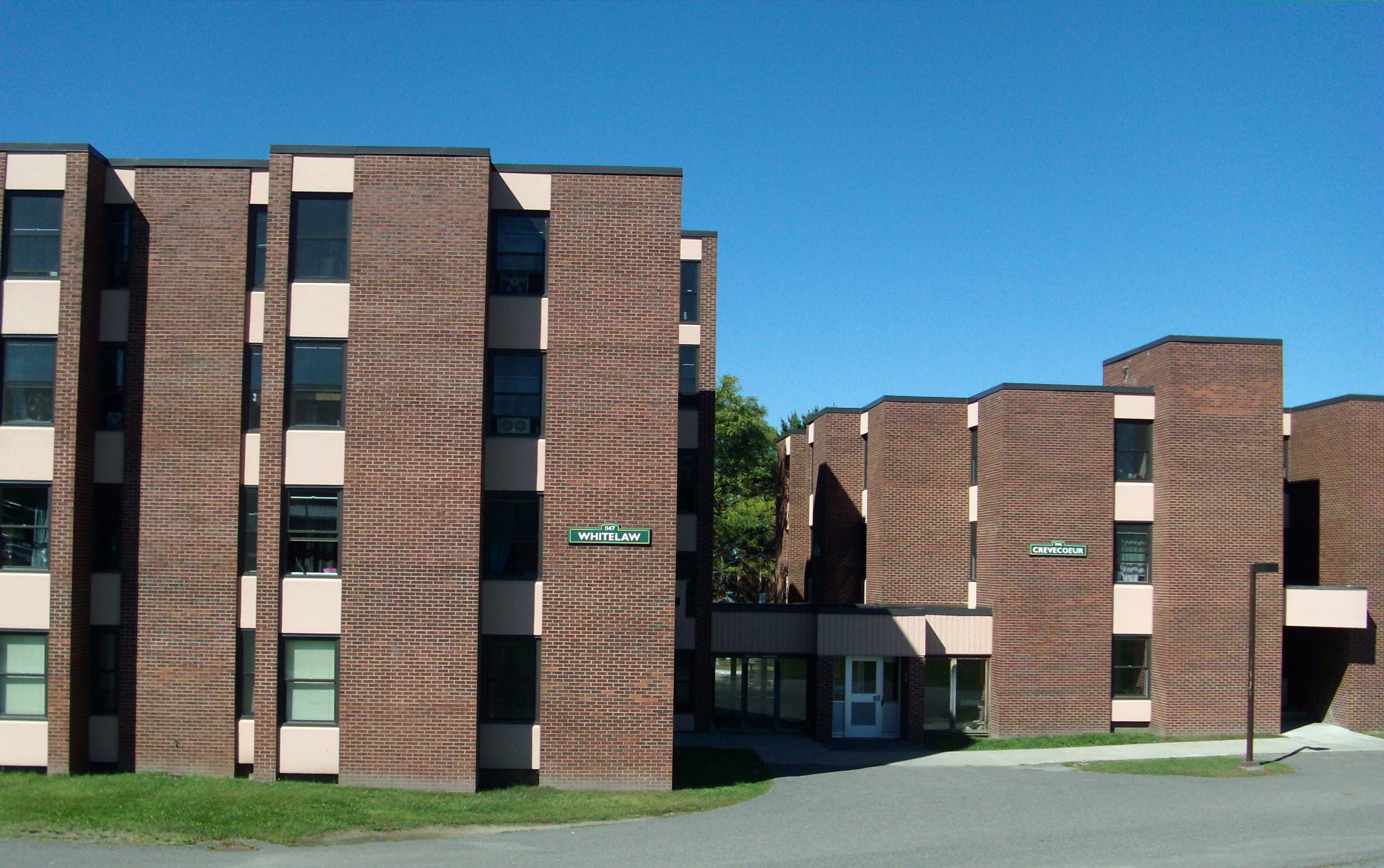
Residence Halls: Whitelaw (left) and Crevecoeur (right)

Half of the student population lived on campus in one of the nine residence halls. The Stonehenge residence hall complex was located on the southern end of campus and consisted of six residence halls: Whitelaw/Crevecoeur (first-year students), Arnold/Bayley, and Poland/Rogers. They were clustered around a central courtyard and shaped in a circle, hence the nickname "Stonehenge." Wheelock was a residence hall in the center of campus. Rita Bole was the newest of the residence halls, which featured apartment-style living for upperclassmen. The ninth hall, Grey House, was a living-learning community dedicated to performing community service on campus and in the local area.

== Athletics ==
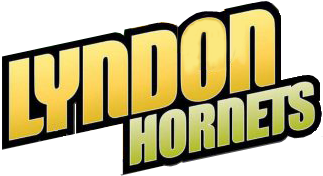
Lyndon Hornets wordmark

Lyndon State College teams participated as a member of the National Collegiate Athletic Association's Division III. The Hornets were a member of the North Atlantic Conference (NAC).

Men's sports included baseball, basketball, cross country, lacrosse, soccer and tennis; while women's sports included basketball, cross country, soccer, softball, tennis and volleyball. Club sports teams included men's ice hockey, men's rugby, women's rugby, ultimate frisbee and a dance team.

== Notable alumni ==
- Joe Benning, 1979, member of the Vermont Senate
- André Bernier, 1981, meteorologist at WJW-TV, Cleveland, Ohio
- Pete Bouchard, 1992, meteorologist at WBTS-TV and other stations
- Jim Cantore, 1986, meteorologist-announcer at The Weather Channel
- Justin Chenette, 2012, member of the Maine House of Representatives and Maine Senate
- Mia Consalvo, 1991, college professor and author
- Nick Gregory, 1982, meteorologist at WNYW-TV, New York City
- Al Kaprielian, 1983, meteorologist at WBIN-TV, WLMW-FM, and other stations
- Wayne G. Kenyon, 1955, member of the Vermont House of Representatives
- Matthew P. Mayo, author
- Howard Wilbert Nowell, 1889, physician and research scientist
- Norm Sebastian, 1979, meteorologist at The Weather Channel and WNYT-TV
- Catherine Toll, 1981, member of the Vermont House of Representatives
- Chip Troiano, 1976, member of the Vermont House of Representatives

== See also ==
- Northern Vermont University, successor
