= Howard Wilbert Nowell =

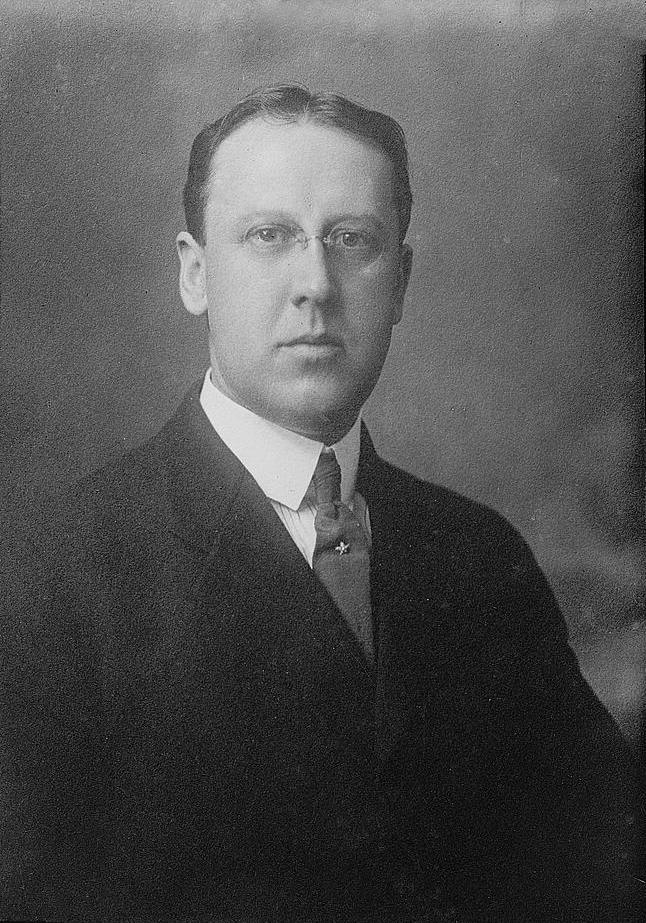

Howard Wilbert Nowell (May 16, 1872 – 1940), was instructor in pathology at Boston University, and a pioneering cancer researcher. He had an early incorrect hypothesis for the cause of cancer, and an early treatment involving a serum derived from rabbits, that was touted as effective, but did not survive rigorous testing.

== Biography ==
He was born in Merrimacport, Massachusetts on May 16, 1872. He graduated from Lyndon State College, and the following year took a course at the Massachusetts College of Pharmacy and Health Sciences. He studied medicine at Boston University, and he graduated in 1911. He became an instructor of pathology at Boston University School of Medicine from 1911 to 1913, and professor at the same institution 1913 to 1915. He was pathologist at the Massachusetts Homeopathic Hospital 1911 to 1913 and special pathologist for the Evans Memorial for Preventive Medicine and Clinical Research. In 1913 he published a report of research work on cancer.
