= Pei-heng Chiang =

Chinese-born American scholar (1929–2008)

Pei-heng Chiang (October 21, 1929 – January 3, 2008) was a Chinese-born American scholar.

Born in Hankou, China, Chiang emigrated to the United States and taught political science and political philosophy at Castleton State College in Castleton, Vermont, beginning in 1968, through 2000. She was a leading scholar on the United Nations and wrote extensively on its functions, including Non Governmental Organizations.

Chiang died on January 3, 2008, in New York.
