= Scientia est lux lucis =

Motto

Scientia est lux lucis is Latin for "knowledge is enlightenment" (literally "knowledge is the light of light"), also rendered as "scientific knowledge is enlightenment." This is believed to have been said by Leonardo da Vinci (April 15, 1452 – May 2, 1519), the archetypal Renaissance man.

The phrase is the motto of the Vermont State Colleges, a consortium of public colleges in the U.S. state of Vermont.

The phrase is also the official motto of the UK-based publishing house Palladian Publications and the National Intelligence University in Washington, DC.
