= Caroline S. Woodruff =

American educator

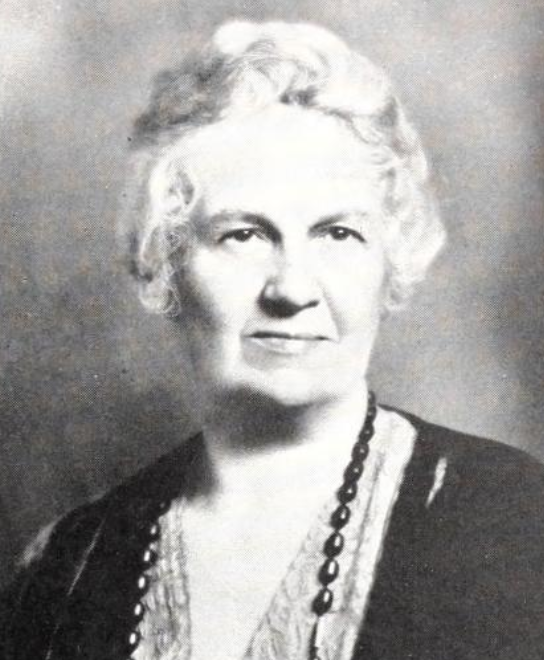
- Caroline S. Woodruff, from a 1937 publication of the US Department of the Interior
- Born: July 15, 1866; West Burke, Vermont
- Died: July 13, 1949 (aged 72); Castleton, Vermont
- Occupations: Educator, college president
- Relatives: Charles Woodruff (uncle)

Caroline Salome Woodruff (July 15, 1866 – July 13, 1949) was an American educator and poet from Vermont. She was president of the National Education Association from 1937 to 1940.

She was principal of the Castleton Teachers' College from 1921 to 1940.

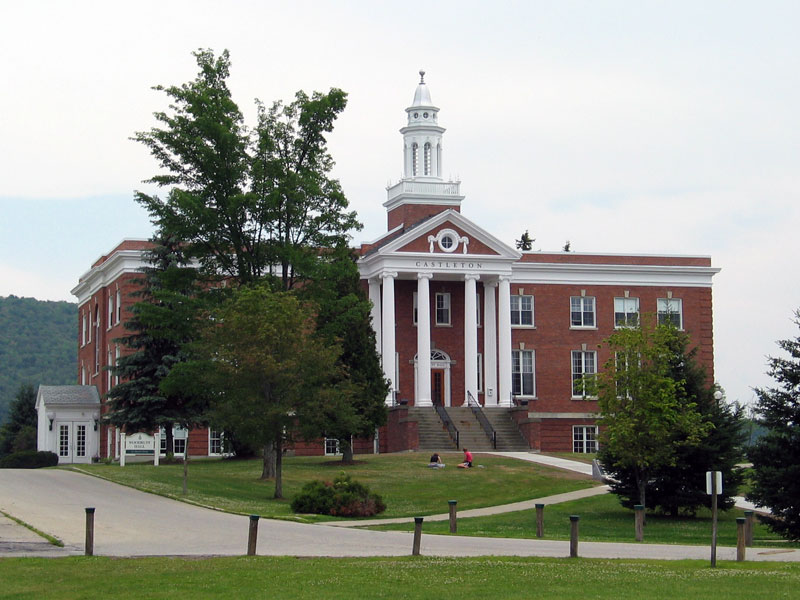
Woodruff Hall at Castleton University, named for Caroline S. Woodruff

== Early life and education ==
Woodruff was born in West Burke, Vermont, the daughter of George Washington Woodruff and Octavia Darshula Bemis Woodruff. Her uncle was Charles Woodruff, a noted general in the United States Army. She graduated St. Johnsbury Academy in 1884, and from Johnson Normal School in 1918. In 1925, she received an honorary master's degree in education at Middlebury College. In 1933 she received an honorary doctorate in education at Norwich University; it was the first honorary doctorate bestowed on a woman at that military institution.

== Career ==
Woodruff taught as a young woman, and was principal of Castleton Teachers' College from 1921 to 1940, including during the 1924 fire that burned the school's main building. She was co-principal of the Green Mountain School for Girls, and from 1937 to 1938 served as president of the National Education Association. She was the first woman to serve as president of the Vermont State Teachers Association, and was president of the New England Teacher Training Association. She retired in 1940.

Woodruff published a book of poetry, My Trust and Other Verse (1925). She also wrote articles for professional journals, including the Journal of Education.

== Personal life ==
Woodruff died in 1949, aged 82 years, in Castleton, Vermont. Woodruff Hall, a main building at Castleton University, is named for her. Castleton University also presents a Caroline Woodruff Award as "the highest honor that a student leader can achieve".
