= Matthew Hill (Vermont politician) =

American politician and member of the Vermont State House of Representatives

Member of the Vermont House of Representatives from the Lamoille-2 District
- In office 2017–2021
- Succeeded by: Kate Donnally

Personal details
- Born: Johnson, Vermont
- Party: Democrat (2017-2024)
- Education: Johnson State College (BA)

Matthew Hill is an American politician who has served in the Vermont House of Representatives from 2017 to 2021. He served on the Commerce and Economic Development committee his first 3 years. In his fourth year, he served on the House Natural Resources Committee. Hill did not seek re-election in 2022.

In 2024, a different Matt Hill ran under the Libertarian party and announced his run for senate against incumbent Bernie Sanders. This Matt Hill is a different person than the Matt Hill who served in the House of Representatives form 2017–2021.
