= Nick Gregory =

American television meteorologist

- Born: April 24, 1960 (age 65); New Rochelle, New York, U.S.
- Education: Lyndon State College (BS)
- Occupation: Meteorologist
- Employer: WNYW

Nick Gregory (born April 24, 1960) is an American meteorologist and pilot. He is the chief meteorologist for WNYW in New York City. His first weather forecast for WNYW aired on December 26, 1986.

== Early life ==
A native of New Rochelle, New York, Gregory is a 1978 graduate of Iona Preparatory School in New Rochelle, and a 1982 graduate of Lyndon State College in Lyndonville, Vermont. Gregory holds a bachelor's degree in meteorology.

== Career ==
Gregory has been a licensed pilot for 42 years and a flight instructor for over 30 years.His extensive knowledge makes him the FOX 5 News aviation expert on aviation stories. He also flies missions for Angel Flight, a non-profit organization that provides free transportation for financially needy patients and families to and from their medical treatments. Before joining FOX 5 News, Gregory served as the morning meteorologist for CNN in Atlanta, Georgia. Prior to CNN, he worked as meteorologist for WTLV 12 (ABC) in Jacksonville, Florida. On December 26, 2016, Nick Gregory celebrated his 30th anniversary on Fox 5 News.

Gregory has also been heard on several radio stations. He was the meteorologist for WCNN Newsradio in Atlanta from 1984 to 1986. In New York he was a part of the morning show on WQHT Hot 97 from 1988 through 1993 then joined the morning show on WLTW 106.7 Lite FM from September 1995 through December 2008.

As a flight instructor, he is the chief pilot for Performance Flight, which utilizes the Cirrus SR20 and SR22 aircraft for its fleet. The flight school is located at Westchester County Airport in White Plains, New York. Gregory is also an FAA Designated Pilot Examiner which authorizes him to give the practical test on behalf of the FAA for those looking to earn their Private Pilot or Commercial Certificate as well as attain an Instrument Rating. Most recently he has been hired as a pilot by Hopscotch Air, which provides air taxi services throughout the northeast.

== Awards ==
Gregory has been honored with several awards over the course of his career. He has been on the American Meteorologist Society's "Board of Broadcast Meteorology" and was chairman of the board in 1992. He has received the AMS Seal of Approval for Excellence in Television Weathercasting and both the New York Post and the New York Daily News have named him the most accurate weather forecaster in New York City. He participates in many charities and is also very involved in the community visiting schools all across the tri-state area. In recognition of this, Gregory has been awarded the New York City Comptrollers Award for outstanding community service.

== Personal life ==
Gregory is married, has three children and resides in New Rochelle, New York. Gregory is of Greek descent and attends Holy Trinity Greek Orthodox church in New Rochelle, New York.
