= Jim DeRose =

American soccer player and coach

Personal information
- Date of birth: September 28, 1967 (age 59)
- Place of birth: Cinnaminson Township, New Jersey, United States
- Position: Goalkeeper

Youth career
- 1985–1988: Johnson State College

Senior career*
Years	Team	Apps	(Gls)
1990	New Mexico Chiles		

Managerial career
- 1990: Johnson State Badgers (assistant)
- 1991: Vermont Catamounts (assistant)
- 1992–1994: Illinois State Redbirds (assistant)
- 1995: Richmond Spiders (assistant)
- 1996–2023: Bradley Braves
- * Club domestic league appearances and goals

Jim DeRose (born c. 1967 in Cinnaminson Township, New Jersey) is an American former soccer player and coach who spent most of this managerial career at Bradley University. He also spent one professional season as a goalkeeper with the New Mexico Chiles in the American Professional Soccer League.

== Player ==
DeRose attended Johnson State College, playing on the men's soccer team from 1985 to 1988. He was an NAIA first team All American and the New England Player of the Year in 1988. He graduated in 1989 with a bachelor's degree in secondary education. In 1990, DeRose spent one season with the New Mexico Chiles of the American Professional Soccer League. The Chiles lasted only one season before folding. During this time, soccer in the United States was experiencing great turbulence. Teams and leagues lasted a few years at the most before collapsing. Consequently, DeRose decided to pursue other opportunities in the sport.

== Coach ==
DeRose began his coaching career as an assistant soccer coach at Johnson State College in 1989. He returned to coaching as an assistant at the University of Vermont in 1991. In 1992, he moved to Illinois State University where he was an assistant until the school dropped the men's soccer program in 1994. He spent a single season as an assistant at the University of Richmond before being hired as the head coach at Bradley University in 1996. In 2007, he was named the Soccer America Magazine Coach of the Year.

DeRose was honored as the Greater Peoria Tri-County Male Coach of the Year in 1998.

At the end of the 2023 NCAA Division I men's soccer season, DeRose retired.
