= Raymond J. McNulty =

American educator

Raymond McNulty

Vermont Commissioner of Education
- In office 2001–2003
- Succeeded by: Richard Cate

Personal details
- Education: Bridgewater State University (BA); Johnson State College (MA)

Raymond J. McNulty is an American educator who served as Vermont Commissioner of Education from 2001 to 2003.

== Education ==
McNulty earned a B.A. from Bridgewater State University in 1973 and an M.A. from Johnson State College in 1977.

== Career ==
McNulty had been an educator for 28 years before assuming office as Vermont Commissioner of Education. In 2002, Marlboro College awarded McNulty an honorary doctorate.

Since leaving government, McNulty has served as chief learning officer at Penn Foster College, Dean of the School of Education at Southern New Hampshire University, and is currently president of the International Center for Leadership in Education. McNulty was also a senior fellow at the Bill & Melinda Gates Foundation. He began an earlier association with the foundation while still serving as Vermont Commissioner of Education. McNulty was succeeded by Richard Cate.
