= Vermont State University =

Public university in Vermont, U.S.

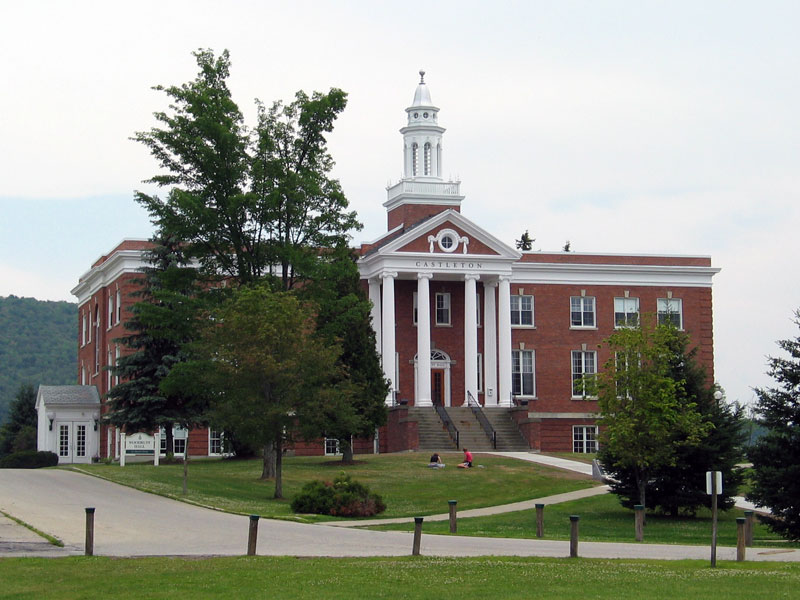
- Woodruff Hall at the Castleton campus
- Type: Public university
- Established: July 1, 2023; 3 years ago
- Accreditation: NECHE
- President: Sherry Kollmann
- Academic staff: 205 FT/ 310 PT
- Students: 4,775
- Undergraduates: 4,003
- Postgraduates: 772
- Location: Castleton, Johnson, Lyndon, Randolph, and Williston, Vermont, United States
- Campus: Multiple sites
- Colors: Amaranth and cyan
- Website: vermontstate.edu

Vermont State University (Vermont State or VTSU) is a public university in Vermont.

Vermont State University operates residential campuses in five communities: Castleton, Johnson, Lyndon, Randolph, and Williston. VTSU also operates nine smaller learning sites around the state as well as out-of-state locations in Alaska, New Hampshire, and Wisconsin. It is accredited by the New England Commission of Higher Education (NECHE).

== History ==
Castleton University was chartered as the Rutland County Grammar School in 1787, making it the oldest Vermont State University campus. Vermont Technical College was founded in 1806 as Orange County Grammar School; Johnson Academy was founded in 1828, later becoming Johnson State College; Lyndon State College was founded in 1911 as a normal school.

The Vermont General Assembly created the Vermont State Colleges System in 1961, creating a "loose confederation" of colleges that also included the Community College of Vermont after its founding in 1970, but never included the University of Vermont. Beginning in 1977, the Vermont State Colleges adopted a more centralized model, with its trustees overseeing the operations of all its constituent schools. This began to reverse somewhat beginning in 2000, when the system allowed more autonomy for the schools while still encouraging cooperation, including uniform course numbering so students could take courses from the other institutions.

In 2018, financial challenges led to the merger of Johnson State College and Lyndon State College, creating Northern Vermont University. In 2020, continuing budgetary constraints led Vermont State Colleges Chancellor Jeb Spaulding to propose closing Northern Vermont University, closing Vermont Technical College's Randolph campus, and laying off almost 500 employees. Additionally, the Vermont State Colleges would require an emergency infusion of $25 million, regardless of Spaulding's proposed closures. Spaulding withdrew the proposal amid fierce opposition and the state appropriated additional funds to keep all campuses and colleges operating, but lawmakers asked VSC to come up with a way to fix its financial situation. VSC formed a committee that ultimately recommended merging all three of the system's four-year colleges into a single institution with multiple campuses. While the committee did not recommend including the Community College of Vermont in the merger, it did recommend that it focus more on workforce education and adult learning. The proposal was projected to save the system $25 million over five years. Students, faculty, and staff protested these planned changes, leading VSC to change aspects of its merger plan.

In July 2023, Castleton University, Northern Vermont University, and Vermont Technical College merged to form Vermont State University. The combined institution included the roughly 5,500 students at its three predecessor institutions. Interim President Mike Smith announced an initiative in September 2023 to "examine our list of academic offerings" and consider combining or closing additional degree programs.

== Academics ==
Undergraduate demographics as of fall 2023
Race and ethnicity	Total
White	78%
Hispanic	5%
Black	4%
Unknown	4%
International student	3%
Two or more races	3%
Asian	2%
Economic diversity
Low-income (Note: The percentage of students who received an income-based federal Pell grant intended for low-income students.)	36%
Affluent (Note: The percentage of students who are a part of the American middle class at the bare minimum.)	64%

Vermont State University offers associate, bachelor's, and master's degrees. The Castleton, Johnson, and Lyndon campuses offer liberal arts education while the Randolph and Williston locations house technical programs. Students have the option to take online courses as well as hybrid courses from other campuses.

== Campuses ==
=== Castleton ===
The 165-acre campus is residential and is located in the heart of Castleton Village. The Castleton Medical College Building, built in 1818, is the oldest building on campus.

=== Johnson ===
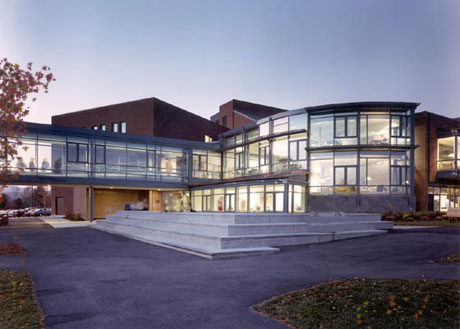
Library and Learning Center at the Johnson campus

The Johnson campus is 350 acres and includes the Dibden Center for the Arts and the Julian Scott Memorial Gallery. Nearby Babcock Nature Preserve is a 1,000-acre forest owned and maintained by Johnson for scientific and educational study.

=== Lyndon ===
The 195-acre Lyndon campus in Lyndonville, Vermont features the three-story Samuel Read Hall Library. Other sites on campus include News 7, a daily live broadcast studio; the Stannard Gymnasium; and four residence halls.

=== Randolph ===
The campus in Randolph is the largest of the five at 544 acres and hosts engineering labs and an advanced manufacturing center. The campus has received United States Department of Defense funding to establish the first advanced manufacturing education, research, and development facility in the state.

=== Williston ===
The suburban Williston campus, located just outside Burlington, houses several labs and a small residential building.

== Leadership ==
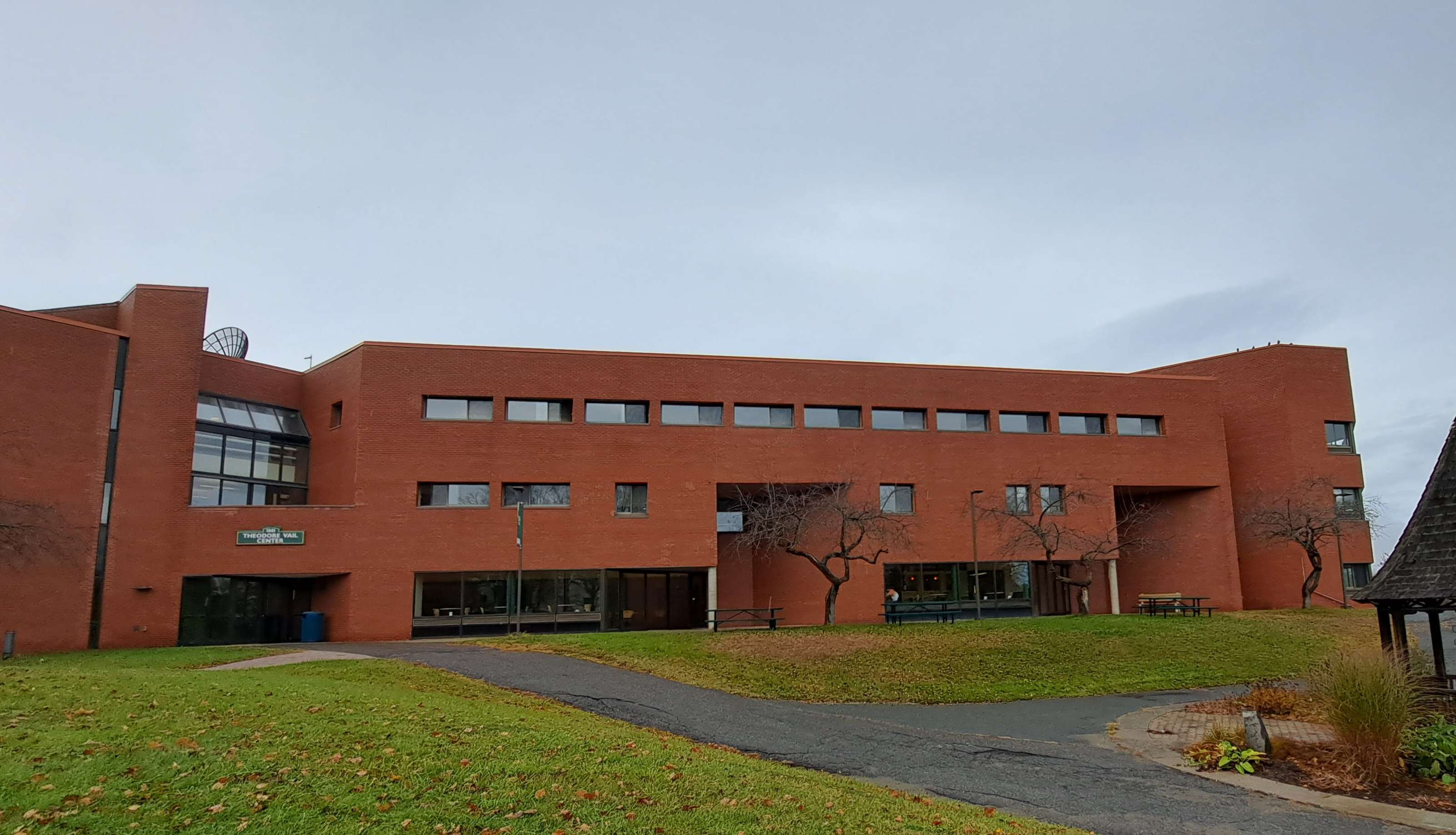
The Theodore N. Vail Center at the Lyndon campus

Parwinder Grewal was appointed as the university's president in 2022. However, Grewal resigned abruptly in April 2023 before the university opened officially. His resignation followed a vote of no confidence by the faculty, who also voted no confidence in the Vermont State College's chancellor, chief administrative officer, and its entire board of trustees.

Grewal was replaced by Mike Smith, who previously served as interim president at Burlington College and was the state's Secretary of Human Services during the COVID-19 pandemic.

On September 22, 2023, David Bergh, a former administrator at Johnson State College and the final president at the former Cazenovia College in New York, was selected as the college's next interim president. Immediately after Bergh's rise to the interim president position at the beginning of November 2023, the student government associations at the Castleton, Randolph, Johnson, and Lyndon campuses submitted a vote of no confidence regarding staff and faculty terminations proposed by the university's administrators. In August 2024, Bergh's contract was extended through June 2026. Bergh announced in May 2025 that he would step down when his contract expires in 2026.

In March 2026, Vermont State University appointed Sherry Kollmann, a New Mexico State University administrator, president of the institution.

== Athletics ==
Vermont State University has the former Northern Vermont University (Johnson Badgers and Lyndon Hornets), Castleton University, and Vermont Technical College athletics teams. Owing to the university's unique composition from a series of formerly independent colleges, four of its five campuses have their own athletics programs. Students are able to participate in athletics based on their campus, with some campuses competing against each other in athletic conferences.

=== Castleton Spartans ===
The Castleton campus offers a wide variety of sports, including football, alpine skiing, baseball, basketball, ice hockey, lacrosse, soccer, track and field, volleyball, and wrestling. They currently compete in NCAA Division III in the Little East Conference.

=== Johnson Badgers ===
Johnson teams participate as a member of the NCAA Division III. The Badgers are a member of the North Atlantic Conference (NAC).

In 2018, women's triathlon was added to the varsity sports roster, representing the only NCAA institution in New England to carry women's triathlon as a varsity sport.

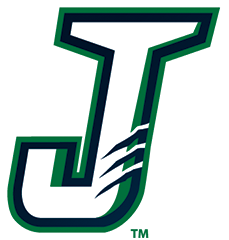
Johnson Badgers monogram

Men's sports	Women's sports
Basketball	Basketball
Golf	Soccer
Soccer	Softball
Tennis	Tennis
Track and field^{1}	Track and field^{1}
Volleyball	Volleyball
^{1} includes both indoor and outdoor.

=== Lyndon Hornets ===
The Lyndon Hornets are a member of the NCAA, and compete on the Division III level in the North Atlantic Conference. Lyndon teams include:

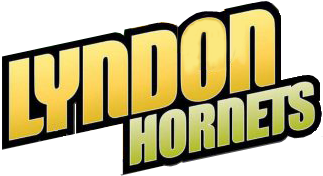
Lyndon Hornets wordmark

Men's sports	Women's sports
Baseball	Basketball
Basketball	Cross country
Cross country	Lacrosse
Lacrosse	Soccer
Soccer	Softball
Tennis	Tennis
	Volleyball

=== Randolph Knights ===
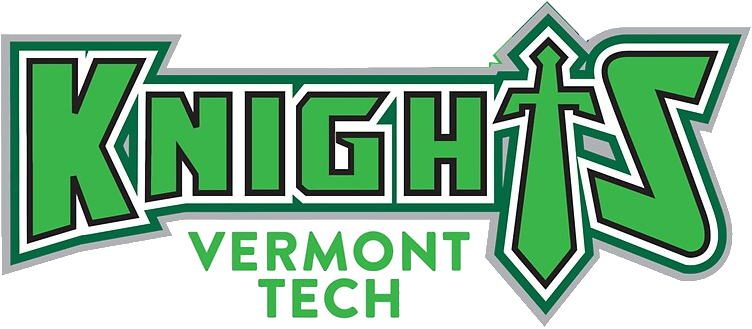
Randolph Knights wordmark

The Vermont State–Randolph athletic teams are called the Knights. The college is a member of the United States Collegiate Athletic Association (USCAA), primarily competing in the Yankee Small College Conference (YSCC) since the 2011–12 academic year. The Knights previously competed in the Sunrise Athletic Conference of the National Association of Intercollegiate Athletics (NAIA) from 2006–07 to 2010–11.

The Vermont State–Randolph Knights continue to play as of 2023.

Men's sports	Women's sports
Basketball	Basketball
Cross country	Cross country
Soccer	Soccer
Track and field	Track and field
	Volleyball
