= Vermont State Colleges =

Public university system in Vermont

Vermont State Colleges System
- Motto: Scientia est Lux Lucis
- Motto in English: Knowledge is Enlightenment
- Type: Public Liberal Arts and Sciences
- Established: 1961
- Chancellor: Elizabeth Mauch
- Students: 11,060
- Location: Montpelier, Vermont, United States
- Website: www.vsc.edu

Vermont State Colleges Locations

The Vermont State Colleges System (VSCS) is the system of public colleges in the U.S. state of Vermont. It was created by act of the Vermont General Assembly in 1961. There are presently two entities in the VSCS consortium, the Community College of Vermont and the Vermont State University. Together, more than 11,000 students are enrolled in the constituent colleges.

== History ==
While VSCS, the state colleges' governing organization, was created in the mid-20th century, most of the component colleges are older. The state legislature first chartered Castleton University as a grammar school in 1787. Johnson State College was founded in 1828. The Vermont Technical College was founded in 1866. Lyndon State College was founded in 1911. Community College of Vermont, founded in 1970, was founded after the creation of the VSC. Northern Vermont University, was created in 2018 by merging Johnson State College and Lyndon State College together, combining administration but keeping the campuses separate.

For many years, the Vermont public colleges have experienced financial stress and chronic underfunding. Exacerbated by COVID-19, in April 2020, then Vermont State Colleges system Chancellor Jeb Spaulding recommended closing the Vermont Technical College residential campus in Randolph as well as both campuses of Northern Vermont University. This proposal was withdrawn and the state provided emergency "bridge" funding to the system in fall 2020.

With the funding, the state put the system on a five-year plan to eliminate the system's structural deficit, unify Castleton University, Northern Vermont University, and Vermont Technical College into one university while keeping current campus locations open, and consolidate administrative services across the system. The Vermont State Colleges System Board of Trustees endorsed the plan in February 2021 and announced in September 2021 that the institutions would unify under the name Vermont State University on July 1, 2023.

== Demographics ==
Over eighty percent of VSCS students come from the state of Vermont. Students come from over forty other U.S. states, and more than forty-five countries. Class sizes are small, the average faculty to student ratio across the five colleges is 1:16. Nearly ninety percent of the faculty hold a Ph.D. or equivalent doctorate level terminal degree in their field of instruction.

== Organization ==
The Council of Presidents is the executive leadership body for Vermont State Colleges and comprises a chancellor and executive staff of the VSCS and the presidents of the four member colleges. The council works with the Board of Trustees of the Vermont State Colleges to set policies and procedures for the system. Current members of the Council are VSCS Chancellor Jeb Spaulding; President Karen Scolforo, Castleton University, President Joyce Judy, Community College of Vermont; President Elaine C. Collins, Northern Vermont University; President Patricia Moulton, the Vermont Technical College; and VSC General Counsel William Reedy, Chief Financial Officer Thomas Robbins, Chief Academic Officer Annie Howell, and Director of Community Relations and Public Policy Dan Smith.

The Chancellor's office provides the chief executive function of the system and performs day to day financial and policy operations. It is headed by Chancellor Elizabeth Mauch, who took office in January 2024 and is the former president of Bethany College. The system is overseen by the fifteen-member Board of Trustees and each of the state colleges has its own president and deans.

The VSCS was headquartered at the Chancellor's Office in Waterbury until August 2011 when Tropical Storm Irene forced it to relocate temporarily. After one year of temporary location at the Vermont Tech Enterprise Center in Randolph, the Chancellor's Office found a new, permanent home in Montpelier.

=== Chancellors ===
1. Richard E. Bjork (1978–1984)
2. Charles I. Bunting (1984–1999)
3. Robert G. Clarke (1999–2009)
4. Timothy Donovan (2009–2015)
5. Jeb Spaulding (2015–2020)
6. Sophie Zdatny (2020–2023)
7. Elizabeth Mauch (2024–present)
