= Castleton University =

Public university in Castleton, Vermont, US

- Former name: List: Rutland County Grammar School (1787–1828); Vermont Classical High School (1828–1830); Castleton Seminary (1830–1876); State Normal School at Castleton (1867–1920); Castleton Normal School (1920–1947); Castleton Teachers College (1947–1962); Castleton State College (1962–2015); Castleton University (2015–2023)
- Successor: Vermont State University
- Type: Public university
- Active: 1787; 239 years ago–July 2023
- Accreditation: NECHE
- Academic affiliations: Vermont State Colleges
- Location: Castleton, Vermont, U.S. 43.607°N 73.180°W
- Campus: 165 acres (67 ha); Rural college town
- Colors: Castleton green, dark gray and white
- Nickname: Spartans
- Sporting affiliations: NCAA Division III – Little East Conference
- Mascot: Sparty
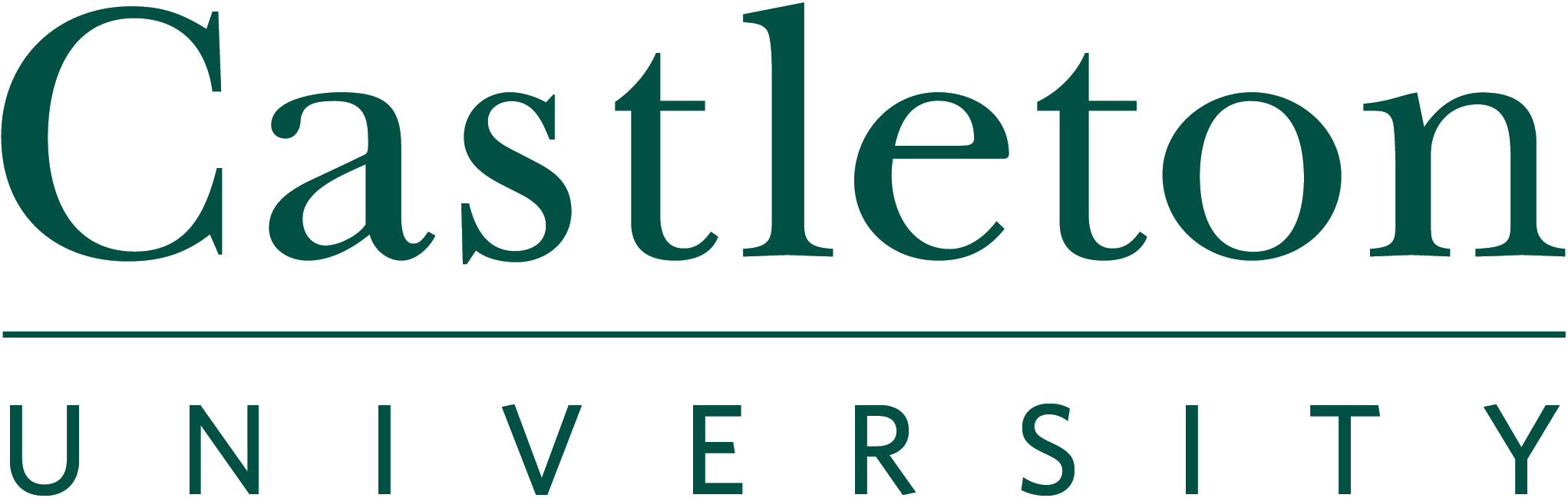

Castleton University was a public university in Castleton, Vermont, United States. In July 2023, Castleton University was dissolved and the campus was merged with Northern Vermont University and Vermont Technical College to form Vermont State University, of which it now serves as a branch campus. At the time of its closure, Castleton had an enrollment of 2000 students and offered more than 30 undergraduate programs, as well as master's degrees. It was accredited by the New England Commission of Higher Education.

== History ==
Castleton University traced its history to the Rutland County Grammar School chartered by the Vermont General Assembly on October 15, 1787. The Grammar School was a regional school, preparing young men for college through instruction in traditional academic subjects such as Latin and Greek. The institution frequently changed its name during the 19th century. At various times it was known as "Castleton Academy", "Castleton Academy and Female Seminary", "Vermont Classical High School" (1828–1830), and "Castleton Seminary" (1830–1876).

In 1947, the Normal School became "Castleton Teachers College". With increased enrollment from men, intercollegiate athletics began in the 1950s. In 1962, the institution became "Castleton State College" when it joined other state-supported colleges in becoming a part of the Vermont State Colleges, a consortium of colleges governed by a common board of trustees, chancellor, and Council of Presidents, each college having its own president and deans. In 1979, the board of trustees proposed a name change to "Southern Vermont State College"; the proposal was never acted on. On July 23, 2015, the Vermont State Colleges Board of Trustees voted unanimously to change the name of the institution to "Castleton University".

=== Early History ===
In 1823, instruction in "the solid branches of female education" began for "young Ladies and Misses". By the time of the Civil War, the majority of the students attending Castleton were young women.

In 1829, a three-story brick building costing US$30,000 was constructed on a small hill south of the village. Principal Solomon Foot (1826–1829), who would go on to be President pro tempore of the U.S. Senate during the Civil War, was the driving force in this expansion of the school. The Seminary Building (eventually known as the Old Seminary Building) was the most impressive structure in the village, but expensive to maintain and often too large for the school's struggling enrollment.

Castleton Medical College (1818–1862) was also located in the village. It graduated 1400 students, more than any other medical school in New England at the time. Although Castleton Medical College and Castleton Seminary were separate institutions, they often shared faculty. Today the former medical college building, known as the Old Chapel, is the oldest building on the campus.

The first female principal was Harriet Newell Haskell (1862–1867). She had attended the Seminary as a child, took classes at Middlebury College without being permitted to matriculate, and then attended Mount Holyoke Female Seminary, which was not yet a college but offered a college-level curriculum for women. Although Haskell was in her 20s when she served as principal, the school flourished under her administration. With her departure to be principal of Monticello Ladies Seminary in Godfrey, Illinois, Castleton Seminary went into decline.

=== From seminary to college ===
The school began its transition from seminary to college in 1867, when the "State Normal School at Castleton" was founded as one of three state normal schools chartered by Vermont. Normal schools educated students for teaching careers. For 30 years the Normal School property and grounds were privately owned by Abel E. Leavenworth and his son Philip. In 1912, the State of Vermont purchased the property, and the name of the school changed slightly to "Castleton Normal School" in 1920.

In the 1920s and 1930s, under the direction of Caroline S. Woodruff, the college experienced dramatic growth in students and its stature. Woodruff modernized the school's curriculum, incorporating the theories of Vermont educator-philosopher John Dewey, especially his precepts of "learning by doing" and "learning by teaching". She hired staff with advanced degrees, and broadened her students' exposure to the world by bringing people such as Helen Keller, Robert Frost, and Norman Rockwell to Castleton. Woodruff was the first and only Vermonter to become president of the National Education Association.

=== Closure ===
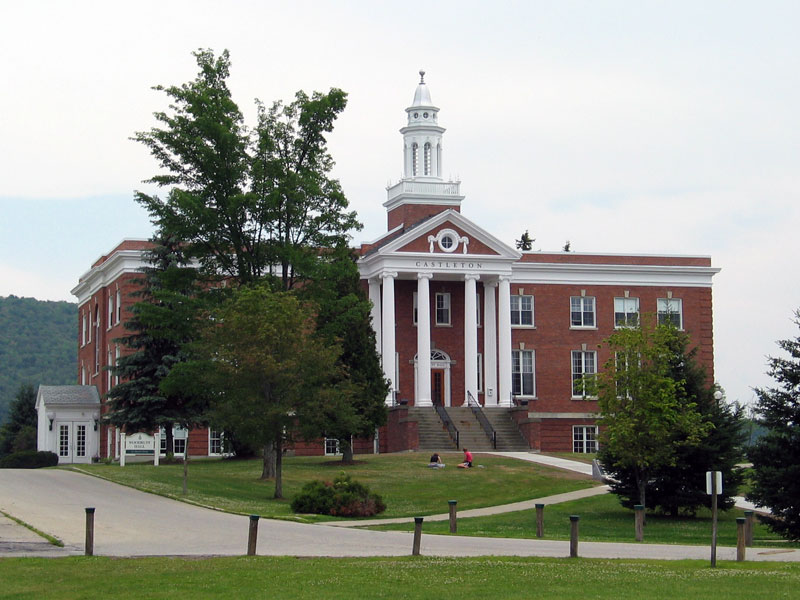
Woodruff Hall

By 2020 the Vermont State Colleges were in poor financial shape. That year, Vermont State Colleges Chancellor Jeb Spaulding proposed closing Northern Vermont University, closing Vermont Technical College's Randolph campus, and laying off almost 500 employees. Even with the proposal, Spaulding told trustees, the system needed an immediate infusion of $25 million to keep operating.

Spaulding withdrew the proposal amid fierce opposition and the state appropriated additional funds to keep all campuses and colleges operating, but lawmakers asked the colleges to come up with plan to address their financial situation. The Vermont State Colleges System formed a committee that recommended merging three of the system's four-year colleges into a single institution with multiple campuses. The proposal was projected to save the system $25 million over five years. The new, consolidated, "Vermont State University" opened in July, 2023 and Castleton as an independent academic institution ceased to exist.

== Athletics ==
The Castleton Spartans compete in 28 NCAA Division III varsity sports (14 men's 14 women's).

== Notable faculty and alumni ==
=== Notable faculty ===
- Pei-heng Chiang, professor of political science

=== Notable alumni ===
- Chad Bentz, baseball player
- Arthur P. Carpenter, US Marshal for Vermont
- William Carris, Vermont State Senator
- Barbara Crampton, actress
- John R. Edwards, member of the Vermont House of Representatives and US Marshal for Vermont
- Robby Kelley, Former U.S. Ski Team Member
- Scott La Rock, musician
- Kevin J. Mullin, member of the Vermont House of Representatives and Vermont Senate
- Hester Martha Poole (1833/34–1932), writer, artist, advocate
- Lyman W. Redington (1849–1925), attorney and politician
- Jarrod Sammis, Vermont state representative
- Twiddle, jam band

== See also ==
- Vermont State University, successor
- List of colleges and universities in Vermont
- Lists of American universities and colleges
