= Babcock Nature Preserve =

Nature preserve in Eden, Vermont, US

Coordinates: 44°44′48.3″N 72°36′11.1″W

The Babcock Nature Preserve is located in Eden, Vermont. The preserve comprises a 1,000-acre (1.4 km^{2}) tract of boreal forest land. The tract was donated to Vermont State Colleges by Robert and Anne Hanchett Babcock. Mr. Babcock was a Lieutenant Governor of Vermont, serving under Governor Robert Stafford. He was also the first provost of the Vermont State Colleges, and a member of the Vermont House of Representatives. The Preserve is maintained by nearby Northern Vermont University formerly Johnson State College for scientific and educational study. It is open to the public.
