= Rosemont College =

Catholic college in Rosemont, Pennsylvania, US

- Motto: Latin: Levavi oculos meos in montes
- Motto in English: I will lift my eyes up to the hills
- Type: Private university
- Established: 1921
- Religious affiliation: Roman Catholic (Society of the Holy Child Jesus)
- Academic affiliations: ACCU; MSA; NAICU; CIC
- President: Jim Cawley
- Students: 951
- Undergraduates: 512 (fall 2022)
- Postgraduates: 308 (fall 2022)
- Location: Rosemont, Pennsylvania, U.S. 40.0328°N 75.3270°W
- Campus: Suburban
- Colors: Maroon and gray
- Nickname: Ravens
- Sporting affiliations: NCAA Division III – UEC
- Mascot: Raven
- Website: rosemont.edu
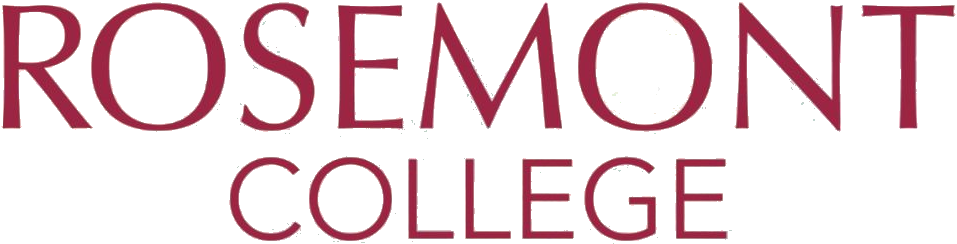

Rosemont College is a private Catholic university in Rosemont, Pennsylvania, United States, located on the Philadelphia Main Line. Founded in 1921 as a women's college by the Sisters of the Holy Child Jesus, the undergraduate program opened to male students beginning in fall 2009. The university is accredited by the Middle States Commission on Higher Education (MSCHE). Rosemont also offers a range of master's degrees through its school of graduate studies and school of professional studies. In March 2025, leadership of Rosemont College and Villanova University announced that Rosemont would merge into Villanova, serving as a secondary campus.

== History ==
The Society of the Holy Child Jesus founded Rosemont College in 1921 as an independent university in the Catholic tradition

One of the oldest Catholic women's colleges in the region, Rosemont originally "had a reputation for educating the daughters of more well-to-do Catholics." In the fall of 2009, the traditionally women's undergraduate college began accepting male students.

Rosemont's first chairman of the board was Cardinal Dougherty, who was instrumental in Rosemont gaining its first accreditation from the Middle States Association of Colleges and Secondary Schools by personally guaranteeing the college's financial solvency.

Bishop Fulton J. Sheen was likewise involved in the early life of the college, describing Rosemont as "the finest girls' college in the United States."

During World War II, Rosemont students aided the war effort by selling war bonds serving as air-raid wardens while the college hosted Villanova College's summer programs as Villanova's campus was in use during the summers by the United States Navy. However, Rosemont evolved over the course of the twentieth century; "As views on women changed, the original—what some would call convent—atmosphere gradually moved toward more freedom for students to come and go, later curfews, and greater interaction with college men."

In 1957, United States Senator John F. Kennedy visited Rosemont and spoke to students and faculty in Main Building, Rathalla.

In 1963, Rosemont students insisted that the college begin bringing non-Catholic speakers to campus, and by the early 1970s, the college ceased holding religious retreats due to lack of attendance.

On November 13, 2024, The Philadelphia Inquirer published a report on the financial health of 13 small Philadelphia-area colleges. Rosemont scored second-to-lowest on the report's financial health index. On March 31, 2025, Rosemont and Villanova University announced that Rosemont would merge with Villanova. The transition will begin in 2027 and be completed in 2028, after which the college will be known as "Villanova University, Rosemont Campus.

== Academics ==
The university is accredited by the Middle States Commission on Higher Education.

=== Undergraduate College ===
The traditional Undergraduate College confers Bachelor of Arts, Bachelor of Fine Arts, and Bachelor of Science degrees in twenty-five majors, as well as thirty-one minors, nine undergraduate education certification programs, and one premedical post baccalaureate certificate. It offers an 11:1 student to faculty ratio with an average class size of 13. Each program offers an in-depth study of a particular subject area, as well as a breadth of study in the liberal arts in addition to at least one internship, volunteer effort, or service learning opportunity.

==== Academic partnerships ====
Rosemont College has developed inter-institutional cooperative partnership agreements with Villanova University, Eastern University, Arcadia University, Cabrini College, Chestnut Hill College, Gwynedd Mercy University, Holy Family University, Immaculata University, and Neumann University. These agreements allow for cross-registration and the sharing of library resources between the institutions.

Rosemont also offers study abroad programs and internships.

==== Education ====
Rosemont offers teacher certification programs at the undergraduate and graduate level with a reported outcome of 100% job placement rate for undergraduate education graduates.

===== Medical school & health professions =====
Rosemont offers a seven-year BA/BS/MD Fast Track medical program with Drexel University College of Medicine in which students study for three years at Rosemont and after passing the required scores on the MCAT, move onto Drexel College of Medicine. The institution also offers an 8-year BA/BS/MD Early Assurance medical program. These programs report an outcome of a 95% acceptance to medical, nursing and osteopathic programs for qualified science graduates.

=== School of Professional Studies ===
The School Professional Studies is designed for working adults and offers online programs at both the undergraduate and graduate level. It offers accelerated degree programs, certificates, and corporate training. These programs are completed in five-week sessions, normally meeting once a week for four hours. The accelerated graduate courses are completed in seven-week sessions or over a weekend.

At the undergraduate level, there are nine online A.A., B.A., and B.S. Professional Studies degree options, and fifteen concentrations or credentials fully embedded within the degree. At the graduate level, there are eight online Professional Studies master's degree options and twelve online graduate certificates. Many of the School of Professional Studies master programs offer an online graduate certificate fully embedded within the online degree offering graduates multiple graduate credentials within a degree program.

=== School of Graduate Studies ===
The traditional School of Graduate Studies offers nine master's degree options, five post baccalaureate certifications, and one graduate certificate. Many Graduate Studies programs are offered exclusively on campus. The School of Graduate Studies also offers three hybrid online and on-campus programs, and five fully online master level education programs.

=== Writer's Studio ===
Rosemont also offers a number of non credit master classes, workshops and writer's retreats that are open to the public.

== Campus ==
Rosemont College is in the Rosemont census-designated place, and in Lower Merion Township.

Built in the University Gothic style, the 58-acre campus is located in the Main Line area of greater Philadelphia in the historic residential neighborhood of Rosemont. Unlike other local Catholic colleges, Rosemont rejected cloistered buildings and convent motifs in favor of a campus with "modestly-sized buildings arranged around a gentle rise in the landscape."

=== Connelly Hall ===
In May 1925, the cornerstone of Connelly Hall, named after the Society of the Holy Child Jesus foundress Cornelia Connelly, was laid and was built with a courtyard overlooking a large field which became known as Connelly Green. In 2006, Connelly Hall was modernized and expanded to 30,000 square feet.

=== Mayfield Hall ===
The current Mayfield Hall stands where the Sinnott family's stables once were. The stables were repurposed in 1921 to house a science lab, an art studio, and an auditorium. By 1929, there was a growing need for additional dormitory and dining space. To meet this demand, a plan was devised to retain the back portion and foundation of the stables, adding a new front and upper floors. The residence was named for Mayfield School, East Sussex, where Cornelia Connelly is buried. In 2021, the building underwent extensive renovations, re-opening in August 2022 after a $7.5 million restoration project. Parts of the original stables are still visible.

=== Gertrude Kistler Memorial Library ===
The Gertrude Kistler Memorial Library was founded in 1926 by Mr. & Mrs. Sedgwick Kistler in honor of their daughter, Gertrude. The library serves as a research center and hosts the college's archives.

In 2010, Kimmel Bogrette completed a major expansion of the library. As part of the renovation, "Eleanor's Café" was added, named in honor of Eleanor M. Weisbrod, who funded the library upgrade in memory of her sister, Sr. Helen Mary Weisbrod, SHCJ.

=== Immaculate Conception Chapel ===
The Immaculate Conception Chapel is one of only two chapels in the United States whose stained-glass windows depict only women, a project conceived by Rosemont's second president, Mother Mary Ignatius Carroll. The windows were crafted by Willet Stained Glass Studios, located in Germantown, PA. The sisters who helped select the saints carefully considered how each depiction would influence and inspire future students.

=== Main Building: Rathalla ===
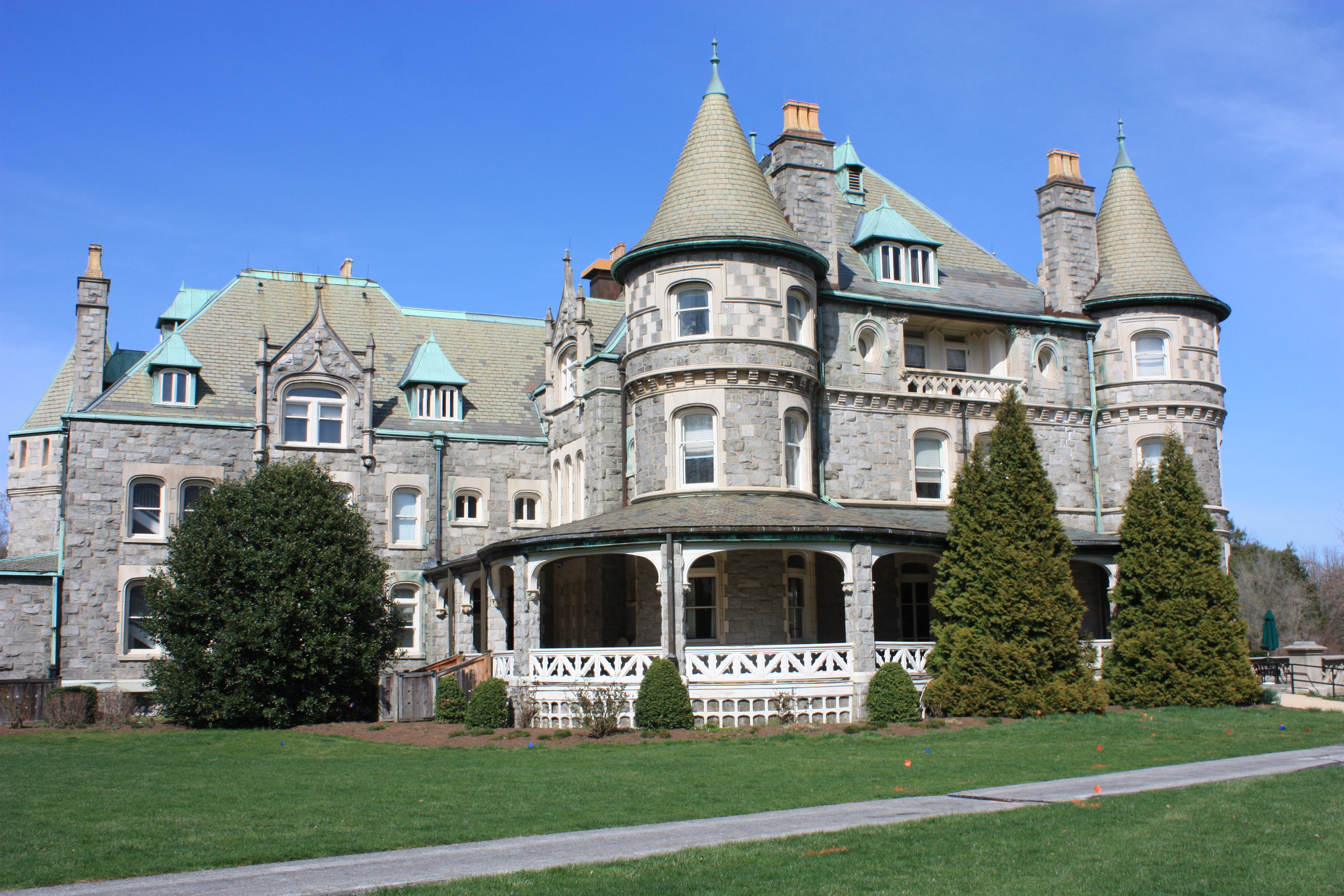
Joseph Sinnott Mansion, main building of Rosemont College

The Main Building, the Joseph Sinnott Mansion — also known as Rathalla ("home of the chieftain on the highest hill" in Gaelic) — served as the first classrooms and student housing for Holy Child College. It was originally built as a summer home for whiskey distiller Joseph F. Sinnott. Completed in 1891, the home was designed by architects Edward P. Hazlehurst and Samuel Huckel. The building was heavily influenced by the Gothic chateaux of the Loire Valley. In 1927, the Sisters of the Holy Child of Jesus acquired Rathalla for $1.00. The building was added to the National Register of Historic Places in 1980.

=== Rotwitt Theater & McShain/Brown Science Building ===
The McShain/Brown Science Building, named for John McShain and alum Dorothy McKenna Brown, was originally built in 1953. McShain's daughter, Sr. Pauline "Polly" McShain, SHCJ, graduated from Rosemont in 1958. The facilities were renovated in 2014. The renovations included upgrades to the mechanical and electrical systems, as well as a full modernization of the space.

In 2014, Rosemont College's McShain Performing Arts Center was renamed the Rotwitt Theater in recognition of the support from Jeffrey and Dianne Rotwitt.

=== Sharon Latchaw Hirsh Community Center ===
In 2019, Kimmel Bogrette completed the design and planning for a major renovation and expansion of Rosemont College's Cardinal Hall, which was renamed in honor of the college's outgoing president Sharon Latchaw Hirsch. Construction for the 75,000 square-foot facility cost $11 million. It features an indoor campus commons that serves as a gathering space for students, faculty, staff, and visitors.

== Athletics ==
Rosemont athletics wordmark

Rosemont, known athletically as the Ravens, is a Division III member of the National Collegiate Athletic Association (NCAA) and is a member of the United East Conference (UEC). Rosemont was a charter member of the Colonial States Athletic Conference (CSAC), which merged into the UEC in July 2023.

Men's sports include baseball, basketball, cross country, golf, lacrosse, soccer; tennis and outdoor track & field (in 2023–24); while women's sports include basketball, cross country, lacrosse, soccer, softball, tennis, golf, volleyball, outdoor track & field (in 2023–24) and lacrosse (in 2023–24). Rosemont's Athletic Complex is home to a fully gray synthetic turf multi-purpose field, the first all gray field in the United States. The baseball team played its first season during the institution's centennial.

== Notable alumnae ==
- Mari Carmen Aponte, United States Ambassador to El Salvador
- Virginia Samaras Bauer, 9/11 survivors activist
- Pat Ciarrocchi, news reporter
- Marion Donovan, inventor of the disposable diaper
- Linda Fiorentino, actress
- Patricia Kennedy Lawford, socialite and philanthropist
- Patricia McCormick, journalist and author
- Rosalind Russell, actress, winner of five Golden Globes and a Tony Award
- Claudine Schneider, former congressional representative from Rhode Island
