= Joseph Sinnott =

Joseph Sinnott may refer to:

- Joseph E. Sinnott (born c. 1966), mayor of Erie, Pennsylvania
- Joseph F. Sinnott (1837–1906), Irish businessman who emigrated to Pennsylvania
- Joseph J. Sinnott (1860-1943), Doorkeeper of the United States House of Representatives

== See also ==
- Joe Sinnott (1926–2020), American comic book artist
