= Virginia Bauer =

American politician

Executive Director of the New Jersey Lottery
- In office 2003–2004

Commissioner of the Port Authority of New York and New Jersey
- In office 2008–2012

Chief Executive Officer and Secretary of the New Jersey Commerce, Economic Growth and Tourism Commission
- In office 2004–2007

Member of the Executive Committee on the National 9/11 Memorial and Museum
- Incumbent
- Assumed office 2008

Director to the New Jersey Economic Development Authority
- Incumbent
- Assumed office 2020

Personal details
- Born: Virginia Samaras; 1956 (age 69–70) New Jersey

Virginia Samaras Bauer (born 1956) is an American advocate for families of the victims of the September 11 attacks and a government leader in New Jersey.

== Biography ==
The daughter of Peter J. and Virginia K. Samaras, Bauer was raised in Middletown Township, New Jersey, and Little Silver in Monmouth County, and graduated from Red Bank Catholic High School. Bauer lived in Rumson before moving to Red Bank. She graduated from Rosemont College in Rosemont, Pennsylvania and worked as an analyst for Merrill Lynch from 1978 to 1985,

Her first husband, W. David Bauer (1956–2001), was a bond trader for Cantor Fitzgerald and was killed in the collapse of the World Trade Center on September 11, 2001. Bauer, a mother of three to David, Stephen, and Jackie, became an advocate for 9/11 families, working to secure tax relief and other benefits from the federal government. Her advocacy work brought her into contact with New Jersey political leaders.

Bauer was appointed New Jersey Lottery Director in 2003 by former Gov. Jim McGreevey. In the summer of 2004, McGreevey appointed her as chief executive officer and secretary of the New Jersey Commerce, Economic Growth and Tourism Commission, a position she retained in the cabinet of former Gov. Richard Codey. On January 16, 2006, Governor Jon Corzine announced his intention to retain Bauer in his cabinet. In March 2007, Corzine announced his nomination of Bauer to serve as a commissioner of the Port Authority of New York and New Jersey, a part-time position running the bi-state transportation agency, which owns the World Trade Center site. She is the first 9/11 widow from New Jersey to be appointed to the Port Authority Board.

After being appointed to the Port Authority Board, Bauer announced that she was stepping down as Commerce Secretary as part of a planned restructuring of state economic development agencies by Corzine. After leaving Commerce, it was announced that she was becoming head of government relations for a major real estate developer in New Jersey. There had been speculation in the media that Corzine was considering Bauer as a running mate for lieutenant governor in the 2009 election. However, earlier in the year she moved into a new position with Covenant House as Senior Vice President for Development. She departed the role in 2010. later served on multiple boards (Newmark Group, Foundation Board of the Monmouth Medical Center, and Trustee of The Peddie School) while maintaining her position as Director of New Jersey's Economic Development Authority. She served as commissioner of the Port Authority until 2012.

Bauer later became CFO of a security technology company that develops and markets proprietary software. She served as Director of the Newmark Group, Inc. which is a publicly traded company operating a full service commercial real estate service business that offers a full time suite of services and products for owners and occupiers across the entire commercial real estate industry. In 2008, she became a member of the executive committee for the National 9/11 Memorial & Museum. She was appointed in 2020 by Governor Phil Murphy to serve as a director for the New Jersey Economic Development Authority.

== Personal life ==
Following her first marriage, Bauer married Donald A. Steckroth in October 2007. Her husband is a widower and a judge in the United States Bankruptcy Court.
