= Society of the Holy Child Jesus =

Catholic teaching order

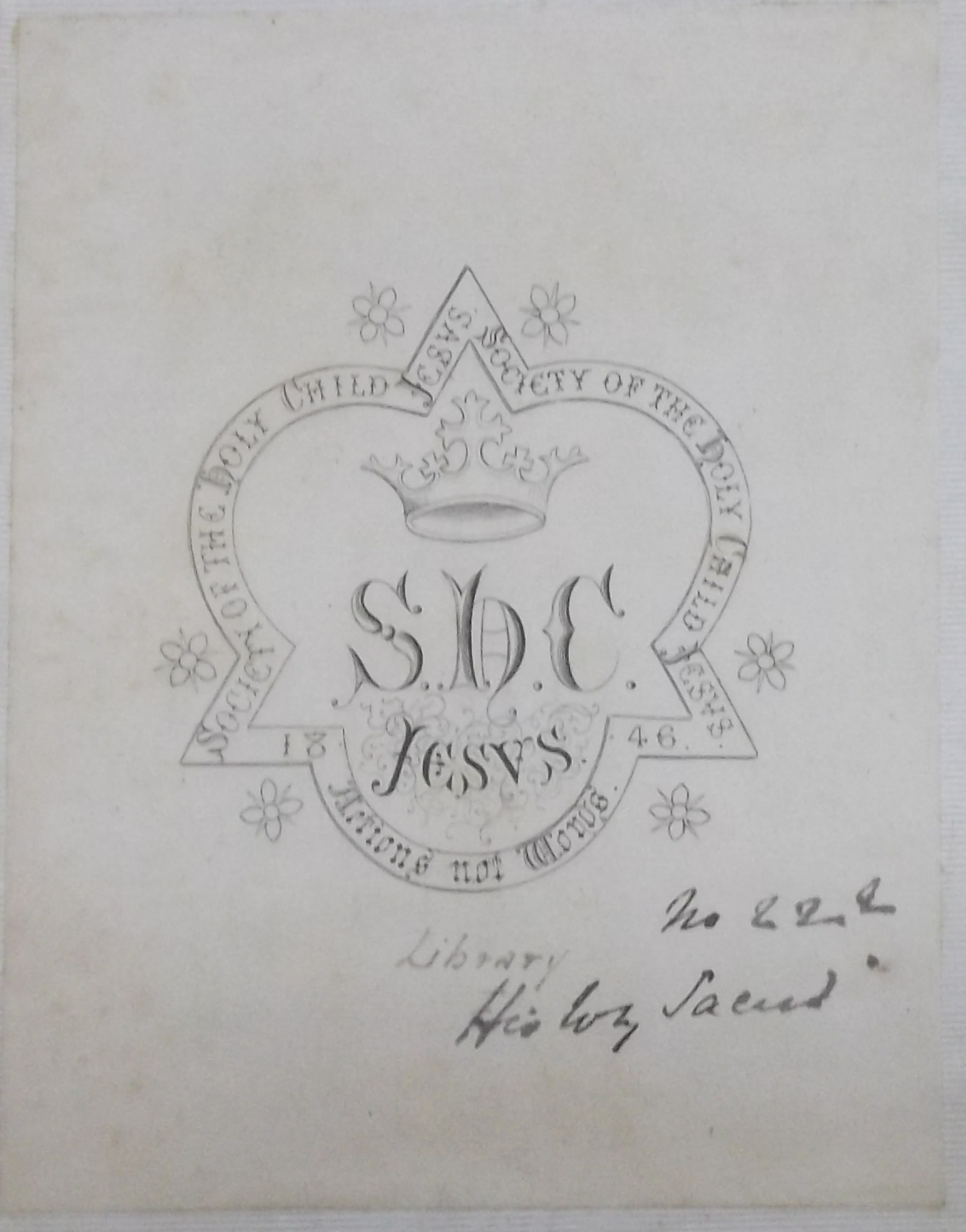
Ex-libris: Society of the Holy Child Jesus

The Society of the Holy Child Jesus is an international community of Catholic sisters founded in England in 1846 by Philadelphia-born Cornelia Connelly.

== History ==
Born Cornelia Peacock in Philadelphia, she was raised a Presbyterian. In 1831, she married Pierce Connelly, an Episcopal priest. They converted to Catholicism in 1835 and separated in 1844, when her husband decided to become a Catholic priest. Cornelia was invited to England to educate girls. There she drew up a set of rules for a new religious congregation, which she called the "Society of the Holy Child Jesus".

Bishop Nicholas Wiseman sent her to a convent at St Mary's Church, Derby, where she was soon running a day school for 200 students and training novices for her new institute. In December 1847, she took her perpetual vows as a religious sister and was formally installed as superior general of the society. In 1848, Wiseman, unable to meet expenses connected with the schools, had Cornelia relocate to his district at St. Leonard's-on-Sea in Sussex.

The Society was approved in 1887 by Pope Leo XIII, and the rules and constitutions were confirmed and ratified by him in 1893.

== Expansion ==
In 1862, six sisters from England came to the Society to the United States. In 1930, three sisters brought the Society to Nigeria, and in 1967 four sisters began the Society’s life in Chile.

== Schools ==
=== Americas ===
- St Edward the Confessor Philadelphia, Pennsylvania (1865-1993)
- St. Leonard’s School of the Holy Child, Philadelphia, Pennsylvania (closed in 1983 - was 1-12 until 1970, then 9-12)
- Connelly School of the Holy Child, Potomac, Maryland (6-12)
- Cornelia Connelly High School, Anaheim, California (closed in 2020)
- Holy Child Academy, Drexel Hill, Pennsylvania (K-8)
- Holy Child Academy, Old Westbury, New York (K-8)
- Mayfield Junior School, Pasadena, California (K-8)
- Mayfield Senior School, Pasadena, California (9-12)
- Oak Knoll School of the Holy Child, Summit, New Jersey (K-6)
- Rosemont School of the Holy Child, Rosemont, Pennsylvania (K-8)
- School of the Holy Child, Rye, New York
- Holy Child Academy, Sharon Hill, Pennsylvania (closed in 1973)
- Cornelia Connelly Center, New York, NY

=== England ===
- Combe Bank School, Sundridge, Kent
- St Leonards-Mayfield School, Mayfield, East Sussex
- Convent of the Holy Child Jesus (Layton Hill Convent), Blackpool, Lancashire (merged to become St Mary's Catholic College)
- Holy Child School, Edgbaston (re-named Priory School in 2001)
- Winckley Square Convent School, Preston, Lancashire, 1875–1978
- Slynedales Preparatory School, Lancaster, Lancashire, closed in 1966

=== Africa ===
- Holy Child School, Cape Coast, Ghana
- Holy Child College, Southwest-Ikoyi, Lagos

== Higher education ==
- Rosemont College, Rosemont, Pennsylvania (Originally the Joseph Sinnott Mansion).
- Holy Child College of Education, Takoradi, Ghana

== Bibliography ==
- The Life of Cornelia Connelly, 1809-1879, Foundress of the Society of the Holy Child Jesus (1924)
- Society of the Holy Child Jesus, 1846-1946 (Philadelphia, 1946)
- Mother Mary Cleophas of the Society of the Holy Child Jesus, president of Rosemont College, 1939-1946 (1950)
- Mary Dennis Lynch, A Bibliography of the Society of the Holy Child Jesus, 1846-1955 (1955)
- Mother Mary Amadeus (1881-1955), Sixth Superior General of the Society of the Holy Child Jesus: A Memoir (1959)
- God Alone: An Anthology of the Spiritual Writings of Cornelia Connelly, Foundress of the Society of the Holy Child Jesus (Templegate, 1960)
- Caritas McCarthy, The Spirituality of Cornelia Connelly: A Study of the Charism of the Founder of the Society of the Holy Child Jesus (Rosemont, 1981)
- Source: Studies in the Spirituality of the Society of the Holy Child Jesus (1994)
- Philomena Aidoo, "The Contribution of the Society of the Holy Child Jesus to Catholic Education in West Africa" in International Studies in Catholic Education (2016)
