= Ahmed Hassanein (American football) =

American football player (born 2002)

No. 99 – Detroit Lions
- Position: Defensive end
- Roster status: Active

Personal information
- Born: July 9, 2002 (age 24); Anaheim, California, U.S.
- Listed height: 6 ft 2 in (1.88 m)
- Listed weight: 275 lb (125 kg)

Career information
- High school: Loara (Anaheim)
- College: Boise State (2021–2024)
- NFL draft: 2025: 6th round, 196th overall pick

Career history
- Detroit Lions (2025–present)

Awards and highlights
- 2× First-team All-MW (2023, 2024)
- Stats at Pro Football Reference

Ahmed Hassanein (born July 9, 2002) is an Egyptian-American professional football defensive end for the Detroit Lions of the National Football League (NFL). He played college football for the Boise State Broncos and was selected by the Detroit Lions in the sixth round of the 2025 NFL draft.

== Early life ==
Hassanein was born in the United States and moved to Egypt at age six to live with his father in Cairo, where he participated in CrossFit, wrestling, boxing, and swimming. In 2018, he moved to Anaheim, California, to live with his brother, a football coach who convinced him to try the sport. "My brother saved me,” Hassanein later said. "I was in Egypt acting one way and my life and personality changed. I’ve been grinding and working. I'm blessed."

Hassanein attended Loara High School in Anaheim, where he was rated a three-star recruit. On December 16, 2020, he signed a National Letter of Intent to play college football for the Boise State Broncos.

== College career ==
In his first two collegiate seasons in 2021 and 2022, Hassanein appeared in 21 games and notched 18 tackles with two being for a loss, two sacks, and a forced fumble. He had a breakout season in 2023, notching 53 tackles with 17 being for a loss, 12.5 sacks, and two forced fumbles for the Broncos. Hassanein was named first-team All-Mountain West Conference for 2023. Heading into the 2024 season, he was named one of the Broncos team captains. In week two of the 2024 season, Hassanein tallied a sack against Oregon. In his final collegiate game, the 2024 Fiesta Bowl in the quarterfinals of the College Football Playoffs, Hassanein made a sack and six tackles (three for loss). He finished the year with 48 total tackles, 16 tackles for loss, and 9.5 sacks, and was named first-team All-Mountain West Conference again for his senior season. On January 6, 2025, Hassanein declared for the 2025 NFL draft.

=== College statistics ===
Year	Team	Games		Tackles				Fumbles				Interceptions			
Year	Team	GP	Cmb	Solo	Ast	TFL	Sck	FF	FR	Yds	TD	Int	Yds	TD	PD
2021	Boise State	9	5	4	1	0	0.0	0	0	0	0	0	0	0	0
2022	Boise State	12	13	7	6	2	2.0	1	0	0	0	0	0	0	0
2023	Boise State	14	53	30	23	17	12.5	2	0	0	0	0	0	0	0
2024	Boise State	14	48	28	20	16	9.5	0	1	0	0	0	0	0	0
Career		49	119	69	50	35	24.0	3	1	0	0	0	0	0	0

== Professional career ==
Pre-draft measurables
Height	Weight	Arm length	Hand span	Wingspan	40-yard dash	10-yard split	20-yard split	20-yard shuttle	Three-cone drill	Vertical jump	Broad jump	Bench press
6 ft 2 3/8 in (1.89 m)	267 lb (121 kg)	32 1/4 in (0.82 m)	9 in (0.23 m)	6 ft 6 3/4 in (2.00 m)	4.77 s	1.70 s	2.80 s	4.48 s	7.19 s	32.5 in (0.83 m)	9 ft 5 in (2.87 m)	32 reps
All values from NFL Combine/Pro Day

Hassanein was selected 196th overall in the sixth round of the 2025 NFL draft by the Detroit Lions. He was waived with an injury settlement on August 26. Hassanein was re-signed to the practice squad on November 10. He signed a reserve/future contract with Detroit on January 5, 2026.

== Personal life ==
Hassanein converted from Islam to Christianity while attending Boise State University. He has credited his coach, Spencer Danielson, with introducing him to the faith. Hassanein's sister is activist and journalist Gigi Ibrahim.

Hassanein is the first player of Egyptian heritage ever selected in the NFL draft.
