= Mary Charles Walker =

English religious sister, teacher and missionary (1881–1966)

Sister Mary Charles Walker RSC

Personal life
- Born: Margaret Mary Angela Walker; 16 March 1881 Brighton, Sussex, England
- Died: 27 February 1966 (aged 84) Chikuni, Northern Rhodesia (now Zambia)
- Education: St Mary's College, 1912

Religious life
- Religion: Catholic
- Institute: Religious Sisters of Charity
- Profession: 26 May 1904

Sr. Mary Charles Magdalen Walker RSC (née Margaret Mary Angela Walker; 16 March 1881 – 27 February 1966), was an English religious sister, teacher, missionary and founder of the Handmaids of the Holy Child Jesus in Calabar.

== Early life ==
Walker was born Margaret Mary Angela Walker on 16 March 1881 in Brighton, Sussex to Col Edward Walker, an Army Colonel, and Mary Josephine Walker (née Woodhead). The fifth of six siblings, Walker was raised in a Catholic household and was educated at Mayfield School.

On 21 November 1901, Walker entered the Dublin congregation of the Religious Sisters of Charity (RSC) with the intention of serving a mission. Taking the name "Sister Mary Charles" at her reception on 19 May 1902, Walker professed on 26 May 1904. By the time of Walker's profession the RSC was no longer a missionary congregation, having severed ties with its former Australian congregation.

== Career ==
Following her profession, Walker's first assignment was as a teacher in Dublin at St. James's Primary School. During this period Walker studied teaching at St Mary's College in Dublin, graduating with honours in 1912. (Note: Walker is also cited as attending Jesuit-run pedagogy courses.) Walker was subsequently transferred to St Vincent's Convent School in Cork in July 1912, and to a school in Foxford, County Mayo in September 1915. In 1914, Bishop Joseph Shanahan appealed to the superior general, Mother Agnes Gertrude, for a foundation to be founded in southern Nigeria. In a response to a circular letter written by Mother Agnes Gertrude about such a foundation, Walker was one of the first to volunteer for a mission. Whilst in Foxford, Walker authored The Catechism Notes which was subsequently used in schools across Ireland, Australia, England and Wales. During this period Walker befriended Mother Mary Arsenius, to whom she confided her aspiration to serve a mission in Africa.

From August 1920 to April 1921, Walker taught at Ravenswell Primary School in Bray. Walker published her second work Caritas Christi Urget Nos in 1922. On 11th June 1923, Walker received permission from Pope Pius XI to live outside her congregation and to work with Bishop Shanahan in Calabar in Colonial Nigeria. Arriving in Calabar on 3 October 1923, Walker's primary apostolate was providing education. On 15 January 1931, Walker founded The Congregation of the Handmaids of the Holy Child Jesus in Calabar.

In 1956, Walker was sent to Chikuni, Northern Rhodesia (present-day, Zambia) to take charge of the formation of the African Sisters, the Handmaids of the Blessed Virgin Mary.

== Legacy ==
The playwright James Ene Henshaw wrote A song to Mary Charles (Irish Sister of Charity): A play in five acts in 1984. A centenary celebration marking Walker's arrival in Nigeria was held on 18 November 2023 by the Handmaids of the Holy Child Jesus.

== Bibliography ==
- The Catechism Notes.
- Caritas Christi Urget Nos. Superior General Mother Agnes Gertrude. 1922.
