= Joseph Sinnott Mansion =

Historic house in Pennsylvania, United States

- U.S. National Register of Historic Places
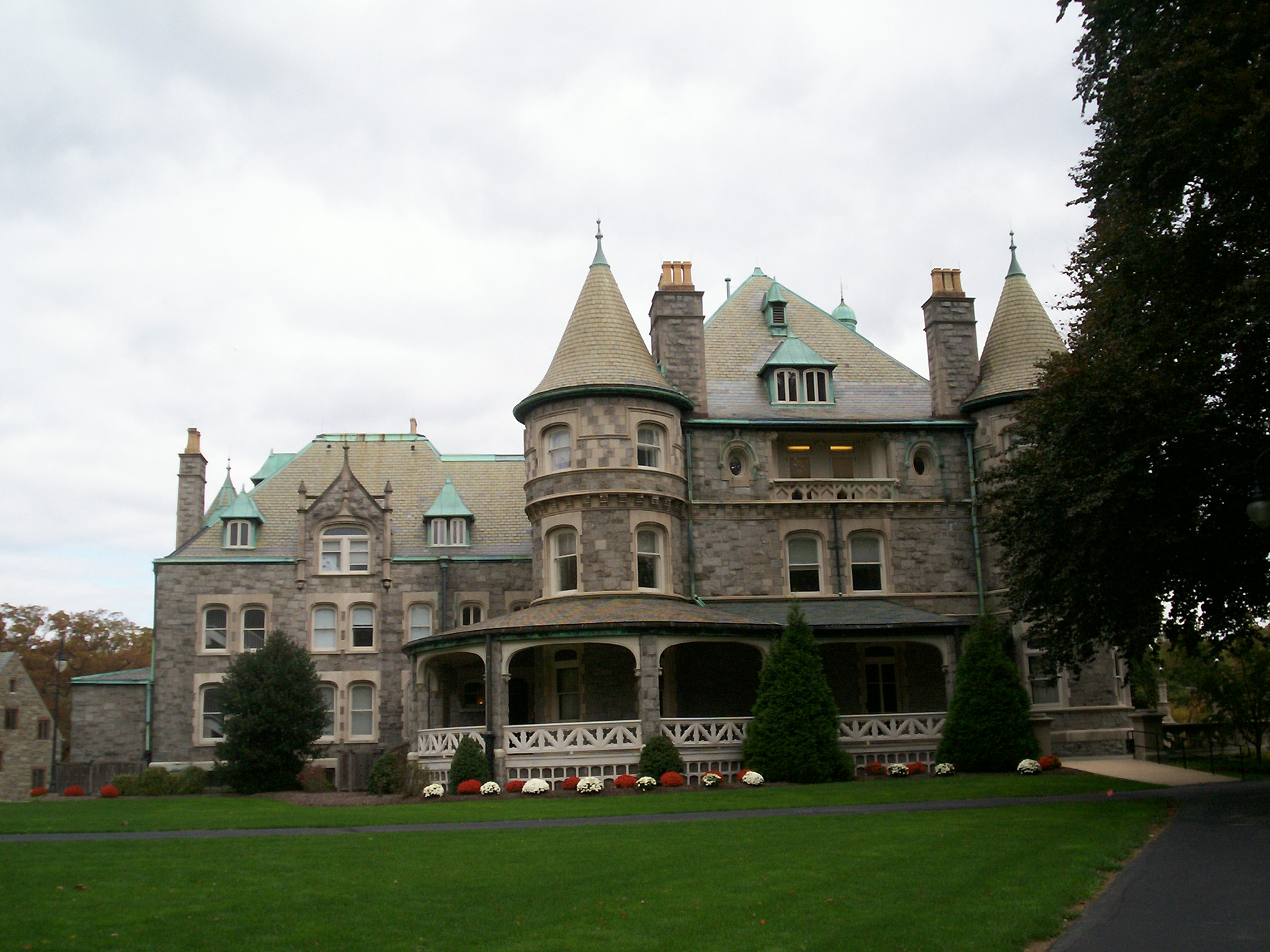
- Main Building at Rosemont College in December 2006

- Location within Pennsylvania Location within the United States
- Location: Montgomery and Wendover Aves., Rosemont, Pennsylvania, U.S.
- Coordinates: 40°2′0″N 75°19′46″W
- Area: 0.8 acres (0.32 ha)
- Built: 1889-1891
- Architect: Samuel Huckel Jr.
- Architectural style: Renaissance, Chateauesque
- NRHP reference No.: 80003582
- Added to NRHP: August 29, 1980

The Joseph Sinnott Mansion, also known in Gaelic as "Rathalla," meaning "home of the chieftain on the highest hill" is the Main Building at Rosemont College. The historic home is located on the campus in Rosemont, Pennsylvania, which was originally a part of the Ashbridge estate, and was called 'Rosemont Farm'.

== History and architectural features ==
In 1889, Joseph F. Sinnott, a Whiskey distiller, purchased forty acres of land, and built his summer home there between 1889 and 1891. Designed by Hazlehurst & Huckel, its construction cost $150,000. Edward Hazelhurst and Samuel Huckel were both fellows of the American Institute of Architects

Rathalla is a 2 1/2-story, thirty-two-room, 27,712 sq ft (2,574.5 m^{2}) stone building that sits on a brick foundation and was designed in a Renaissance Revival/Châteauesque style.

This mansion features a high, steep-sided, slate covered hipped roof, six decorated chimneys, numerous dormer windows, turrets, and stone carvings including gargoyles. The exterior of the home is laden with fifty-two carved limestone images. The stained glass window above the staircase features the Sinnott family's coat of arms, containing the motto "Ama Deum et Serva Mandata". This crest consists of a black swan above a striped wreath, with a gold crown around its neck and an arrow piercing its heart. Beneath this swan is a coat of arms with three more black swan. The motto is written on a scroll that drapes beneath the images. Hazelhurst and Huckel built the mansion in the style of the Loire Valley homes in France. This style was in vogue at the time, as high-end clients such as the Vanderbilts in New York also fashioned their mansions in a chateaux style during the same decade.

The property was purchased for $250,000 by the Sisters, Society of the Holy Child of Jesus (SHCJ) in 1921 and later sold for $1 to Rosemont College in 1927.

As the Main Building of Rosemont College, Rathalla has hosted notable visitors, including 35th United States President John F. Kennedy in 1953, whose sister, Patricia, graduated from Rosemont College during the 1940s, and 46th United States President Joseph R. Biden Jr. as the 1974 commencement speaker. Both presidents, Biden and Kennedy were United States senators when they visited Rosemont and Rathalla. Archbishop Fulton J. Sheen was a frequent visitor of Rathalla and Rosemont College and spoke at more than thirty graduation ceremonies.

Rathalla was added to the National Register of Historic Places in 1980. Rathalla is said to have historic significance because it embodies the era in which it was built.

The Main Building at Rosemont College can be seen in the films The Sterling Chase and Tenure, as filming took place on the college's campus.

In 1999, the college updated the mechanical systems in the building. New wiring, heating and air conditioning, modern plumbing, an elevator, chair lift, and a handicapped accessible bedroom were all added. The construction company, Pancoast and Clifford Inc., was awarded the "Best Restoration/ Renovation Award" which is given annually by the Associated Builders and Contractors, Inc. in recognition of the renovation.
