= Cornelia Connelly =

American nun and educator (1809–1879)

Venerable Cornelia Connelly SHCJ
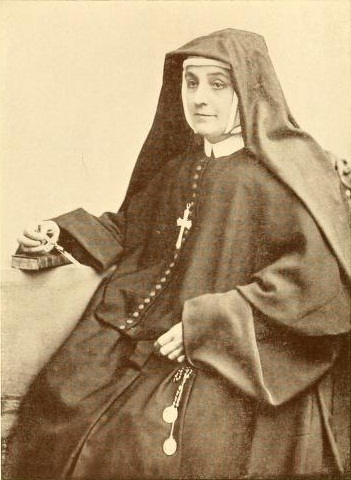
- Mother Cornelia Connelly, c. 1877

Personal life
- Born: Cornelia Augusta Peacock; 15 January 1809 Philadelphia, Pennsylvania, US
- Died: 18 April 1879 (aged 70) St Leonards-on-Sea, Sussex, England
- Spouse: Pierce Connelly (m. 1831; sep. 1844)
- Children: 5, including Pierce Francis Connelly

Religious life
- Religion: Catholic

Cornelia Augusta Connelly SHCJ (née Peacock; January 15, 1809 – April 18, 1879) was an American Roman Catholic nun, educational reformer and founder of the Society of the Holy Child Jesus. In 1846, she founded the first of many Holy Child schools in England. In 1992, Connelly was proclaimed as venerable by Pope John Paul II.

== Early life and family ==
Connelly was born Cornelia Augusta Peacock on January 15, 1809 in Philadelphia, Pennsylvania to Ralph Peacock (c. 1767–1818), an English-born merchant and land speculator, and Mary Peacock (née Swope, formerly Bowen; 1768–1823), who was of German descent. The youngest of six surviving siblings, Peacock had two older half-siblings from her mother's first marriage to John Bowen, an English sugar planter in the Colony of Jamaica. Raised as a Presbyterian by her father, he died when she was 9 years old.

Later orphaned following the death her mother in 1823, she was adopted by her elder half-sister Isabella Montgomery (née Bowen), who had married into a wealthy Episcopalian family. Peacock was subsequently educated at home by tutors. Baptized into the Episcopalian church in 1831, Peacock married the same year to the recently ordained Episcopalian minister Pierce Connelly on December 1. The couple moved immediately to Natchez, Mississippi where Pierce had been appointed the rector of Trinity Parish. The couple's five children were born between 1832 and 1840, of which only two survived to adulthood including the sculptor Pierce Francis Connelly.

=== Slavery ===
Following the birth of the couple's first child Mercer in 1832, they were gifted by their close friend, Dr. William Mercer, two of his slaves: Phoebe Grayson and her daughter, Sarah Goff. The family also owned five other enslaved persons: Jenny and Abraham and Phoebe's grandchildren, George, Mary, and James Henry.

== Religious life ==
=== Conversion to Catholicism ===
In 1835, the Catholic population of the United States started increasing from a large wave of German and Irish immigration. In many cities, it triggered a backlash of Protestant fear and resentment. In Boston, Massachusetts, in 1834, a convent for a community of Ursuline nuns was burned down by a Protestant mob. Pierce became curious about Catholicism. He started wondering why a Catholic mission for African-Americans across the Cumberland River had become so successful while an Episcopal mission there had failed. He also wanted to see more discipline and authority in a church than that provided by the Episcopalians.

In 1835, Pierce was appointed chairman of the Episcopal Convention of the Southwest. Pierce became wealthy from land investments and was in line for an appointment as an Episcopal bishop. In September 1835, Pierce resigned as rector of Trinity Episcopal Church. According to Peacock, he wanted time to study Catholic beliefs and practices. He traveled to St. Louis, Missouri, to share his spiritual concerns with Joseph Rosati, the Catholic bishop of the Diocese of St. Louis. After returning from Missouri, Pierce was ready to become a Catholic. Cornelia expressed her support for him, saying, "I am ready to submit to whatever he believes to be the path of duty."

Pierce decided that the family should travel to Rome for his conversion. They went to New Orleans, Louisiana, to await passage to Europe. While in New Orleans, Cornelia decided to convert to Catholicism there. Her ceremony held in New Orleans, presided over by Bishop Antoine Blanc of the Diocese of New Orleans.

After arriving in Rome, Pierce became a celebrity, having been a prominent figure in the American Episcopal Church. The family resided in the palazzo of the English Catholic John Talbot, 16th Earl of Shrewsbury. Pope Gregory XVI granted Pierce a private audience. He was received into the Catholic Church in March 1836.

=== Desire for priesthood ===
Following his conversion, Pierce wanted to be ordained as a priest. However, the Latin Church required its priests to be celibate and he was married, with another child expected soon. Some church advisors suggested he be ordained in one of the Eastern Catholic Churches, which did not require priestly celibacy. However, there were no Eastern Catholic parishes in the United States. In addition, Pierce wanted to become a bishop one day and celibacy was required for Eastern Catholic bishops.

Putting aside a decision on Pierce's priesthood, the family traveled to Vienna in the Austrian Empire, where their third child John Henry was born. However, the Panic of 1837 had hit Nashville, causing Pierce to lose a great deal of money. He was forced to bring the family back to the United States so he could get a job. He took a teaching position at the Jesuit St. Charles College in Grand Coteau, Louisiana, where he taught English. Cornelia taught music at a local academy for girls. In the summer of 1839, the Connellys' fourth child, Mary Magdalen, died six weeks after birth. In February 1840, John Henry died from burns after falling into a vat of boiling sugar. In early 1840, Cornelia made her first retreat of three days.

=== Family break-up ===
In late 1840, Pierce told Cornelia that he definitely wanted to become a Catholic priest. She knew that this decision would result in their separation for life and a breakup of the family. She begged him to reconsider it. In the meantime, the couple agreed to a period of celibacy. The Connellys' fifth child, Frank, was born in the spring of 1841. Bishop Blanc, now a family friend, advised Pierce not to enter the priesthood.

Pierce sold their home in Louisiana in 1842 and traveled to England with Mercer. Cornelia stayed in Grand Couteau with Adeline and Frank. In 1843, Gregory XVI told Pierce to bring the entire family to Rome to discuss their marital situation with Vatican officials. The Connellys moved into a large apartment near the Palazzo Borghese in that city.

=== Life after separation ===
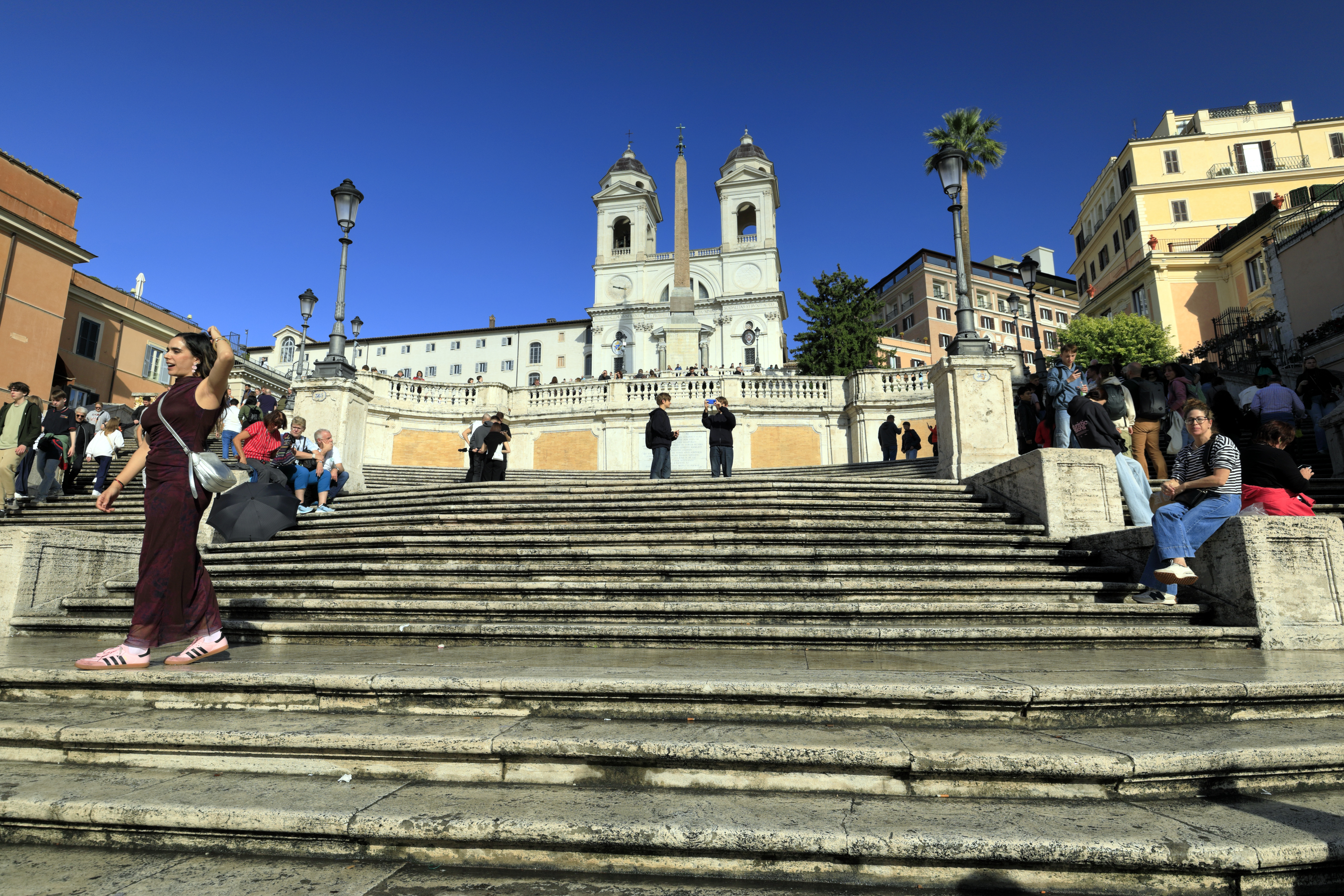
Trinità dei Monti Church and the Spanish Steps (2025)

After Gregory XVI received Cornelia's consent to Pierce's ordination, he gave it his permission. Cornelia moved with Frank into a retreat house at the Sacred Heart Convent at the Trinità dei Monti Church in Rome, operated by the Religious of the Sacred Heart. Adeline was sent to the Trinità dei Monti school, where her mother taught English and music at the church school. The Vatican allowed Pierce to visit Cornelia and the children once a week

Before Pierce took his major orders to become a priest, Cornelia pleaded with him one last time to change his mind, but to no avail. In keeping with the requirements of canon law, Cornelia pronounced a vow of perpetual chastity, releasing her husband for ordination. However, the cardinal vicar of Rome assured her that she was under no obligation to become a religious sister. In June 1844, Pierce was ordained into the Catholic priesthood. He celebrated his first mass, giving Adeline her first holy communion. During the service, Cornelia sang in the choir.

== Establishment of Society of the Holy Child Jesus ==
By the early 1840s, the British Government had started easing centuries-old restrictions on Catholic institutions in that nation. Bishop Nicholas Wiseman, the Vatican representative to Great Britain, quickly started establishing religious orders there to operate Catholic schools and other institutions.

Wiseman invited Cornelia to set up a women's religious order in England. Pierce, now serving in England as a chaplain to Lord Shrewsbury, assisted in her initiative. However, Wiseman was worried about a public scandal of a Catholic priest visiting his wife, a religious sister. He ordered Pierce to only communicate with Camelia by mail and required that Frank and Adeline go to boarding schools.

Deeply saddened by her children leaving home, Cornelia agreed with Wiseman's terms. She then drew up a constitution for a new religious congregation, which she called the Society of the Holy Child Jesus. Its constitution was based on the Jesuit constitution and devolved on operating schools.

Wiseman assigned Cornelia to a large convent at St. Mary's Parish in Derby in 1846. Soon she was running a day school for 200 pupils, an evening school for female factory workers, and a popular Sunday school program. At the same time, she was training novices for the new Society of the Holy Child Jesus.

== Later years ==
=== Attempts at control by Pierce ===
After a few years as a Catholic priest, Pierce was beginning to regret his ordination and his forced separation from Cornelia. After not seeing her for a year, disregarding Wiseman's orders, Pierce appeared unannounced at Derby to see her. She was upset with his visit and told him not to come again. He wrote Cornelia a letter, reproaching her for her hostility. She replied, expressing her bitterness over his hypocrisy. She stated that his visit made it harder for her to overcome her feelings of physical attraction for him.

In December 1847, Cornelia took her perpetual vows as a religious sister and was installed as superior general of the Society of the Holy Child Jesus. Despite her taking the vows, Pierce was still obsessed with maintaining control over Cornelia. In January 1848, he removed all three children from their schools in England without telling Cornelia. He put Frank in an undisclosed home in England and took Mercer and Adeline with him to Europe. His hope was that Cornelia would miss the children so much that she would abandon the Society and join him. She chose to remain in Derby.

Pierce then went to Rome and presented himself to the Congregation for the Propagation of the Faith as the true founder of the Society of the Holy Child Jesus, again hoping to gain control over Cornelia. Once she learned about his scheme, she was able to thwart it. However, he remained registered as the society's co-founder, which caused considerable confusion in the future. Returning to England, Pierce arrived at the convent in Derby with a supposed gift from Pope Pius IX. However, she refused to see him unless he agreed to return Adeline.

=== St. Leonard's-on-Sea ===
Wiseman, unable to meet expenses connected with the schools in Derby, moved Cornelia and her religious sisters to his district at St. Leonard's-on-Sea in Sussex. Once there, Cornelia established the Convent of the Holy Child Jesus School. She insisted on maintaining day schools for those who could afford tuition, as well as free schools for those who could not. She introduced Greek and Latin writers in translation for her brightest female pupils – courses that were otherwise reserved for male pupils.

Amidst the Darwinian revolution in England, Cornelia had her pupils learn geology. She encouraged them to experiment in art, music, and drama, even to dance waltzes and polkas, as well as playing whist. Her attitude towards discipline was unusual in that a school to her was meant to be home, with the religious sisters acting as mothers who loved, trusted and respected their pupils. Disliking the customary convent rules of constant surveillance, she encouraged mutual trust and respect for different talents.

=== Connelly vs. Connelly ===
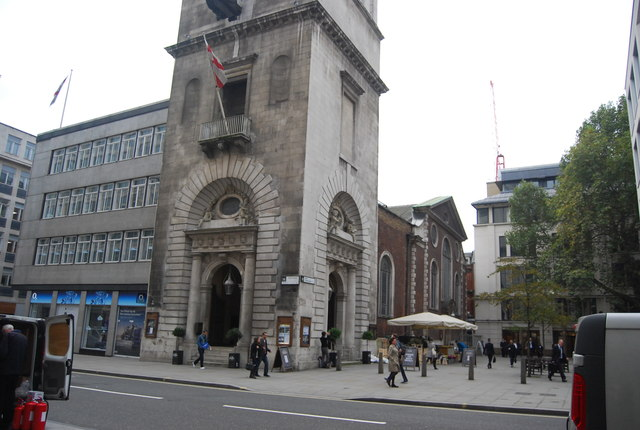
Arches Court at Church of St Mary le Bow, London (2014)

By 1849, a disgruntled Pierce had renounced his ordination and left the Catholic Church. That same year, he sued Cornelia in the Arches Court, the ecclesiastic court for the Church of England parishes around London. Over the next four years, this lawsuit became a high publicized and divisive trial in England. At the beginning of the case, Lord Shrewsbury asked Cornelia to leave England to avoid scandalizing the Catholic Church, which had only recently recovered its legal rights in the kingdom. She refused to leave, believing that would betray her vows and her religious order. Wiseman supported her decision to fight the lawsuit and provided lawyers for her defense.

In court, Pierce portrayed himself as a husband suffering the loss of his conjugal rights because the Catholic Church was illegally keeping his wife from him. At no point in the trial did he mention being a Catholic priest or having converted to Catholicism. Pierce said that Cornelia should be "compelled by law to return and render him conjugal rights". Cornelia's lawyers responded by telling court about Pierce's conversion and priesthood. In 1850, the Arches Court ruled that Cornelia's obligation and vows to the Catholic Church were not valid in England since Roman law was not valid there. Cornelia had to return to Pierce or face imprisonment.

Cornelia's lawyers immediately appealed the case to the Judicial Committee of the Privy Council, the court of appeals for the Arches Court. The case had received heavy coverage in the tabloid papers and popular opinion favored Pierce. In November 1850, on Guy Fawkes Day, anti-Catholic activists organized a march in support of Pierce, carrying effigies of Wiseman and Cornelia through the Chelsea section of London. Protestant ministers denounced Cornelia and Wiseman in Sunday sermons.

In 1851, the Judicial Committee overturned the Arches Court judgement against Cornelia. She was allowed to stay with her religious order and not return to Pierce. The Committee also ordered Pierce to pay both sides' legal costs. However, Pierce retained full custody of the children. Cornelia could not regain custody of any of her children since, under British law, children were the husband's property.

=== Aftermath of court case ===
After the case finished, Pierce sent Mercer to live with an uncle in the United States, never to see Cornelia again. He died from yellow fever in 1852 in New Orleans. Pierce took Adeline and Frank to Europe. Adeline remained with Pierce. Frank settled in Rome as an adult, where he became a recognized painter. Devoted to his mother, he blamed the Catholic Church for ruining his family. Pierce spent the rest of his life writing articles condemning the Catholic Church and Wiseman. Living with her sorrows, Cornelia stated that the Society of the Holy Child was "founded on a breaking heart".

Over the next 27 years, the Society of the Holy Child Jesus established convents and schools throughout England and Europe. In 1862, Cornelia sent six sisters to establish their first convent and school in Towanda, Pennsylvania. As the order increased in size in the United States, they moved to other states. The religious sisters trained female teachers, taught in schools themselves and helped with whatever needed to be done in their areas.

Cornelia Connelly died at age 70 on April 18, 1879, at St Leonards-on-Sea. At her request, she was buried there.

== Beatification process ==
In 1992, the Catholic Church proclaimed Cornelia as venerable.

== Legacy ==
As of 2026, the Sisters of the Holy Child Jesus are active in 14 countries on four continents. They are engaged in education and related spiritual and pastoral ministriesCornelia Connelly High School in Anaheim, California, was established in 1961 by the Sisters of the Society of the Holy Child Jesus. It closed in 2019.
