= Cornelia Connelly High School =

Cornelia Connelly School

Location
- 2323 West Broadway; Anaheim, (Orange County), California 92804; United States; 33°49′46″N 117°57′51″W

Information
- Type: Private, All-Female
- Motto: Lead, Serve, Inspire
- Religious affiliation: Roman Catholic
- Patron saint: Cornelia Connelly
- Established: 1961
- Founder: Sisters of the Society of the Holy Child Jesus
- Closed: 2020
- Superintendent: Greg Dhuyvetter
- Head of school: Jacqueline Sienkowski
- Campus Minister: Cathy Townsend
- Teaching staff: 16.6 (on an FTE basis)
- Grades: 9-12
- Enrollment: 163 (2015-2016)
- Average class size: 15
- Colors: Maroon and white
- Athletics conference: San Joaquin League
- Team name: Koalas
- Accreditation: Western Association of Schools and Colleges WCEA, CAIS
- Tuition: $15,900 (2019–2020)
- Affiliation: Holy Child Network of Schools
- Website: connellyschoolanaheim.org

Cornelia Connelly School of the Holy Child Jesus (Connelly) was a Catholic college-preparatory high school for girls in Anaheim, California, the only such independent school in the Roman Catholic Diocese of Orange. It operated from 1961 to 2020.

At the time of its closure, Connelly enrolled 124 girls, and was accredited to the Western Association of Schools and Colleges and Western Catholic Educational Association among others.

== History ==
The school was established in 1961 by the Sisters of the Society of the Holy Child Jesus, and named after Cornelia Connelly, founder of that Roman Catholic religious institute. It was one of thirteen Holy Child schools in the world, and through the Holy Child Exchange Program, students could spend part of their school year at other Holy Child schools in the U.S., England, Ireland, or Ghana.

Connelly's Board of Trustees voted in October 2019 to close the school permanently at the end of the 2019–20 academic year, citing "years of diminishing enrollment, increased debt, and shortfalls in fundraising efforts."

== Notable alumnae ==
- Nancy Barry '67 - Founder and President of Women's World Banking
- Gihan Ibrahim '05 - Egyptian citizen journalist and revolutionary socialist
- Casey Johnson '08 - Swimmer for the US at the 2004 Summer Paralympics, winning the bronze medal in freestyle relay; swimmer for the US at the 2008 Summer Paralympics
- Mary Kay Letourneau - teacher convicted of raping her 12-year-old student.
