= Pierce Francis Connelly =

American sculptor (1841–1932)

Pierce Francis Connelly (1841, Grand Coteau, Louisiana – 1932, Rome, Kingdom of Italy) was an American sculptor active in England, Italy, New Zealand and the United States. A student of Hiram Powers, Connelly was the son of Pierce Connelly and Cornelia Connelly.
