= Gigi Ibrahim =

Egyptian-American activist and citizen journalist

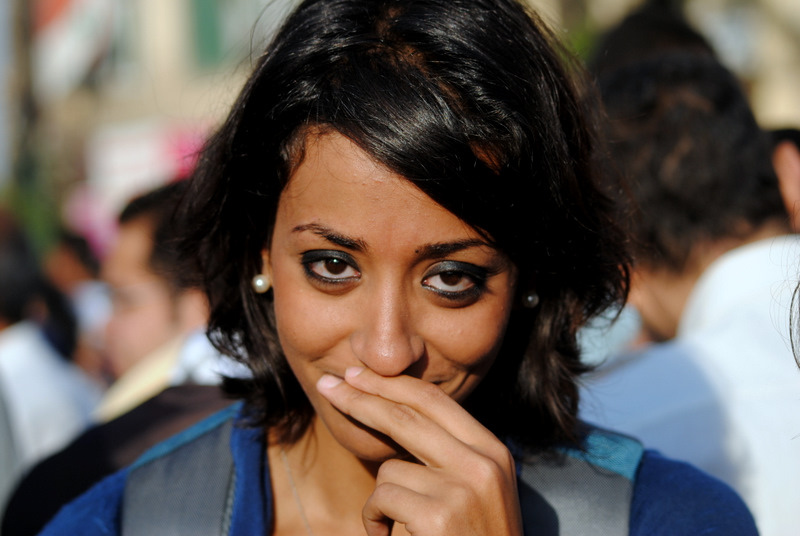
- Ibrahim in 2011
- Born: December 2, 1986 (age 39); Long Beach, California, U.S.
- Education: The American University in Cairo
- Occupations: Citizen journalist; activist
- Relatives: Ahmed Hassanein (brother)

Gigi Ibrahim (also mentioned as Gihan Ibrahim, born December 2, 1986) is an Egyptian-American citizen journalist and activist. During the Egyptian revolution in 2011, she reported events about the protests and became a face of the events for much of the Western media.

Ibrahim was born in Long Beach, California to Egyptian parents although she soon moved to Egypt, where she lived until she was 14. Her family subsequently returned to California, where she began attending a local Catholic high school. She graduated from high school in 2005, attending Orange Coast College at first before transferring to The American University in Cairo in 2008. She became involved with the Revolutionary Socialists organization and graduated in 2010 with a degree in political science.

Ibrahim became an organizer of the protests in 2011 and used Twitter to document events that took place during the revolution. Her tweets additionally helped human rights groups to document arrests and state violence during the revolution. Western news media treated her as a face of the revolution. After the 2013 coup d'état, Ibrahim chose to stay in Egypt and continue her involvement in activism and protests. She later co-founded a shoe manufacturing company in Cairo. Her younger brother is Ahmed Hassanein, an American football player for the Detroit Lions.

== Early life and education ==
Ibrahim was born in Long Beach, California to Egyptian parents in 1986. When she was a year old, the family moved back to Egypt. After her mother died, she went back to California with her father and sister in 2001; she was 14 at the time. She enrolled in a local Catholic school as a freshman.

While Ibrahim was in her second week of classes at the school, the September 11 attacks occurred. The next day, Federal Bureau of Investigation agents searched the Ibrahims' home, explaining that a neighbor had called a tipline to report the family. The neighbor's concerns were the fact that Ibrahim's uncle sometimes walked outside at night while speaking Arabic on phone calls, and a U-Haul truck had recently been parked outside their house. As the only Muslim in her class, Ibrahim was also asked to give a presentation about Islam at her school despite the fact that her family was not very religious. The experience led Ibrahim to realize that her life was going to be different because she was Muslim and Egyptian.

Over the years that followed, Ibrahim gained an increasing level of interest in politics. She became involved in a group that advocated for the rights of illegal immigrants to the United States in response to what she saw as discriminatory enforcement of immigration law by local police officers, and was also involved in pro-Palestinian activism. However, she was largely unaware of political events in Egypt at the time, and visited Egypt only rarely.

Ibrahim graduated Cornelia Connelly High School in 2005, and then attended Orange Coast College. She transferred to The American University in Cairo in 2008 at the age of 22, where she became involved in the local politics of Egypt and participated in protests throughout 2009 and 2010. During this time, she became involved with the Revolutionary Socialists, of which she is a member. She graduated in 2010 with a degree in political science.

== Involvement in Egyptian politics ==
We coordinated the timing, place and the content of the demands ... We started with 100 people, then we became thousands and thousands of people chanting against the regime

— Ibrahim in the UNESCO Courier, 2011

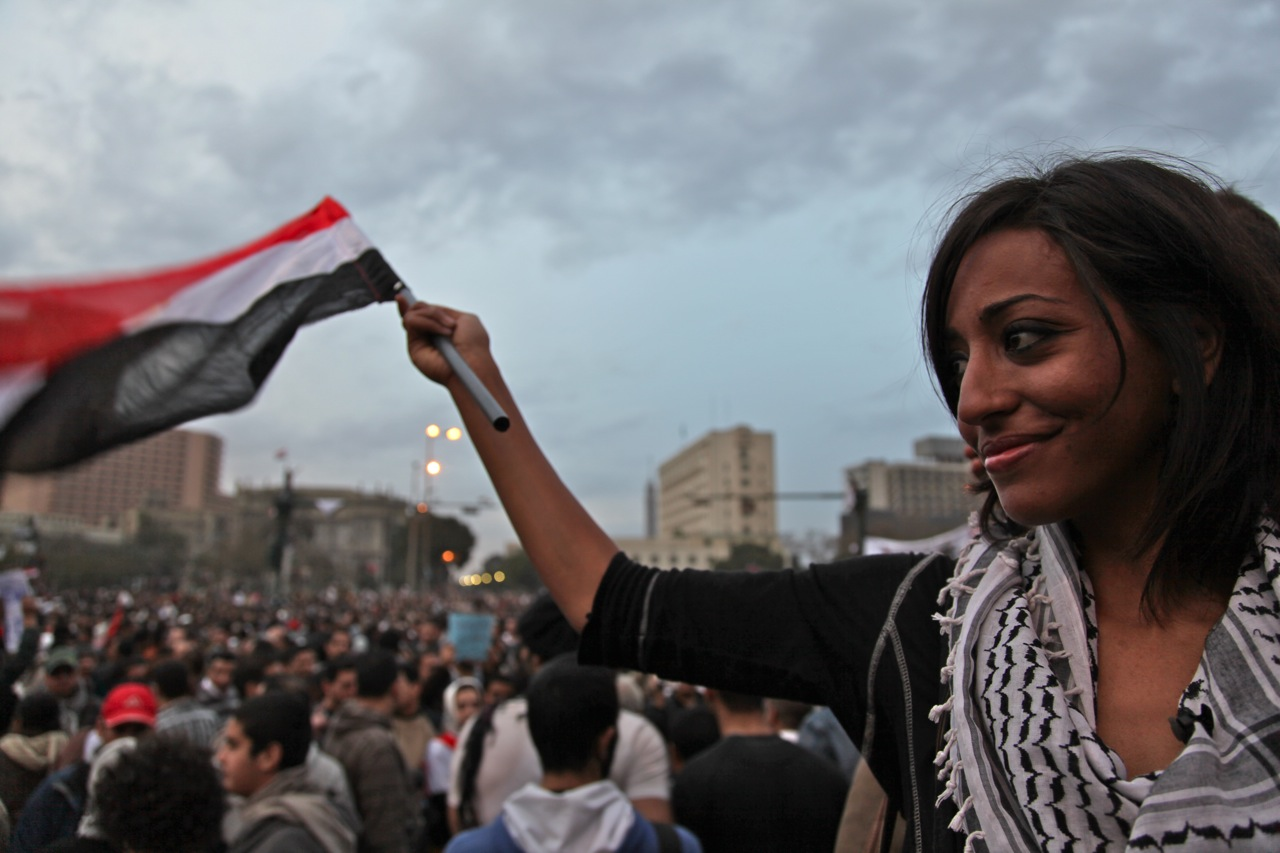
Ibrahim at a protest in February 2011

Ibrahim told Al Jazeera that her political activism began when she started talking to people who were involved in the labour movement, and that her family was uncomfortable with her going to protests. She became involved in the Egyptian revolution of 2011 as an organizer, additionally engaging in citizen journalism by using social media including Twitter while attending protests "to spread accurate information and paint a picture at the ground". Ibrahim and other Egyptian youth on Twitter played a leading role in organizing the events of January 25, 2011. Her tweets also helped to document arrests and state violence for human rights groups.

In October 2011, Ibrahim reported that she had been briefly arrested while filming a strike action by public transport workers in Cairo, and was released after agreeing to delete her footage.

By winter of 2012, Ibrahim had more than 30,000 followers on Twitter, and was active in protests against the Supreme Council of the Armed Forces.

=== Reception by Western media ===
Time magazine cover from February 28, 2011, with Ibrahim at bottom right.

Ibrahim became a face of the events in Egypt for much of the media. She regularly appeared on CNN, sometimes live from the 2011 protests, and additionally reported live from the protests on Al Jazeera. Her political views were rarely mentioned in Western media.

Judy Woodruff described Ibrahim as "a symbol of the uprising" on PBS NewsHour. On The Daily Show, Ibrahim told Jon Stewart that she initially joined the protests because of a class she took at the American University in Cairo called "Social Mobilization under Authoritarian Regimes." The New York Times conducted an interview with her using Skype, and a February 2011 Frontline episode titled "Gigi's Revolution" examined her relationship with her elite Egyptian family and "her attempts to convince her family of the righteousness of her cause." On February 14, 2011, she appeared on an Al Jazeera English talk show alongside Alaa Abd El-Fattah and Mohamad Waked to discuss the events in Egypt after the fall of Hosni Mubarak. She was also featured on the cover of the February 28, 2011 issue of Time magazine, later criticizing the related article in that issue by saying that the West "needs to believe that we could not have [made revolution possible] without their digital toys."

=== After the 2013 coup in Egypt ===
In July 2013, many militants from the revolution chose to leave after the 2013 Egyptian coup d'état, but Ibrahim stayed. As of July 2013, Ibrahim was living in Nasr City and continued to participate in activism and protests. In August 2013, she was part of a group called the Third Square that met in Sphinx Square in Giza to protest both the military government and the Muslim Brotherhood.

After the 2013 coup, Ibrahim's husband went into exile because he wanted to remain a journalist, while she founded a shoe manufacturing company in Cairo. In January 2021, she told Jeune Afrique that it was dangerous to protest and to be a journalist who didn't work on behalf of the regime, explaining that "We now live under a dictator worse than Mubarak [...] Any protest is punishable by sanctions. The protest is now being done underground."

== Shoe manufacturing career ==
After the 2013 coup in Egypt, Ibrahim founded a shoe manufacturing company in Cairo. A September 2021 article in The National identified Ibrahim as the co-owner of Cairo shoe manufacturing company Bulga, founded in 2016, along with artisan Mona Sorour. Ibrahim manages advertising, public relations and sales for the company, which is named after the traditional balgha. The shoes are designed through collaboration with indigenous groups in various regions of Egypt and manufactured in multiple workshops across the country, using exclusively Egyptian materials and labor; Ibrahim cited the decline of traditional craftsmanship resulting from the increase in mass-produced items as a major factor in the creation of Bulga.

Ibrahim has a United States passport and could leave Egypt. In October 2021, she explained her decision to remain in the country to The New Yorker, saying that "Maybe here I'm a second-class citizen as an Egyptian woman, but [in the U.S.] I'm a second-class terrorist."
