= Rosemont, Pennsylvania =

Unincorporated community in Pennsylvania, US

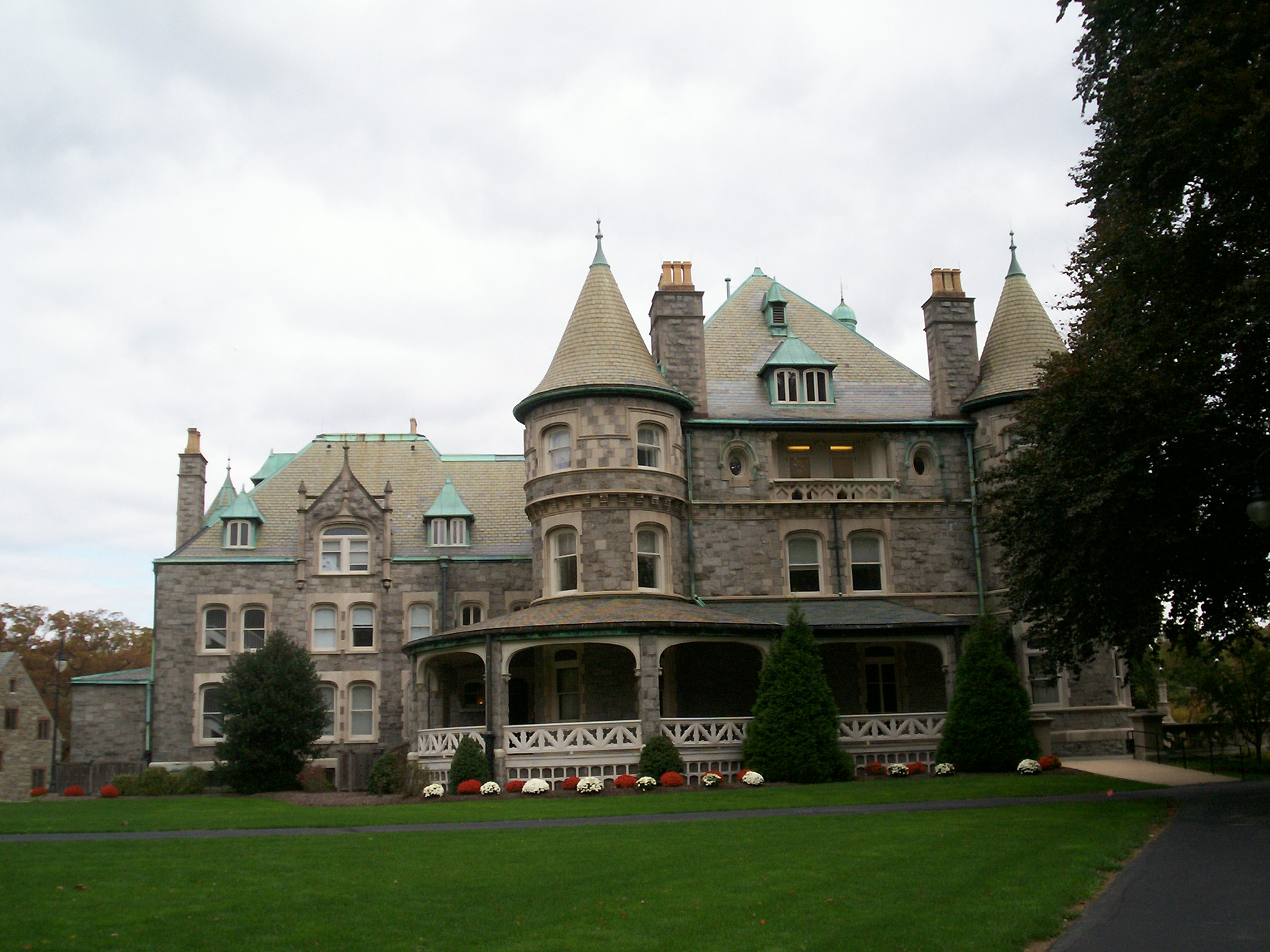
- The main building at Rosemont College

- Location of Rosemont in Pennsylvania Rosemont (the United States)
- Coordinates: 40°01′24″N 75°19′51″W
- Country: United States
- State: Pennsylvania
- Counties: Delaware County (part); Montgomery (part)
- Townships: Lower Merion (part); Radnor (part)

Area
  - Total: 0.82 sq mi (2.13 km^{2})
  - Land: 0.82 sq mi (2.13 km^{2})
  - Water: 0 sq mi (0.00 km^{2})
- Elevation: 341 ft (104 m)

Population (2020)
  - Total: 3,507
  - Density: 4,273.8/sq mi (1,650.13/km^{2})
- Time zone: UTC-5 (EST)
  - Summer (DST): UTC-4 (EDT)
- ZIP Code: 19010
- Area code: 610
- FIPS code: 42-66144

Rosemont is a neighborhood and census-designated place in Pennsylvania, United States. Partly in Lower Merion Township in Montgomery County and partly in Radnor Township in Delaware County, it is on the Philadelphia Main Line. It is best known as the home of Rosemont College. It is the location of the 1894 gothic-revival Anglo-Catholic Church of the Good Shepherd.

Rosemont is served by its own stops on both the Paoli/Thorndale Line of SEPTA Regional Rail and the Norristown High Speed Line.

The community of Garrett Hill is in Radnor Township and in the Rosemont section.

== History ==
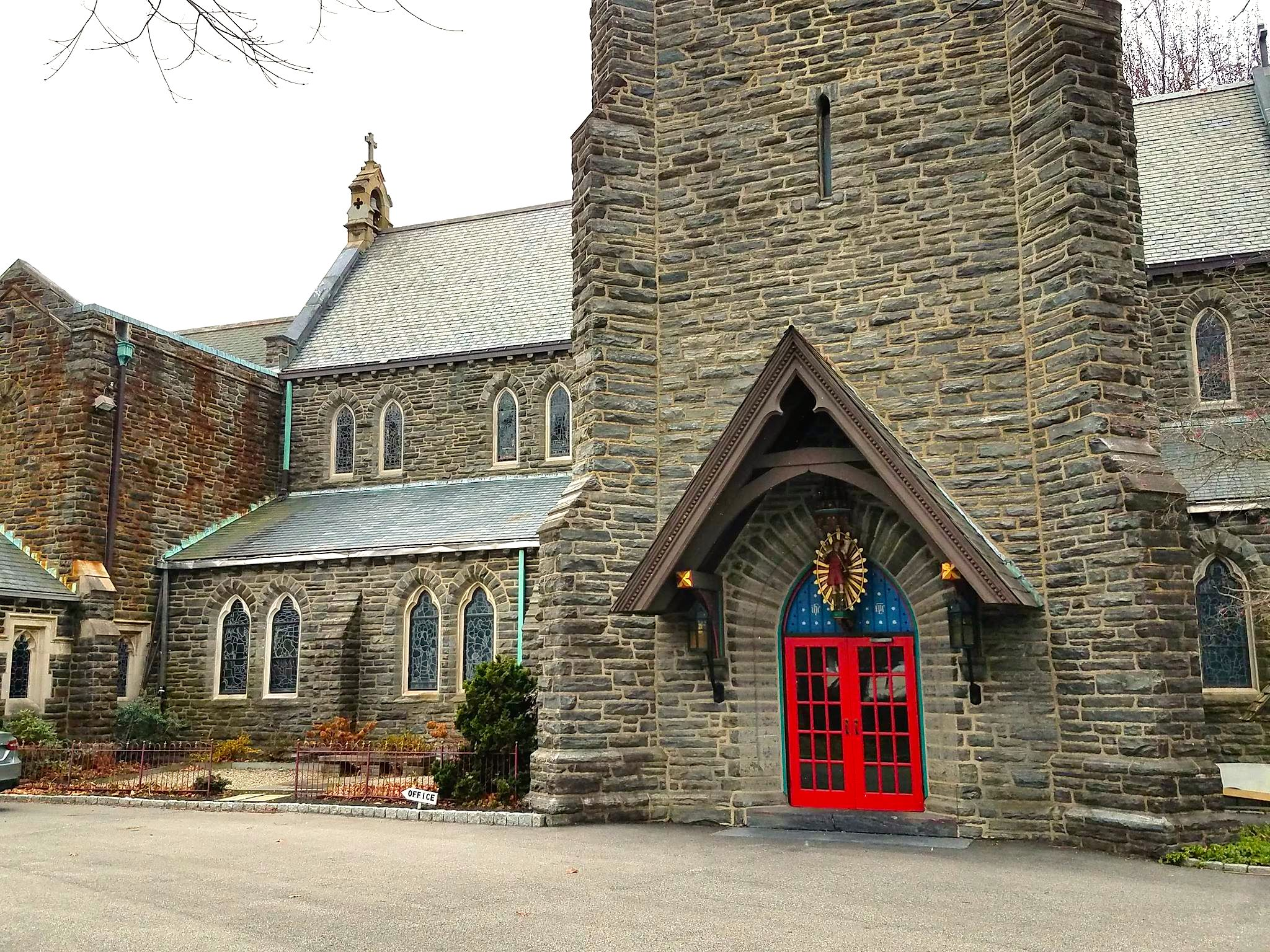
The Anglo-Catholic Church of the Good Shepherd, built in 1894, an example of Gothic Revival architecture on Lancaster Avenue in Rosemont

The Joseph Sinnott Mansion was listed on the National Register of Historic Places in 1980.

The neighborhood of "Beaupre" in Rosemont was once the 200-acre estate of the same name, built for Alexander Cassatt's son, Robert. The original mansion now is part of The Mansion at Rosemont, a senior living community that is part of the nonprofit organization Human Good. The original French iron gates flank entrances from Conestoga Road and South Ithan Avenue.

== Demographics ==
=== 2020 census ===
As of the 2020 census, Rosemont had a population of 3,507. The median age was 35.7 years. 18.4% of residents were under the age of 18 and 18.4% of residents were 65 years of age or older. For every 100 females there were 89.4 males, and for every 100 females age 18 and over there were 84.8 males age 18 and over.

100.0% of residents lived in urban areas, while 0.0% lived in rural areas.

There were 1,360 households in Rosemont, of which 27.1% had children under the age of 18 living in them. Of all households, 42.1% were married-couple households, 21.8% were households with a male householder and no spouse or partner present, and 31.3% were households with a female householder and no spouse or partner present. About 35.9% of all households were made up of individuals and 10.6% had someone living alone who was 65 years of age or older.

There were 1,465 housing units, of which 7.2% were vacant. The homeowner vacancy rate was 1.6% and the rental vacancy rate was 7.6%.

Racial composition as of the 2020 census
Race	Number	Percent
White	2,561	73.0%
Black or African American	318	9.1%
American Indian and Alaska Native	7	0.2%
Asian	390	11.1%
Native Hawaiian and Other Pacific Islander	1	0.0%
Some other race	41	1.2%
Two or more races	189	5.4%
Hispanic or Latino (of any race)	146	4.2%

== Education ==
=== Public schools ===
Pupils living in the Radnor Township portion of Rosemont attend schools in Radnor Township School District, while students in the Lower Merion Township portion attend schools in the Lower Merion School District.

As of 2024 school zoning for the Lower Merion Township portion is as follows: Gladwyne Elementary School, Black Rock Middle School, and Harriton High School.

Until 1980, the Radnor Township, Delaware County portion of the community was served by Rosemont Elementary School, located in the Garret Hill neighborhood of the town. The Rosemont Business Campus now stands on the former elementary school site. Children in these neighborhoods are now bused to the Radnor Elementary School.

=== Private schools ===
Holy Child School at Rosemont, formerly Rosemont School of the Holy Child, is a Catholic school in the Roman Catholic Archdiocese of Philadelphia and under the trusteeship of the Society of the Holy Child Jesus, which is run by a lay administration. The school is adjacent to Rosemont College, also founded by the same order.

The Agnes Irwin School is located on Ithan Avenue in Rosemont. It is an all-girl, non-sectarian, day school for PreK-Grade 12 founded by Miss Agnes Irwin and her sister Sofie.

The Roman Catholic Saint Thomas of Villanova Parish run by the Augustinian Order also ran a parochial school, which closed in the 1980s, adjacent to their Rosemont chapel and serving the Rosemont community.

=== Colleges and universities ===
Rosemont College is in Rosemont on Montgomery Avenue at Curwen Road.

Delaware County Community College covers the Delaware County portion. Montgomery County Community College covers the Montgomery County portion.

== Parks ==
Rosemont is home to the following parks:

- Ashbridge Memorial Park (Lower Merion Township)
- Austin Memorial Park (Lower Merion Township)
- Emlen Tunnell Park (Radnor Township)
- Clem Macrone Park (Radnor Township)
- Unkefer Park (Radnor Township)

== See also ==
- Church of the Good Shepherd (Rosemont, Pennsylvania)
