= Joseph F. Sinnott =

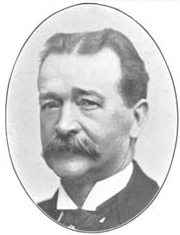
Portrait of Joseph Francis Sinnott

Joseph Francis Sinnott (1837–1906) was an Irish businessman who emigrated to Pennsylvania in 1854. After thirty-two years with John Gibson's, Son and Co distillery, Sinnott became the sole proprietor in 1888. The renamed Moore & Sinnott was known as the largest distiller of rye whiskey in the US with the capacity to produce 30,000 barrels per year. As a prominent Philadelphia businessman, Sinnott also became a trustee of the Philadelphia and Reading Railroad and served as director of the First National Bank. At the time of his death, his estate was valued at 2.2 million dollars. His former home, the Joseph Sinnott Mansion, was added to the National Register of Historic Places in 1980. It is now part of the campus of Rosemont College.

== Early life ==
Joseph F. Sinnott was the fourth of fourteen children to be born to a family with both military and seafaring roots in County Donegal, Ireland in 1837. Sinnott attended the Lord George Hill School in Gweedore, Donegal Ireland.

With the intent of joining his grandmother and his aunts in South Carolina, Sinnott emigrated America in 1854 at the age of 17 However, when he arrived in Philadelphia he learned that his grandmother and one of his aunts had perished at the hands yellow-fever and decided to remain in Philadelphia. Subsequently, Sinnott was hired by custom-house brokers Watkins & Weaver who he worked for until he found employment as an assistant bookkeeper with John Gibson, a fellow Irish immigrant at John Gibson's Son & Co., a whiskey distillery, in 1856.

== Military history ==
Sinnott enlisted in Pennsylvania's Seventeenth infantry regiment on April 25^{th,} 1861 as a private. The Seventeenth was deployed to Maryland as part of the Union army's effort to control the Baltimore area, which was crucial for defense and control of access to Washington, D.C. Sinnott's unit would assume the role of securing access to DC via Maryland movement. The regiment then proceeded south, eventually ending its movement in Charleston, Virginia. A letter sent by Sinnott in July was reprinted in the Philadelphia Inquirer recounting the pleas to the Philadelphia boys to remain a few weeks more since they had not “yet had the occasion to display their valor upon the field of battle”. The unit was ordered back to Philadelphia and disbanded. Sinnott was officially mustered out of the Seventeenth on August 7, 1861.

Family lore has it that Sinnott was offered a commission as an officer but turned it down to resume work for his former employer, moving to Boston to oversee a new branch of John Gibson's Son & Co.

== Business ==
John Gibson's Son & Co. was established in 1854, when John Gibson became disappointed with the limited amount of whiskey he was able to buy from Monongahela distilleries for his growing business. Thus, in 1856, he started his own distillery and produced the first whiskey in 1857 at Gibsonton. Gibsonton was not only where the distilling took place but was also a town and home for the employees. The main offices of John Gibson's Son & Co would remain in Philadelphia, however, many other office branches were established in various locations such as Boston, Louisiana, Georgia. Sinnott left the army to oversee a new branch of John Gibson's Son & Co in Boston, Massachusetts in 1861. Sinnott returned to Philadelphia in 1866 to become a partner at John Gibson's Son & Co., and in 1884 became a co-owner upon the retirement of Gibson. Sinnott and Moore continued the partnership until Moore's death in 1898, after which Sinnott gained sole control of the firm.

Looking to diversify his holdings, Sinnott eventually became a major railroad investor. In addition to being a successful in the realms of distilling and railroad transportation, Joseph F. Sinnott served as the director of the First National Bank in Philadelphia.

== Family life ==
Nine years after his arrival in the United States, in 1863, Joseph F. Sinnott married Annie Eliza Rogers at Philadelphia. The couple had nine children together, six boys and three girls.

1. Joseph Edward Sinnott (April 13, 1864 – July 21, 1882)
2. Mary Elizabeth Sinnott (March 26, 1866 – 1919)
3. Henry Gibson Sinnott (November 3, 1867– February 14, 1899)
4. Annie Leonora Sinnott Devereux (December 7, 1869 – 1944)
5. Clinton Rogers Sinnott (July 12, 1872 – May 21, 1943)
6. James Frederick Sinnott (December 14, 1873 – May 7, 1908)
7. John Sinnott (December 13, 1875 – December 10, 1944)
8. Clarence Coffin Sinnott (October 6, 1878 – 1938)
9. Eliza Lorea Sinnott (November 21, 1880 – June 1, 1882)

Sinnott's younger brother, James Patrick Sinnott (1848–1925), also immigrated and became a Reverend Monsignor and rector of St. Charles Borromeo.

== Religious and political views ==
Sinnott was publicly against prohibition. By the end of the 1880s he was generously funding the anti-prohibition campaign in Pennsylvania to thwart passage of laws that could have threatened his business.

Sinnott was a devout Catholic as was evident with his service as a member of the St. Charles Theological Seminary and the Catholic Historical Society. In life, Sinnott donated to and actively worked with organizations for the advancement of the Catholic church, and in his will, he left a hefty sum to multiple Catholic charities. Sinnott also took care to keep ties with his homeland, supporting famine stricken families and less fortunate individuals back in Ireland and, as a member of the Friendly Sons of St. Patrick, he provided help for his fellow Irishmen who lacked the good fortune that he had upon arriving in America

== Honors ==
Sinnott was a representative of the whiskey trade at the Commercial Exchange in 1867, and protested a law on the storage of whiskey which liquormen deemed unjust and a detriment to their businesses. Sinnott was also a member of the Pennsylvania Reserve Association, which paid respects to General Meade in 1872 as well as secretary to a committee with other transportation elites that supported the Transatlantic Line. Sinnott was not only on the board of directors of the Philadelphia Catholic Gentlemen's Club, but was also appointed to a committee of Wine and Liquor Men to raise money for the Centennial, and was nominated as a member of the selection committee of the New York Herald's campaign for famine relief in Ireland in 1880.

== Death ==
Joseph F. Sinnott died in June 1906, presumably of colon cancer. Sinnott left behind an estate valued at more than two million dollars. He also dedicated a large portion of his wealth to charitable purposes, including a donation of $10,000 in trust to the Pennsylvania University hospital to set aside and maintain a room for a sick or injured journalist or writer, in honor of his late son, Joseph Edward Sinnott. Similarly, Sinnott requested that a room be set aside in St. Joseph's hospital as well, in the name of Henry Gibson Sinnott, his other deceased son. Sinnott also gave thousands to various Catholic institutions, such as St. John's Orphans’ Asylum, St. Charles Borromeo Theological Seminary, Little Sisters of the Poor, and the Catholic Home for Destitute Children, among others.
