= Mayfield School, East Sussex =

Mayfield School
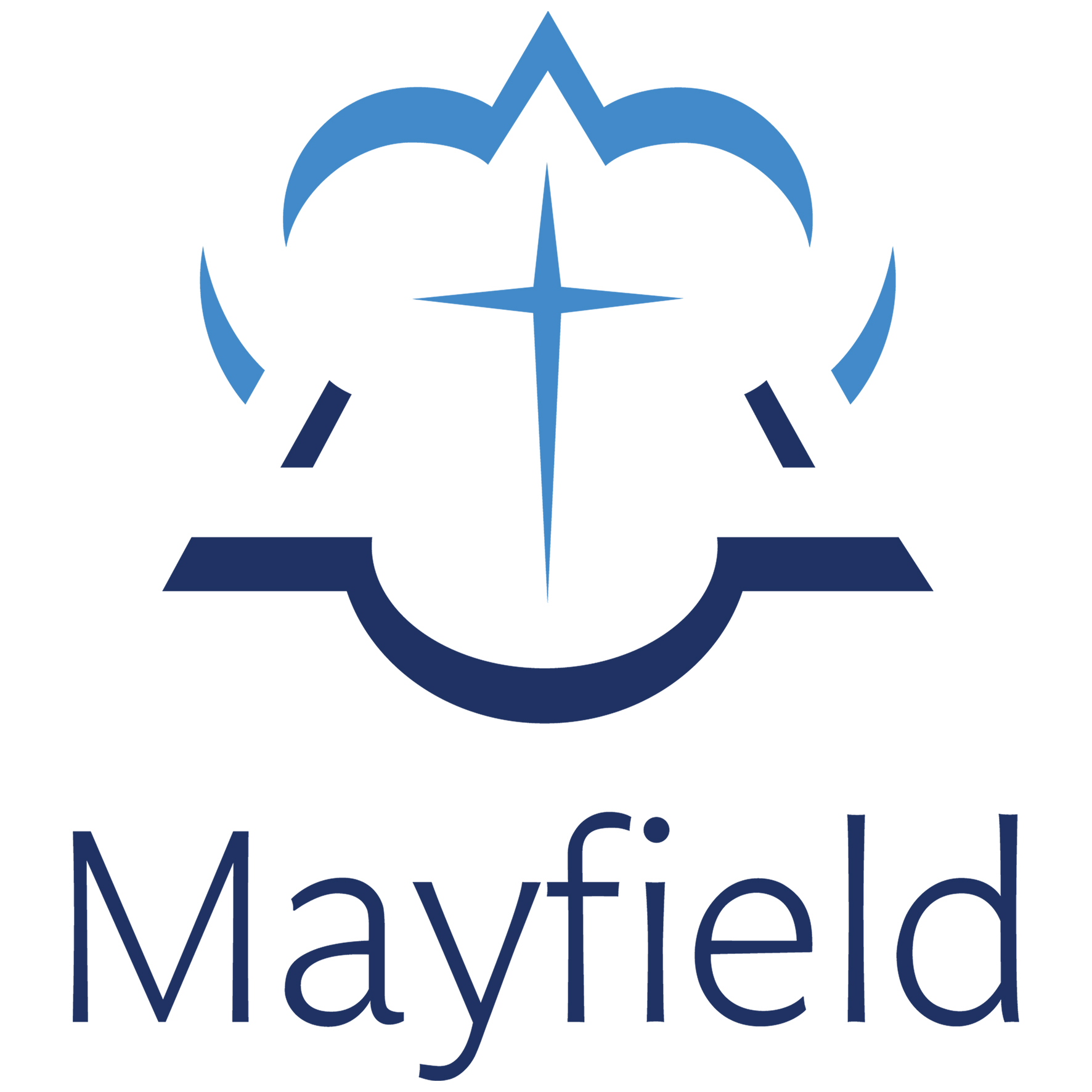

Location
- The Old Palace; Mayfield, East Sussex, TN20 6PH; England; 51.0215°N 0.2617°E

Information
- Type: Private Catholic day and boarding school
- Motto: Actions Not Words
- Established: 1872
- Founder: Mother Cornelia Connelly SHCJ (1809–1870)
- Department for Education URN: 114627 Tables
- Chairman of the Governors: The Lady Davies of Stamford
- Headmistress: Deborah Bligh
- Gender: Girls
- Age: 11 to 18
- Enrolment: 400
- Houses: 4
- Colours: Light Blue, Navy Blue
- Alumnae: Old Cornelians
- Website: www.mayfieldgirls.org

Mayfield School, previously St Leonards-Mayfield School, is an independent Catholic boarding and day school for girls aged 11 to 18. It is in the village of Mayfield in East Sussex. The school was founded by Mother Cornelia Connelly, S.H.C.J., in 1872, with the oldest buildings dating from the 14th century.

== History ==
Mayfield School has its origins in the Convent of the Holy Child Jesus school at St Leonards-on-Sea. Mother Cornelia Connelly of the Society of the Holy Child Jesus chanced upon the Old Palace at the village of Mayfield. At that time Louisa Caton, the Duchess of Leeds (widow of Francis D'Arcy-Osborne, 7th Duke of Leeds) had requested Mother Connelly to take her in as a nun. Despite her efforts Mother Connelly remained unimpressed. The Duchess then turned her attention to setting up orphanages. She purchased the Mayfield estate which included the Old Palace and presented it to the Society. On the morning of 18 November 1863 Mass was celebrated at Mayfield for the first time since the mid-16th century. The school moved from St. Leonard's to Torquay early in World War II to avoid German bombing, only to relocate months later to Hedsor House after being bombed in Torquay. The original school at St Leonards and the new school at Mayfield merged in 1953 to form the current school. The junior school was closed in 1975 and St Leonards-Mayfield thus became solely a senior school. In March 2015 the school changed its name to Mayfield School, but it retains its links with the SHCJ. The teachers are mostly lay staff but the nuns still maintain a presence as members of the Board of Governors and pastoral care staff.

=== Old Palace ===
The Old Palace was originally a holiday residence of the Archbishops of Canterbury during the 14th and 15th centuries. During the Reformation, it was handed over to King Henry VIII who gave it to several leading noblemen of his day. Thomas Gresham lived there and Queen Elizabeth I was among his guests at the Old Palace. It was bought by the Baker family, a prominent family in the iron foundry industry. As the iron industry began to decline, so did the family's fortunes. The Old Palace became derelict and abandoned by the mid 18th century. It has since been designated a Grade I listed building.

== Location and facilities ==
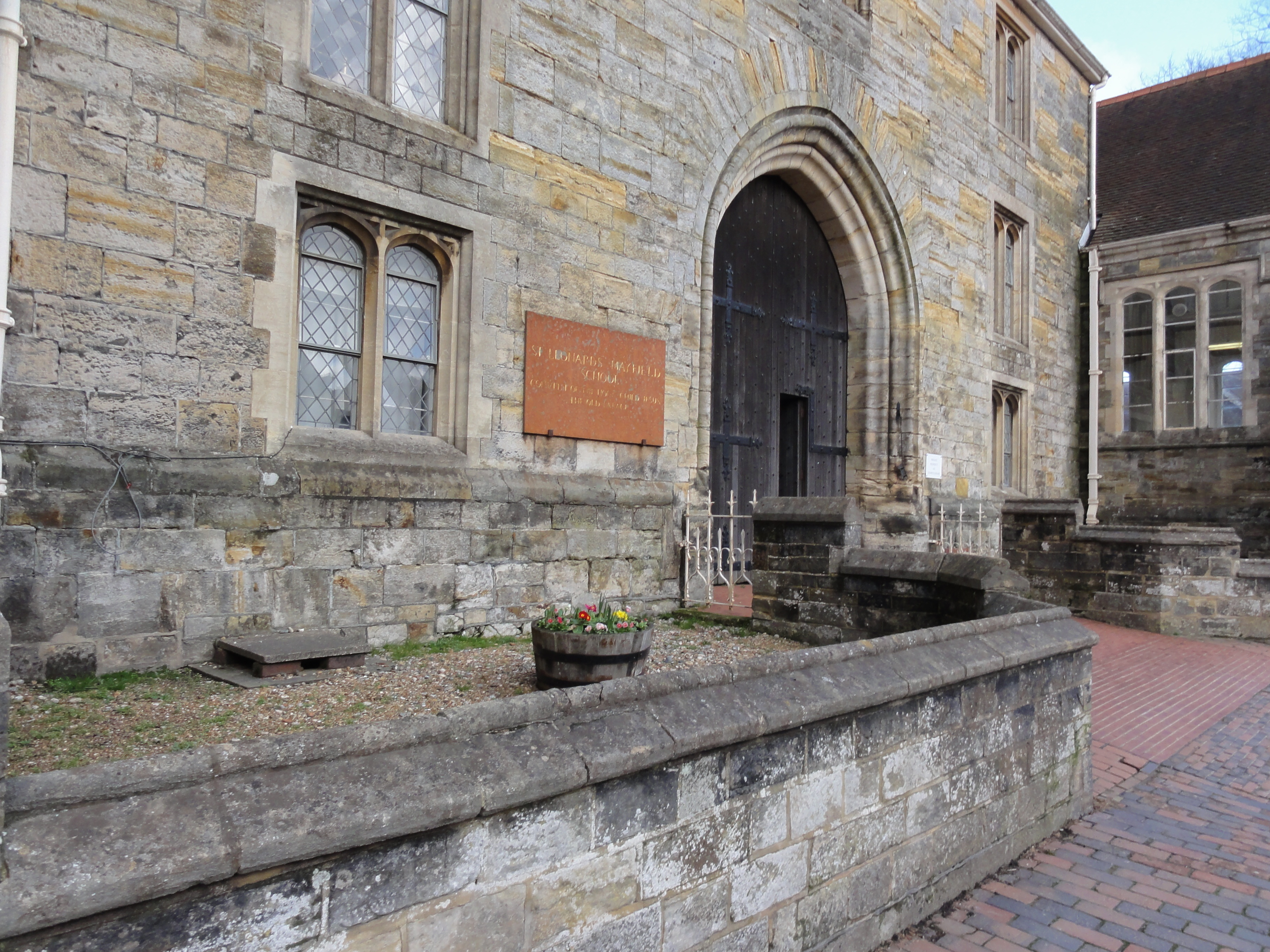
View of the entrance to the school from the High Street

The school has a 14th-century chapel built for the Archbishops of Canterbury and a concert hall designed by Sir Giles Gilbert Scott. The sports facilities include an all-weather pitch, eight all-weather tennis and netball courts, an indoor swimming pool and a riding arena. The school has music rooms, ceramics and arts studios and a dance hall. There is also a science block.

== Links with other Holy Child schools ==
The Society of the Holy Child Jesus still runs a network of schools across its three provinces: Europe, Africa and America.

Mayfield has links with other Holy Child Schools. In 2010 children from the Cornelia Connelly School in Anaheim, California visited Mayfield and the headmistress visited Holy Child College in Ikoyi, Nigeria.

== Notable alumnae ==
- Anouk Aimée (1932–2024), actress
- Sophia Bennett (born 1966), crime novelist and children's writer
- Lindka Cierach (born 1952), couturier and fashion designer
- Emily Craig (born 1992), world champion rower
- Alondra de la Parra (born 1980), conductor
- Maeve Gilmore (1917–1983), painter, sculptor and writer
- Caroline Goodall (born 1959), actress, screenwriter and producer
- Dione Venables (1930–2023), novelist and publisher
- Olivia Hetreed (born 1961), screenwriter and editor
- Judith Kazantzis (1940–2018), poet and activist
- Ann Leslie (1941–2023), journalist
- Helena Little (born 1960), actor
- Victoria de Marichalar y Borbón (born 2000), fifth in the line of succession to the Spanish throne
- Clare McLaren-Throckmorton (1935–2017), barrister
- Folu Storms (born 1986), radio host and presenter, actor and television host
- Thérèse Vanier (1923–2014), doctor specialising in haematology and palliative care
- Mary Charles Walker (1881–1966), religious sister, teacher and missionary
