= Pierce Connelly =

American apostate Episcopal priest and anti-Catholic pamphleteer (1804–1883)

Pierce Connelly (August 9, 1804, Philadelphia, Pennsylvania – December 16, 1883, Florence, Kingdom of Italy), also known by the pen name Pascal the Younger and Pen Cler Jocelyn, was an American apostate Episcopal priest, anti-Catholic pamphleteer, journalist and founder of the St. James Episcopal Church in Florence. Connelly was the father of the sculptor Pierce Francis Connelly.
