= Karen Patricia Williams =

Women's health researcher

- Occupation: Professor of Women's Health

Academic background
- Education: Temple University; Michigan State University Wharton Executive Education

Karen Patricia Williams is an American professor of women's health who is executive director of the endowed Martha S. Pitzer Center for Women, Children and Youth in the College of Nursing at Ohio State University where she leads research and clinical faculty. Williams is a NIH funded scholar with expertise in community-based participatory research, health services research and women's health policy. She is interested in the intersection of cardiovascular disease and cancer risk in women, as well as how families and various culturally specific networks can be engaged in cancer prevention and control.

== Education and career ==
Born in Philadelphia, Williams earned her Bachelor of Arts degree (journalism, 1984) from Temple University and soon after began teaching as an Instructor at Jackson Community College. Later she earned both her M.A. (1993) in Higher Education Administration and Ph.D. in Community Development (1998) from Michigan State University. Williams completed Wharton Executive Education and is an alumna of the Executive Leadership in Academic Medicine program and the CIC-Academic Leadership Program. She was president of the American Association for Cancer Education in 2012, president of the board for the Susan G. Komen for Greater Lansing Affiliate and a former co-chair of the Minority Women’s Health Panel of Experts with the United States Public Health Service’s Office on Women’s Health. Williams is a co-chair for an NIH-CSR Study Section and is a member of the Michigan Cancer Consortium Breast Cancer Committee. In 2021, she was recognized as one of the "25 Influential Black Women in Business."

== Research ==
=== The Kin Keeper ===
Williams, concerned that the burden of breast and cervical cancers fall more heavily on African-American women than on Caucasian and Asian women, began to focus her attention on finding a positive and culturally-relevant method to address this disparity. Through her studies, Williams discovered that family strongly influences Black women in their decision to pursue cancer prevention practices. Thus, Williams developed the Kin Keeper intervention by using the premise that the natural ways that Black women talk about health to females in their families can be used to influence them to participate in cancer prevention and screening practices.

The Kin Keeper, initially funded by the Susan G. Komen for the Cure, is a female family-focused intervention. By meeting in-home, this intervention breaks down some of the intimidating barriers to preventative health care. By meeting in a comfortable, in-home setting, individuals can become educated on potentially life-saving procedures in a unique and impactful way. Because of the success seen in the Kin Keeper, Williams has done the work to translate the curriculum into Spanish and Arabic. This has helped reach other populations with this life-saving preventative health care information.

=== Cancer Literacy Assessment Tool (Breast-CLAT & C-LAT) ===
As Williams contemplated assessments for The Kin Keeper, it became clear that breast and cervical cancer literacy would need to be incorporated throughout this intervention. This meant that appropriate tools would need to be designed to assess the health literacy of women engaged in the cancer prevention intervention. Given the need for new tools, Williams developed two Cancer Literacy Assessment Tools for breast and cervical cancer. Both the Breast-CLAT and the C-CLAT have the ability to: 1. Be administered orally, 2. Is simple enough for a layperson, like a community health worker, to administer, 3. Can capture a women's functional understanding of breast and or cervical cancer. In particular, the Breast-CLAT has been stringently tested and seen to be a valuable tool to measure health literacy for the benefit of cancer researchers and health educators.

=== Black women's health ===
Currently, Williams and her team are working to identify factors and cofactors of resilience and allostatic load among Black women. She is the director for the Research on Black Women Across the Diaspora. There, Williams has formed a multidisciplinary team from various universities and clinical settings with experience in basic, population, behavioral and environmental sciences. Williams and the team have an interest in Black women's ability to rebound from life circumstances created by chronic stress. At the same time, they are studying the physical and psychological cost of chronic stress that contributes to wear and tear on the body over time.

== Personal life ==
Williams lives in Columbus, OH and has two adult daughters. She is a member of Trinity Baptist Church, The Links, Incorporated and Delta Sigma Theta.
