= Temple University =

Public university in Philadelphia, Pennsylvania, US

- Former names: The Baptist Temple (1884–1888); The Temple College of Philadelphia (1888–1907); Philadelphia Dental College (1863–1907); Pennsylvania School of Horticulture for Women (1910–1958); Pennsylvania College of Podiatric Medicine (1963–1998)
- Motto: Perseverantia Vincit (Latin)
- Motto in English: "Perseverance Wins"
- Type: Public state-related research university
- Established: May 12, 1888; 138 years ago (official date it was chartered; institution roots began 1884 with church classes)
- Founder: Russell Conwell
- Accreditation: MSCHE
- Academic affiliations: CUMU; GCU; ORAU; USU; space-grant
- Endowment: $1.05 billion (2025)
- Chancellor: Richard M. Englert (honorary)
- President: John Fry
- Provost: Elizabeth Wentz
- Faculty: 1,327 part-time; 2,125 full-time (fall 2024)
- Administrative staff: 3,805 (fall 2024)
- Students: 30,005 (fall 2024)
- Undergraduates: 21,747 (fall 2024)
- Postgraduates: 8,258 (fall 2024)
- Location: Philadelphia, Pennsylvania, United States; 39°58′53″N 75°09′16″W
- Campus: 115 acres (47 ha) (main campus); Large city
- Other campuses: Center City; Ambler; Harrisburg; Rome; Tokyo; Kyoto
- Newspaper: The Temple News
- Colors: Cherry and white
- Nickname: Owls
- Sporting affiliations: NCAA Division I FBS – The American; Philadelphia Big 5; City 6
- Mascots: Hooter T. Owl; Stella (live great horned owl)
- Website: temple.edu

Temple University (Temple or TU) is a public state-related research university in Philadelphia, Pennsylvania, United States. It was founded in 1884 by the Baptist minister Russell Conwell and his congregation at the Grace Baptist Church of Philadelphia, then called Baptist Temple. Today, Temple is the third-largest university in Pennsylvania by enrollment and awarded 9,128 degrees in the 2023–24 academic year. It has a worldwide alumni base of 378,012, with 352,175 alumni residing in the United States.

The university consists of 17 schools and colleges, including five professional schools, offering over 640+ academic programs and over 160 undergraduate majors. As of 2024, about 30,005 undergraduate, graduate and professional students were enrolled at the university. It is classified among "R1: Doctoral Universities – Very high research activity," spending $301,395,000 on research and development in 2022 according to the National Science Foundation.

Temple has 18 NCAA Division I varsity sports teams and competes as a member of the American Athletic Conference. Temple's varsity teams, known as the Temple Owls, have won three team national championships.

== History ==
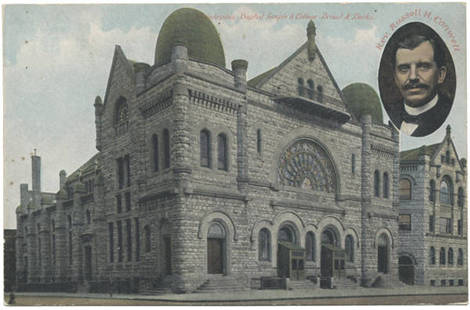
Postcard depicting the original Baptist Temple and Russell Conwell

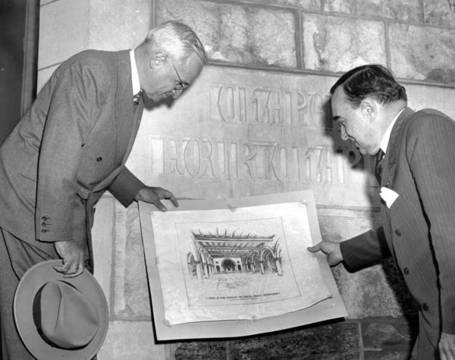
President Harry S. Truman visits Temple University.

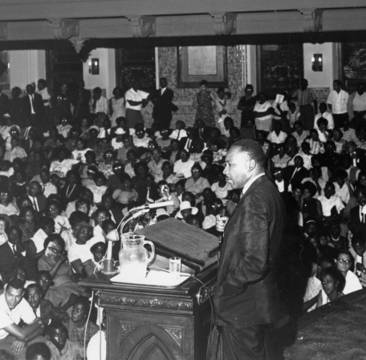
Martin Luther King Jr. lecturing at Temple University in 1965

=== Founding ===
Temple University was founded in 1884 by Grace Baptist Church of Philadelphia and its pastor Russell Conwell, a Yale-educated lawyer, orator, and ordained Baptist minister, who served in the Union Army during the American Civil War. Conwell came to Pennsylvania in 1882 to lead the Grace Baptist Church. One evening in June 1884, a young aspiring minister named Charles Davies approached Conwell after a service to express his desire to prepare for the ministry, but did not have the means to attend college. Conwell offered to teach Davies, who showed up to the first class with six friends. By the third class, this number had reached forty. where he began tutoring working-class citizens at night in the basement of Conwell's Baptist Temple (hence the origin of the university's name and mascot).

Conwell's night classes quickly grew popular within the North Philadelphia area. The Grace Baptist Church created a board of trustees, which named Russell Conwell president of the Temple College. Following an unsuccessful meeting with 34 Philadelphia Baptist churches, the Grace Baptist Church appointed a new board of trustees, printed official admissions files, and issued stock to raise funds for new teaching facilities. The church provided classrooms, and teachers, and financed the school in its early years. The church and Conwell's desire was "to give education to those who were unable to get it through the usual channels".

In 1891, Temple's first graduating class of eighteen men received the Bachelor of Oratory degree. However, state and federal education agencies would not identify Temple as a legitimate college level institution. Philadelphia granted a charter in 1888 to establish the Temple College of Philadelphia, but the city refused to grant authority to award academic degrees. By 1888, the enrollment of the college was nearly 600: because of Temple's aim of offering an education to Philadelphia's working class, there were no admissions requirements and tuition was free.

Over time, Temple expanded. Samaritan Hospital (now Temple University Hospital) was founded by the Grace Baptist Church in 1892, and Temple added a medical school in 1901. Temple merged with Garretson Hospital the Philadelphia Dental College in 1906. After the merger, Temple officially reincorporated as Temple University on December 12, 1907. The School of Nursing was established in 1911, followed by the Teacher's College in 1914. Russell Conwell died in 1925 after a 38-year presidency at Temple, and is buried at the Founder's Garden on campus.

=== 20th century expansion ===
In 1954, Temple's board of trustees made a pledge to grow the campus to 210 acres. That year, Temple University agreed to terms to purchase 11 1/2 acres (4.7 ha) of the adjacent Monument Cemetery and repurpose it for athletic fields and a parking lot. Families of the deceased claimed about 8,000 of the 28,000 bodies on the site and the rest were moved to an unmarked mass grave at Lawnview Memorial Park. Many of the remaining headstones from the cemetery, including a monument to George Washington and Marquis de Lafayette, were used as riprap for the Betsy Ross Bridge. This land is now an athletic field, student recreation center, and parking lot, and is slated to be a new media and performance center.

Temple hired Philadelphia architecture firm Nolen & Swinburne Associates to devise a university expansion plan in 1955. The plan called for the demolition of historic row houses and proposed a classic campus quadrangle comprising large Modernist towers, a central plaza, a bell tower, walkways, lawns, and cloistered gardens. The firm complained that the "squeeze of the slum area is becoming intolerable" and went on to say that Temple was positioned, finally, "to wipe the slate clean from the ground up. Hundreds of North Philadelphia residents were displaced when Temple demolished rowhomes, churches, and businesses to make room for its expansion. In 1966, Nolen & Swinburne returned to work for Temple University, this time creating a development plan. All that remains of the 1800 block of Park Avenue is a group of facades that have been incorporated into a single building (called 1810 Liacouras Walk) and a small church (Shusterman Hall).

The Ambler Junior College of Temple University was formed by the merging of the Pennsylvania School of Horticulture for Women with Temple University. This created Temple University Ambler, which is approximately 15 miles (24 km) from Temple's Main Campus. That same year, the Ambler Campus of Temple University began accepting men, two of which applied that year.

In 1965, Temple became a Pennsylvania state-related university, meaning the university receives state funds, subject to state appropriations, but is independently operated. It is one of four schools to have this designation, alongside Lincoln University, Pennsylvania State University, and the University of Pittsburgh. This is the only public-private hybrid system of higher education of its particular type in the United States.

In the spring of 1969, the Steering Committee for Black Students pushed for more community voices involved in Temple's plans for expansion, as well as an Afro-Asian Institute and special admissions for Hispanic and African-American students. Then-university President Paul R. Anderson feigned cooperation, but meetings between the committee and school administration went nowhere. It wasn't until Pennsylvania Governor Raymond Shafer forced one: Temple would limit the height of buildings on the campus perimeter and keep 10 of 22 disputed acres.

Marvin Wachman, Anderson's successor, sought to be more open with students than Anderson was. When students protested over campus cafeteria food prices and seating arrangements, Wachman delivered what the students wanted: food trucks on campus. To this day, food trucks line the streets of Temple's Main Campus, offering students an alternative to the dining halls.

On January 31, 1979, Temple University awarded an honorary Doctor of Laws degree to Chinese Vice Premier Deng Xiaoping during his visit to the United States. The degree was presented by Temple president Marvin Wachman at a ceremony at Blair House in Washington, D.C. Temple biology professor Man-Chiang Niu helped arrange the award. Deng subsequently invited a Temple delegation that included Niu to visit China. The delegation's visit helped establish a long-term academic exchange between the university and institutions in China.

Peter J. Liacouras, namesake of the Liacouras Center and Liacouras Walk, served as Temple's seventh president from 1982 to 2000. Under Liacouras, Temple's profile began to grow: men's basketball coach John Chaney helped the team reach national prominence. Temple's iconic "T" logo was designed under Liacouras's presidency. Liacouras expanded both the school's academics and budget: the university's endowment rose from $15 million in 1982 to $109 million in 1999.

=== 21st century ===
In 2016, Temple was classified by the Carnegie Foundation for the Advancement of Teaching as a research university with very high research activity, with research expenditures reaching $242 million.

On March 13, 2020, the university suspended in-person instruction due to the COVID-19 pandemic. The Liacouras Center, Temple's basketball arena, was converted into a 200-bed "COVID-19 surge facility" due to the potential of hospitals reaching patient capacity, although only 14 patients were admitted. Temple reopened Main Campus for the Fall 2020 semester under a hybrid model, offering a mix of online classes and in-person learning. The university required COVID-19 tests for all students moving into campus housing, face coverings to be worn in all buildings, and students and faculty maintain six feet of physical distance from one another to mitigate the spread of COVID-19. However, in September, Temple suspended in-person classes for remainder of fall semester, three days after deciding to stop in-person classes for two weeks as a precaution after 103 students on campus tested positive for COVID-19. In May 2022, Temple held its first in-person, university-wide graduation ceremony since 2019.

On November 29, 2021, Moshe Porat, former dean of Temple University's business school was convicted on charges of conspiracy and wire fraud for a scheme in which he and others used false data to boost the school's position on the US News & World Report rankings.

On January 31, 2023, the graduate student workers' union at Temple University declared an ongoing labor strike, following a year of stalled negotiations for a labor contract. Temple University retaliated on February 8 by terminating the strikers' health insurance and tuition benefits, an action that propelled the strike to national news. The strike ended in mid-March.

Shortly after graduate student strike ended, university president Jason Wingard resigned. In the months prior to his resignation, he had come under fire for his decisions during the strike as well as a rise in crime and violence on and near the university's campus. Shortly before his resignation, the university's board of trustees had announced increased oversight of the university. The university's faculty had also planned a no-confidence vote. JoAnne Epps was named Acting President on April 11, 2023. Epps died after suffering a sudden, as yet undisclosed, medical episode during a university event on September 19, 2023.

In October of 2023, Temple University students protested against the Gaza war and criticized the administration's pro-Israel stance. The protesters called for justice in Palestine and demanded financial divestment from companies that profit from the war in Gaza. The ACLU became involved when administration started disciplinary action against students for participating in a "Gaza Solidarity" encampment off-campus. The protests continued into the next academic year with the University amending its campus guidelines to discourage further protests.

On July 3, 2024, Temple's Board of Trustees announced it had appointed John Fry as its 15th president.

== Campus ==
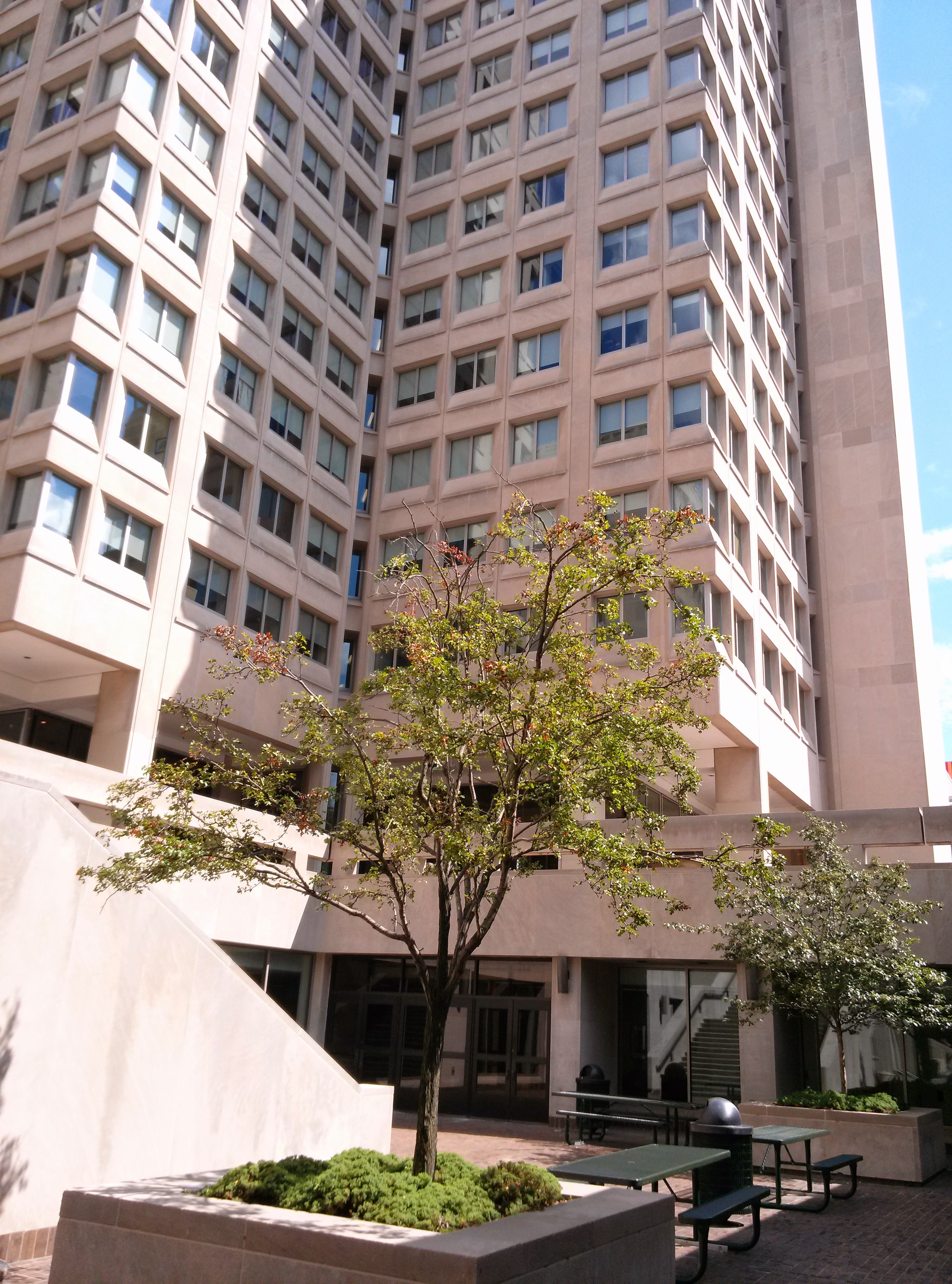
Mazur Hall

Temple University has six campuses and sites across Pennsylvania, plus international campuses in Rome and Japan.

=== Pennsylvania campuses ===
==== Main campus ====
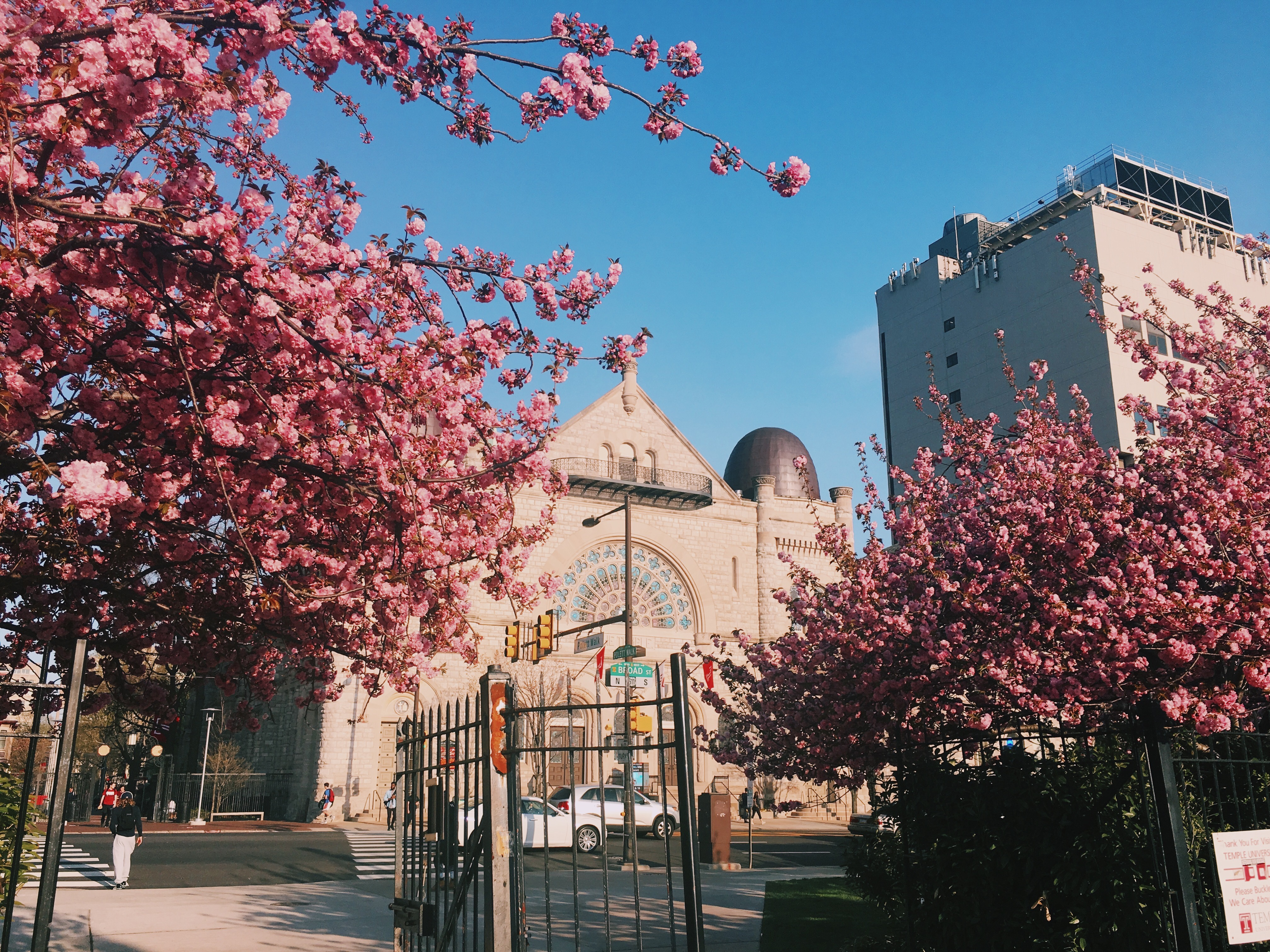
Temple University Performing Arts Center in 2017

Temple's main campus is in the Cecil B. Moore neighborhood of North Philadelphia, about 1.5 miles (2.4 km) north of Center City. It occupies 118 acres (48 ha).

Upon its founding, the Grace Baptist Church of Philadelphia built two buildings on North Broad Street between Montgomery and Norris: a Baptist Temple in 1891, and an academic building (College Hall, now Barrack Hall) in 1893. The Baptist Temple was certified by the Philadelphia Historical Commission as an Historical Building in 1984, and in 2003 it was designated by the American Institute of Architects as a Landmark Building. In 2010, it was converted into a 1200-seat, multipurpose performance venue, with the church's stained glass window as a centerpiece.

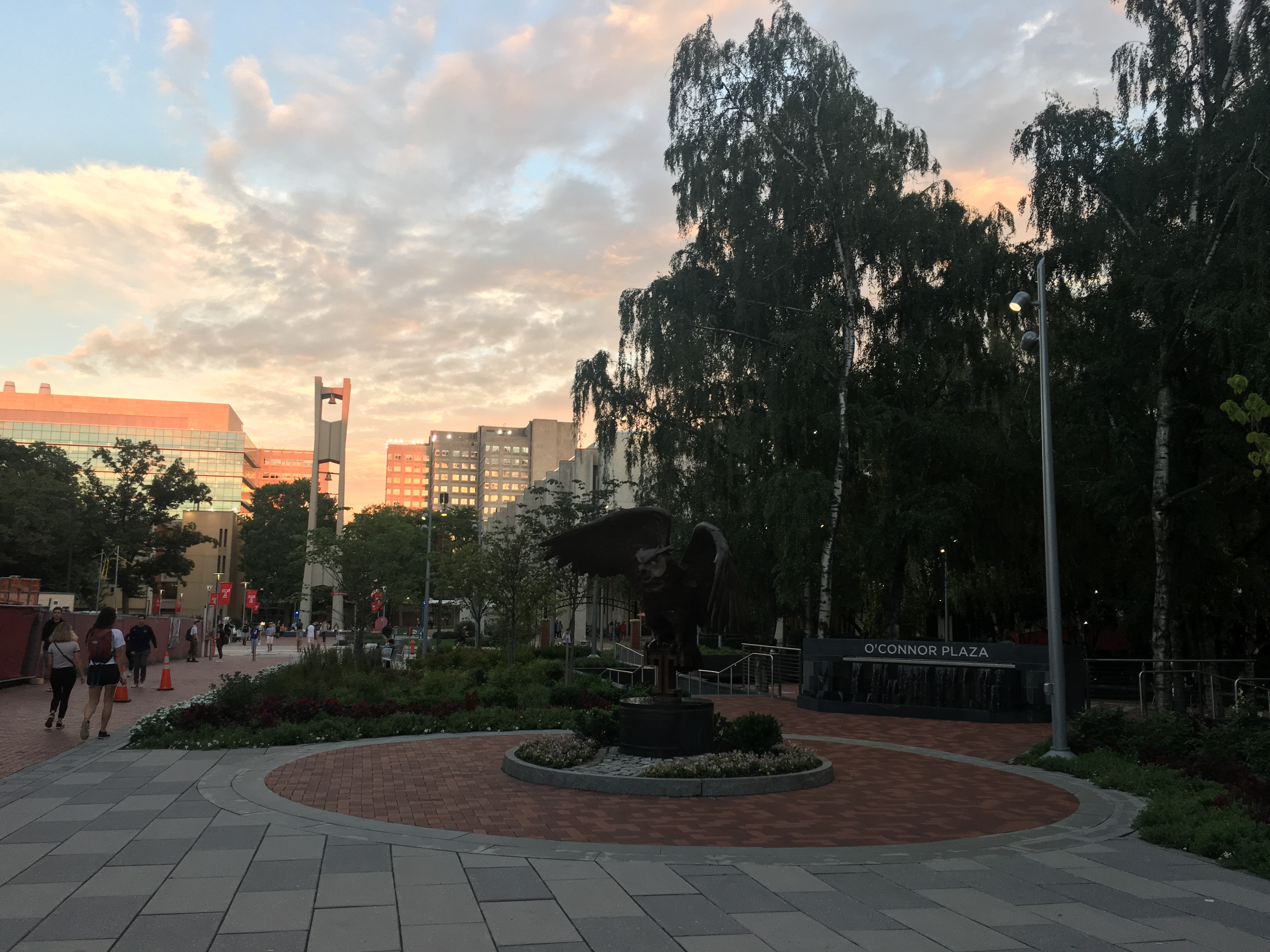
O'Connor Plaza in 2018

Temple's campus has several landmarks. The 110 feet (34 m)-tall Bell Tower is the visual icon of the university and a major campus landmark. Nearby Founder's Garden is the burial place of Russell Conwell, founder and 38-year president of Temple. A bust of Conwell marks his grave. O'Connor Plaza surrounds the Founder's Garden between Polett Walk and Liacouras Walk. A renovated plaza and Founder's Garden opened in 2017, featuring a large bronze owl statue, a water wall, and an inlaid Temple T (the university's logo) in the brickwork of the plaza.

Liacouras Walk, named after Temple President Peter J. Liacouras, is the campus' main internal north/south pedestrian corridor. It runs through the campus parallel to Broad Street and was once part of Park Avenue. It intersects Polett Walk, the east/west pedestrian corridor where a segment of Berks Street once stood. The Conwell Inn, the university's on-campus hotel, is located at this intersection.

Past Polett Walk, the facade of 1810 Liacouras Walk is the only remnant of old Park Avenue rowhomes, most of which were demolished in the 20th century.

Temple offers eight residence halls. In 2023, 4,231 students lived in Temple-owned and -sponsored housing.

==== Other campuses ====
The Health Sciences Campus in North Philadelphia covers about 20 acres and extends to either side of North Broad Street from Allegheny Avenue to just above Tioga Street. This location is the site of the Samaritan Hospital, founded by Russell Conwell in 1892. The campus is home to Temple University Hospital, a teaching hospital; the Lewis Katz School of Medicine; the School of Pharmacy; the Maurice H. Kornberg School of Dentistry; and the College of Public Health.

Podiatric Medicine Campus is located at 8th and Race Streets. The Foot and Ankle Institute, the School of Podiatric Medicine, as well as the Shoe Museum, are at this location.

Center City Campus is across the street from Philadelphia City Hall. The campus offers undergraduate and graduate courses and full degree programs in the evening, as well as non-credit workshops and seminars.

Ambler Campus, originally a junior college, has 325 faculty and 4,600 students, with bachelor's and master's degree programs on a site with a 187-acre (757,000 m^{2}) arboretum, 13 miles (21 km) from Temple's main campus in Ambler, Pennsylvania.

Temple University Harrisburg (TUH), located in Harrisburg, Pennsylvania, has a variety of graduate degree programs, certificate and professional development programs. The campus has an evening and weekend course schedule designed for working adults. The campus is located within the Strawberry Square complex.

=== International campuses ===
==== Temple University, Japan Campus ====
Temple University, Japan Campus (TUJ) is a branch campus in Setagaya-ku, Tokyo, Japan just outside of Shibuya and in Fushimi-ku, Kyoto. Temple University Japan was the oldest and largest campus of any foreign university in Japan. TUJ students are taught in English and receive a degree from the main campus in Philadelphia. In 2024, the campus had 2,575 undergraduate students and 233 graduate students in addition to numerous students in non-degree programs and educational experiences.

==== Temple University Rome ====
In 1966, Temple established its first campus in Rome in the Villa Caproni, just north of Piazza del Popolo along the Tiber river. The Villa Caproni is the historic home of Giovanni Battista Caproni. Its facilities included a 15,000-volume library, a computing center, academic classrooms, art and architecture studios, an art gallery and student lounges.

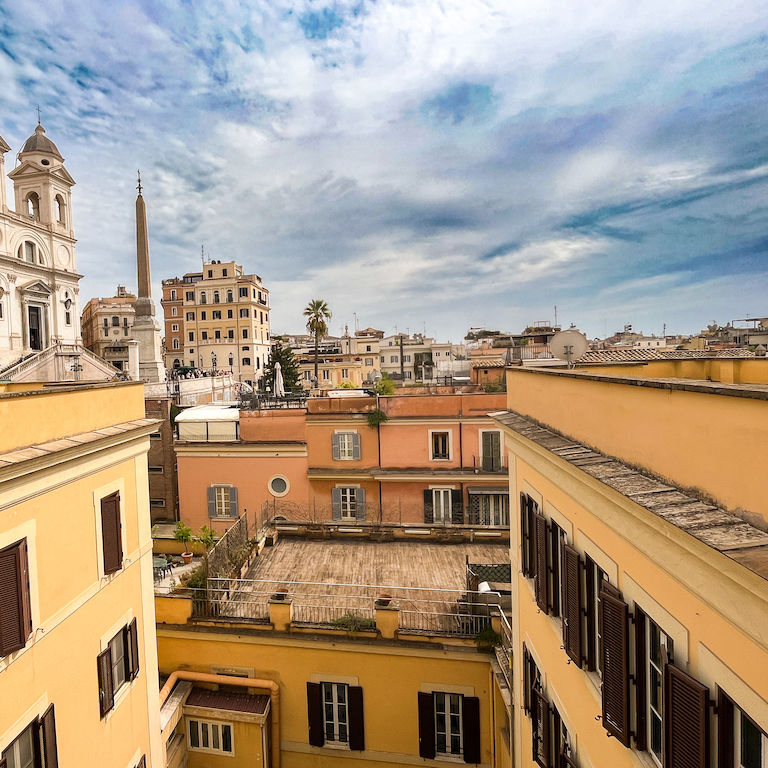
Temple University Rome

In the Fall of 2024, Temple Rome moved to a new, central location, establishing its new campus at Piazza di Spagna—one of the most notable landmarks in the Eternal City and a UNESCO World Heritage Site. Facilities include classrooms, art studios and an art gallery, a science lab, a conference center, a library, and open-air terraces and a courtyard for events. Additionally, it will feature full disability access and a new 50-bed residence hall.

=== Campus police ===
The Temple University Police department is the largest university police force in the United States, with 130 campus police officers, including supervisors and detectives.

=== Sustainability ===
The Office of Sustainability was established on July 1, 2008, as a central resource focusing on four key areas: operations, academics, research, and outreach and engagement.

The Ambler campus' "Ambler College", which is home to the Community and Regional Planning, Landscape Architecture, and Horticulture Departments, changed its name in 2009 to the School of Environmental Design. The campus is also home to the Center for Sustainable Communities, a Sustainability-based research center.

Since 2008, the university has enacted policies that include purchasing from green vendors and conserving water and energy across campus; offered 46 undergraduate courses, 22 graduate courses and 12 general education courses focusing on the environment and sustainability; set in place programs to administer grants and offer incentives for any research related to the environment or sustainability; and offered programs to help create a green culture, both at Temple and beyond.

=== 21st century campus development ===
In 2014, Temple University unveiled "Visualize Temple," a campus development plan, with signature projects including a new library and quad in the heart of campus. A companion project, Verdant Temple, was announced in 2015 as a university strategy for updating and beautifying the school's open spaces, walkways and landscaping.

==== Projects ====
In January 2006, the university opened the TECH Center, a 75,000 sq ft (7,000 m^{2}) technology facility.

The Architecture building opened in January 2012. The design incorporates a glass curtain wall exterior "skin" that allows daylight into interior studios and classrooms while also providing views of the surrounding urban environment. The open plan of the structure enables collaboration within the design studios.

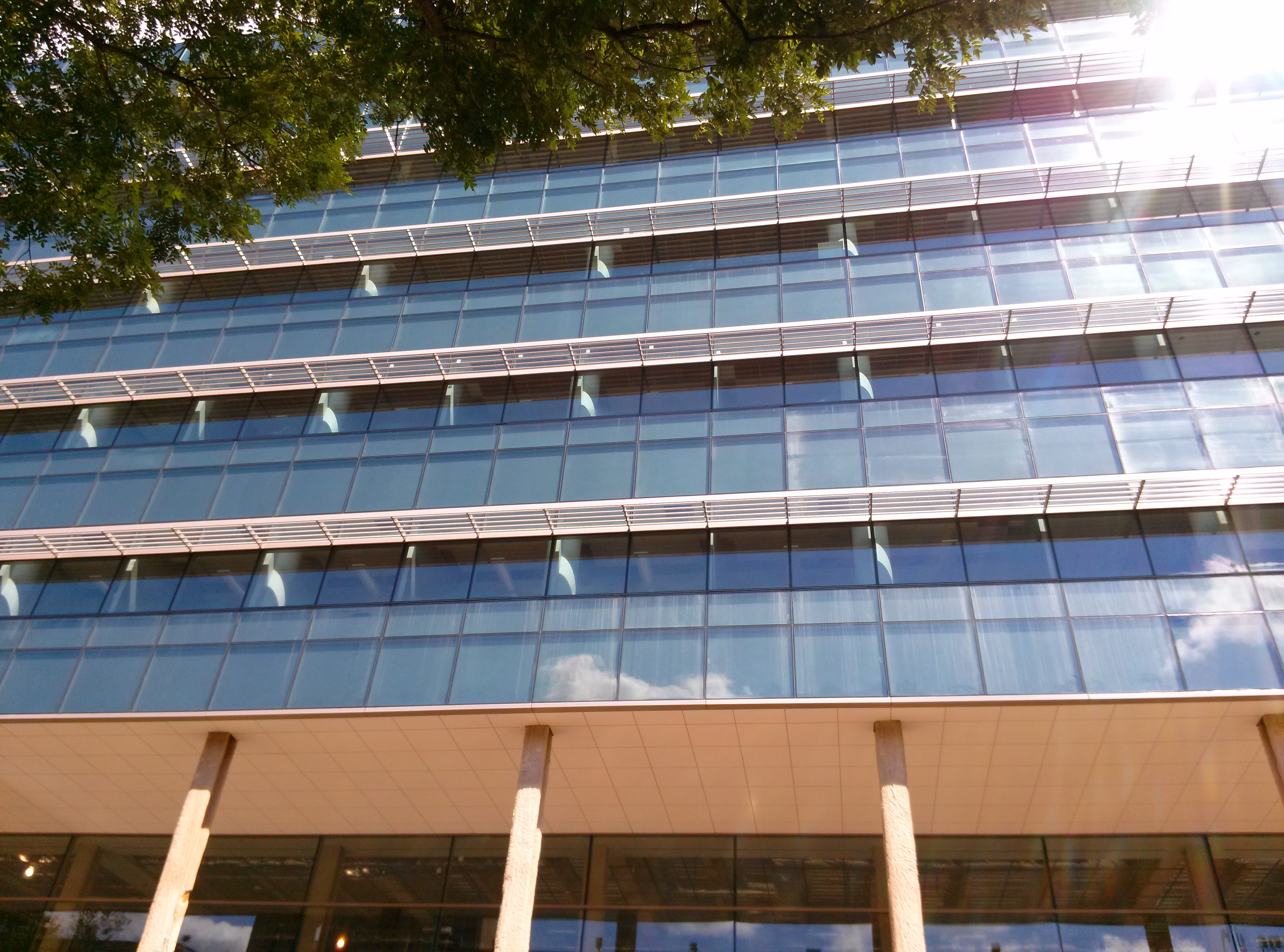
The Science and Education Research Center (SERC)

The Science and Education Research Center (SERC) was completed in spring of 2014. The Project has attained LEED Gold Certification.

In November 2024, Temple announced the development of a new home for the Klein College of Media and Communication and the Center for the Performing and Cinematic Arts. It will be a 199,000-square-foot facility west of Broad Street across from the entrance to Polett Walk. It will include several new theatres, a student media center, and a virtual reality/innovation lab.

==== Libraries ====
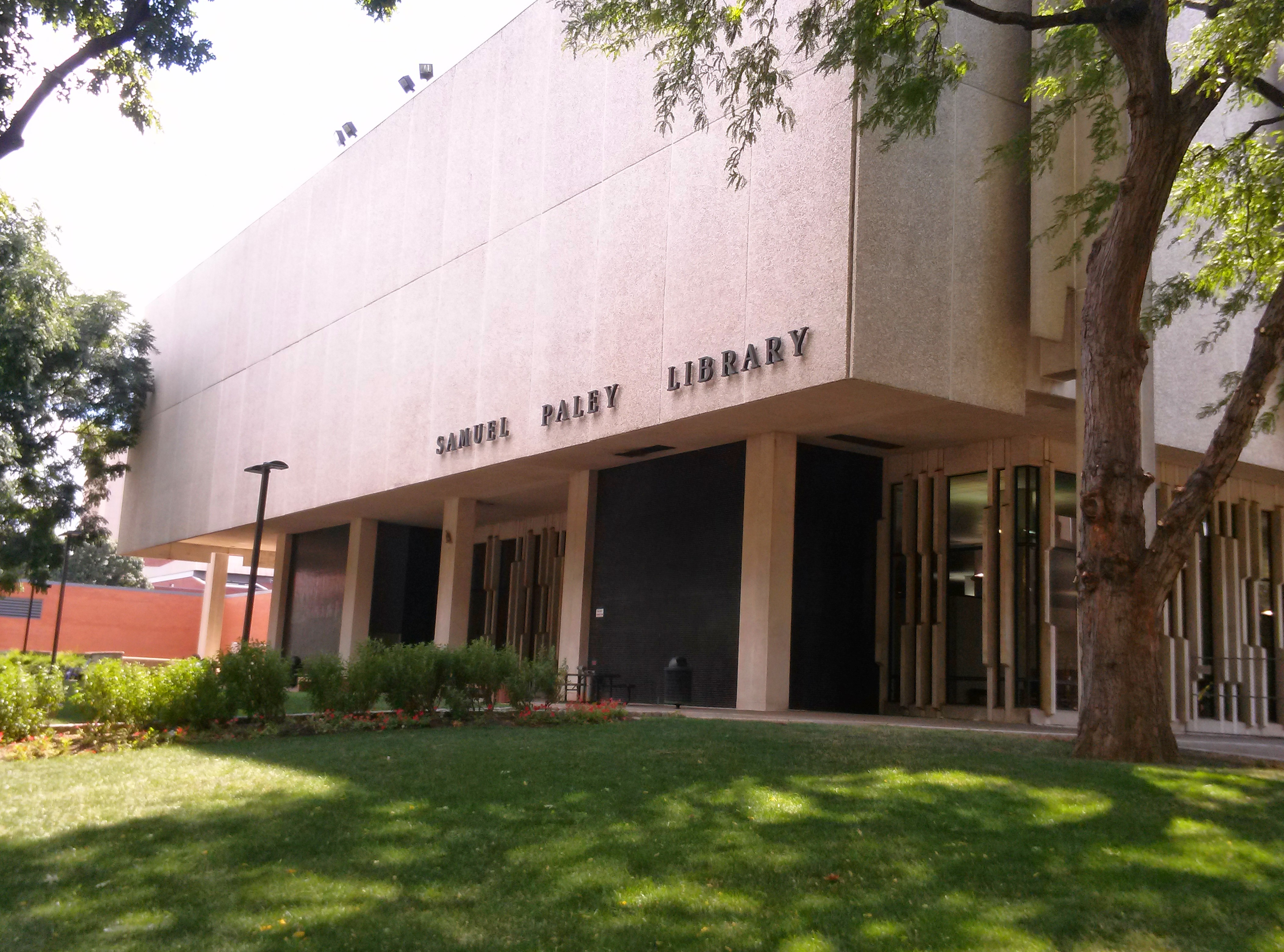
The former Samuel L. Paley Library

Sullivan Hall (then Sullivan Memorial Library) served as Temple's first free-standing library. President Franklin D. Roosevelt attended its dedication ceremony on February 22, 1936. Sullivan Hall houses the Charles L. Blockson Afro-American Collection.

In 1966, the university library moved one block east to the Samuel L. Paley Library. It was named for Sam Paley, Philadelphia cigar manufacturer and philanthropist. Its brutalist architecture and large concrete facade matched the neighboring Bell Tower and served as a campus landmark. It was closed as a library in 2019 and repurposed for the School of Public Health.

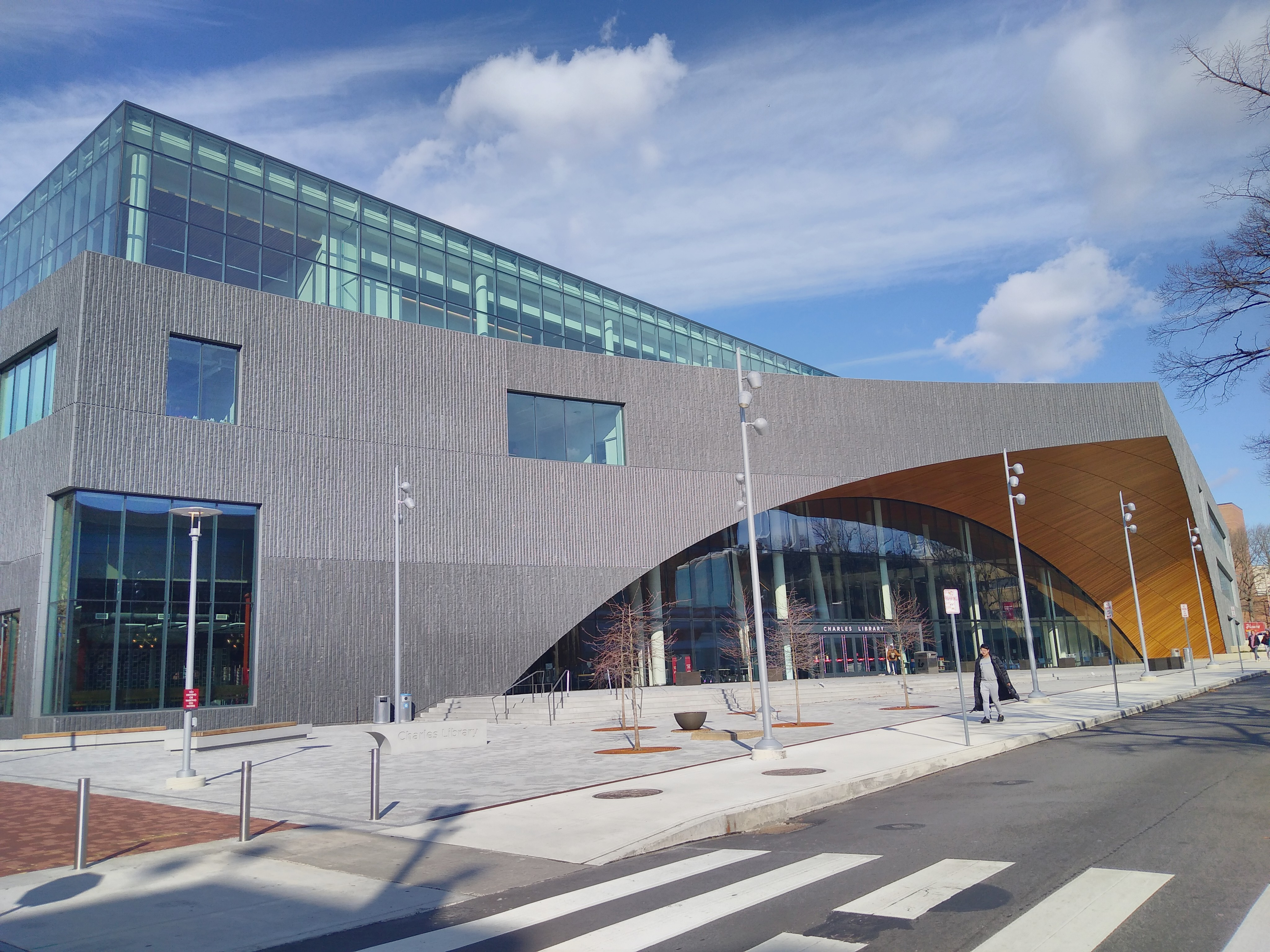
Charles Library

In 2019, the university opened Charles Library, a four-story tall study facility. The building was designed by international architectural design office, Snøhetta. As of 2020, the library holdings amounted to 4 million physical items, including 1.5 million books, and 1.5 million electronic books. The library includes both an automated search and retrieval system and browsable stacks for physical volumes. The library is open to the general public.

== Academics ==
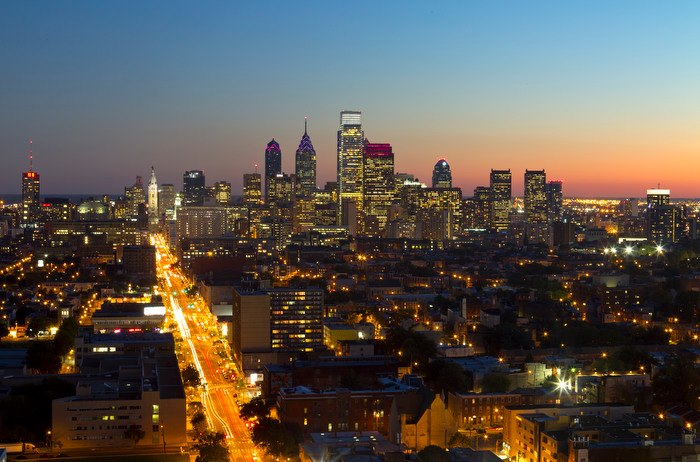
Philadelphia skyline, looking south from Temple University's Morgan Hall on Broad Street

Temple University is one of six universities in Pennsylvania classified among "R1: Doctoral Universities – Very high research activity." Temple has more than 650 degree programs at 17 schools and colleges, and five professional schools: dentistry, law, medicine, pharmacy, and podiatric medicine.

=== Schools and colleges ===
==== Tyler School of Art and Architecture ====
The Tyler School of Art and Architecture was founded in Elkins Park, Pennsylvania in the 1930s, when Stella Elkins Tyler donated her estate to Temple University. Temple's Architecture program, founded in 1969, joined the school in 1990s. In 2016, four more Temple programs joined Tyler: City & Regional Planning, Community Development, Horticulture, and Landscape Architecture.

Tyler moved to a state-of-the-art facility at Temple's Main Campus in Philadelphia in 2009, which is connected to the Boyer College of Music and Dance's Presser Hall. In 2019, the school expanded its name, becoming the Tyler School of Art and Architecture.

Tyler was ranked number 15 in fine art schools in the United States by U.S. News & World Report in 2016.

==== Fox School of Business ====
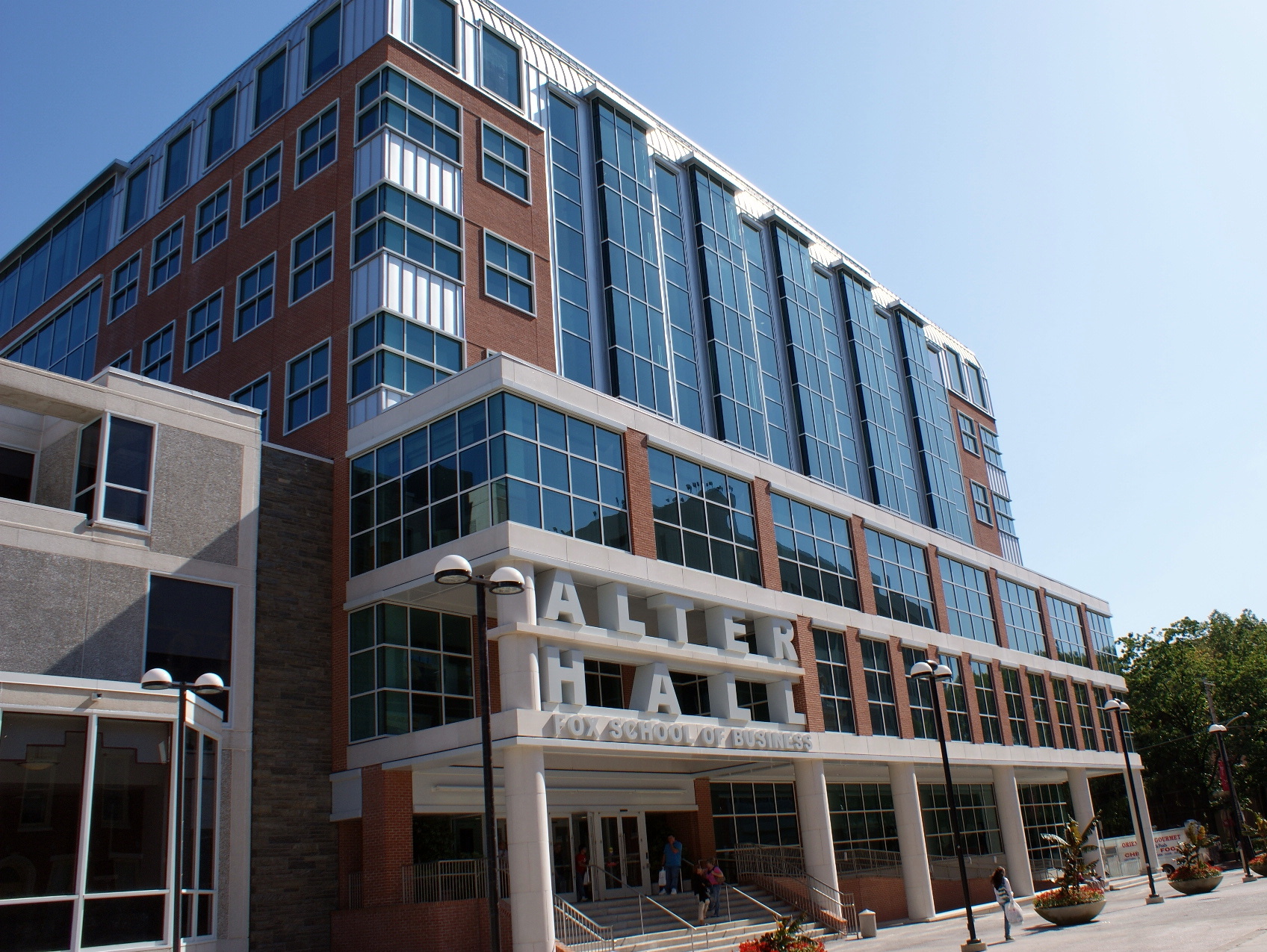
Alter Hall at Fox School of Business and Management

The Fox School offers 15 undergraduate majors, 19 minors, 10 professional master's programs, and two PhD programs, and the school has a variety of international partnerships. Established in 1918, it was named in honor of Richard J. Fox in 1999.

It ranked in the top 30 in the nation in the 2017 Times Higher Ed World University Rankings and top 80 in the world for undergraduate studies. The Fox School of Business is housed in Alter Hall and 1810 Liacouras Walk.

On March 9, 2020, the Department of Veterans Affairs suspended G.I. Bill reimbursement eligibility for Temple University and several other schools due to what the V.A. said were "erroneous, deceptive, or misleading enrollment and advertising practices", giving the schools 60 days to take "corrective action". The Philadelphia Inquirer states that the action is a result of misreporting by the Fox School of Business. The VA withdrew its threat of sanctions in July 2020.

==== Maurice H. Kornberg School of Dentistry ====
The Kornberg School of Dentistry, established in 1863, is the second oldest dental school in continuous existence in the United States. The school's clinic offers services including routine dental care and prevention to children's dentistry, orthodontics, emergency care, and implants. The Kornberg School of Dentistry is located at Broad and Allegheny Streets in North Philadelphia, north of Main Campus.

==== College of Education and Human Development ====
The College of Education and Human Development has more than 2,140 students (undergraduate, graduate programs, and non-matriculated students). Founded in 1919, the college is organized into three departments: Teaching & Learning, Policy, Organizational & Leadership Studies, and Psychological Studies in Education. The college has a longstanding relationship with the School District of Philadelphia, helping to teach and prepare future educators for the city. The College of Education is housed in Ritter Hall.

==== College of Engineering ====
The College of Engineering at Temple University includes five departments: Bioengineering, Civil & Environmental Engineering, Electrical & Computer Engineering, Mechanical Engineering, and Center for Engineering, Management & Technology. The college offers eight undergraduate programs (B.S.) and seven graduate programs (M.S., Ph.D.). The College of Engineering's building is on 12th and Norris Street.

==== Beasley School of Law ====
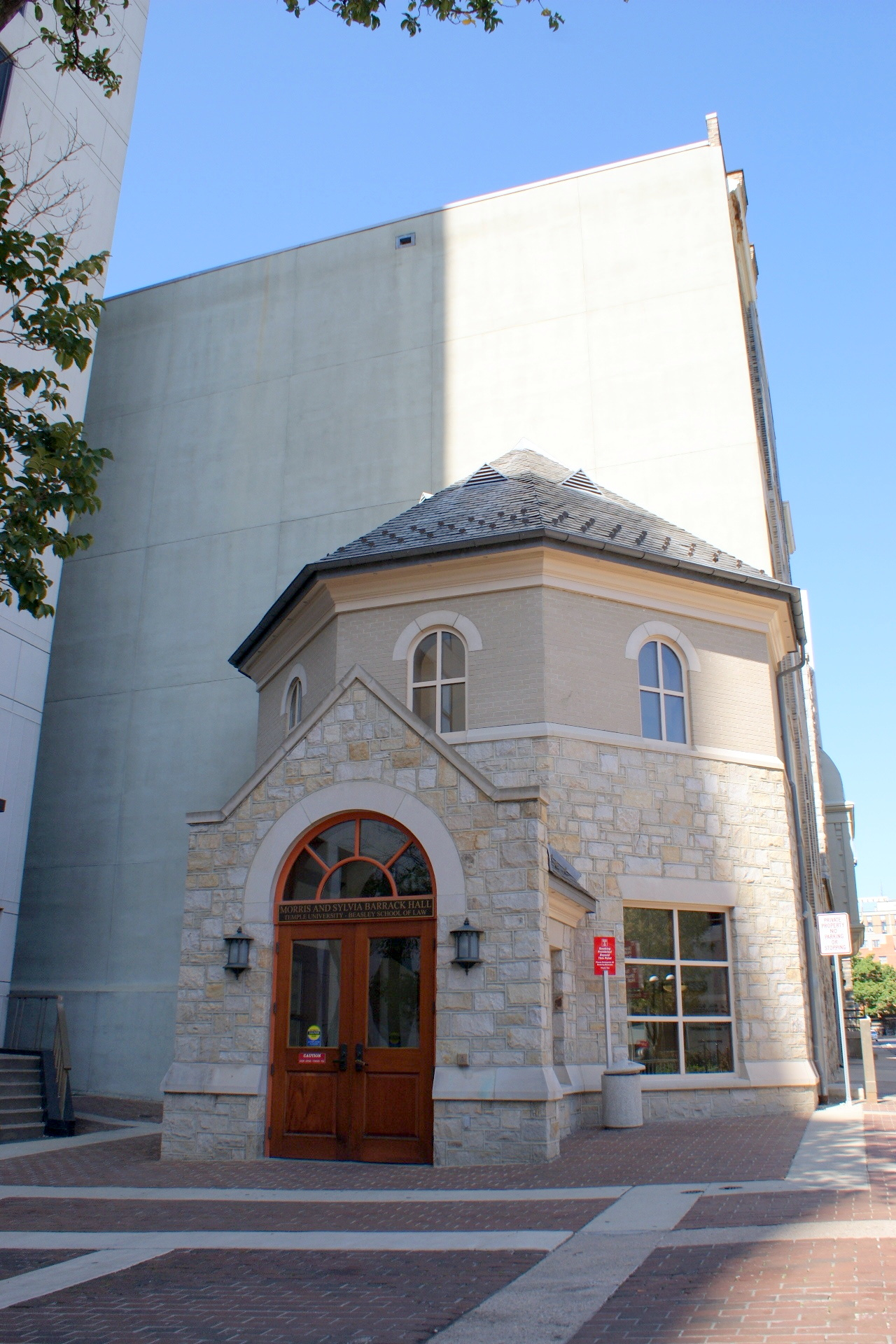
Barrack Hall at Temple University Beasley School of Law

The Beasley School of Law was founded in 1895 as Temple College's Department of Law. The school's first Dean, Henry S. Borneman, proposed to Russell Conwell that he organize evening courses in the study of law for students wishing to prepare for the bar examination. The Law School graduated its first class (of 16) in 1901, and received accreditation from the Pennsylvania State Board of Bar Examiners in 1907.

The school has had many homes over the years, both on Temple's Main Campus and in Center City: these included a location over a shoe repair shop, another above the noisy printing presses of the Philadelphia Ledger, and one in the Gimbels Department Store (where students had to walk through the retail merchandise floors to get to class). In 2013, the Sheller Center for Social Justice at Temple Law School was created. The center partners with local community advocacy organizations to address civil access to justice issues confronting underserved populations. The Beasley School of Law is housed in Klein Hall, Shusterman Hall, and Barrack Hall.

With an enrollment of approximately 650 students in the fall of 2023, the school trains students with programs focused on trial advocacy, transnational law, and taxation, among others. The school offers full- and part-time programs, offering evening classes for working students. As of 2024, U.S. News & World Report ranked the school the tied for 54th best law school in the United States.

==== College of Liberal Arts ====
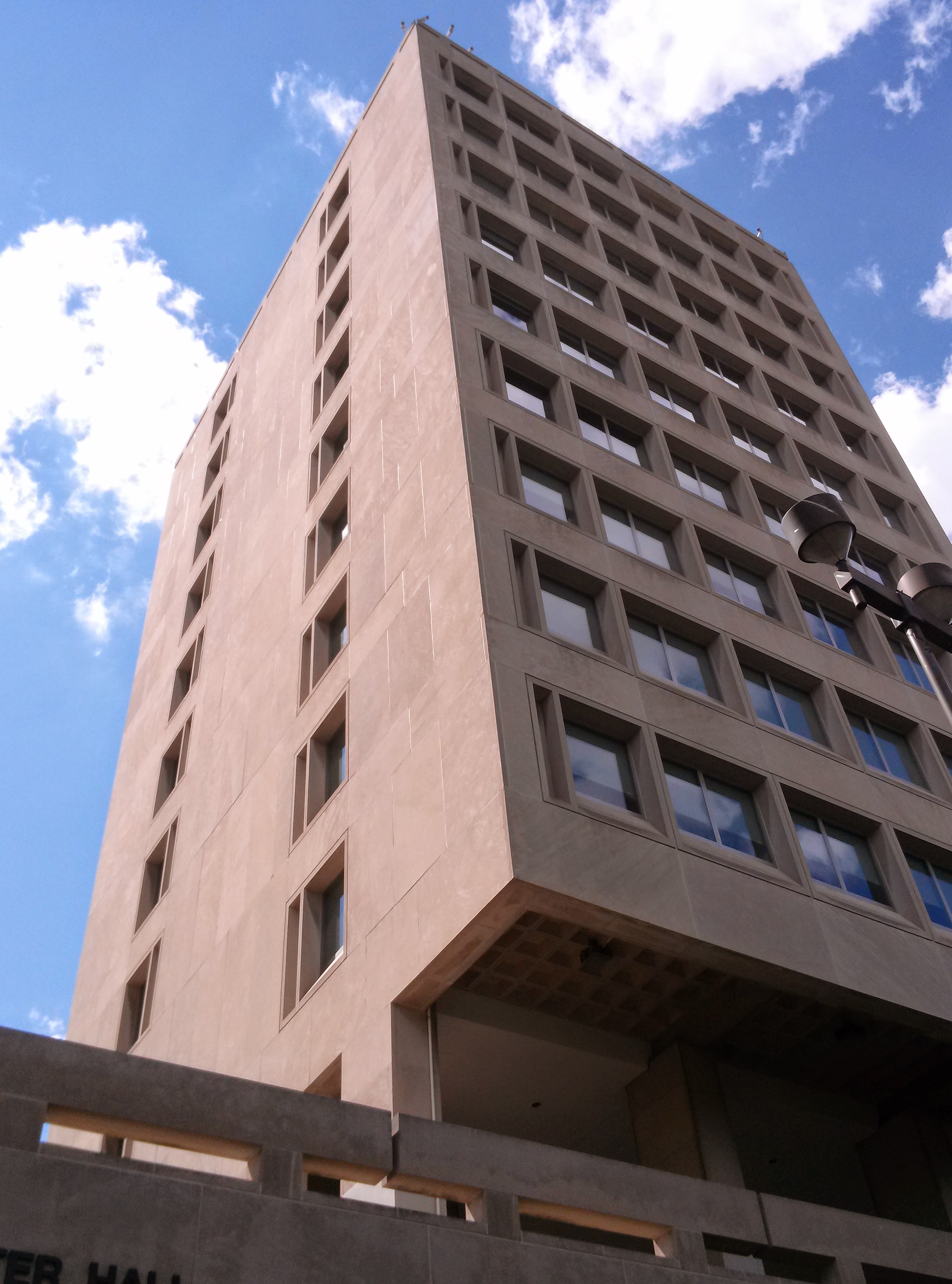
Gladfelter Hall at the College of Liberal Arts

The College of Liberal Arts at Temple University includes 28 academic departments, offering 35 undergraduate majors and 36 minors. The College of Liberal Arts is housed in Mazur (formerly Anderson) and Gladfelter Halls.

The Criminal Justice department is one of the leading criminal justice programs in the United States. The college offers 15 master's degrees and 13 doctoral programs.

==== Klein College of Media and Communication ====
Founded in 1927, the Klein College of Media and Communication (formerly the School of Media and Communication) is one of the largest and most comprehensive schools of media and communication in the country. The school has about 3,000 undergraduate and graduate students, more than 20,000+ alumni, and more than 60 full-time faculty members. The school expanded to the School of Communications and Theater in 1967. The Klein College of Media and Communication is housed in Annenberg Hall.

The School of Media and Communication was renamed the Klein College of Media and Communication on in 2017, in tribute to broadcasting pioneer Lew Klein.

==== Lewis Katz School of Medicine ====
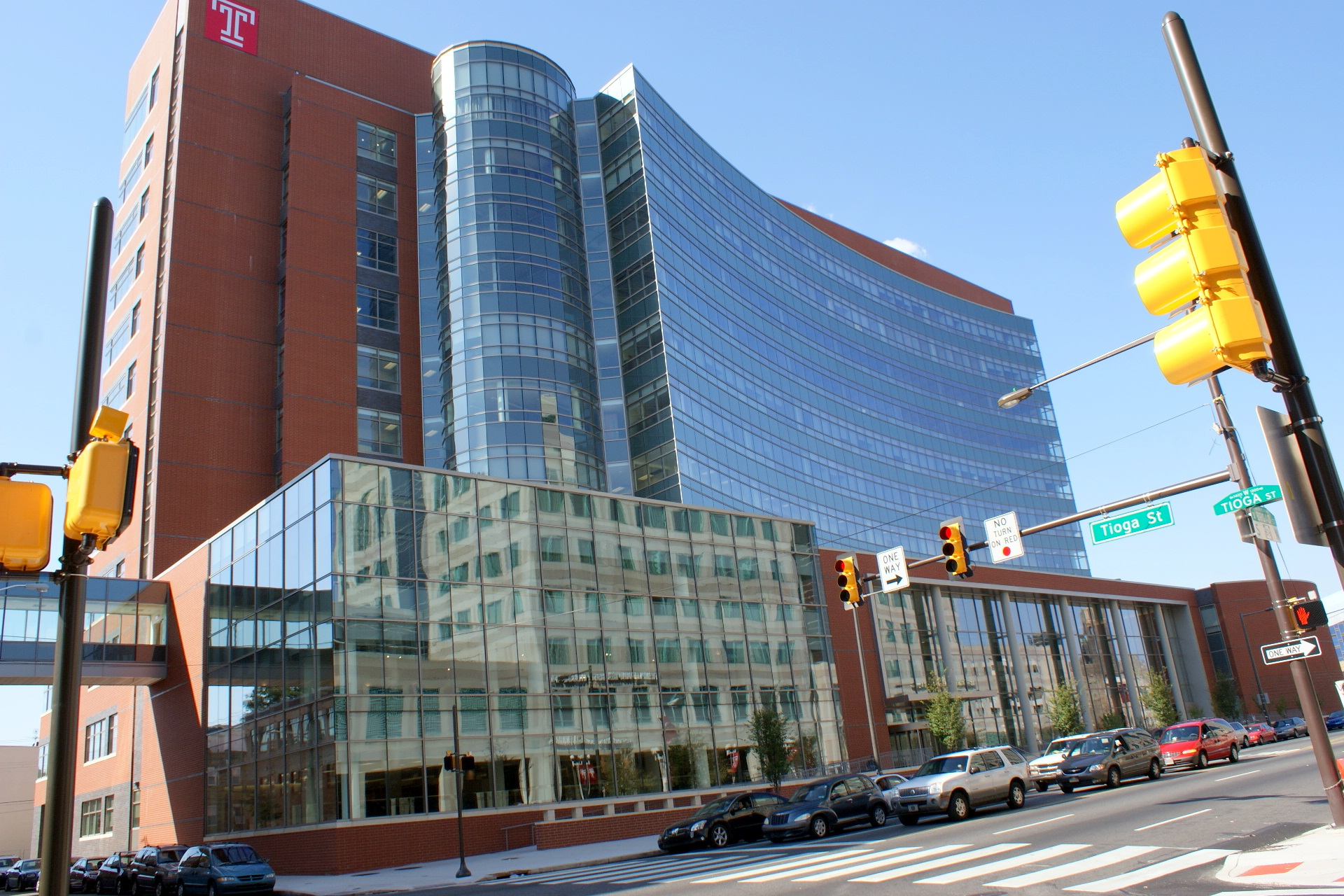
Katz School of Medicine

The Lewis Katz School of Medicine was founded in 1901, making it one of the oldest schools at Temple University. Classes were held in College Hall (now Barrack Hall) and clinical instruction was given at the Samaritan Hospital (now Temple University Hospital). It was Pennsylvania's first co-educational medical school and is one of seven medical schools in the state that confers the Doctor of Medicine degree. The Lewis Katz School of Medicine is housed at the Medical Education and Research Building (MERB) on the Health Sciences Campus in North Philadelphia and at St. Luke's University Health Network Regional Campus in Bethlehem, Pennsylvania.

In July 2014, Lewis Katz School of Medicine scientists were the first to remove HIV from human cells.

In October 2015, the school was officially named the Lewis Katz School of Medicine at Temple University in honor of Temple alumnus and former trustee Lewis Katz.

==== Boyer College of Music and Dance ====
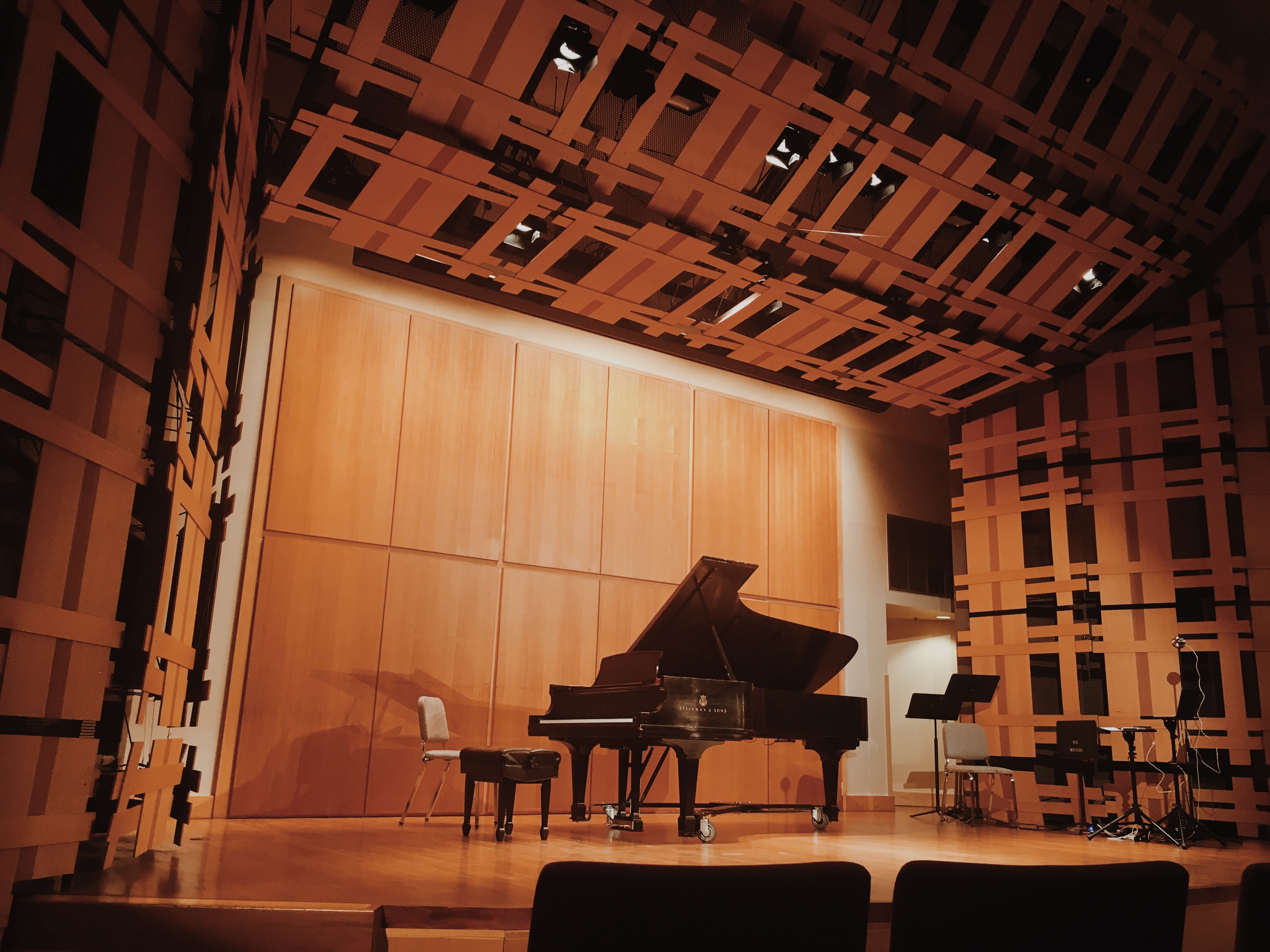
Rock Hall Auditorium, one of the Boyer College of Music and Dance's performance venues

Founded in 1962, the Esther Boyer College of Music and Dance is part of the Center for Performing and Cinematic Arts at Temple University, along with the School of Theater, Film and Media Arts. The Boyer College of Music and Dance is housed in Presser Hall, Rock Hall, and Ritter Annex.

Areas of study include Instrumental and Voice studies, Jazz studies, Music Theory, Music History, Music Composition, Music Technology, Music Therapy, Music Education, and Dance. Boyer offers 500 concerts, performances, master classes, lectures, faculty and guest artist recitals each year, most of which are free and open to the public. Venues for ensemble performances include the Temple Performing Arts Center, Kimmel Center for the Performing Arts, Lincoln Center's Alice Tully Hall and Jazz at Lincoln Center.

The college's record label, BCM&D Records, was founded in 2009 and has garnered five Grammy nominations.

==== School of Pharmacy ====
The Temple University School of Pharmacy (TUSP), located at Temple's Health Science Campus, is one of six schools of pharmacy in Pennsylvania conferring the Doctor of Pharmacy (Pharm.D.) degree. It also confers the Doctor of Philosophy (Ph.D.) and Master of Science M.S. degrees in pharmaceutical sciences.

==== School of Podiatric Medicine ====
Temple's School of Podiatric Medicine is a school of podiatry. The school's Foot and Ankle Institute is the largest podiatric medical treatment facility anywhere, logging more than 40,000 patient visits annually. Students also train through programs through Temple University Health System. The School of Podiatric Medicine is housed in Chinatown.

==== College of Public Health ====
The College of Public Health's department was formerly housed inside the Bell Building (TECH Center). It is currently housed inside the expanded and renovated Paley Hall (formerly Paley Library). On October 10, 2025, it was announced that the college would be named in honor of Temple alumnus and trustee Christopher M. Barnett. On September 8, 2026, this renaming was reversed, and Barnett resigned from Temple's board of trustees, in light of a federal criminal investigation into Barnett and his company, ABA Centers of America. Barnett and university leadership also mutually agreed to void a pledge Barnett had made to donate an additional $55 million to the school. The College of Public Health had previously named an autism-focused research, training, and diagnostic hub after ABA Centers of America following a $1 million donation from Barnett in October 2022.

==== College of Science and Technology ====
Temple University's College of Science and Technology (CST) houses the departments of Biology, Chemistry, Computer & Information Sciences, Earth & Environmental Science, Mathematics, and Physics. It is one of the largest schools or colleges of its kind in the Philadelphia region with more than 230 faculty and 4,000 undergraduate students.

The College of Science and Technology offers bachelor's, master's, and doctoral degrees in all six departments as well as science with teaching bachelor's degrees through the TUteach program. CST's advanced Science Education and Research Center (SERC), which opened in 2014, is 247,000 square feet research center, home to 7 research center and institutes. SERC has 52 research labs and 16 teaching rooms, and cost $137 million.

The College of Science and Technology's Biology department is housed in the BioLife building, while the Chemistry and Earth & Environmental Science departments are housed in Beury Hall. The Mathematics department is housed in Wachman Hall, while the Physics and Computer Science departments are housed in SERC.

==== School of Social Work ====
Temple's School of Social Work, part of the College of Public Health, offers full-time, part-time and online programs. It had an enrollment of more than 600 students in the fall of 2017. The School of Social Work is housed in the Ritter Annex.

==== School of Sport, Tourism, and Hospitality Management ====
Established in 1998, the School of Sport, Tourism and Hospitality Management (STHM) is the largest provider of talent for the sport, recreation, entertainment, event, tourism and hospitality industries in the greater Philadelphia region. Before STHM's founding, Temple began offering programs in its fields since 1908. The school houses the Sport Industry Research Center and the U.S.–Asia Center for Tourism & Hospitality Research. In 2024, three new undergraduate degree programs were offered: Bachelor of Science in Sport and Entertainment Management, Bachelor of Science in Tourism, Hospitality and Event Management and Bachelor of Science in Multidisciplinary Studies in Sport, Tourism, Hospitality and Event Management. The School of Sport, Tourism, and Hospitality Management is housed in Speakman Hall.

==== School of Theater, Film and Media Arts ====
Temple's School of Theater, Film and Media Arts (TFMA) is part of the Center for the Performing and Cinematic Arts at Temple University, which also includes the Boyer College of Music and Dance.

Created in 2012, TFMA offers BA and BFA programs in 13 concentrations in disciplines from musical theater to cinematography, screenwriting to theater design. Graduate programs include MFA programs in Film and Media Arts, Musical Theater Collaboration, Acting, Design, Directing and Playwriting, as well as MA programs in Media Arts and Musical Theater Studies, and a PhD in Documentary Arts and Visual Research.

=== Foreign study ===
Temple offers undergraduate and graduate programs at its campus in Japan, study-abroad opportunities at its campuses in Rome and Tokyo, and semester and summer programs in London, Rome, Japan, Dublin, Germany, France, China, South Africa, Spain, Ecuador, and Australia. Temple University has a global internship program, offering internships in Spain, Costa Rica, Australia, India, Chile, China, Singapore, and various U.S. cities

=== Rankings ===
Academic rankings

National
- Forbes: 192
- U.S. News & World Report: 102 (tie)
- Washington Monthly: 144
- WSJ/College Pulse: 166

Global
- ARWU: 401–500
- QS: 721-730
- THE: 351–400
- U.S. News & World Report: 360 (tie)

In U.S. News & World Report 2024 rankings, Temple is tied for 89th among all national universities. Temple undergraduate college is among the top colleges profiled in The Princeton Review's The Best 382 colleges (2018). Temple's Arts and Humanities faculty, Social Science and Management faculty, Life Science, and Medicine faculty are ranked 401–450, 451–500, and 369th respectively in the world in 2024 by QS World University Rankings. Additionally, Temple's Hospitality and Tourism Management faculty is ranked 9th in the world in 2024 by ARWU.

Forbes ranked Temple 192nd out of the top 500 rated private and public colleges and universities in America for the 2024–25 report. Temple was also ranked 87th among public colleges and 76th in the Northeast.

In 2024, Washington Monthly ranked Temple 144th among 438 national universities in the U.S. based on Temple's contribution to the public good, as measured by social mobility, research, and promoting public service.

According to the National Science Foundation, Temple spent $301.395 billion on research and development in 2022, ranking it 98th out of 899 institutions.

== Student life ==
Undergraduate demographics as of fall 2023
Race and ethnicity	Total
White	46%
Black	17%
Asian	15%
Hispanic	10%
Two or more races	4%
International student	3%
Unknown	3%
Economic diversity
Low-income (Note: The percentage of students who received an income-based federal Pell grant intended for low-income students.)	30%
Affluent (Note: The percentage of students who are a part of the American middle class at the bare minimum.)	70%

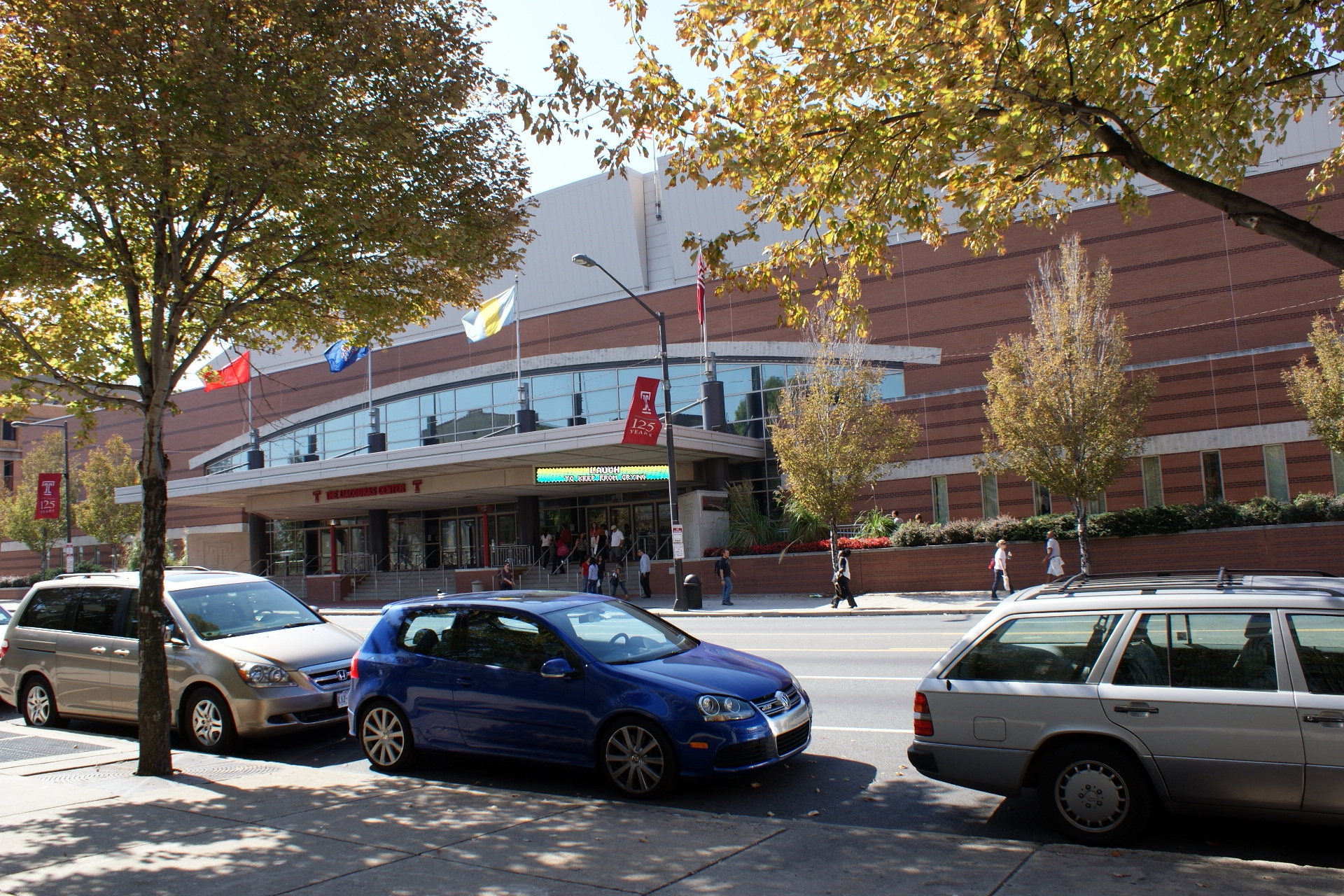
Liacouras Center

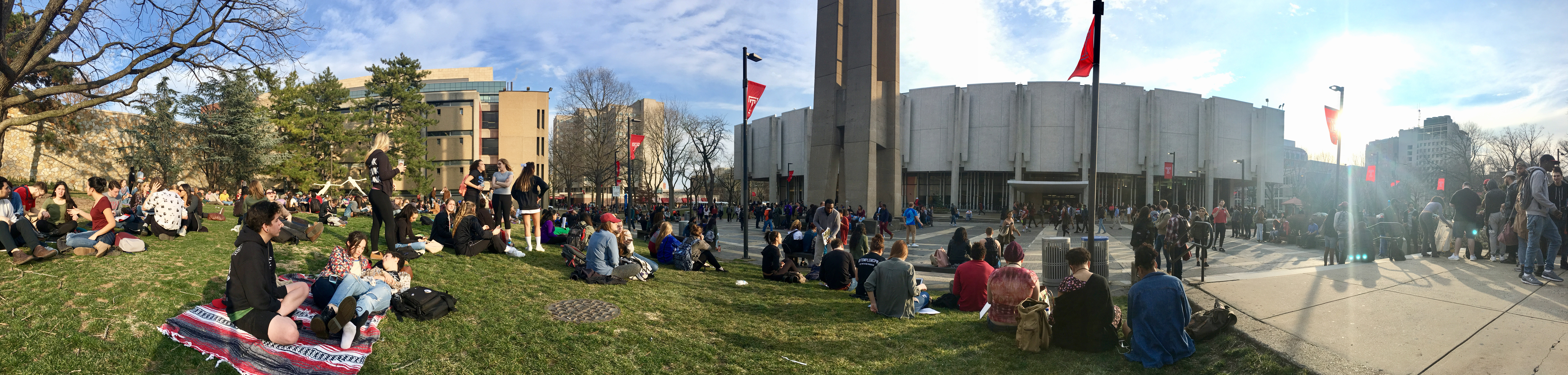
Panorama of Beury Beach, the Bell Tower, and Paley Library

As of 2023, 13,764 students live on or around Temple's main campus. University officials have tried various strategies, including building facilities, to encourage students, faculty, and staff to live and work nearby.

The main recreational facility on Main Campus is the Howard Gittis Student Center, which has a movie theater, food court, underground multi-purpose room, game room, computer lounge, and meeting and office space for student groups and organizations. Exercise facilities include the Independence Blue Cross Student Recreation Center (commonly referred to as IBC), which provides 59,000 square feet (5,500 m^{2}) of fitness facilities; the Student Pavilion, a 4-court field house for volleyball, basketball, badminton, floor hockey, indoor soccer, tennis, and golf; and the Geasey Field Complex, 98,300-square-foot multisport turf field and seven tennis courts. Pearson-McGonigle Hall also has a recreational basketball court on the third floor and a pool in the basement.

In 2017, the Aramark Student Training and Recreation Complex (STAR) was opened at 15th Street and Montgomery Avenue. The facility includes a climbing wall, weight room, and an outdoor track. There is also academic classrooms for the College of Public Health, administrative offices, a juice bar, and a 75-yard turf field.

The Recreation Center is part of the Liacouras Center, which also includes the home court of the Temple basketball team and various entertainment venues.

=== Traditions ===
==== School colors ====
Cherry and white are the official school colors of Temple University. Temple was the first school in the nation officially to use cherry as one of its colors. Cherry (both the color and less often, the fruit) is a common motif at Temple, from the Cherry Crusade fan club to the Cherry and White Directory. In 2008, Temple standardized the cherry color to be Pantone Matching System (PMS) 201.

==== The Temple "T" ====
Temple "T" logo

The university's symbol, the Temple "T", was designed by students in a graphic arts and design class in the Tyler School of Art and Architecture in 1983. It is cherry and white. The "T" represents strength and positive character, with the open ends showing the free exchange of ideas that is the hallmark of a Temple education.

==== The Owl ====
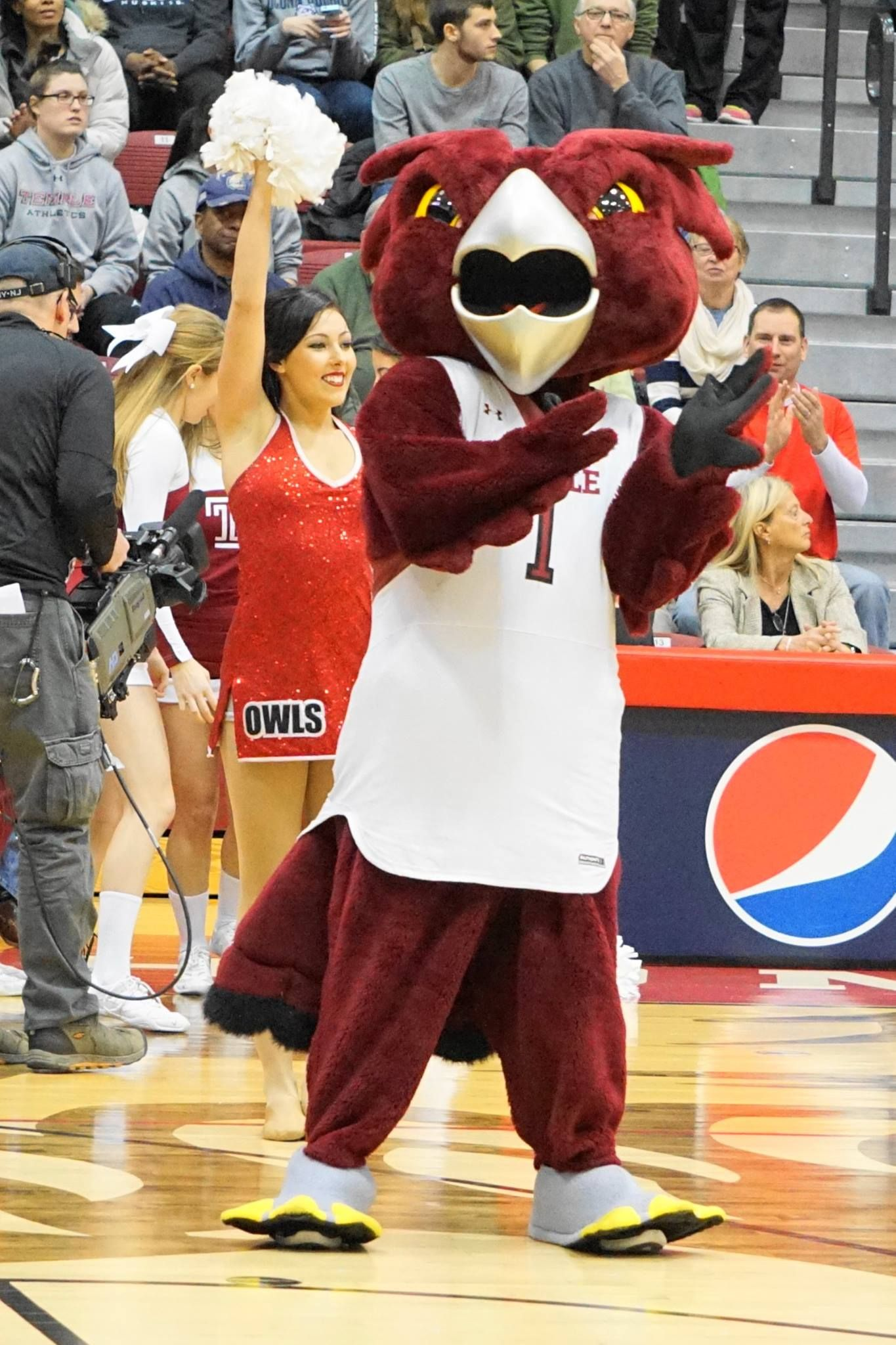
Hooter, Temple's mascot

The owl has been the symbol and mascot for Temple University since its founding in the 1880s, making it the first school in the United States to adopt the owl as its symbol. The nocturnal hunter symbolized Temple's early mission as a night school for ambitious young people of limited means. Russell Conwell encouraged these students, saying, "The owl of the night makes the eagle of the day." In addition to being a universal symbol for wisdom and knowledge, the owl was the symbol of Athena, Greek goddess of wisdom and warfare. Due to this, the owl was decided to be a suitable mascot for not only the university as a center of learning, but for the athletic teams as well.

In 1977, Temple introduced "Victor T. Owl", a costumed mascot, which was then renamed Hooter in 1984, and has remained Temple's mascot at sports games and events since. Stella, Temple's live owl mascot, was hatched in 2009 in Washington State and raised by a master falconer. She arrived in Pennsylvania in 2011 and lives in the Elmwood Park Zoo in Norristown, Pennsylvania. Stella is one of two live owl mascots in Division I athletics, the other being Florida Atlantic University's Hera. Temple University is one of three schools in the American Athletic Conference to use the owl as a mascot, alongside Florida Atlantic University and Rice University.

=== Fraternities and sororities ===
31 Greek organizations are part of the Temple University Greek Association, with 938 members in the fall of 2024.

=== Student organizations ===
Temple University has more than 450 student organizations for a variety of interests academic, professional, political and advocacy, service, religious, cultural and international, arts, entertainment, recreation and leisure, and media and publishing.

==== Temple University Graduate Students' Association ====
The Temple University Graduate Students' Association (TUGSA), which is affiliated with the American Federation of Teachers and the AFL-CIO, is the only recognized graduate student employee union in Pennsylvania. Formed in 1997, TUGSA is a union that advocates for graduate students that are employed by the university as teaching or research assistants.

==== Main Campus Program Board ====
The Main Campus Program Board is a student-run organization that plans the premiere events for the Temple student body. They specialize in large-scale events for the student community on Main Campus, organize trips to locations throughout the region, plan student Homecoming events including the annual Homecoming concert, and host speakers, comedians, and novel events.

==== Media ====
The Temple News is the editorially independent weekly newspaper of Temple University. It prints 5,000 copies to be distributed primarily on Temple's Main Campus every Tuesday. A staff of 25 plus more than 150 writers design, report and edit the 20-page paper. In 2008, the paper's website, temple-news.com, received the National Online Pacemaker Award from the Associated Collegiate Press. In 2015, the paper won the print counterpart, the National Pacemaker Award. In 2009, the paper's staff won eight Keystone Press Awards.

Templar, Temple University's annual undergraduate yearbook, was created in 1924. In 2017, the yearbook received a national second-place award from the American Scholastic Press Association.

WHIP, an acronym that stands for We Have Infinite Potential, is Temple University's student radio station. It started broadcasting using Carrier Current in the Student Center before moving its studios to the TECH center. WHIP also gets increased visibility in a top-five media market as one of iHeartRadio's top college radio stations.

Temple also has TUTV, a digital cable station that broadcasts to Philadelphia. TUTV features programs from Klein College School of Media and Communication, other colleges and schools at Temple, community and professional broadcasting partners.

== Athletics ==
Temple University's sports teams are the Owls, a name born from Temple's early days when it was a night school. The sports teams all participate in the NCAA's Division I and the American Conference (The American). The Owls moved after spending the previous 31 years in the Atlantic 10 Conference (A-10). The field hockey team are affiliate members of the Big East Conference. The Owls are also part of the Philadelphia Big 5, the Philadelphia-area basketball rivalry. Temple University was among the first institutions in the United States to sponsor extracurricular athletic activities for its students when both the football and basketball programs were inaugurated in 1894 under the direction of Coach Charles M. Williams.

=== Football ===
Temple's football program dates back to 1894 and currently plays Division I FBS football in the American Conference.

On December 17, 2012, Matt Rhule [pronounced rule] was named Temple's 26th head football coach. He had most recently served as the assistant offensive line coach with the New York Giants. Rhule was an assistant coach for the Owls for six seasons, ending in 2010–11 when the program went 9–4 and played in the fourth bowl game in school history, the Gildan New Mexico Bowl, where the Owls defeated Wyoming, 37–15 – Temple's first postseason victory since the 1979 Garden State Bowl. In 2015, they posted a school-record-tying 10 wins and 4 losses.

Temple posted another 10–4 record in 2016, when they won the 2016 American Athletic Conference Football Championship Game to secure its first conference championship since 1967. On December 13, 2016, Geoff Collins was named Temple's 27th head football coach. Before taking the position, Collins had served as defensive coordinator for the University of Florida Gators that ranked among the nation's best during his two seasons on staff. Collins took the Temple Owls to the Bad Boy Mowers Gasporilla Bowl in 2017 in which the Owls defeated the Florida International Golden Panthers 28 to 3.

=== Men's basketball ===
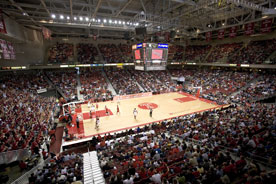
Temple University Liacouras Center

The Temple Men's basketball program was ranked fifth in all-time NCAA wins with 1,903 starting the 2017–2018 season. Only Kentucky, Kansas, North Carolina, and Duke had a higher total.

Temple is recognized as having won the first-ever National Collegiate basketball championship in 1938, under Coach James Usilton. That Owls team, which finished with a 23–2 record, won the inaugural National Invitation Tournament by routing Colorado, 60–36, in the championship final. Because the NCAA Tournament was not held until the following year, Temple's NIT championship earned the Owls the first national college basketball title. During the 1950s, the Temple basketball team made two NCAA Final Four appearances (1956 and 1958) under Head Coach Harry Litwack. Litwack would be inducted into the Basketball Hall of Fame after concluding a 21-year coaching career that included 373 wins.

Head Coach John Chaney, who is also a Hall of Fame coach, won a total of 724 career games and took Temple to the NCAA tournament 17 times. His 1987–88 Owls team entered the NCAA tournament ranked No. 1 in the country, and he has reached the Elite Eight on five occasions. He was consensus national coach of the year in 1988.

On April 10, 2006, University of Pennsylvania head coach and La Salle University alumnus Fran Dunphy was named the new Temple's men's head basketball coach after Chaney's retirement in conclusion of the 2006 season. Dunphy had coached the Quakers for 17 straight seasons prior to the move. Dunphy and the Owls won three straight Atlantic-10 tournaments in 2008, 2009 and 2010, with the third marking a conference-leading ninth A-10 title. In the 2011–12 season, the Owls won the A-10 regular season title.

== Alumni and faculty ==
There are more than 365,000 Temple alumni currently living in 50 states and 152 countries. As of 2024, the university's alumni include a Rhodes Scholar, five Marshall Scholars, and many Fulbright Scholars. Temple has many notable alumni, such as Bill Cosby, Bob Saget, Daryl Hall, John Oates, Irvin Kershner, Diplo, Karen Patricia Williams (women's cancer prevention) and Gertrude Moskowitz (foreign language teacher educator). Temple University employs over 3,100 educators and has a student to faculty ratio of 14:1.

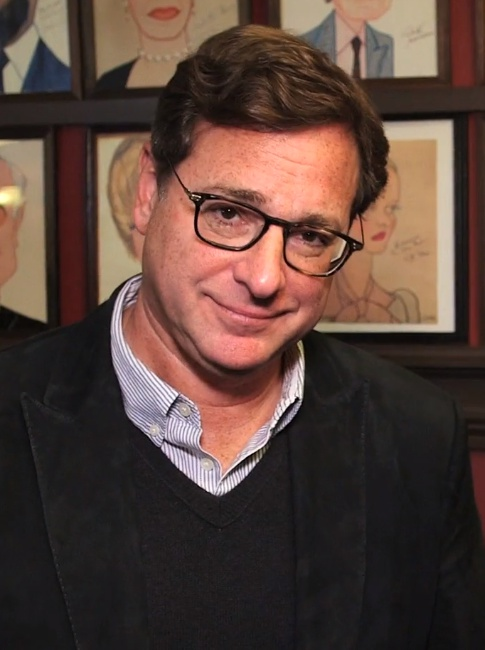
Bob Saget, actor and comedian

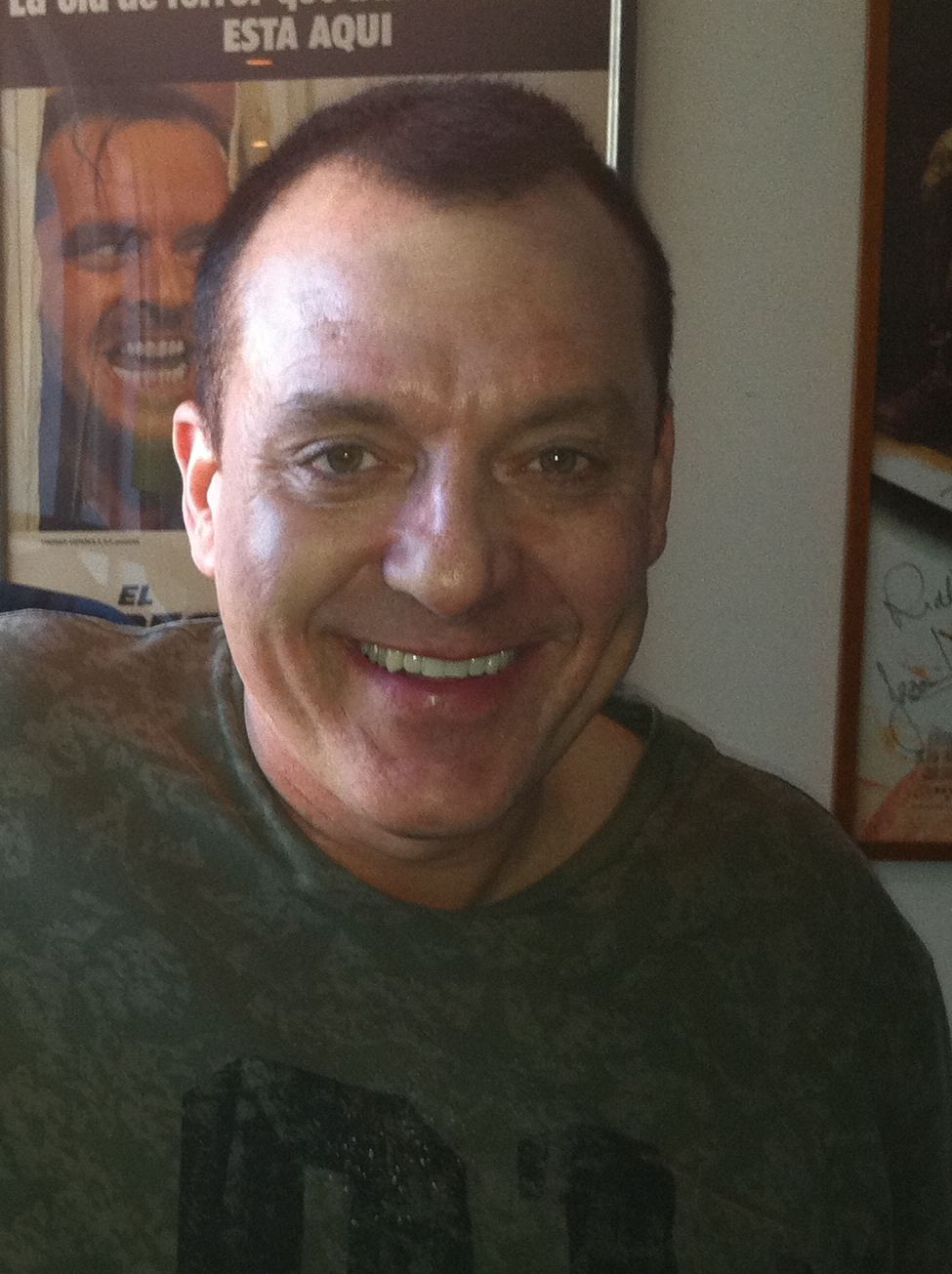
Tom Sizemore, actor and producer

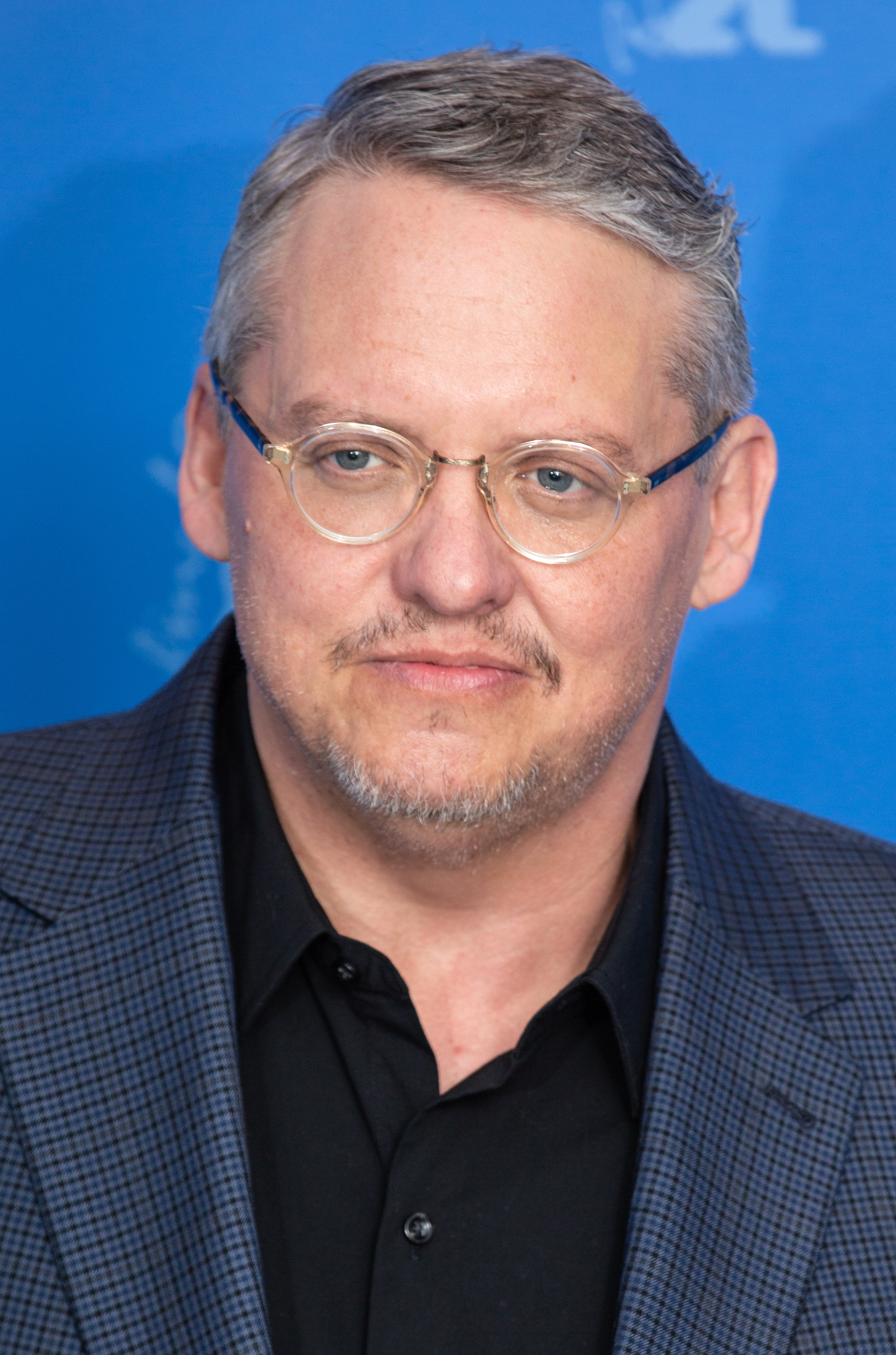
Adam McKay, producer

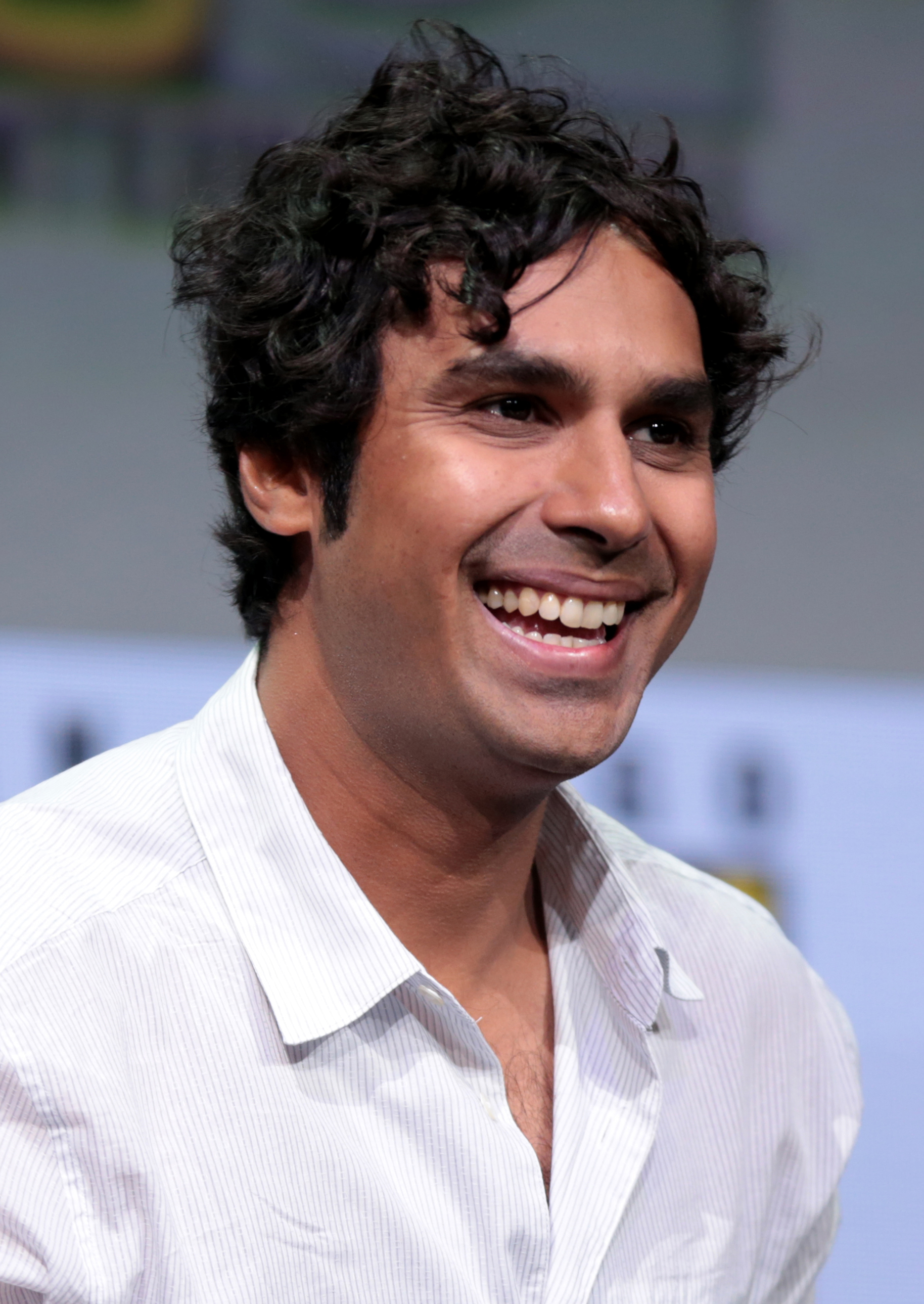
Kunal Nayyar, actor

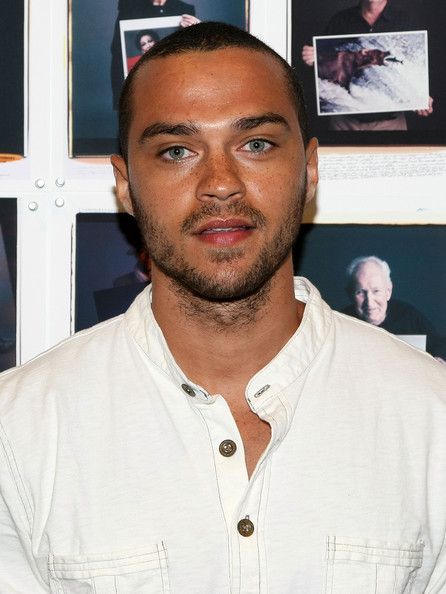
Jesse Williams, actor

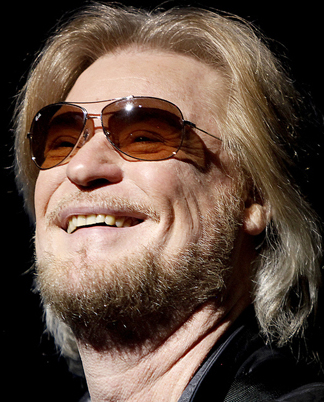
Daryl Hall, singer

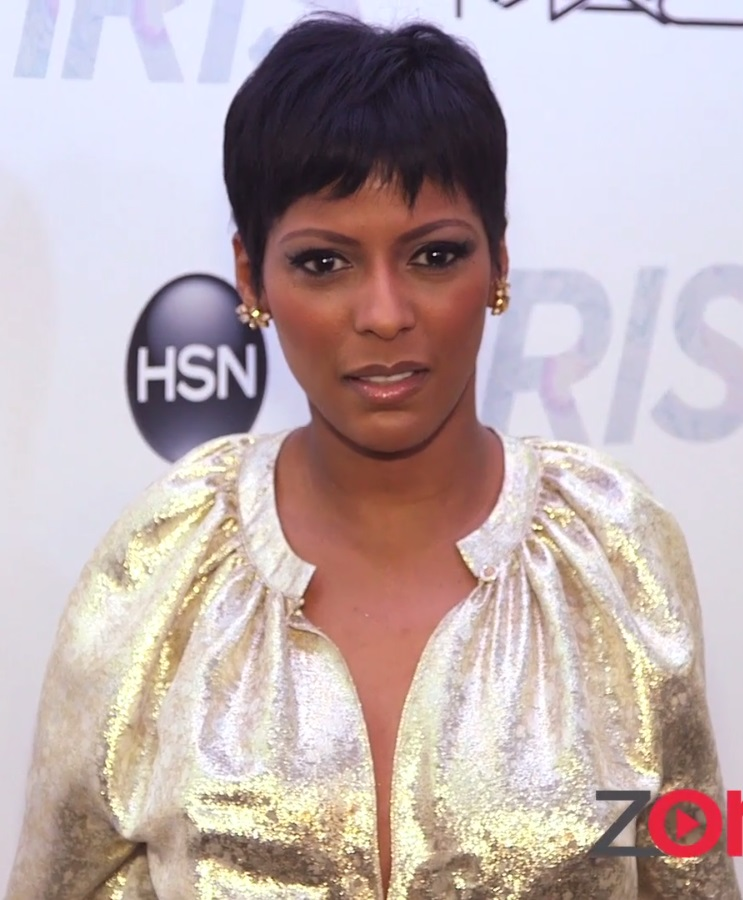
Tamron Hall, journalist and talk show host

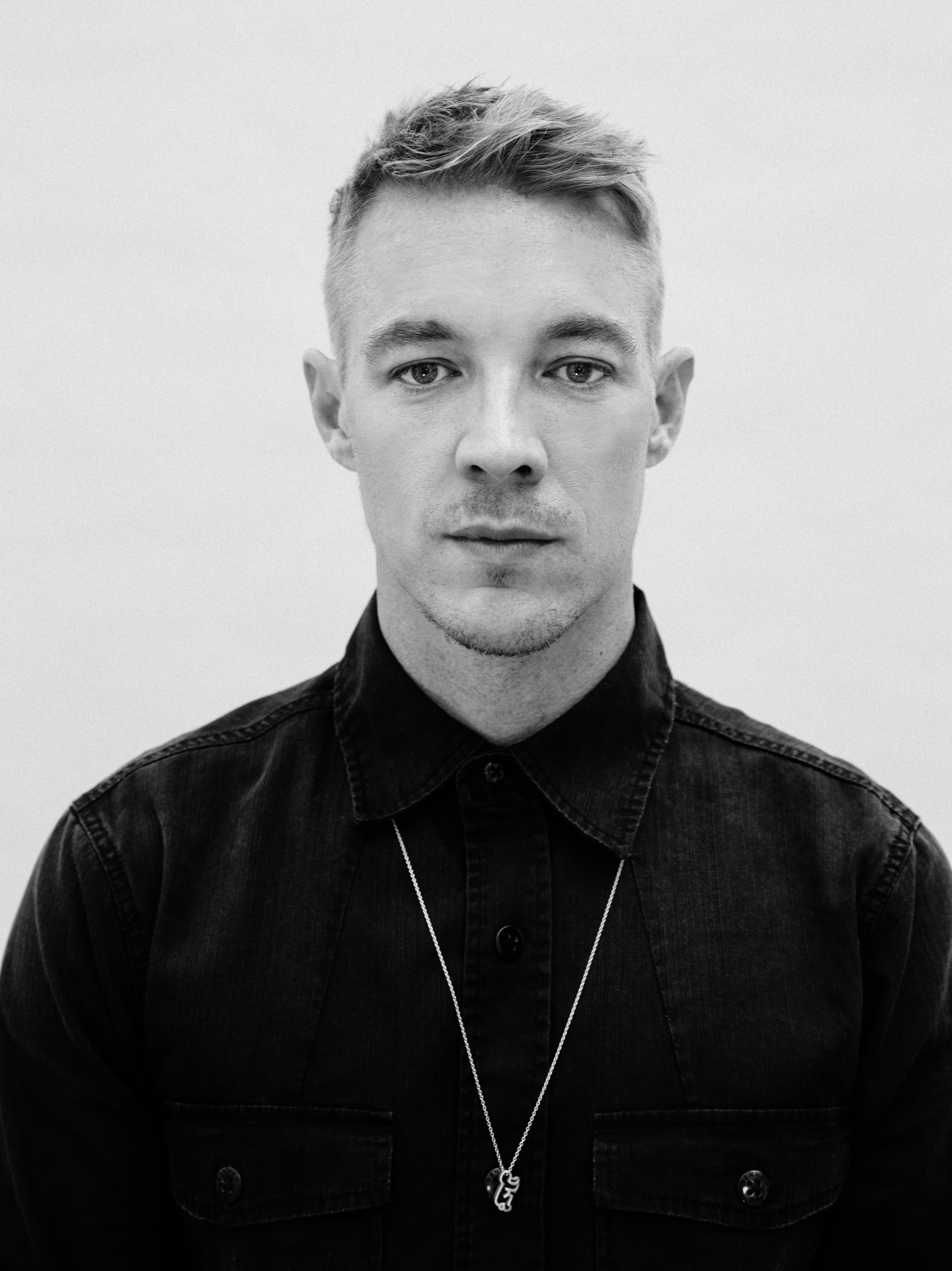
Diplo, DJ and songwriter

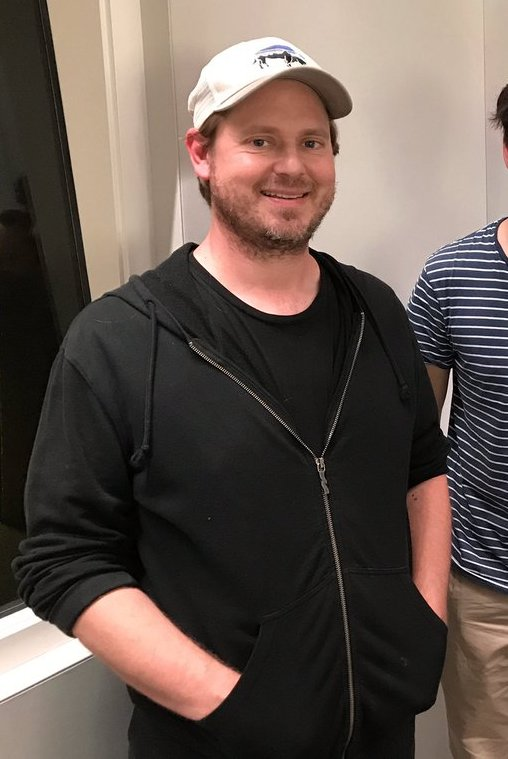
Tim Heidecker, comedian and director

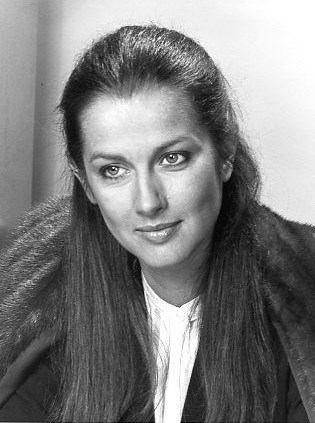
Veronica Hamel, actress and model

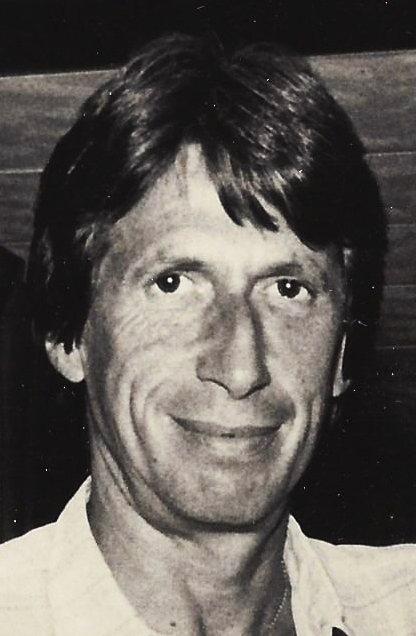
David Brenner, comedian

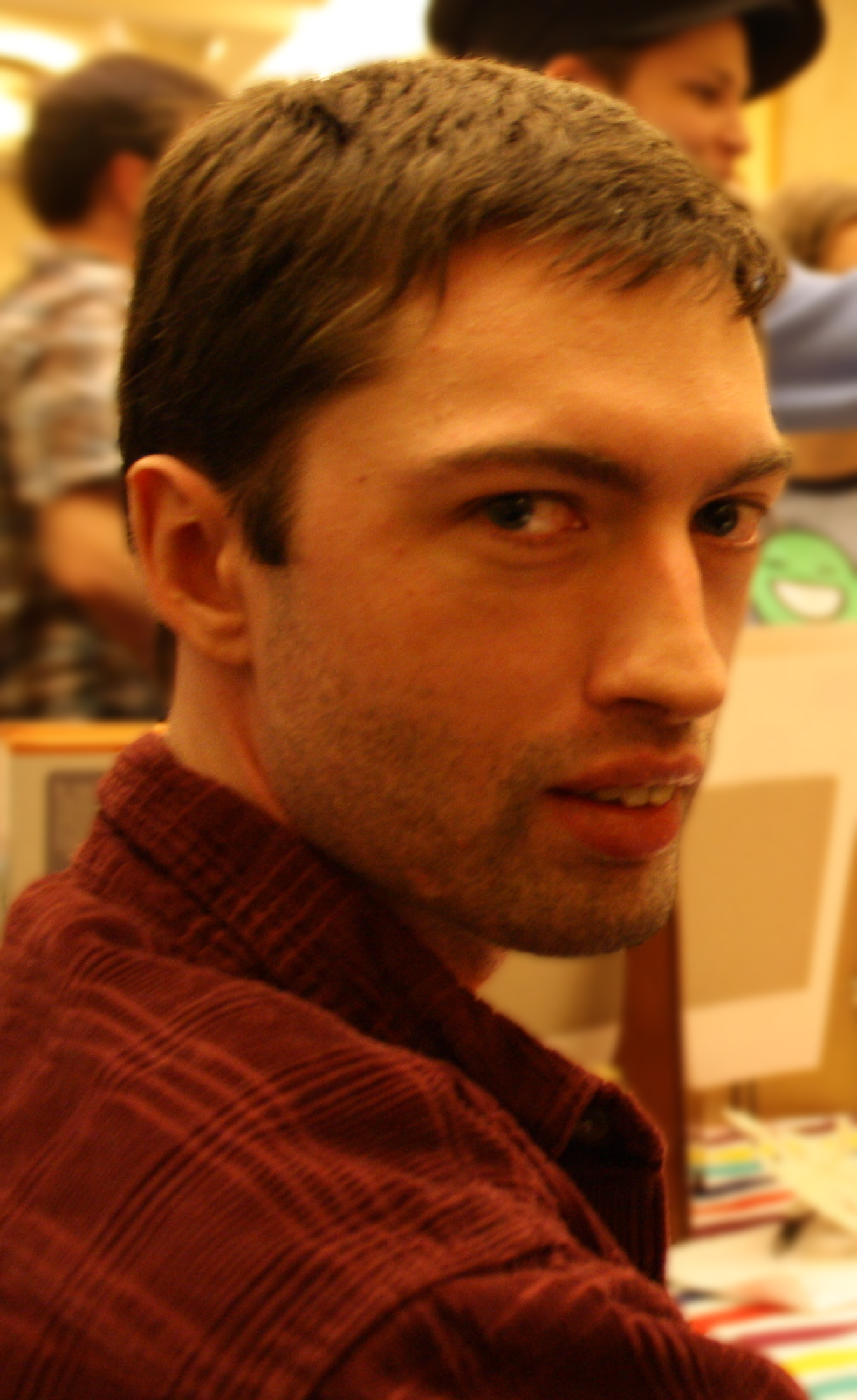
Andrew Hussie, author

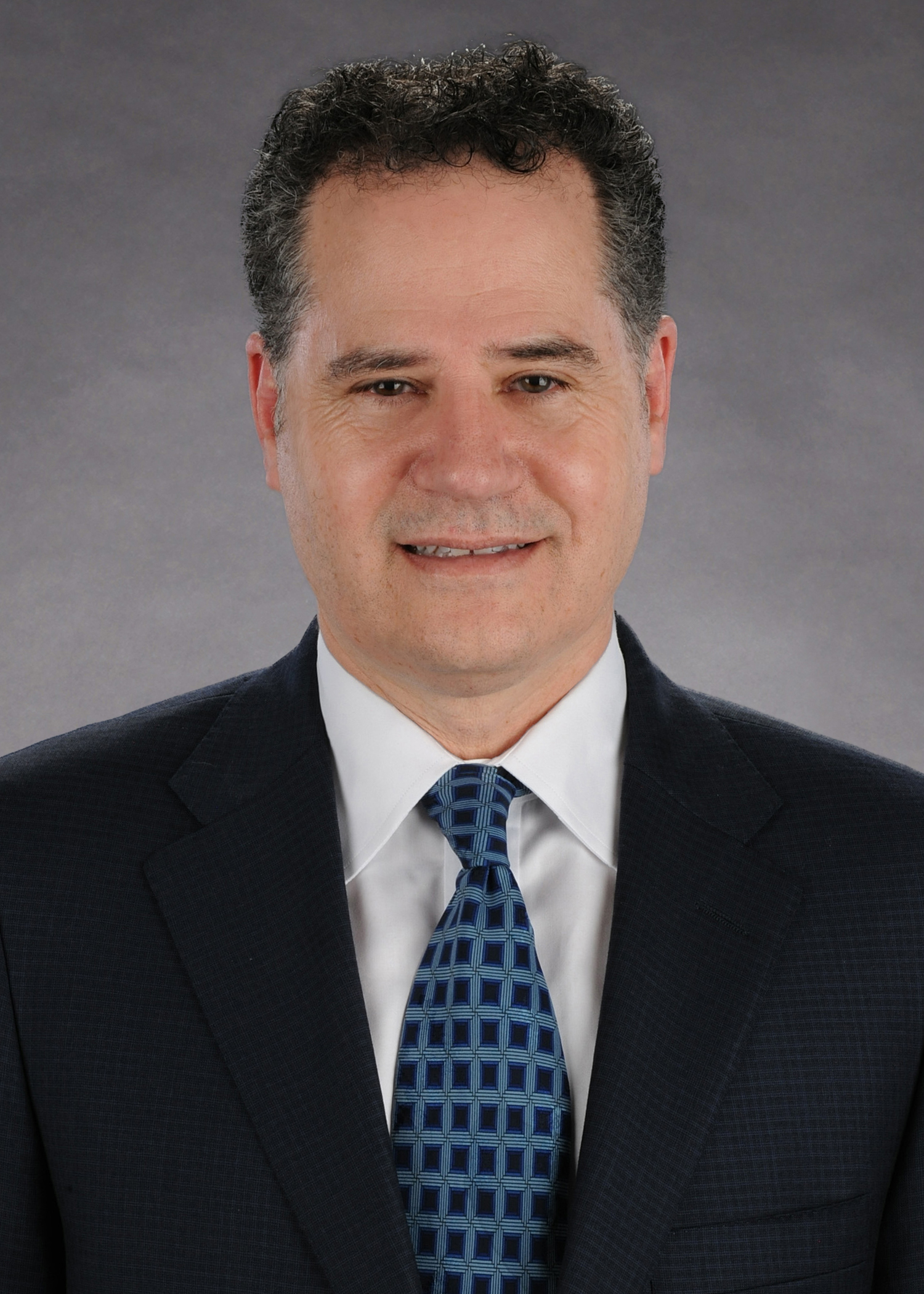
Richard L. Fox, attorney

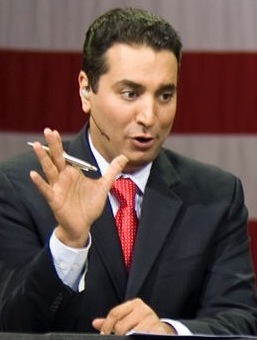
Kevin Negandhi, anchor for ESPN's SportsCenter

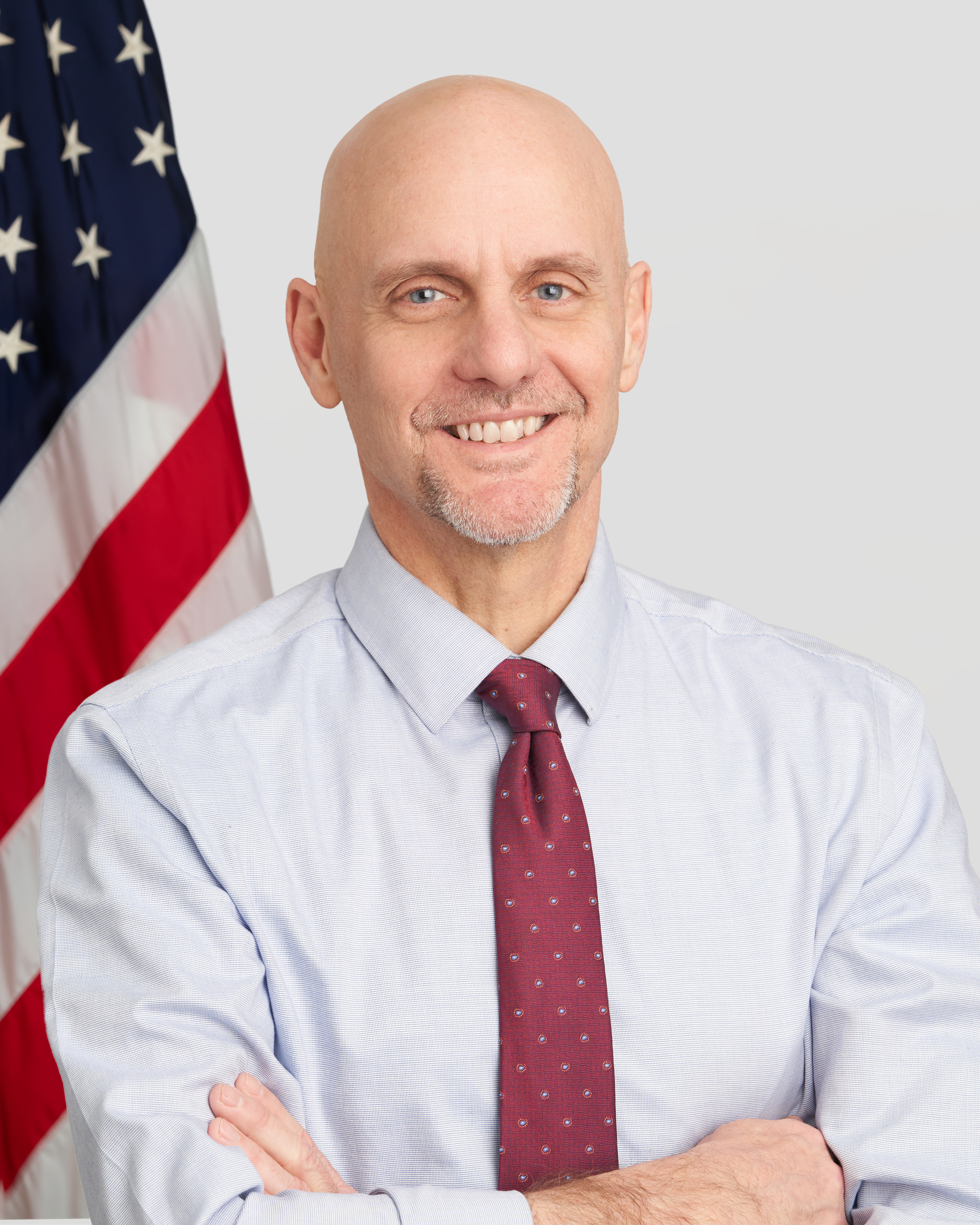
Stephen Hahn, former commissioner of Food and Drugs

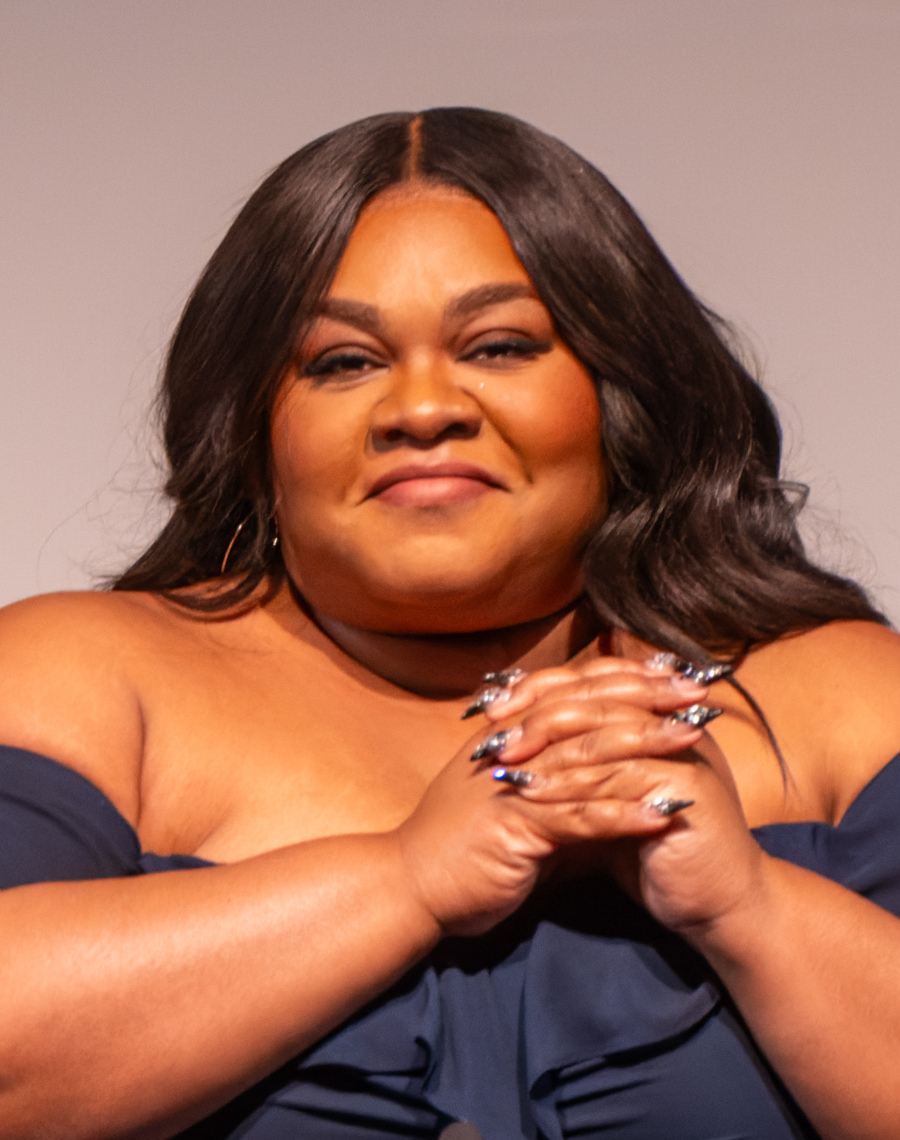
Da'Vine Joy Randolph, actress

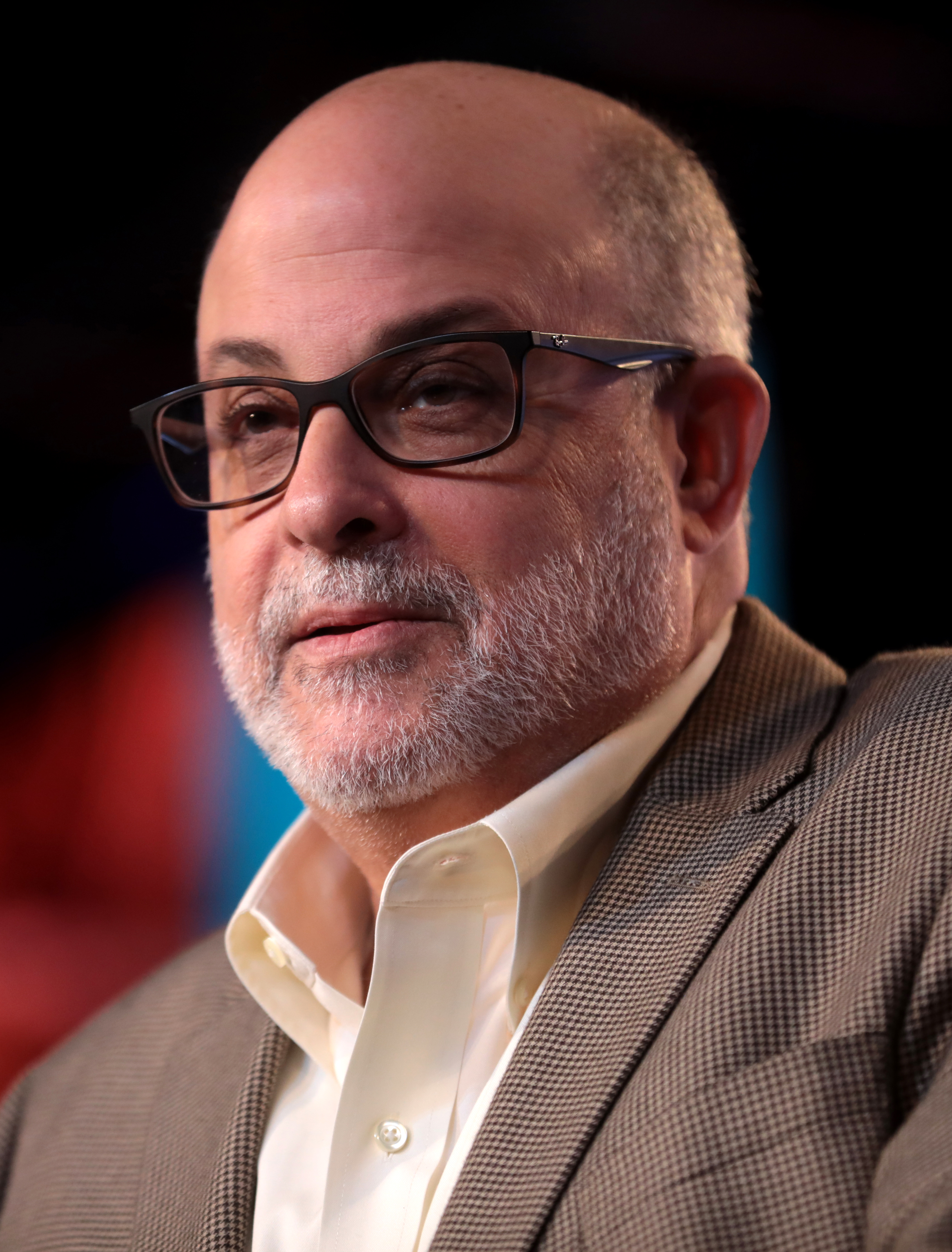
Mark Levin, radio show host

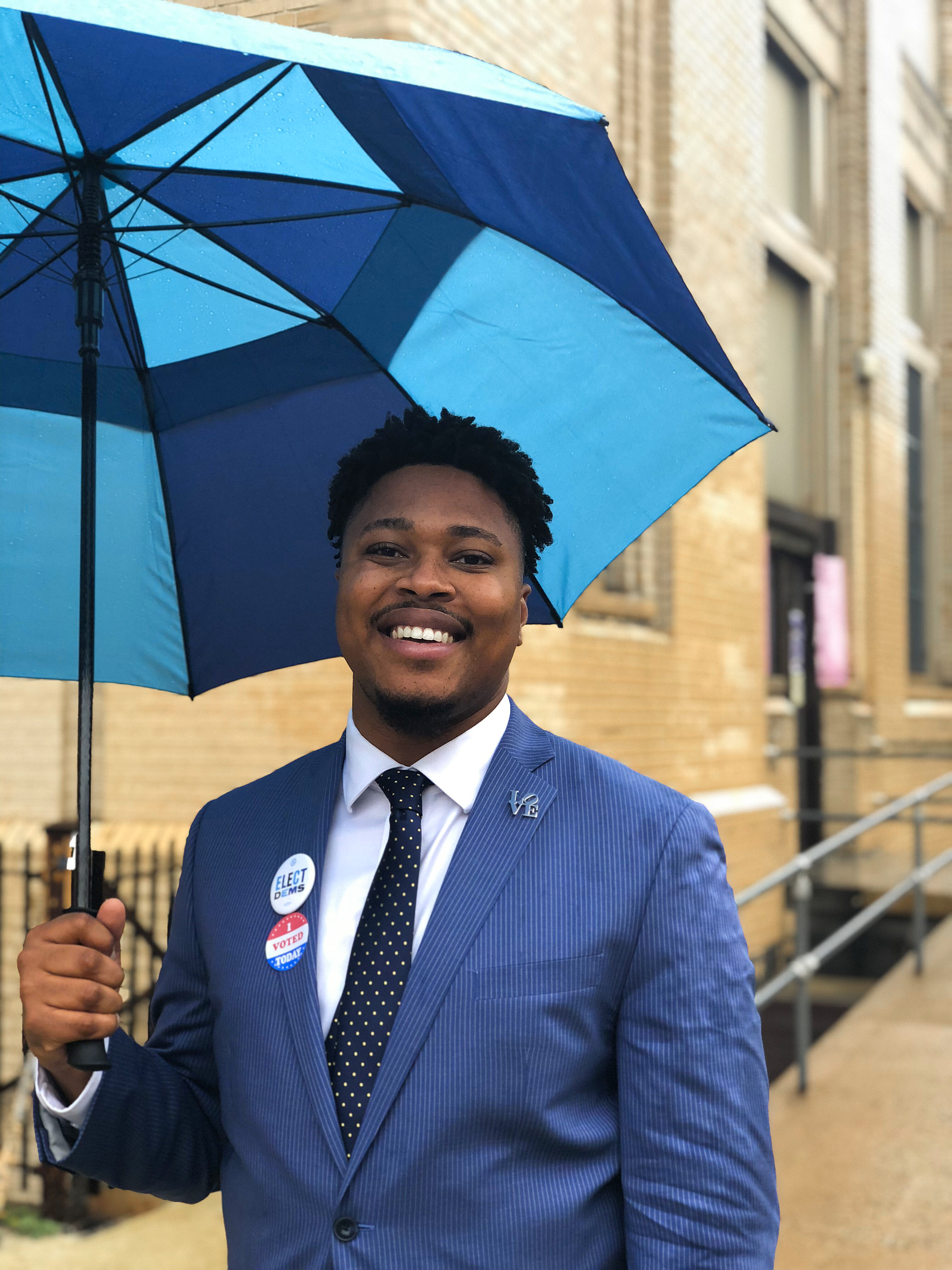
Malcolm Kenyatta, Pennsylvania state representative

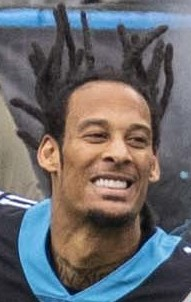
Robby Anderson, NFL player

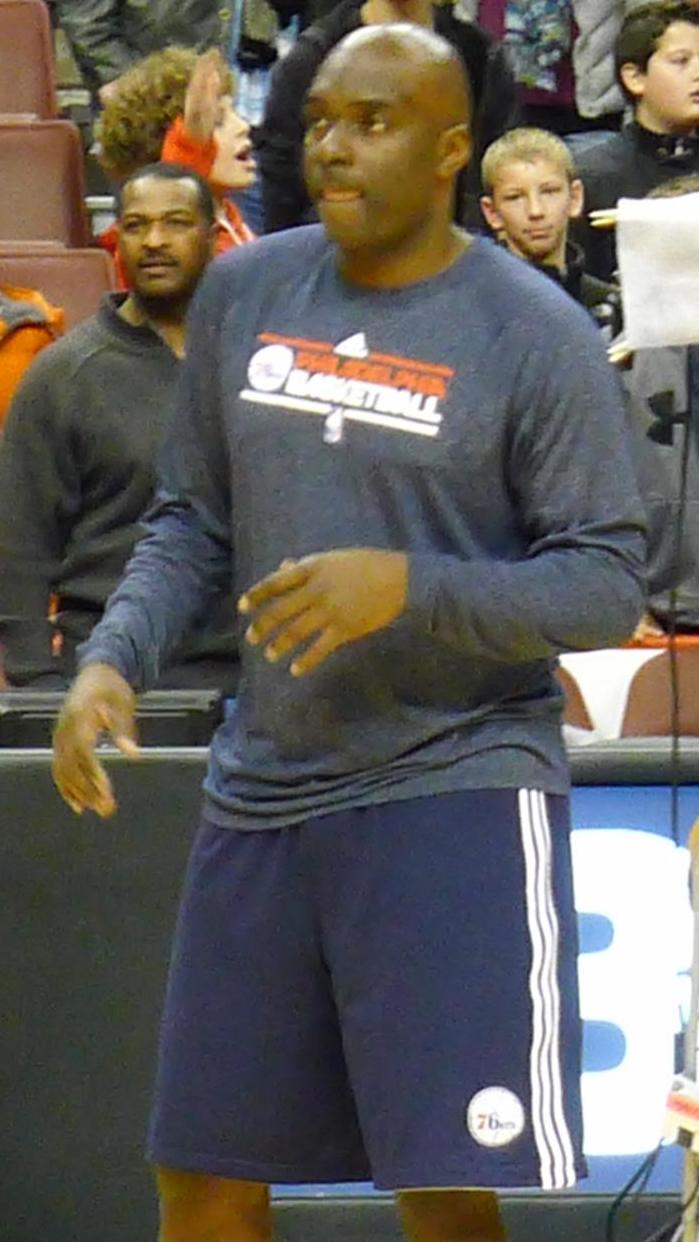
Aaron McKie, former NBA player

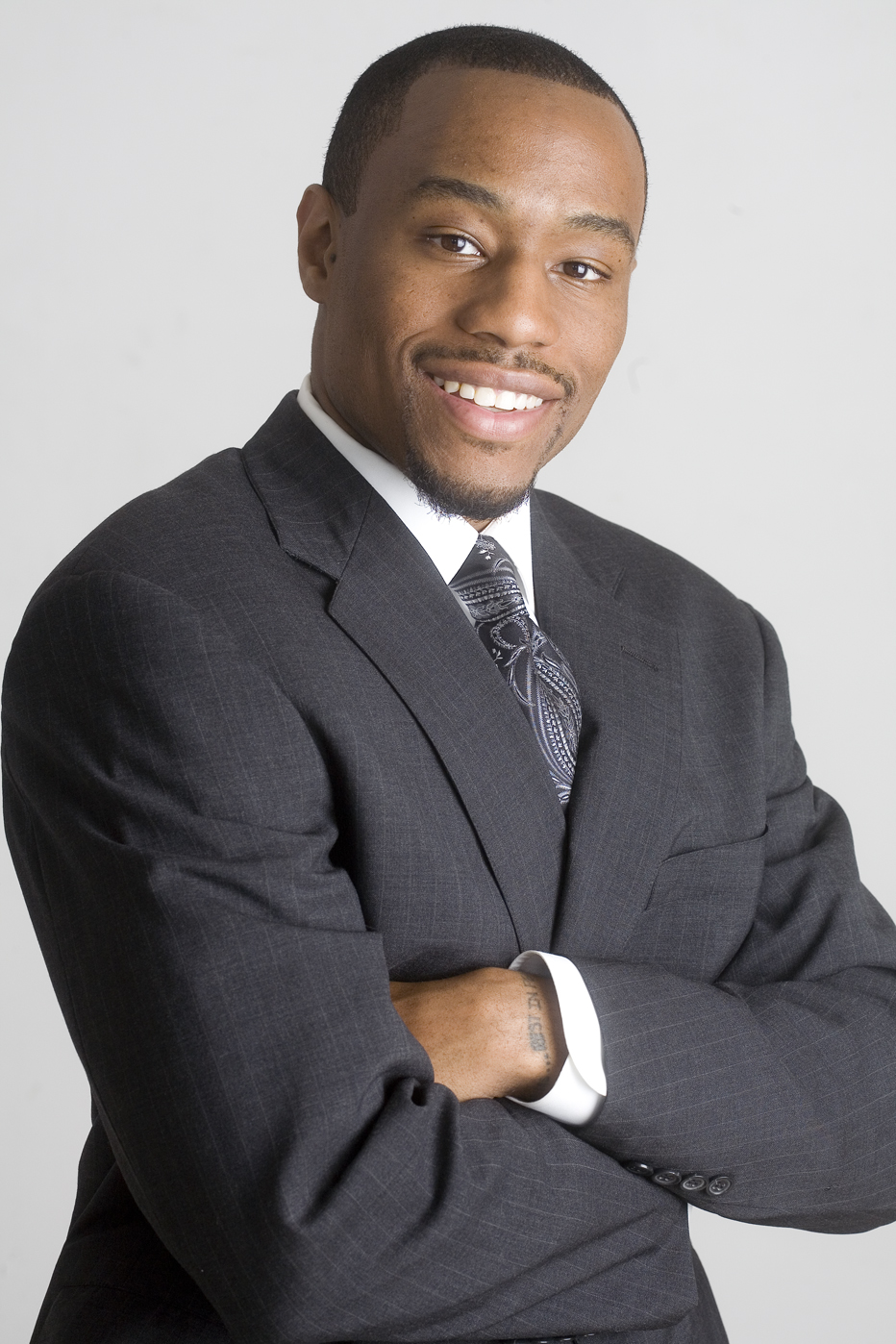
Marc Lamont Hill, political commentator

Quinta Brunson, actress

== See also ==
- Japan Campus of Foreign Universities
- List of colleges and universities in Philadelphia
- Universiti Tunku Abdul Rahman, a partner in Malaysia
