= List of Temple University people =

This is a list of notable faculty and alumni of Temple University, a comprehensive public research university in Philadelphia, Pennsylvania, USA.

== Presidents ==
The followings have served as president of Temple University:

No.	Image	President	Term start	Term end	Refs.
1		Russell Conwell	October 14, 1887	December 6, 1925 (Note: Died in office)	
2		Charles Ezra Beury	January 22, 1926	August 30, 1941	
3		Robert Livingston Johnson	September 17, 1941	June 30, 1959	
4		Millard E. Gladfelter	July 1, 1959	July 31, 1967	
5		Paul R. Anderson	August 1, 1967	June 30, 1973	
6		Marvin Wachman	July 1, 1973	June 30, 1982	
7		Peter J. Liacouras	July 1, 1982	August 1, 2000	
8		David Adamany	August 2, 2000	June 30, 2006	
9		Ann Weaver Hart	July 1, 2006	June 30, 2012 (Note: Resigned to head the University of Arizona)	
acting		Richard Englert	July 1, 2012	December 31, 2012	
10		Neil D. Theobald	January 1, 2013	July 21, 2016 (Note: Replaced immediately during board of trustees meeting)	
acting		Richard Englert	July 21, 2016	October 11, 2016	
11		Richard Englert	October 11, 2016	June 30, 2021	
12		Jason Wingard	July 1, 2021	March 31, 2023	
13 acting		JoAnne A. Epps	April 11, 2023	September 19, 2023	
14 interim		Richard M. Englert	September 26, 2023	October 31, 2024	
15		John A. Fry	November 1, 2024	present	

Table notes:

== Faculty ==
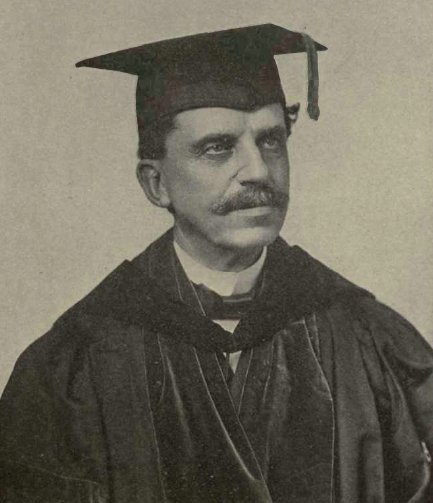
Russell Conwell

=== Biology ===
- Stephen Blair Hedges
- Jody Hey
- Masatoshi Nei

=== Business ===
- Subodha Kumar

=== Communication ===
- Joseph P. Folger

=== English ===
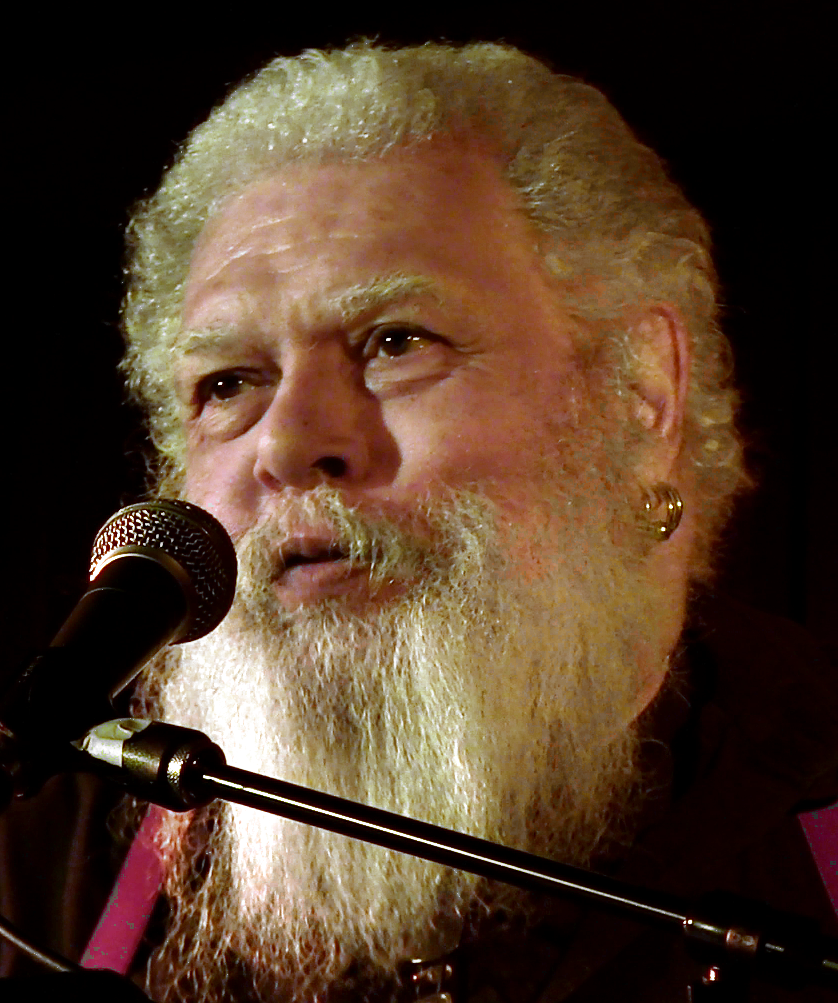
Samuel R. Delany

- Sebastian Castillo
- Samuel R. Delany – science fiction author
- George W. Johnson – former chair of the Temple Department of English; later president of George Mason University (1979–1996)
- Thomas Kinsella – Irish poet, translator, editor, and publisher; author of numerous volumes of poetry and a translation of the ancient Irish epic The Tain (Táin Bó Cúailnge); while at Temple, he developed a program for students to study in Ireland called "the Irish Experience"
- Liz Moore – author of the New York Times bestseller The God of the Woods
- Miles Orvell – cultural historian, editor of the Encyclopedia of American Studies
- Sonia Sanchez – poet

=== Film ===
- Stephen Cognetti
- Lauren Wolkstein

=== History ===
- Richard H. Immerman
- Alan McPherson
- David Alan Rosenberg
- Gregory J. W. Urwin
- Russell Weigley
- Ralph F. Young

=== Law ===
- Jim Drucker – former commissioner of the Continental Basketball Association, former commissioner of the Arena Football League, and founder of NewKadia Comics
- C. Darnell Jones II
- David Kairys
- David G. Post

=== Mathematics ===
John Allen Paulos

- Emil Grosswald
- John Allen Paulos – author of Innumeracy: Mathematical Illiteracy and its Consequences

=== Music ===
- Jeanne Behrend – pianist, musicologist, educator, and composer
- Katherine Ciesinski
- Joseph Conyers – bassist
- Rollo Dilworth – choral composer, conductor
- John Douglas – conductor and voice teacher; head of Temple's Opera Theatre program for two decades
- Cynthia Folio – composer, flutist, and music theorist
- Matthew Greenbaum – composer
- Aaron Levinson – Grammy Award-winning producer and musician
- Dick Oatts – saxophonist
- Terell Stafford – trumpet player

=== Philosophy ===
- Lewis Gordon
- Espen Hammer
- Joseph Margolis
- Jitendra Nath Mohanty, emeritus
- Miriam Solomon

=== Psychology ===
- Lauren Alloy
- Rinad Beidas
- Laurence Steinberg
- Joseph Wolpe – South African psychiatrist and founding figure in behavior therapy

=== Religion ===
- Ismail al-Faruqi
- Michael Alexander
- Edwin David Aponte
- Khalid Yahya Blankinship
- Sr. Christine Schenk
- Leonard Swidler

=== Sociology ===
- Annette Lareau

=== Sports ===
- Nikki Franke – fencer and fencing coach

=== Other disciplines ===
- Fauzia Ahmad – electrical engineer
- Muhammad Ahmad – historian and Black freedom activist, cofounder of the Revolutionary Action Movement
- Molefi Kete Asante – Africologist known for developing the theory of Afrocentricity and the nation's first PhD program in Black Studies
- Earl Bradley – pediatrician
- Emile B. De Sauzé – language educator known for developing the conversational method of learning a language
- Happy Fernandez – politician
- Mary Stuart Fisher – radiologist
- John E. Fryer – psychiatrist and gay rights activist, also known as Dr. Henry Anonymous
- Jacob Gershon-Cohen – professor of Research Radiology and developer of mammography for detecting breast cancer
- Chevalier Jackson – pioneer physician in laryngology and endoscopy
- Leah Modigliani – associate professor and program director of Visual Studies at Tyler School of Art and Architecture
- Mark L. Nelson – chemist and inventor of Nuzyra, an antibiotic FDA approved in 2018
- Waldo Nelson – "father of pediatrics," longtime editor of The Journal of Pediatrics; author of Nelson Book of Pediatrics
- Theresa A. Powell – vice president of academic affairs
- Lucia V. Streng – chemist
- Ann M. Valentine – chemist

== Alumni ==
=== Academia ===
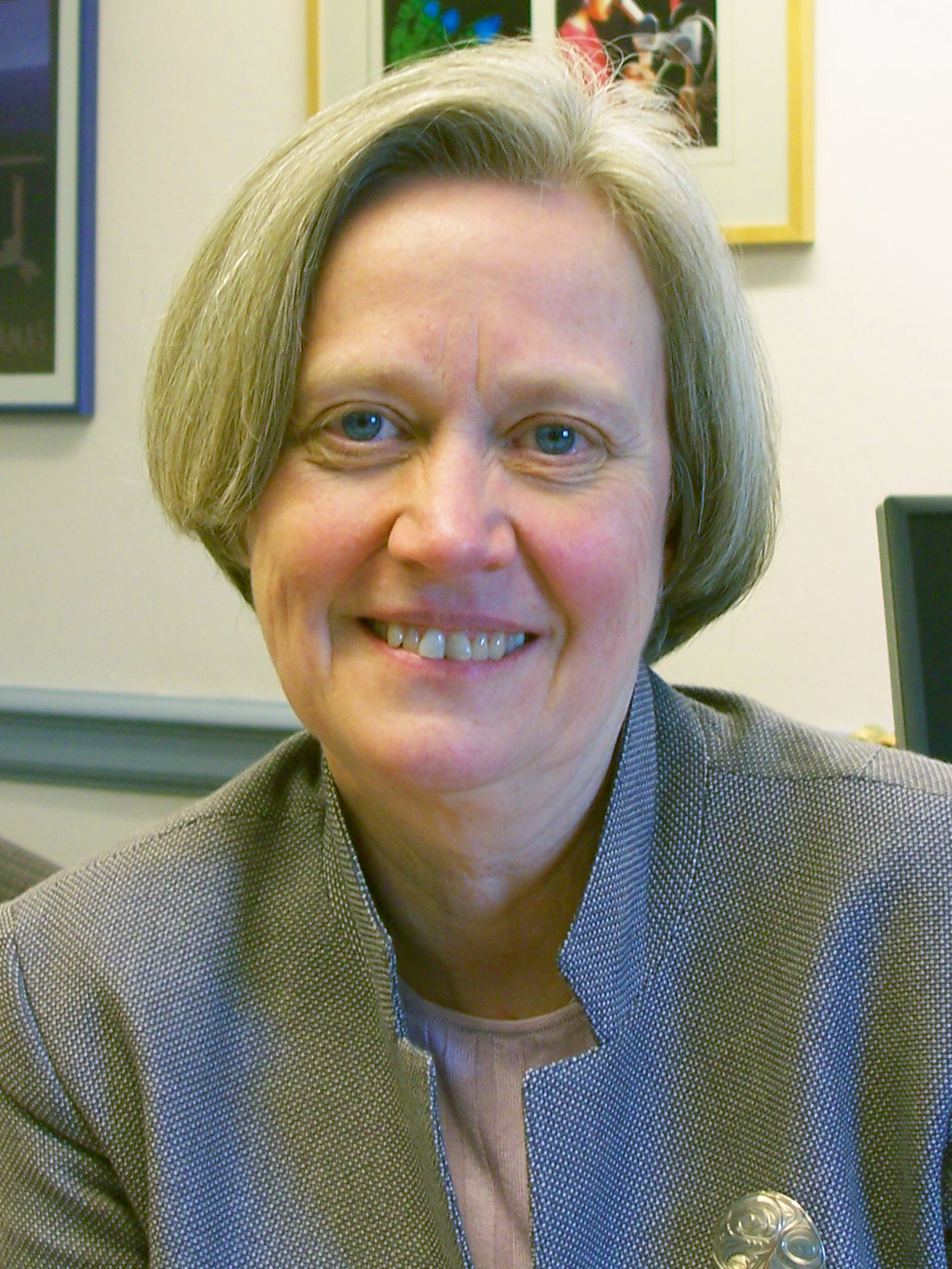
Shirley M. Tilghman, president of Princeton University (Ph.D., biochemistry)

- Rebecca Alpert – activist, rabbi, and current chair of the religion department
- Edwin David Aponte – author and educator, vice president for Academic Affairs, dean of the faculty, and professor of Christianity & Culture at Christian Theological Seminary, Indianapolis
- Leon Bass (Ph.D.) – educator
- John Baugh – linguist known for developing theory of linguistic profiling, Margaret Bush Wilson Professor in Arts and Sciences at Washington University in St. Louis
- Susan H. Brandt – historian
- David Bressoud (Ph.D.) – mathematician, former professor at Pennsylvania State University, DeWitt Wallace Professor of Mathematics at Macalester College
- Linda Darling-Hammond – Charles E. Ducommun Professor of Education at the Stanford University Graduate School of Education, where she launched the School Redesign Network
- Miguel A. De La Torre – associate professor of Social Ethics; director of the Justice and Peace Institute at the Iliff School of Theology; author of several books concerning the marginalized
- Angelo DiGeorge – physician and known for discovery of autoimmune disorder referred to as DiGeorge syndrome
- David Drasin – mathematician, specializing in function theory
- John Esposito – scholar of Middle East and Islamic studies, professor of International Affairs at Georgetown University
- Louis Filler – eminent professor of American Studies
- Gail F. Forrest – spinal cord researcher at Kessler Foundation and New Jersey Medical School
- Ben Goertzel – chief scientist of financial prediction firm Aidyia Holdings; chairman of AI software company Novamente LLC
- Stephen G. Haines – organizational theorist and management consultant
- Thomas Anthony Harris – psychiatrist and author of I'm OK – You're OK
- Martin M. Kaplan (1915–2004) – virologist and WHO public health official
- Katalin Karikó – 2023 Nobel Prize in Physiology or Medicine
- Nathan Katz – former professor at Williams College, current Florida International University professor and expert on Jewish communities in India
- Edmund Kornfeld – organic chemist
- Donald Kraybill – expert on the Amish
- Bill Mensch – computer scientist, founder, chairman and CEO of Western Design Center
- Robert K. Merton – sociologist, former professor at Columbia University and Harvard University, former chairman of the Department of Sociology at Tulane University
- Elizabeth D. Peña – professor and associate dean of Faculty Development & Diversity at the University of California, Irvine
- Martin A. Pomerantz – physicist, astronomer, director of Bartol Research Institute, NASA Exceptional Scientific Achievement Medal and National Science Foundation's Distinguished Public Servant Award recipient
- Glenda Price – former president of Marygrove College
- JoAnne Robbins – noted authority on dysphagia, professor at University of Wisconsin
- Charles Coleman Sellers – historian, biographer, and librarian, winner of the Bancroft Prize in 1970
- Stephen Sheehi – Sultan Qaboos bin Said Professor of Middle Eastern Studies, College of William and Mary; author of Foundations of Modern Arab Identity (2004), Islamophobia: The Ideological Campaign Against Muslim (2011), and Arab Imago: A Social History of Portrait Photography 1860–1910 (2016)
- Shirley M. Tilghman – former professor and president of Princeton University
- Patrick Henry Tolan – emeritus professor of psychiatry at the University of Illinois at Chicago (UIC), and the Charles S. Robb Professor Emeritus at the University of Virginia
- Alan Wolfe – political scientist and sociologist on the faculty of Boston College, as director of the Boisi Center for Religion and American Public Life

=== Art ===
- Laura Marie Greenwood – painter
- Trenton Doyle Hancock – artist
- Andrew Hussie – webcomic artist
- Simmie Knox – presidential portrait painter (Clinton)
- Nicholas Muellner – photographer and writer
- Ralph Rucci – designer
- Paula Scher – designer
- Sarai Sherman – artist
- Aaron Shikler – presidential portrait painter
- Jen Simmons – designer and web developer
- Tammy Stoner – artist and writer
- Ann Wilson – painter

=== Broadcasting ===
- Al Alberts – singer, Philadelphia personality on WPVI-TV
- Bob Brinker – financial talk radio host for Citadel Media
- Tony Bruno – sports radio talk show host on ESPN, Fox Sports Radio, and Sporting News Radio
- Howard Bryant – senior writer for ESPN.com and ESPN The Magazine
- Pat Callahan – host of This Week in Pro Football on 950 ESPN
- Steve Capus – president, NBC News
- John Clark – sports anchorman for NBC 10 news
- Fritz Coleman – weather anchor, KNBC-TV news
- Marsha Cooke – executive producer, ESPN Films, 30 for 30
- Tracy Davidson – news presenter for NBC 10 news
- Jerry Del Colliano – radio/TV broadcaster, digital media expert, USC professor, author
- Vince DeMentri – anchorman for NBC 10 news
- Ray Didinger – award-winning sports journalist, Pro Football Hall of Famer writer
- Nick Gillespie – author, journalist, editor at reason.com
- Tamron Hall – MSNBC anchor
- Marc Lamont Hill – academic, journalist, author, activist, and television personality, Our World with Black Enterprise and online HuffPost Live host, BET News correspondent, CNN political commentator
- John Kincade – sports radio talk show host on ESPN Radio
- Mark Levin – conservative author, lawyer, and radio talk show host on WABC
- Marty Moss-Coane – host, daily WHYY-FM local public radio show Radio Times
- Hiro Muramoto – Japanese cameraman for Reuters, killed while covering the 2010 Thai political protests
- Kevin Negandhi – ESPN anchor
- Ronn Owens – radio talk show host
- Ed Sciaky – disc jockey
- Gene Shay – disc jockey
- Eliot Shorr-Parks – Philadelphia Eagles reporter for WIP-FM
- Terry Smith – broadcaster, Los Angeles Angels of Anaheim
- Dyana Williams – radio and television personality, journalist, and celebrity media coach
- Marc Zumoff – sportscaster, Comcast Sportsnet, Philadelphia 76ers

=== Business ===
- John Carrig – former COO and president for ConocoPhillips
- Sam Greenblatt – vice president of Technology and Architecture in Enterprise Solution Group of Dell
- Jai Gulati – CEO of Systel
- Lewis Katz – businessman, philanthropist, newspaper publisher, former co-owner of The Philadelphia Inquirer
- Larry Miller – president of Jordan Brand, former president of Portland Trail Blazers
- Rosemary Reed Miller – owner of Toast and Strawberries, Washington D.C. fashion boutique
- Ash Vasudevan – founding managing partner of Edge Holdings

=== Film, theatre, and television ===
- Kalen Allen – actor and internet personality discovered by Ellen DeGeneres while at Temple
- Keith Andes – actor
- Darcy Antonellis – major film studio executive
- Joe Augustyn – screenwriter, producer
- Brooke Lewis Bellas – actor, producer
- David Brenner – standup comedian, actor, author, filmmaker
- Richard Brooks – Academy Award-winning Hollywood filmmaker
- Quinta Brunson – actor, comedian
- Cody Calafiore – model, actor, runner-up of Big Brother 16, winner of Big Brother 22
- Dennis Christopher – actor
- Bryan Terrell Clark – Broadway actor
- Bill Cosby – actor, comedian
- Nicholas P. Dallis – soap comic writer
- Colman Domingo – 2-time Academy Award-nominated actor
- Robin Atkin Downes - actor
- Norman Fell – comic actor best known for Three's Company (attended Theatre Dept. classes)
- Jason Winston George – actor, Sunset Beach, Platinum
- Johnny Ray Gill – actor, independent filmmaker (NBC's Harry's Law)
- William Goldenberg – Academy Award-winning Hollywood film editor
- Veronica Hamel – actress, known for playing Joyce Davenport on the television series Hill Street Blues
- Lois Hamilton – actress
- Tim Heidecker – comedian and co-creator of Tom Goes to the Mayor and Tim and Eric Awesome Show, Great Job!
- Debra Hill – film producer and screenwriter
- Tigre Hill – film director/producer
- Saba Homayoon – actress
- Irvin Kershner – film director, Star Wars: Episode V – The Empire Strikes Back (1980)
- Bruce Mailman – theatre producer and founder of The Saint
- William Marchant – playwright and screenwriter
- Adam McKay – Emmy-nominated director of Anchorman: The Legend of Ron Burgundy (2004), Talladega Nights: The Ballad of Ricky Bobby (2006), and Step Brothers (2008), Academy award-winning writer of The Big Short
- Kunal Nayyar – actor (Raj on CBS' The Big Bang Theory)
- Eric Owens – operatic bass-baritone
- Hugh Panaro – Broadway actor
- Nadia Parfan – Ukrainian film director and creative producer
- Robert Prosky – actor
- Da'Vine Joy Randolph – Academy Award-winning actress
- James Riordan – Broadway, television and film actor
- Herbert Rudley – actor
- Bob Saget – comedian, game show host, Full House
- Michael Schoeffling – actor (Jake Ryan in Sixteen Candles)
- Peter Shub – actor, clown, and circus producer
- Svetlana Shusterman – from MTV's The Real World Key West
- Tom Sizemore – actor
- Paul F. Tompkins – actor, comedian
- Dan Trachtenberg – film director of 10 Cloverfield Lane, and co-host The Totally Rad Show
- Eric Wareheim – comedian and co-creator of Tom Goes to the Mayor and Tim and Eric Awesome Show, Great Job!
- Patricia Wettig – Emmy Award and Golden Globe Award-winning actress, thirtysomething, Brothers & Sisters, Prison Break
- Christopher Wilkinson – Academy Award-nominated screenwriter, producer, and director
- Jesse Williams – actor (Jackson Avery on Grey's Anatomy)
- Danny Woodburn – actor (Mickey on Seinfeld)

=== Government ===
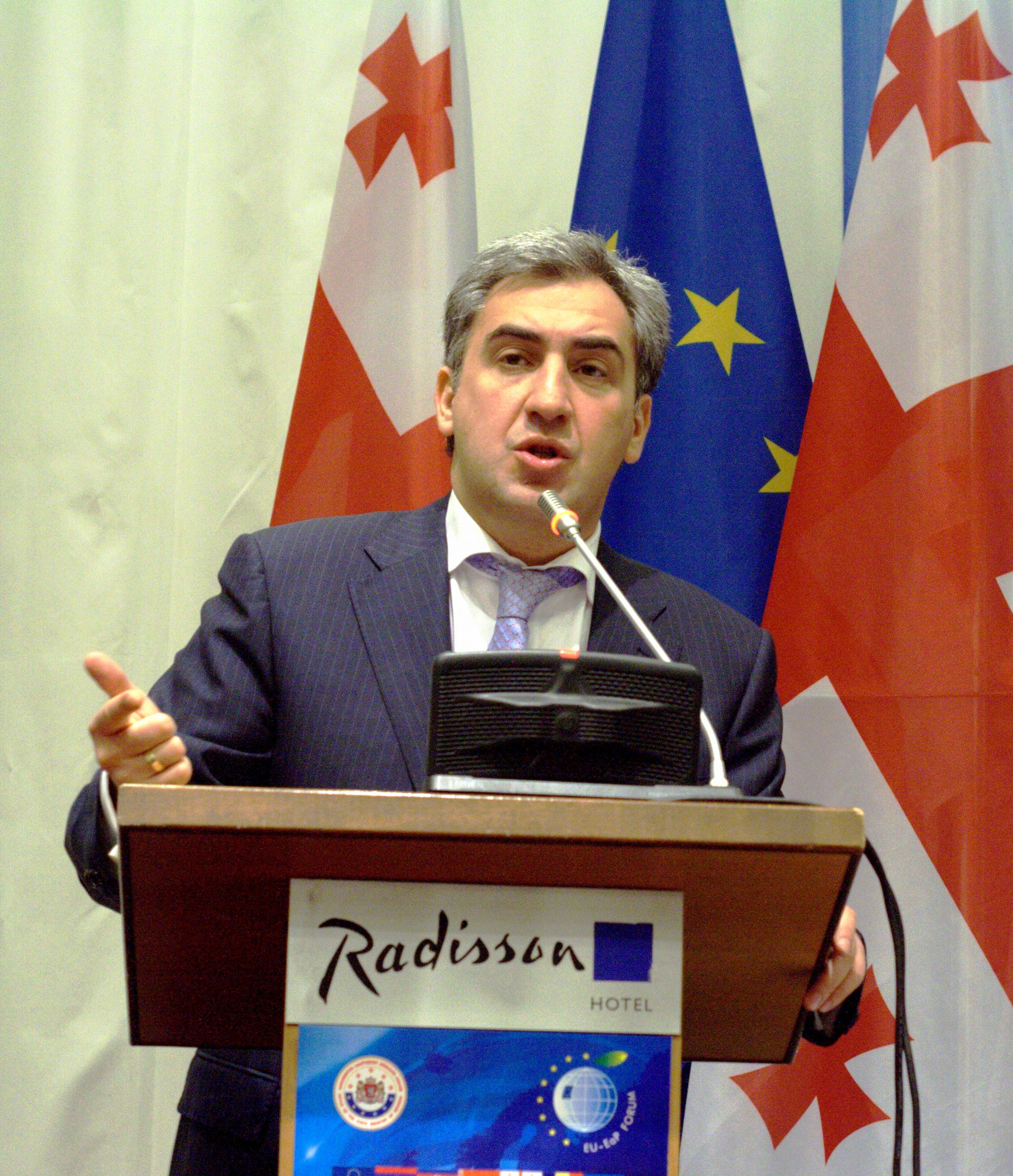
Nikoloz Gilauri, prime minister of Georgia (business)

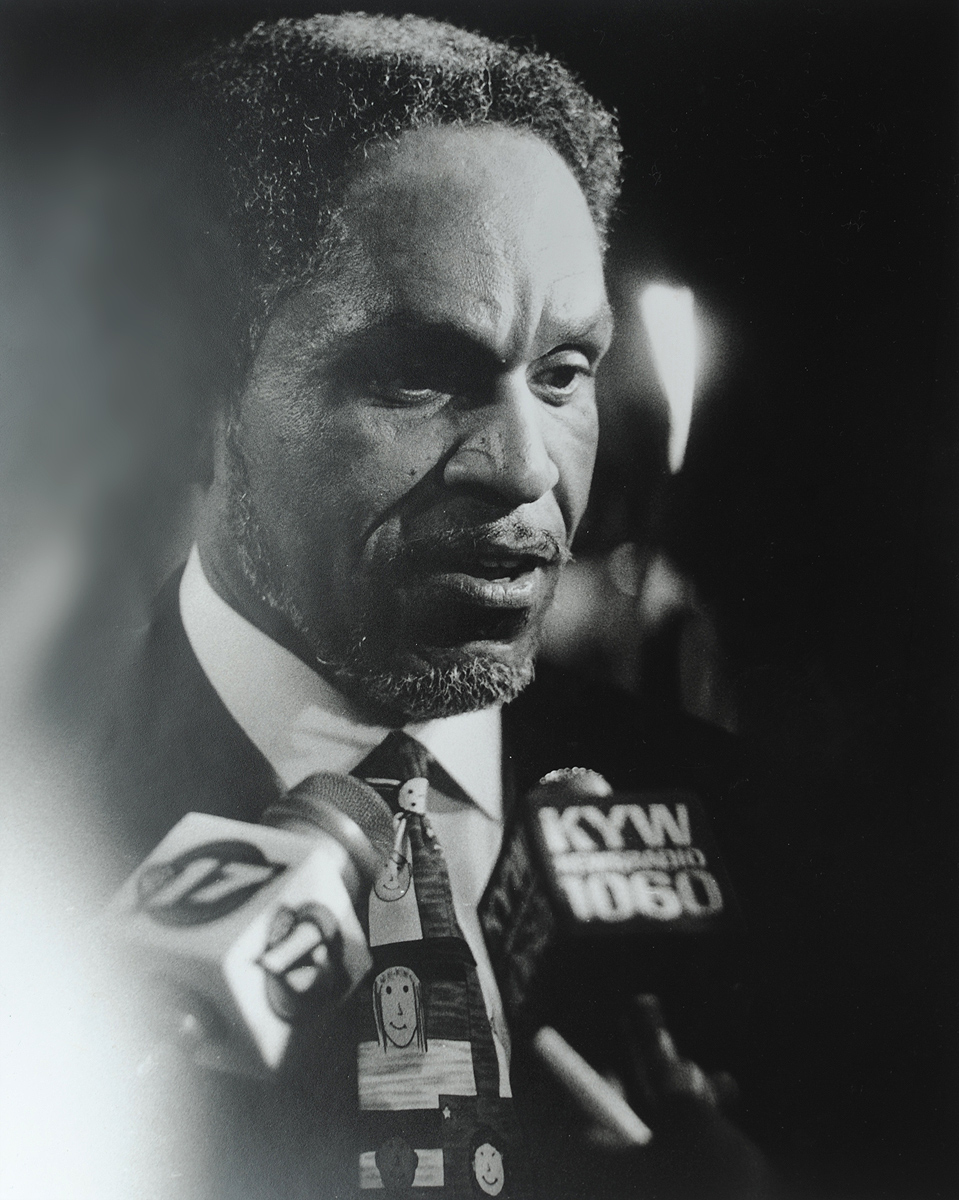
John F. Street, Mayor of Philadelphia (law)

- Mari Carmen Aponte – U.S. ambassador to Panama
- Edward J. Bonin – Republican U.S. congressman for Pennsylvania
- M. Julian Bradley – first African-American Republican elected to Wisconsin State Senate
- Frederick C. Branch – first African-American U.S. Marine Corps officer
- Horace J. Bryant – first African-American to serve in a state cabinet position in New Jersey
- Jamira Burley – municipal leader, national campaign deputy director
- Michael E. Busch – speaker of the Maryland House of Delegates
- Jim Cawley – lieutenant governor of Pennsylvania
- Mary Kay Costello – federal judge for the United States District Court for the Eastern District of Pennsylvania
- Robert Coughlin – longstanding Republican Pennsylvania representative to United States House of Representatives
- Mae E. De Vincentis – former United States Department of Defense official; vice director for the Defense Logistics Agency
- Ronald Donatucci – Philadelphia Register of Wills (1980–2020) and Pennsylvania state representative (1977–1980)
- Harold L. Ervin – judge on the Superior Court of Pennsylvania
- Edwin Duing Eshleman – former Republican congressman
- Thomas M. Foglietta – U.S. congressman and U.S. ambassador to Italy
- Vincent Fumo – Democratic Pennsylvania state senator
- Tom Gannon – Pennsylvania state representative for the 161st legislative district (1979–2006)
- Hage Geingob – president of the Republic of Namibia (2015–2024)
- Nikoloz Gilauri – prime minister of Georgia
- Joseph M. Gladeck, Jr. (B.S. 1972) – Pennsylvania state representative (1979–2000)
- Camillo Gonsalves (B.A. in journalism) – permanent representative of Saint Vincent and the Grenadines to the United Nations
- Theo-Ben Gurirab – president of the United Nations General Assembly (1999–2000); speaker of the National Assembly of Namibia (2005–2015)
- Stephen Hahn – commissioner of the Food and Drug Administration
- Allison Hepler – state representative
- Joe Hoeffel – former Democratic congressman
- Malcolm Hoenlein – executive vice chairman of the Conference of Presidents of Major American Jewish Organizations; founding executive director of the Greater New York Conference on Soviet Jewry and the Jewish Community Relations Council of New York
- Vincent Hughes – Pennsylvania state senator (Democrat)
- Zambry Abdul Kadir – current Menteri Besar of Perak, Malaysia, from political party UMNO
- Kathleen Kane – first female attorney general of Pennsylvania; convicted of felony perjury
- Paul E. Kanjorski – U.S. congressman, representing Pennsylvania's 11th district
- Kadida Kenner – founder and CEO of the New Pennsylvania Project
- Guy Kratzer – Pennsylvania state senator (1983–1986)
- Jerome Kurtz – commissioner of the Internal Revenue Service (1977–1980)
- David See-Chai Lam OC, CVO, OB (林思齊) – 25th lieutenant governor of British Columbia, Canada
- Joseph Lazarow – mayor of Atlantic City, New Jersey, 1976–1982
- Bryan Lentz – private attorney; former Pennsylvania state representative for the 161st legislative district (2007–2010); Democratic nominee for U.S. representative for Pennsylvania's 7th congressional district
- Joseph Melrose – former U.S. ambassador to Sierra Leone, currently a professor at Ursinus College
- Bernard T. Mittemeyer – lieutenant general and former Surgeon General of the United States Army
- Francis J. Myers – former U.S. senator and congressman, Pennsylvania
- Joseph M. Pratt – U.S. congressman from Philadelphia (1944–1945)
- R. K. Raghavan IPS – former director of the Central Bureau of Investigation, India
- Pallam Raju – former cabinet minister of India for Human Resources Development
- Charles W. Sandman, Jr. – represented New Jersey's 2nd congressional district, 1967–1975; unsuccessful candidate for governor of New Jersey in 1973
- Jim Saxton – U.S. congressman representing New Jersey's 3rd congressional district
- Jacob Seidenberg – chairman of the Federal Services Impasses Panel
- Younes Sekkouri – Moroccan minister of Economic Inclusion, Small Business, Employment and Skills
- Martin J. Silverstein – U.S. ambassador to Uruguay
- John F. Street – former mayor of Philadelphia
- Nao Takasugi – California State Assembly member
- Johnny Young – U.S. ambassador to Slovenia (2001–2004), U.S. ambassador to Bahrain (1997–2001), U.S. ambassador to Togo (1994–1997), U.S. ambassador to Sierra Leone (1989–1992)

=== Literature ===
- Sharmi Albrechtsen – author, blogger
- Ben Bova – science fiction author
- Frank Brookhouser – journalist, columnist, and author
- Tony Campolo – author, pastor, and speaker
- Anita Cornwell – author
- Eric Corey Freed – architect, author, public speaker
- Jeffrey Gitomer – author, speaker, business trainer
- David Goodis – crime fiction writer
- Helene Hanff – writer
- Tom McHale – novelist
- Ted Polhemus – writer, photographer, and anthropologist
- Jeffrey Robinson – author
- William Gardner Smith – author and journalist
- Jerry Spinelli – writer
- Lamont B. Steptoe – poet, photographer, and publisher
- Tony Trov – science fiction writer
- Johnny Zito – science fiction writer

=== Music ===
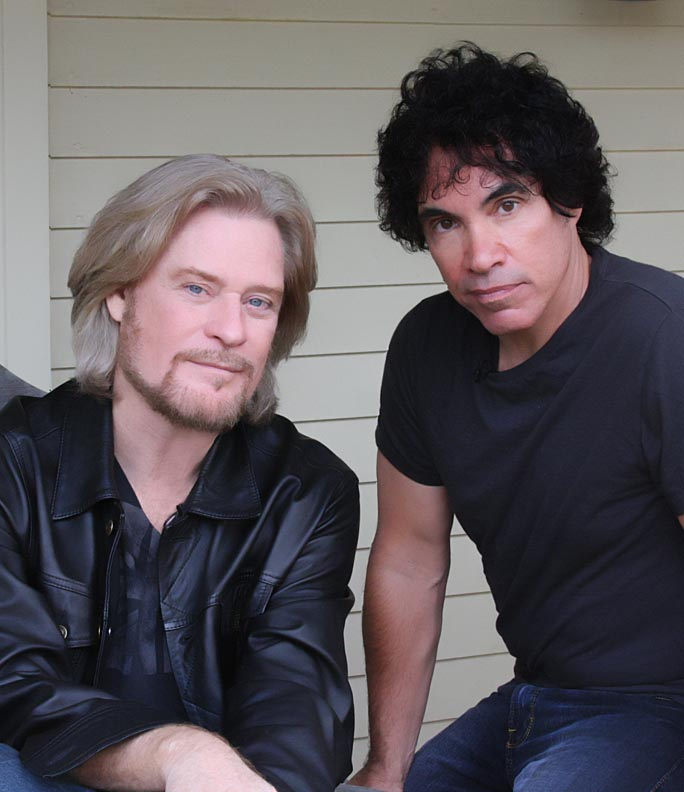
Daryl Hall and John Oates

- Irving Berlin (honorary degree 1954) – songwriter
- Rubén Colón Tarrats – orchestra director
- Abbie Conant – classical trombonist
- Norman Connors – musician, composer, arranger, and producer
- Evelyn Simpson Curenton – composer
- Diplo, born Thomas Wesley Pentz – DJ, producer, rapper, and songwriter
- Alix Dobkin – singer/songwriter
- Pat Finnerty – musician, guitarist, and songwriter
- Alex G – musician, guitarist, and songwriter
- Joe Genaro – musician, guitarist, and songwriter with the Dead Milkmen
- Ariana Ghez – classic oboist
- Julie Gold – songwriter, Grammy Award winner
- Daryl Hall – musician
- Marc-André Hamelin – pianist
- Jared Hasselhoff – bassist in band The Bloodhound Gang
- Mark Kramer – musician, producer-engineer, Mark Kramer Trio
- Fred Mascherino – musician, Taking Back Sunday, Breaking Pangaea
- Joe Masteroff – Tony Award-winning playwright
- Bill McGlaughlin – composer, conductor, radio host of Exploring Music and Saint Paul Sunday
- John Oates – musician
- Eric Owens – opera singer
- Billy Paul – Grammy Award winner and R&B singer, known for his number one single "Me and Mrs. Jones" and War of the Gods
- Fayette Pinkney – original member of The Three Degrees
- Jimmy Pop – lead singer of The Bloodhound Gang
- James Poyser – Grammy Award winning keyboardist, songwriter, and producer
- Jill Scott – R&B/soul artist
- Debbie Sledge – singer and member of the disco/R&B group Sister Sledge
- Joni Sledge – singer and member of the disco/R&B group Sister Sledge
- Kathy Sledge – singer and member of the disco/R&B group Sister Sledge
- Kim Sledge – singer and member of the disco/R&B group Sister Sledge
- Allan Slutsky – Grammy Award-winning producer and musician
- Jeffrey Solow – Grammy nominated classical cellist
- Terell Stafford – professional jazz trumpet player
- Tim – Korean ballad singer
- Susan Werner – singer-songwriter
- Wifiskeleton – musician and YouTuber

=== Other ===
- John C. Allen – roller coaster designer
- Howard Bryant – sports journalist and columnist
- Ted Bundy – serial killer
- Cheng Li-wun – chairwoman of Kuomintang
- Wesley E. Craig – US Army major general
- Reed Erickson – transgender activist, engineer, and philanthropist
- Richard L. Fox – tax attorney
- Judith E. Glaser – author and organizational anthropologist
- E. Urner Goodman – early leader of the Boy Scouts of America
- George E. Hargest – noted philatelic and member of the American Philatelic Society Hall of Fame
- Donniel Hartman – Israeli rabbi
- Linda and Terry Jamison – "The Psychic Twins"
- Steven Levy – writer for Wired and author of Hackers: Heroes of the Computer Revolution
- Shantrelle P. Lewis – curator, historian, critic and filmmaker
- Georgia L. McMurray – activist
- James Phyrillas – YouTuber and film reviewer
- Maralyn Lois Polak – journalist and author
- Jack Posobiec – alt-right political activist
- Stephen Starr – celebrity restaurateur
- Walter L. Stewart Jr. – US Army major general
- Gary Tabach – retired United States Navy captain, the first Soviet-born citizen to be commissioned an officer in the Armed Forces of the United States
- John Thomas Taylor – congressional lobbyist for the American Legion
- Salvatore Testa – hitman for the Philadelphia crime family
- Michael van der Veen – attorney, represented former President Donald Trump during his second impeachment trial
- Diana Vincent – jewelry designer
- James West – inventor, primarily of microphones
- Edith Windsor – plaintiff in United States v. Windsor

=== Philosophy ===
- Herman T. Tavani — scholar in ethics, and professor emeritus of Philosophy at Rivier University, recipient of the Weizenbaum Award

=== Sports ===
==== Baseball ====
- Bobby Higginson – Major League Baseball outfielder, Detroit Tigers
- John Marzano – MLB catcher, sports analyst
- Harry Shuman – MLB pitcher, Pittsburgh Pirates
- Ed Wade – MLB executive, Philadelphia Phillies

==== Football ====
- Robby Anderson – National Football League wide receiver, New York Jets
- Matt Balasavage – NFL tight end, Baltimore Ravens
- Stan Batinski – NFL offensive guard, Detroit Lions
- Todd Bowles – NFL head coach, New York Jets
- Raheem Brock – NFL defensive end, Indianapolis Colts
- Brian Broomell – Canadian Football League quarterback
- Tim Brown – CFL running back
- Lem Burnham – NFL defensive end, Philadelphia Eagles, did not play Temple, earned Ph.D. at Temple
- Henry Burris – CFL quarterback, Ottawa Redblacks
- Jim Callahan – former Continental Football League player and writer
- Larry Chester – NFL defensive tackle, Miami Dolphins
- Jim Cooper – NFL offensive tackle, Dallas Cowboys
- Mike Curcio – NFL linebacker, Philadelphia Eagles and Green Bay Packers
- Dion Dawkins – NFL offensive tackle, Buffalo Bills
- Derek Dennis – American football offensive lineman
- Randy Grossman – NFL tight end, Pittsburgh Steelers
- Tom Hanson – NFL halfback, Philadelphia Eagles
- James Harris – NFL defensive end, Oakland Raiders
- Mike Jarmoluk – NFL defensive tackle, Philadelphia Eagles
- Lance Johnstone – NFL defensive end, Minnesota Vikings
- Alex Joseph – NFL linebacker, San Francisco 49ers
- Bucko Kilroy – NFL defensive tackle, Philadelphia Eagles
- Dan Klecko – NFL fullback, Philadelphia Eagles
- Joe Klecko – NFL Hall of Fame defensive tackle, New York Jets; father of Dan Klecko
- Terrance Knighton – NFL defensive tackle, Denver Broncos
- Bill Manlove – NCAA Division III National Championship coach
- Tyler Matakevich – NFL linebacker, Pittsburgh Steelers, 2015 Bronko Nagurski Trophy and Chuck Bednarik Award Winner
- Jason McKie – NFL fullback, Chicago Bears
- Brandon McManus – NFL placekicker, Denver Broncos, Green Bay Packers
- Nick Mike-Mayer – NFL placekicker, Atlanta Falcons
- James Nixon – NFL cornerback, Green Bay Packers
- James Parrish – former professional football player
- Bernard Pierce – NFL running back, Jacksonville Jaguars
- Haason Reddick – NFL linebacker, Arizona Cardinals, Carolina Panthers, Philadelphia Eagles
- Britt Reid – former assistant coach in the NFL
- Kevin Ross – NFL cornerback, Kansas City Chiefs
- Sarah Schkeeper – WFA Guard, New York Sharks
- Leslie Shepherd – NFL wide receiver, Washington Redskins
- Al Singleton – NFL linebacker, Dallas Cowboys
- David Smukler – NFL fullback, Philadelphia Eagles
- Rod Streater – NFL wide receiver, Oakland Raiders
- Rian Wallace – NFL linebacker, Pittsburgh Steelers
- Steve Watson – NFL wide receiver, Denver Broncos
- Muhammad Wilkerson – NFL defensive end, New York Jets
- Avery Williams – CFL linebacker, Montreal Alouettes
- Tavon Young – NFL cornerback, Baltimore Ravens

==== Fencing ====
- Kamali Thompson – Team USA fencer

==== Basketball ====
- Lavoy Allen – NBA player, Indiana Pacers
- Rick Brunson – NBA player, Philadelphia 76ers
- Duane Causwell – NBA player, Sacramento Kings, Miami Heat
- Mardy Collins – NBA player, New York Knicks
- Candice Dupree – WNBA player, Phoenix Mercury
- Feyonda Fitzgerald – WNBA player
- Mel Greenberg – Women's Basketball Hall of Fame inductee, reporter for Philadelphia Inquirer
- Kamesha Hairston – WNBA player, Connecticut Sun
- Donald Hodge – NBA player, Dallas Mavericks
- Marc Jackson – professional basketball player in Europe, former NBA player
- Steve Javie – NBA referee
- Eddie Jones – NBA player, Los Angeles Lakers, Miami Heat, Charlotte Hornets, Memphis Grizzlies, Dallas Mavericks, 3× NBA All-Star
- Mark Macon – NBA player, Denver Nuggets, Detroit Pistons
- Aaron McKie – NBA player, Los Angeles Lakers, Philadelphia 76ers, former Temple Owls men's basketball head coach
- Bill Mlkvy – NBA player, Philadelphia Warriors
- Shey Peddy – WNBA player, Washington Mystics, Phoenix Mercury
- Tim Perry – NBA player, Phoenix Suns, Philadelphia 76ers
- Pepe Sánchez – NBA player, Olympic gold medalist for Argentina
- Terence Stansbury – NBA player, Indiana Pacers, Seattle SuperSonics
- Mark Strickland – NBA player, Miami Heat, Denver Nuggets, Atlanta Hawks
- Khalif Wyatt – Israeli Basketball Premier League player, Hapoel Holon

==== Other sports ====
- Mackenson Altidor – soccer player
- Marcus McElhenney – Olympic bronze medalist, rowing
- Benny McLaughlin – National Soccer Hall of Fame
- Zach Pfeffer – soccer player
- Jason Read – Olympic gold medalist, rowing
- Allen Rosenberg – rower and rowing coach
- Gabe Sapolsky – professional wrestling booker, part founder of Ring of Honor and Full Impact Pro
- Eric Semborski – National Hockey League emergency goaltender, Chicago Blackhawks and Philadelphia Flyers
- Geoffrey Sisk – former PGA Tour golfer
- Gil Stein – commissioner of the National Hockey League, 1992–1993

=== Fictional alumni ===
- Toby Flenderson – character in the television series The Office; has a degree in social work from Temple University
- Stanley Sugerman – character played by Adam Sandler in the 2022 film Hustle
