= Jason Wingard =

American academic and executive (born 1971)

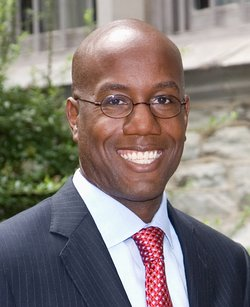

12th President of Temple University
- In office July 1, 2021 – March 31, 2023
- Preceded by: Richard M. Englert
- Succeeded by: JoAnne A. Epps

Personal details
- Born: December 13, 1971 (age 54) Pittsburgh, Pennsylvania, U.S.
- Occupation: Professor and Executive

Academic background
- Education: Stanford University (B.A.); Emory University (M.A.); Harvard University (Ed.M.); University of Pennsylvania (Ph.D.)

Academic work
- Discipline: Leadership development, human capital management, education

Jason Wingard (born December 13, 1971) is an American academic and executive. He served as the twelfth president of Temple University. Before that, he served in executive leadership roles at Columbia University, the Wharton School of the University of Pennsylvania, and Stanford University, as well as corporate workforce development at Goldman Sachs.

He is the author of four books on the future of work and talent development and a frequent contributor to mainstream media outlets writing about higher education, diversity, leadership and career readiness.

== Early life and education ==
Jason Wingard was born on December 13, 1971, in Pittsburgh, Pennsylvania and moved to West Chester, Pennsylvania at age four. His father was a public school principal and superintendent who attended Temple University for graduate school, and his mother worked in human resources.

Wingard is a graduate of Henderson High School in West Chester, Pennsylvania, where he was a three-varsity sport athlete in basketball, football, and track and field. He was the 1990 high school Pennsylvania state champion in the 300m intermediate hurdles and was later inducted into the Henderson High School Wall of Fame.

Wingard received an athletic scholarship from Stanford University for football and track and field. A football wide receiver, tight end, and outside linebacker, he was a member of the 1992 Pac-10 Co-Champion team (now referred to as the Pac-12 Conference). In track, he competed for Stanford in the 400m hurdles and was named Pac-10 Conference Academic All-American Honorable Mention in 1992.

Wingard holds a Bachelor of Arts in sociology with honors from Stanford University, a Master of Arts in education from Emory University, a Master of Education in technology in education from Harvard University, and a Doctor of Philosophy in education, culture, and society from the University of Pennsylvania.

== Career ==
=== Academic ===
He previously served as dean of Columbia University's School of Professional Studies, as well as vice dean of the Wharton School of the University of Pennsylvania, where he led the Aresty Institute of Executive Education. Before that, he was executive director of the Stanford Educational Leadership Institute (renamed the Stanford Educational Leadership Initiative) at Stanford University.

Wingard has taught leadership development courses at Columbia, Stanford and the Wharton School of the University of Pennsylvania.

Wingard has held executive education and leadership training with organizations including Columbia Athletics and LinKS@Wharton. In Columbia's fall semester of 2015, Wingard launched the Talks@Columbia thought leadership series. In 2016, he led a new "Global Human Capital Trends" course that was developed in partnership with Deloitte. Wingard introduced several access initiatives to offer Columbia's education to underserved populations, including the Columbia Girls in STEM Initiative and the Columbia HBCU Fellowship Initiative.

=== President of Temple ===
Wingard was appointed 12th president of Temple University in July 2021, and its first African American president since its founding in 1884. Wingard's tenure was marred by a number of controversies. In January 2023, the graduate student workers' union at Temple went on strike, following a year of stalled negotiations for a labor contract. The strike ended in mid-March. In the months prior to his resignation, there was also a rise in crime and violence on and near the university's campus, which was highlighted by the deadly shooting of a Temple University police officer.

After a tumultuous tenure of less than two years, he submitted his resignation to the university's board of trustees, effective March 31, 2023. Shortly before his resignation, the university's board of trustees had announced increased oversight of the university. The university's faculty had also planned a no confidence vote.

=== Corporate ===
Wingard served as the chief learning officer at Goldman Sachs where he was responsible for the strategy and implementation of learning solutions for the firm's global workforce. Since 2004, Wingard has served as president and CEO of The Education Board, Inc., a boutique management consulting firm and was senior vice president at ePals, Inc., a provider of school-safe collaborative learning products.

=== Board and leadership positions ===
Wingard is a co-founder and board director of The Education Board Foundation, which provides financial assistance to disadvantaged populations, and arts, education, advocacy, and public service organizations that support those populations.

He is co-founder and board chair of the Zoeza Institute, which provides mentoring support, advisory services, and transition programming for foster care youth in Atlanta, GA, New York, NY, and Philadelphia, PA. He is also co-founder of the Philadelphia Youth Sports Collaborative. He is a member of the board of directors of Kroll, a risk consulting company. He also currently serves on the board of the Roundabout Theatre Company in New York as well as the board of JUST Capital, an independent nonprofit that tracks, analyzes, and engages with large corporations and their investors on how they perform on the public's priorities. He previously served on the board of directors of Tides, a philanthropic partner and nonprofit accelerator dedicated to building a world of shared prosperity and social justice.

He sits on the membership committee of CEO Connection, served as a director-at-large on the University Professional and Continuing Education Association's Board of Directors, and was an Affiliated Faculty member at the University of Pennsylvania's Wharton Sports Business Initiative.

Wingard was a senior fellow at the Aspen Institute. He also previously served on the boards for the National Center for Fathering, United Cerebral Palsy of Philadelphia, White Williams Scholars (now Philadelphia Futures), and served on the Peer Review Council of the Organization Development Journal.

=== Publications ===
Wingard has published multiple books on professional education and leadership, including The Great Skills Gap: Optimizing Talent for the Future of Work, Learning to Succeed: Rethinking Corporate Education in a World of Unrelenting Change, Learning for Life: How Continuous Education Will Keep Us Competitive in the Global Knowledge Economy, and Win the Leadership Game: How Companies Can Create Unbeatable Global Teams.

His book, Learning to Succeed, was named The Washington Post's Leadership Book of the Week in July 2015, listed on Soundview Executive Book Summaries' 30 Best Business Books of 2015, and was chosen as getAbstract's September's Top 3 Reads in 2015.

Wingard is a senior contributor for Forbes and has written for or been featured in articles by media outlets including NPR, Chicago Tribune, Huffington Post, Fortune, Inc., New York Daily News, Vanity Fair, and TheStreet.

== Personal life ==
Wingard and his wife have five children.
