= Paul R. Anderson =

American educator (1907–1993)

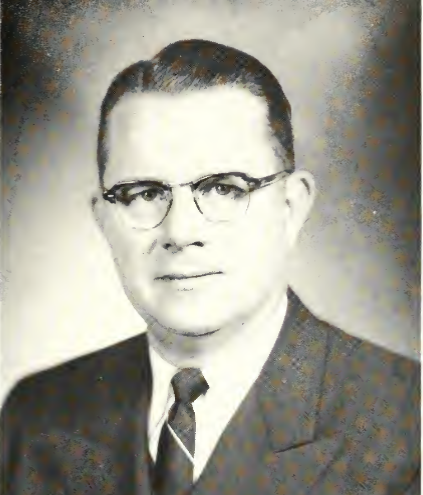
- Anderson in the 1957 Cornerstone yearbook

5th President of Temple University
- In office August 1, 1967 – July 1, 1973
- Preceded by: Millard E. Gladfelter
- Succeeded by: Marvin Wachman

10th President of Chatham College
- In office July 1945 – August 1, 1960
- Preceded by: Herbert Lincoln Spencer
- Succeeded by: Edward D. Eddy

Personal details
- Born: September 27, 1907 Akron, Ohio, U.S.
- Died: January 31, 1993 (aged 85) Ponte Vedra Beach, Florida, U.S.
- Spouse: Betty Ann Brown (m. 1934; died 1975) Ruth Kelley (m. 1985; died 1990) Mern Anthony (m. 1991)
- Education: Ohio Wesleyan University; Columbia University

Paul Russell Anderson (September 27, 1907 – January 31, 1993) was an American educator and academic administrator.

Born in Akron, Ohio, Anderson attended Ohio Wesleyan University and took his first teaching position at the American University of Beirut following his graduation. After returning to the U.S. and earning his Ph.D. at Columbia University, he taught at MacMurray College for Women, Lake Erie College, Oberlin College, and Lawrence College before accepting the presidency of the Pennsylvania College for Women in Pittsburgh. His fifteen-year tenure there included a significant expansion of the campus, a rise in the endowment, and a name change to Chatham College (now Chatham University). He left for an administrative role at Temple University in 1960 and was named president of Temple in 1967. His time at Temple was contentious; students staged a walkout protest during his inauguration and the faculty senate voted to demand his resignation in 1970. He ultimately retired effective July 1973 and died at his home in Ponte Vedra Beach, Florida, in 1993.

== Early life and education ==
Paul Russell Anderson was born in Akron, Ohio, on September 27, 1907, to Ora and Foster Anderson. He attended Ohio Wesleyan University, where he majored in speech, philosophy, and Greek, and graduated with a Bachelor of Arts degree in 1928. He was a member of the Sigma Alpha Epsilon fraternity and graduated with Phi Beta Kappa honors. Additionally, he was a member of the Delta Sigma Rho and Omicron Delta Kappa honor societies. During his senior year, he was an editor for the university newspaper. After graduating, he went to Beirut, in Syrian-occupied Lebanon, where he taught sociology and ethics at the American University of Beirut from 1928 to 1930. After returning to the United States, he studied at Union Theological Seminary and The New School for Social Research during the 1930–1931 and 1931–1932 academic years, respectively, and earned his Ph.D. from Columbia University in 1933.

== Career ==
Following his graduation from Columbia, Anderson took a teaching position at MacMurray College for Women, in Jacksonville, Illinois, though he spent only one academic year there before leaving for Lake Erie College, in Painesville, Ohio. He spent six years as a professor of philosophy at Lake Erie before accepting a position as visiting professor of philosophy at Oberlin College, in Oberlin, Ohio, where he stayed for one year. On April 25, 1940, he became associate professor of philosophy at Lawrence College (now Lawrence University) in Appleton, Wisconsin. In 1942, he became dean of Lawrence College. He took a leave of absence in Washington, D.C., during the 1944–1945 academic year to be a special assistant to the American Council on Education.

Anderson was announced as the new president of the Pennsylvania College for Women (PCW), in Pittsburgh, Pennsylvania, on May 30, 1945. He took office that July and his formal inauguration was held on October 24, 1945. Anderson's brother, Hurst Robins Anderson, president of Centenary Junior College, was a participant in the inauguration ceremony. A housing shortage was a major issue at PCW when Anderson arrived; as a result, the school converted the president's house into a dormitory and Anderson lived in another house off campus. Anderson's administration saw the school's campus grow by 50 percent and its endowment grew to $8 million (equivalent to $87.1 million in 2025), ranked fourth among all women's colleges nationwide. Among the larger changes to the school during his tenure was a name change to Chatham College, in honor of William Pitt, 1st Earl of Chatham, which took effect on November 15, 1955. During his time in Pittsburgh, Anderson was also a director of the Pittsburgh Symphony and WQED-TV. By the time of his departure from Chatham, Anderson had received honorary degrees from Ohio Wesleyan, the University of Pittsburgh, Elmira College, and Allegheny College.

Anderson was appointed vice president for academic affairs at Temple University on February 17, 1960; he began the position on August 1, 1960, the day his resignation from Chatham took effect. He was the first to fill that position at Temple, as it had been created by the university's board of trustees in January 1960. The position entailed direction over all academic administration of the university, excepting only the School of Medicine. Anderson also joined the faculty at Temple as a professor of philosophy. In September 1964, Temple implemented a new liberal arts-based curriculum required for all incoming students over their first two years; Anderson chaired the committee that designed the curriculum.

Anderson was elected president of Temple by a unanimous vote of the school's board of trustees on June 16, 1967. He had been nominated by the search committee on May 12 and was the only nominee for the position. He took office on August 1, 1967, and succeeded Millard E. Gladfelter, who became the school's chancellor. Anderson received criticism, particularly regarding his objections towards student activists, in an editorial published by the Temple University News on the day before his inauguration, which was held May 1, 1968. The piece specifically cited his lack of support for a student boycott of the school cafeteria – the boycott resulted in temporary suspensions for eight students – and his decision to not allow four seniors to receive awards for which they were nominated for by members of the faculty and administration. He also was criticized by faculty members for the administration's forceful response to a student sit-in protest in a university building; to disperse the 51 students, Anderson obtained an injunction and greatly increased police presence on campus. The same faculty resolution also noted that Anderson had made several decisions which went against the consensus of the Faculty Senate. At Anderson's inauguration, roughly 200 students were joined by several members of the faculty in a walkout protest, which took place as Anderson began his speech. In June 1968, Anderson was the commencement speaker at Wilkes College, where he was awarded an honorary Doctor of Science degree. Amidst what Anderson called "threats, intimidation, and forms of coercion" by students in early 1969, he responded that students responsible for such behavior should leave the school.

In November 1969, Anderson and the administration decided against raising tuition starting in the second semester of the 1969–1970 academic year. This decision was made in spite of the fact that the university had not received its appropriation from the Pennsylvania Legislature and had been forced to borrow $17 million (equivalent to $149 million in 2025) to make ends meet. Some months earlier, Anderson had clashed with students regarding a university construction project that displaced black students from their housing; the Student Senate proposed a one-day boycott of classes as a result.

The Temple faculty senate voted 107 to 49 on December 10, 1970, to demand Anderson's resignation as president, following the student newspaper, which had done so earlier that year. Only ten percent of the faculty senate took part in the vote, with the remainder of the faculty voting by mail. The full faculty vote results, which resolved against demanding Anderson's resignation 476 to 335, were announced in late January 1971. Anderson ultimately announced his resignation on March 14, 1972, to take effect at the end of the 1972–1973 academic year. During his time as Temple's president, numerous new buildings were constructed on campus, including McGonigle Hall, Paley Library, the Klein Law Building, Gladfelter Hall, and Anderson Hall, the latter of which was named for him. He was succeeded by Marvin Wachman, who took office on July 1, 1973.

== Personal life and death ==
Anderson married Betty Ann Brown on July 26, 1934, on the campus of MacMurray College. The pair were married until Betty Ann's death in 1975. He remarried to Ruth Kelley, a fellow 1928 graduate of Ohio Wesleyan, on February 16, 1985, in Funchal, Madeira. Kelley had worked as an interior decorator at Chatham and Temple during Anderson's presidencies at both schools; she had been a widow for approximately ten months. Kelley died April 17, 1990; Anderson remarried to Mern Anthony on June 15, 1991.

Anderson retired to Martha's Vineyard, Massachusetts, and later moved to Ponte Vedra Beach, Florida. He died at his home in Ponte Vedra Beach on January 31, 1993, from cancer.
