= Henry Kessler =

Henry Kessler may refer to:

- Henry Kessler (baseball) (1847–1900), Major League Baseball player
- Henry Kessler (soccer) (born 1998), American soccer player
- Henry H. Kessler (1896–1978), American surgeon
