= Kessler Foundation =

- Formation: 1985
- Founder: Dr. Henry H. Kessler
- Purpose: Improve function and quality of life for persons with spinal cord and traumatic brain injury, stroke, multiple sclerosis and other neurological and orthopedic conditions

Kessler Foundation, established in 1985, is a nonprofit in the field of rehabilitation research for people with disabilities. Kessler Foundation has its roots in the Kessler Institute, founded in 1949 to improve medical outcomes and employment of people disabled by brain or spinal injury. Kessler Foundation conducts rehabilitation research with the goal of increasing function for cognition, mobility, and long-term outcomes, including employment, for people with neurological disabilities caused by diseases and injuries of the brain and spinal cord.

== History ==
In 1949, Henry H. Kessler, MD, founded the Kessler Institute for Rehabilitation, a hospital seeking to improve the quality of life for people with physical disabilities.

Following World War II, the Kessler Institute served disabled veterans and used skills that Kessler developed as a captain in the United States Navy serving in the Pacific Ocean theater of World War II helping handicapped civilians.

In April 1956, Henry Kessler said it was important to match vocational education programs for people with physical limitations with their interests and abilities with previous work experience. This included determining whether people were best suited to technical, clerical, or industrial work, and whether they had the “emotional or mental” tolerance for stressful jobs.

In August 2003, Kessler Foundation sold Kessler Institute for Rehabilitation to Select Medical Corporation.

In 2007, Kessler Foundation merged with the Kessler Medical Rehabilitation and Research and Education Corporation.

In 2008, the organization co-sponsored the International Conference on Behavioral Health and Traumatic Brain Injury focusing on addressing injuries of Iraq War soldiers.

In 2022, Kessler Foundation's scientists’ work included researching the cognitive and physiological effects of neurological and musculoskeletal conditions, and new rehabilitation technologies (e.g. robotic exoskeletons) and virtual reality relevant to these conditions.

In 2022, Kessler Foundation added a Center for Autism Research to its organization.

== Research ==
Kessler Foundation includes almost 200 staff members who work in areas such as neuropsychology, neuroscience, outcomes assessment, traumatic brain injury, spinal cord injury, stroke, rehabilitation engineering, gait analysis and motor control. Other research projects in 2022 included: robotic exoskeletons to assist with mobility for people with disabilities, memory rehabilitation for people with multiple sclerosis, and a study on the impact of the COVID-19 pandemic on autistic children.

== Grants ==
Kessler Foundation distributes external grants to nonprofit programs that expand job opportunities for people with disabilities. In 2008 and 2009, Kessler Foundation granted about $500,000 to the Arthur & Friends project, which trains developmentally disabled workers in how to grow produce in hydroponic greenhouses.

In 2018, the grantmaking division of Kessler Foundation provided $2,186,673 in direct grants to various organizations. In 2019, it provided $2,689,734.

In 2021, Kessler Foundation provided approximately $2 million to promote the inclusion of people with disabilities in the workplace, including $1 million through its Community Employment grants program.

In 2021, Kessler Foundation funded a cafe in Woodbridge, NJ, that trains young adults with special needs in food service industry work.

In 2022, Kessler Foundation approved approximately $1 million in grants to support initiatives that promote the inclusion of people with disabilities in the workplace.

In 2022 and again in 2023, Kessler Foundation provided $250,000 Signature Employment Grants to the National Restaurant Association Educational Foundation (NRAEF) to strengthen its work-readiness training for people with disabilities through its Hospitality Pathways.

The Community Employment Grant program supports projects, programs, pilot initiatives, and creative solutions that work toward improving the employment and career advancement of New Jersey citizens with disabilities. Grants are for one year and range from $25,000 to $50,000 each.

== Books ==
Kessler, Dr. Henry H. Kessler (1968) The Knife is Not Enough. New York: W. W. Norton & Company.
