= Charles L. Blockson =

American historian, bibliophile, and collector (1933–2023)

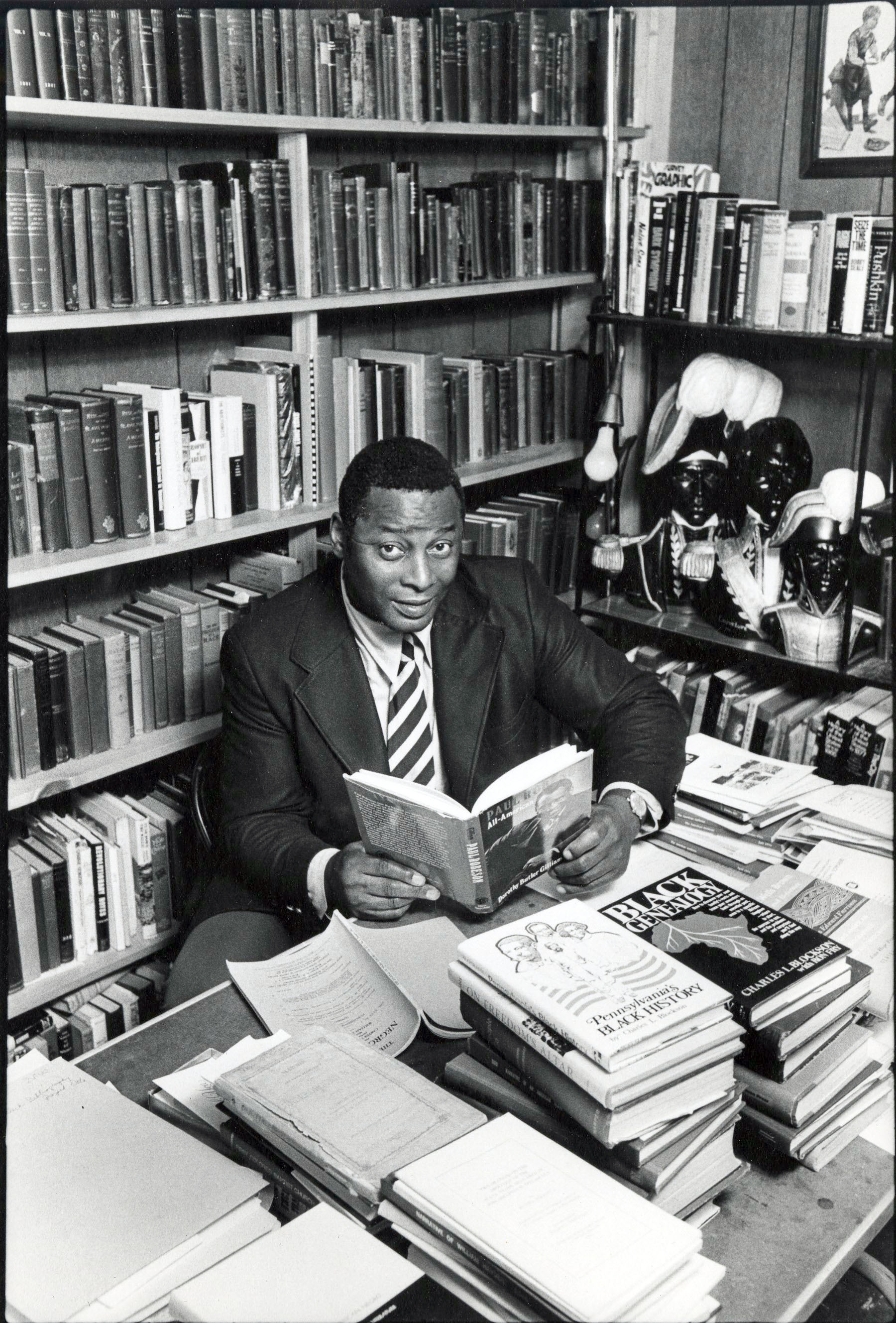
Blockson in his office at home (1971)

Charles Leroy Blockson (December 16, 1933 – June 14, 2023) was an American historian, author, bibliophile, and collector of books, historical documents, art, and other materials related to the history and culture of African Americans, continental Africans, and the African diaspora throughout the rest of the world. He curated two university collections related to the study of African-American history and culture: the Charles L. Blockson Collection of African-Americana and the African Diaspora at Pennsylvania State University and the Charles L. Blockson Afro-American Collection at Temple University.

== Early life and education ==
Born on December 16, 1933, in Norristown, Pennsylvania, Charles Leroy Blockson was the oldest of eight children born to Charles and Annie Blockson. During a history lesson his fourth grade teacher, a white woman, asserted that "Negroes have no history. They were born to serve white people." Blockson went home and told his parents, who assured him that black people do have a history and taught him about prominent African-American men and women. That statement launched Blockson's lifelong journey to unearth, collect, and preserve the history, culture and contributions of African descendants. Book collecting excursions led Blockson to the Salvation Army, antique shops, church bazaars, and Philadelphia, where he discovered many book stores. Blockson became well known among book and artifact dealers, and his passion for collecting ultimately took him around the world, inspired him to write books, and made him one of the foremost experts on the Underground Railroad.

Educated in the Norristown Area School District, Blockson excelled in athletics, including football and track and field. A star athlete at the Norristown High School and Penn State University, he won state and national honors, and participated in the Penn Relays. Blockson was an All-American shot putter for the Penn State Nittany Lions track and field team, finishing 6th in the shot put at the 1954 NCAA track and field championships. While in high school and college, he would go to bookstores when traveling to participate in sports events.

Blockson was a 1956 graduate of Pennsylvania State University and was awarded honorary doctorate degrees from Lincoln University, Holy Family University, Villanova University and Temple University.

== Career ==
Blockson was a co-founder of the African American Museum in Philadelphia; founding member of the Pennsylvania Black History Committee of the Pennsylvania Historical & Museum Commission; past president of the Pennsylvania Abolition Society; former chairman of the National Park Service Underground Railroad Advisory Committee; and former director of the Philadelphia African American Pennsylvania State Marker Project (the largest African-American marker program in the United States).

Among his proudest moments was the commemoration of the Pennsylvania Slave Trade marker at Penn's Landing near the Independence Seaport Museum, unveiled in 2016.

Blockson retired from Temple University in 2006 and served as Curator Emeritus of the Afro-American Collection.

=== The Charles L. Blockson Afro-American Collection ===
In 1984, Blockson donated his collection of cultural artifacts from African-American history to Temple University. The Charles L. Blockson Afro-American Collection, has since expanded further and now contains more than 500,000 books, documents, and photographs.

External videos
- “Holding History: The Collections of Charles L. Blockson”, January 25, 2016, WPSU-TV

He contributed items to the Charles L. Blockson Collection of African-Americana and the African Diaspora at the Pennsylvania State University and the National Museum of African American History and Culture (NAAMHC). He made a donation to the NAAMHC, which included 39 items owned by Harriet Tubman that were bequeathed to him by her grand-niece.

In 2022, the historic Centre Theatre opened up a public exhibition of Blockson's artifacts in his hometown of Norristown.

== Death ==
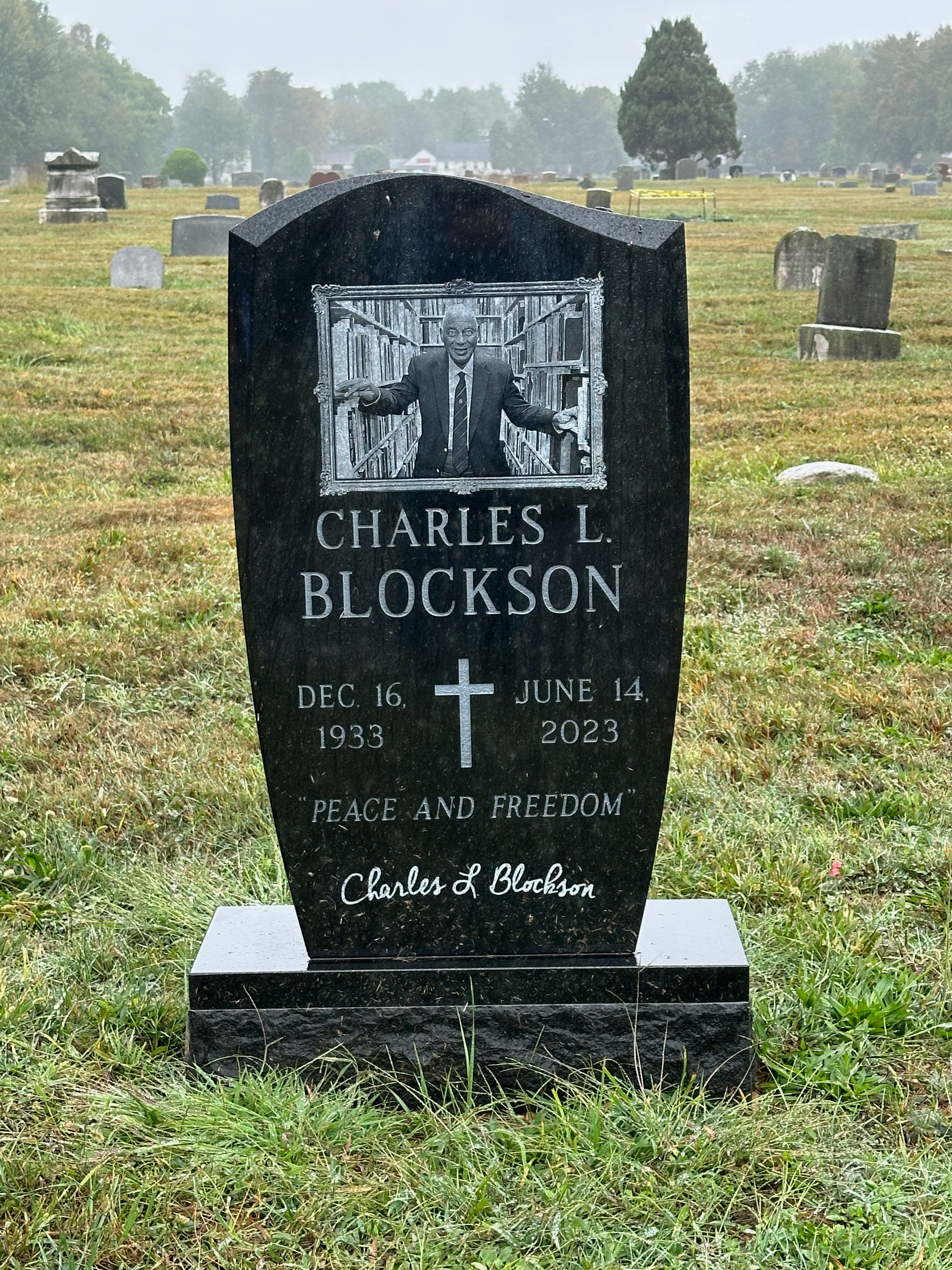
Blockson's grave at Eden Cemetery

Blockson died on June 14, 2023, at the age of 89. Temple University president JoAnne A. Epps died unexpectedly at Blockson's memorial service. He is buried at Eden Cemetery in Collingdale, Pennsylvania.

== Honors ==
In 2017, Charles L. Blockson was the 96th recipient of the Philadelphia Award.

== Bibliography of Charles L. Blockson's works ==
- Pennsylvania's Black History. Philadelphia, Pennsylvania, Portfolio Associates, 1975. Read online https://archive.org/details/pennsylvaniasbla0000bloc,
- Black Genealogy. Prentice-Hall, 1977. Reprinted by Black Classic Press, 1996, ISBN 9780933121539. Read online https://archive.org/details/blackgenealogy00bloc,
- The Underground Railroad in Pennsylvania, Flame International, 1981. ISBN 9780933184213.
- The Underground Railroad: First-Person Narratives of Escapes to Freedom in the North, Prentice Hall, 1987, ISBN 9780425115886. Reprinted 1989 and 1994. Read online https://archive.org/details/undergroundrailr00char,
- Commented Bibliography of 101 Influential Books by and About People of African Descent: A Collector's Choice (1556-1982), Gerit's and Sons, Amsterdam, 1989, ISBN 9789070775032, Read online https://archive.org/details/commentedbibliog0000bloc,
- Catalogue Of The Charles L. Blockson Afro American Collection, A Unit Of The Temple University Libraries, Temple University Press, 1991, ISBN 9780877227496,
- The Journey Of John W. Mosley, Quantum Leap Publisher, 1992, ISBN 9780962716171,
- The Hippocrene Guide to the Underground Railroad, Hippocrene Books, 1995, ISBN 9780781804295. Read online https://archive.org/details/hippocreneguidet00bloc,
- Damn Rare, The Memoirs of an African-American Bibliophile, Quantum Leap Publisher, 1998, ISBN 9781892697004. Read online https://archive.org/details/damnrarememoirso0000bloc/page/n3/mode/2up,
- African Americans In Pennsylvania: Above Ground And Underground: An Illustrated Guide, RB Books, 2001, ISBN 9781879441859,
- Liberty Bell Era: The African American Story, RB Books, 2003, ISBN 9781879441880,
- The Haitian Revolution: Celebrating the First Black Republic, Walsworth Publishing Co., 2004, ISBN 9781578642724,
- The Ballad of the Underground Railroad, Authorhouse, 2008, ISBN 9781434359858,
- The President's House Revisited Behind the Scenes: The Samuel Fraunces Story, Still Publications, 2013, ISBN 9780983668763.
