= JoAnne A. Epps =

American legal scholar (1951–2023)

13th President of Temple University
- In office April 11, 2023 – September 19, 2023
- Preceded by: Jason Wingard
- Succeeded by: Richard M. Englert (acting)

Personal details
- Born: May 28, 1951 Cheltenham, Pennsylvania, U.S.
- Died: September 19, 2023 (aged 72) Philadelphia, Pennsylvania, U.S.
- Spouse: L. Harrison Jay
- Education: Trinity College (BA); Yale University (JD); Temple University (DHL)

JoAnne Adrienne Epps (May 28, 1951 – September 19, 2023) was an American legal scholar and academic. After serving as the executive vice president and provost of Temple University, she was the university's 13th president. She was the first Black woman to be permanently appointed and serve as President of the University.

== Early life and education ==
Joanne Adrienne Epps' father was a machinist, and her mother was an administrator at Temple’s Tyler School of Art (then in Elkins Park). She was born on May 28, 1951, and grew up in Cheltenham, Pennsylvania, graduating from Cheltenham High School in 1969. She was recruited as a promising African-American student to enroll in Trinity College in Hartford, Connecticut, where she became a member of the first class of women at that school.

Epps received a B.A. in 1973 from Trinity and a J.D. in 1976 from Yale Law School. In 2026 Epps posthumously received an Honorary Doctor of Humane Letters from Temple University

== Career ==
Epps began her legal career in 1976, as a deputy city attorney in Los Angeles. She moved back to Philadelphia in 1980, and became an assistant United States attorney. She joined Temple Law School as a faculty member in 1985, and then served as associate dean for academic affairs from 1989 to 2008. In 2009, she was named as a potential Barack Obama Supreme Court candidate. She served as dean of Temple University Beasley School of Law from 2008 to 2016 before becoming provost. She became acting president in 2023, following the resignation of Jason Wingard.

Epps' primary areas of teaching included criminal procedure, evidence, and trial advocacy. She taught Litigation Basics, a course for first-year law students at Temple. National Jurist named Epps one of the 25 most influential leaders in legal education, and her work on curricula and experiential learning in legal education served as inspiration for a new center at Temple Law School for training on accessing civil justice (the Stephen and Sandra Sheller Center for Social Justice). Epps trained Sudanese lawyers who represented victims of the war in Darfur, as well as prosecutors for the UN International Criminal Tribunal for Rwanda.

After her death, Temple's Board of Trustees posthumously named Epps the 13th university president, removing "acting" from her title.

== Personal life and death ==
Epps was married to L. (Lamont) Harrison Jay, a longtime employee in Temple's community affairs office. They lived in Shamong Township, New Jersey. L. (Lamont) Harrison Jay passed away on October 30, 2025 shortly after his 71st birthday.

On September 19, 2023, Epps was onstage at a memorial service for Charles L. Blockson at Temple's Performing Arts Center, when she abruptly fell ill and lost consciousness in her seat. She was taken to Temple University Hospital, where she was pronounced dead at age 72. A colleague announcing her death described her illness as a "sudden episode".

== Tributes ==
- 2026 - Posthumously Honorary Doctor of Humane Letters - Temple University
- 2024 - JoAnne Epps Hero of Justice Award - Pennsylvania Innocence Project
- 2023 - President Emerita designation - Temple University
- 2023 - JoAnne A. Epps Beasley School of Law Scholarship - Temple University
- 2023 - JoAnne A. Epps Undergraduate Scholarship - Temple University
- 2017 - JoAnne Epps Award - Barristers’ Association of Philadelphia
- 2016 - Business Leadership in Diversity Award - Fisher Phillips Law Firm
- 2016 - Inaugural Class Philadelphia Business Hall of Fame - Philadelphia Inquirer
- 2016 - Spirit of Excellence Award - American Bar Association
- 2015 - Ashley Dickerson Award - National Association of Women Lawyers
- 2014 - Justice Sonia Sotomayor Diversity Award - Philadelphia Bar Association
- 2012 - Distinguished Daughter of Pennsylvania - Commonwealth of Pennsylvania
- 2009 - Wiley A. Branton Award - National Bar Association
- 2009 - Justice Sandra Day O'Connor Award - Philadelphia Bar Association

== Selected publications ==
- "Classical Rhetoric and the Modern Trial Lawyer", 36 Litigation 2, with Paul Mark Sandler & Ronald J. Waicukauski, 2010
- "A Tipping Point for Law Schools?". National Law Journal. July 20, 2009.
- The 12 Secrets of Persuasive Argument, with Paul Mark Sandler & Ronald J. Waicukauski, American Bar Association, 2009, ISBN 978-1-60442-594-9
- 101 Vignettes for Improving Trial Evidence: Making and Meeting Objections with Anthony Bocchino and David Sonenshein, ISBN 978-1-60156-968-4, National Institute for Trial Advocacy, 2nd edition: 2023, 1st edition: 2005
- Trial Evidence: Making and Meeting Objections (book, videotape and teacher's manual) with D. Sonenshein & A. Bocchino, ISBN 978-1-55681-233-0, National Institute for Trial Advocacy, 3rd edition: 2004; 2nd edition: 1990
- The Winning Argument, with P. M. Sandler & R. J. Waicukauski, American Bar Association, 2001, ISBN 978-1-57073-938-5
- "Ethos and the Art of Argument", 26 Litigation 31, with Paul Mark Sandler and Ronald J. Waicukauski, 1999
- "Clarifying the Meaning of Federal Rule of Evidence" 703, 36 Boston College Law Review, 53, 1994
- "Passing the Confrontation Clause Stop Sign: Is All Hearsay Constitutionally Admissible?" 77 Kentucky Law Journal, 7, 1988
