= Gail F. Forrest =

- Education: Temple University (PhD)
- Scientific career
- Fields: biomechanics
- Workplaces: Rutgers University; New Jersey Medical School; Kessler Foundation
- Thesis: Role of intersegmental dynamics during locomotion: Implications for control of head stability (2001)

Gail F. Forrest is an associate director of Human Performance and Engineering Research at Kessler Foundation and an associate professor in the Department of Physical Medicine & Rehabilitation at New Jersey Medical School. She has also conducted more than 20 federal, state, and national clinical trials for patients with spinal cord injury. She is also part of the research team winning the Neuromod Prize in 2022 for new collaborative work on the development of neuromodulation therapies.

== Education ==
Gail Forrest received a Ph.D in biomechanics. from Temple University in 2001.

== Career ==
As a postdoctoral fellow at Kessler Foundation Research Center in 2002, Forrest received a grant funding by the New Jersey Commission on Spinal Cord Injury (SCI) Research to evaluate independent walking after incomplete spinal cord injury through body weight support treadmill training.

Dr. Forrest developed knowledge and expertise over time in research involving peripheral and central nervous systems. She has studied neuromuscular abilities for people with SCI. Forrest has conducted numerous, over 20, randomized clinical trials on all levels, from regional to federal. These are focused on individuals with spinal cord injury.

Forrest received state and federal funded grants to research on neuroplasticity, improvement in secondary consequences and restoration of function for individuals after SCI. She has published extensively in the area of neuroplasticity and the use of exoskeleton on posture and walking after SCI.

Forrest also collaborates with the Victory over Paralysis organization as part of the Epidural Simulation Program.

== Awards and funding ==
Forrest is part of the team that won the Neuromod Prize in 2022 for a proposal that presents a pathway for greater independence for people paralysed with spinal cord injury. This is a collaborative project including research teams from the Kessler Foundation, the University of Louisville, Medtronic, and the Johns Hopkins Applied Physics Lab.

She also received major funding from the Craig H. Neilsen Foundation for her ongoing study titled “Epidural Spinal Cord Stimulation: Addressing Spasticity and Motor Function.”
