= Master of Arts (disambiguation) =

A Master of Arts is a high academic degree offered at many universities in Europe, the United States and other countries.

A Master of Arts, Magister Artium, Artium Magister, or Magister in Artibus may also refer to:

- Master of Arts (Oxford, Cambridge and Dublin), an academic status awarded to holders of a Bachelors of Arts degree at the University of Oxford, the University of Cambridge, or the University of Dublin (Trinity College)
- Master of Arts (Scottish Ancient universities), a first, undergraduate honours degree at the ancient universities of Scotland
- Master craftsman, a person who has demonstrated mastery over an art
