= Jacob Gershon-Cohen =

American researcher and physician

Jacob Gershon-Cohen (January 9, 1899 in Philadelphia - February 6, 1971 in Philadelphia) was an American researcher and physician, known for the use of mammography for the early detection of breast cancer.

== Biography ==
Gershon-Cohen was born in Philadelphia to Jewish immigrant parents. He was director of radiology at the Albert Einstein Medical Center, professor of radiology at the University of Pennsylvania, and Professor of Research Radiology at Temple University.

in 1964, he developed mammography to detect breast cancer, which has been a significant step for more effective treatment of the disease. He is also known for the development of thermography.

Gershon-Cohen published more than 400 scientific works during his career.
