= Jerry Del Colliano =

American journalist and author

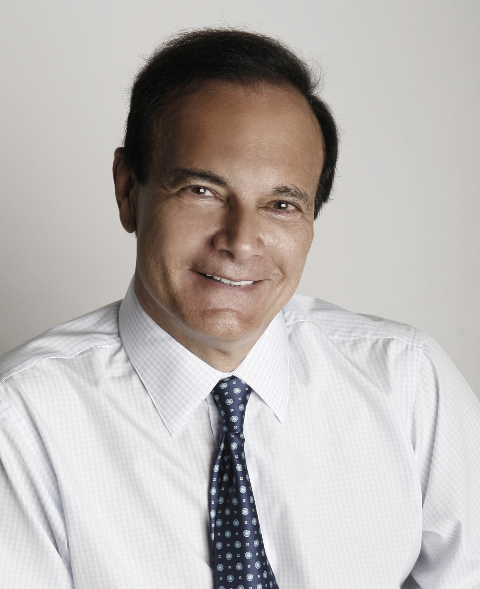
- Born: Gerard Anthony Del Colliano; Hoboken, New Jersey, US
- Education: Temple University, Philadelphia
- Occupations: Publisher author speaker advisor professor program director
- Known for: Convergence of traditional & digital media
- Notable work: Out of Bad Comes Good, The Advantages of Disadvantages
- Spouse: Cheryl
- Website: insidemusicmedia.com

Gerard Anthony "Jerry" Del Colliano is an American journalist, author, former media executive, broadcaster and professor of music industry at the University of Southern California. He is currently a professor at New York University Steinhardt School and is publisher and editor of Inside Music Media and founder and former owner of Inside Radio.

== Early life ==
Born in Hoboken, New Jersey, and raised in Springfield, Pennsylvania, Del Colliano attended Springfield High School where his interest in radio occurred because he was shy as a child and radio became an outlet in overcoming his shyness. After graduating from Springfield High School, Del Colliano earned a B.S. degree in radio-television-film at Temple University, Philadelphia.

== Radio and TV career ==
Del Colliano first started in radio while going to school at Temple University as a co-host of the Saturday evening comedy and variety show called "Party Time" for Temple's radio station WRTI.

Del Colliano's first job in commercial broadcasting was working for Jerry Lee, owner of WBEB, Philadelphia as overnight host of 101.1FM. Del Colliano was hired at the ABC affiliate Channel 6 (now WPVI-TV). During his two years at Channel 6 Del Colliano worked on-camera, did TV news reporting, weather and a feature called "Late & Local" on the 11 o'clock news as well as "booth" announcing.

While at Channel 6, Del Colliano also worked at WFIL as on-air news reporter. Other Philadelphia radio positions that Del Colliano held throughout his broadcast career were news reporter and DJ at WIBG. News reporter at WIP. Program Director at WIFI before returning to WIBG, this time, as Program Director. Del Colliano has been a member of the Broadcast Pioneers of Philadelphia since 2009.

== Inside Radio ==
After overseeing on-air operations at WIBG, Del Colliano thought he wanted to continue programming radio stations but instead got the idea to start a radio trade publication to use his journalism background and because he came across a book in B. Dalton bookstore called How to Make $25,000 a Year Writing Newsletters. That book motivated Del Colliano to start a niche publication for the radio industry. Inside Radio started in 1975, but initially did not receive great support. Del Colliano almost quit the venture to return to radio programming when he got the idea to make the publication more investigative and not like a traditional media trade publication.

Inside Radio began as a weekly printed newsletter specialized in radio news as opposed to the popular publication of the day "Broadcasting Magazine" that covered both radio and TV and the emerging cable industries.

Along with trade publication Inside Radio, Del Colliano started Radio Only in 1982, a full color magazine that accepted advertising in addition to the weekly printed newsletter that did not at that time accept advertising. While both publications were in circulation, Del Colliano had the idea that he wanted to deliver the news everyday rather than weekly which was customary.

Before the Internet and through the use of a fax machine on February 11, 1991 Inside Radio was converted from a weekly printed newsletter to a daily news publication that contained advertising as well as news and was faxed to its subscribers. Subsequent to Inside Radio becoming a daily publication, Radio Only magazine was folded.

After radio consolidation that was enabled by the Telecommunications Act of 1996, Del Colliano began publishing a journal to keep track of all radio stations and companies being bought and sold. In 1996 Who Owns What was started and would become another faxed publication that would show the top 50 radio groups by revenue, stations and audience along with all transactions that occurred weekly for paid subscribers. In 1999, Inside Radio would continue to be faxed while having an online presence.

== Lawsuit ==
In 2000, Del Colliano was served with a $100 million lawsuit from Clear Channel alleging inter alia, tortious interference with business relations and contractual relations. The lawsuit was filed in Manhattan New York Federal Court. Del Colliano countersued Clear Channel for $125 million refuting the charges and alleging inter alia, trademark infringement, trademark dilution, unfair competition and damages to his reputation and Inside Radio's. In court papers Clear Channel wanted Del Colliano to reveal his sources on stories that he wrote pertaining to what was going on inside Clear Channel, but he refused. Clear Channel would try moving the case to Texas but would be denied and in August 2002 right before the case was to go to trial both parties settled. While terms of the deal were not disclosed, Clear Channel acquired Inside Radio.

== USC ==
In early 2004, Del Colliano accepted an appointment as Professor of Music Industry at the University of Southern California that would span from 2004 to 2008. At USC Del Colliano was also Director of Executive Programs and authored and taught two 400 level courses at USC Thornton School of Music. The first course was titled "Music, Broadcasting and the Mobile Future" and the second course was "Music Media Lab" a collaborative course underwritten by broadcasting and music companies looking for student strategies about specific problems or challenges that they faced. Emmis Broadcasting (twice), Warner Records, Universal Music and XM Satellite Radio were underwriters of specific semester workgroups that culminated in presentation breakfasts at USC and the presentation of a report of findings.

== Inside Music Media ==
While working at USC, Del Colliano started a blog called Inside Music Media a tool used for teaching generational media that included radio and related industries for his students in his classes. Once the Clear Channel non-compete expired in August 2006, Del Colliano expanded Inside Music Media and made it available to the public. This would be his entry back into the radio, music and broadcasting industry after a four-year sabbatical. For the first four years Inside Music Media was free and then in October 2010 Del Colliano converted it into a paid subscription-based website.

Del Colliano has been quoted in numerous publications like The Washington Post, The New York Times, The Wall Street Journal on matters pertaining to talk radio and Rush Limbaugh and in publications like Rolling Stone, Associated Press, Forbes, Fortune, Newsweek, Columbia Journalism Review and The New York Post among others covering the crossroads of linear broadcasting and one-to-one digital content and the music business.

== Dale Carnegie ==
In 1980 Del Colliano enrolled in Dale Carnegie Course. After taking the course Del Colliano continued on and became a Graduate Assistant and then a Dale Carnegie certified trainer for 11 years. During the 11 years as an instructor Del Colliano earned numerous awards for graduating 100% of his class.

== Author ==
In 2011 Del Colliano published his first book, 'Out of bad Comes Good – The Advantages of Disadvantages' through publishing house Morgan James. This book touched on a different area in Del Colliano's life, one on the human condition and the other on his past teachings of Dale Carnegie.

== Motivational blog ==
In September 2012, Del Colliano debuted a blog JerryDelColliano.com devoted to motivation, inspiration and innovation.

== New York University ==
In 2018 Professor Del Colliano joined the faculty at New York University Steinhardt School. Starting in the spring of 2019 Del Colliano will teach a course called Music in the Media Business. In spring 2023, Professor Del Colliano created a new course "Stress-free Living and Working in the Music Business" that deals with fear of failure, pressure to succeed, performance anxiety and the challenges that affect the confidence that it takes to know how to make a life and a living in music and the performing arts. Jerry Del Colliano lives in Moorestown, NJ with his wife Cheryl. He has two children, Jerry, Jr and Daria.

== Awards and nominations ==
- Broadcast Pioneers of Philadelphia Hall of Fame 2016
