= Henry H. Kessler =

- Born: Henry Howard Kessler; April 10, 1896; Newark, New Jersey
- Died: January 18, 1978 (aged 81)
- Education: Cornell University Medical School, Columbia University
- Occupations: Physician, surgeon

Henry Howard Kessler (April 10, 1896 – January 18, 1978) was an American physician, surgeon, and pioneer in rehabilitation medicine and orthopedic surgery. He focused on treating the whole person, rather than just the physical ailment. He founded the Kessler Institute for Rehabilitation and wrote five books on rehabilitation medicine.

== Early life ==
Kessler was born in Newark, New Jersey on April 10, 1896. His father, Simon, was a carpenter, and his mother, Bertha Portuguese Kessler, worked in a hat factory. Kessler attended Newark public schools as well as DeWitt High School in New York City. He entered Cornell University when he was 16, and graduated with his medical degree from Cornell University Medical School in 1919. Kessler interned at Newark City Hospital for a year and a half. After his graduation, he established a private practice in orthopedic surgery in Newark.

== Career ==
In 1919, he joined the New Jersey State Rehabilitation Commission, the first rehabilitation commission in the nation, as an assistant to Fred H. Albee. He later became both commissioner and its medical director.

Kessler received both his master's and doctoral certificates from Columbia University in 1932 and 1934. He volunteered to serve in the United States Navy as an orthopedic surgeon during World War II. He became a captain in 1941. He was head of the orthopedic department at the C.U.B. 13 unit, as well as chief of orthopedics at Base Hospital No. 2 in New Hebrides and the Mare Island Naval Hospital in California. Through his efforts a new branch of medicine, physical medicine and rehabilitation, which included physical and emotional healing, was born. Kessler opened the Mare Island amputee center. He was discharged in 1946. After World War II, Kessler became a director of a disabled children's home. Kessler later became an orthopedic physician at Newark City Hospital, Newark Beth Israel Hospital, and the Hospital for Crippled Children in Newark.

In 1948, he founded the Kessler Institute for Rehabilitation in West Orange with four patients. Kessler became medical director of the organization. Kessler stated that the purpose of the institute was to "educate the public to the good qualities of the patients." The Kessler Institute was the first rehabilitation center in New Jersey, and the third center in the United States. The Kessler Institute for Rehabilitation held a semiannual Congenital Amputee Clinic and Conference, led by Kessler. He was medical director of the rehabilitation program for children born with an absence of one or more limbs, sponsored by the New Jersey Department of Health's Crippled Children's Program through United Hospitals. A grant from the Victoria Foundation allowed the institute to expand the program for amputee children.

Kessler received the first President's Award of the Committee on Employment of the Physically Handicapped in 1952 under President Truman, and the Albert Lasker Award in 1954. In 1962, Kessler oversaw the establishment of a new hospital to aid disabled people in Tegucigalpa, Honduras. He wrote his autobiography, The Knife Is Not Enough, in 1968. Joseph G. Minish presented an article, "Extraordinary People Seek an Ordinary Destiny", written by Kessler to Congress in September 1969 in order to bring to light the discrimination and prejudice that disabled people encounter.

Kessler was one of 15 members appointed to the National Commission on State Workmen's Compensation Law by the President under the Occupational Safety and Health Act of 1970. The commission's final report, issued July 31, 1972, found that workman's compensation coverage was inadequate in almost every state and had a flawed delivery system. In December 1972, the Governor named seven people, including Kessler, to the New Jersey Workmen's Compensation Study Commission. In September 1973, the commission released a 100-page report that included a list of 14 major deficiencies in the workmen's compensation program and offered recommended changes. As a result of the findings of these commissions, Governor Brendan Byrne focused on workmen's compensation in his 1973 election. Afterwards, he assigned top Department of Labor and Industry officials to rewrite the existing statute. Kessler was a consultant in activities of the United Nations, the World Veterans Federation, the World Health Organization, Rehabilitation International and the United States Government.

Kessler died on January 18, 1978. After his death, a tribute was given in Kessler's honor during a February 1978 meeting of the United States Senate. A collection of his papers is held at the Rutgers University Libraries.

== Personal life ==
Kessler had three children with his first wife, Jessica Winnick. He later married Estelle Cohen, who had two children from a previous marriage.

== Publications ==
- Henry H. Kessler (1968). The Knife Is Not Enough. W. W. Norton.
- Henry H. Kessler, Eugene Rachlis (1959). Peter Stuyvesant and His New York. Random House.
- Henry H. Kessler (1955). Low Back Pain in Industry.
- Henry H. Kessler (1953). Rehabilitation of the Physically Handicapped. Columbia University Press.
- Henry H. Kessler (1950). The Principles and Practices of Rehabilitation. Arno Pr.
- Henry H. Kessler (1947). Cineplasty. Charles C. Thomas.
- Henry H. Kessler (1935). The Crippled And The Disabled. Columbia University Press.
- Henry H. Kessler (1931). Accidental Injuries. Lea & Febiger.
