= Patrick Tolan =

American psychologist, academic, and author

Patrick Henry Tolan
- Occupations: Psychologist, academic, and author

Academic background
- Education: B.A., Psychology; M.A., Psychology; Ph.D., Psychology
- Alma mater: Temple University; University of Tennessee

Academic work
- Institutions: University of Illinois at Chicago (UIC); University of Virginia

Patrick Henry Tolan is an American psychologist, academic, and author. He is the Founding Director and now emeritus Director of the Youth-Nex Center for Effective Youth Development, an emeritus professor of psychiatry at the University of Illinois at Chicago (UIC), and the Charles S. Robb Professor Emeritus at the University of Virginia.

Tolan's research has focused on theory, methods, and policy, related to prevention of child and adolescent mental health and behavior problems and promotion of healthy development. The first half of his career focused on sound risk prediction and testing innovative intervention to prevent delinquency, violence, and related problems of youth. He later shifted to focus on how positive development is promoted. His contributions illuminated a developmental ecology perspective, family dynamics, and community factors that influence youth and adolescent well-being. His scholarly contributions include large-scale randomized-control studies and publications in journals such as Development and Psychopathology, Journal of Clinical Child Psychology, and Journal of Family Psychology. He has also authored book chapters and edited books, including Preventing Youth Substance Abuse: Science-based Programs for Children and Adolescents.

On January 16, 2010, Chicago's City Council and Mayor declared "Patrick H. Tolan Day" in honor of Tolan's contributions to children's and families' mental health. He has also been listed among the Top 2% of Scientists, received the Presidential Award from the Society for Prevention Research (SPR), and the Nicholas Hobbs Award from APA.

Prior to founding the Youth-Nex Center for Effective Youth Development at the University of Virginia, for ten years, Tolan served as director of the Institute for Juvenile Research at the University of Illinois.

== Education and career ==
Tolan completed his B.A. in Psychology from Temple University in 1978. He earned an M.A. in Psychology and a Ph.D. in Psychology from the University of Tennessee in 1980 and 1983, respectively. Between 1983 and 1985, he undertook a Clinical Research Training Program Fellowship at the University of Chicago with Daniel Offer and Bertram Cohler. He began his academic career in 1985 at DePaul University, serving as an Assistant Professor in the Department of Psychology until 1989 followed by an appointment as an Associate Professor from 1989 to 1990. Starting in 1990, he joined the faculty at UIC as Research Director at the Institute of Juvenile Research. From 2002 to 2009, he also held a professorship in the School of Public Health. In 2009, he joined the University of Virginia as a professor in the School of Education, serving until 2017, with an appointment as the Charles S. Robb Professor until his retirement in 2022. Since 2022, he has been Charles S. Robb Professor Emeritus at the University of Virginia and emeritus professor of psychiatry at UIC since 2009.

== Research ==
Tolan's research has focused on examining child and adolescent development, promoting positive growth, and exploring how disadvantaged neighborhoods, socioeconomic challenges, and environmental stressors impact aggression and well-being. He led the two-decade Chicago Youth Development Study, bringing a focus for longitudinal tracking of risk and resilience among inner-city boys and their families. Among the major findings was that strong family functioning mitigated the effects of community violence exposure, reducing violence perpetration, while poor family dynamics increased risk and perpetuated aggressive behavior. He also launched in 1991, with Nancy Guerra, one of the first randomized trials for violence prevention in impoverished urban communities, empirically demonstrating the benefits of cognitive training and family support groups for reducing risk.

In 2013, Tolan launched the Compassionate Schools Project in Louisville, Kentucky, which assigned schools randomly to a health curriculum emphasizing compassion, social-emotional skills, and health habits. The eight-year study, demonstrated that the '21st century health skills' curriculum reduced behavior problems and increased developmental capabilities, with effects strongest in high-poverty communities.

Tolan chaired the American Psychological Association Task Force on Children's Mental Health (2000), from which he and Kenneth Dodge proposed a system prioritizing children's mental health by emphasizing accessible clinical care, prevention, primary care interventions, and culturally competent, family-focused services. Moreover, he documented in one of his monographs that mentoring was effective in reducing juvenile delinquency and related issues, with structured programs yielding positive outcomes in aggression, drug use, and academic achievement.

== Awards and honors ==
- 1995 – Fellow, American Psychological Association (APA)
- 2008 – Presidential Citation, APA
- 2012 – Distinguished Alumnus Award, University of Tennessee
- 2013 – Fellow, Society for Prevention Research
- 2016 – Nicholas Hobbs Award, APA
- 2018 – Presidential Award, Society for Prevention Research (SPR)
- 2020 – Top 2% of Scientists, Stanford University Roster
- 2020 – Advances in Culture and Diversity in Prevention Science Award, SPR

== Bibliography ==
=== Books ===
- Multi-systemic Structural-strategic Interventions for Child and Adolescent Behavior Problems (1990) ISBN 9781138873131
- Researching Community Psychology: Issues of Theory and Methods (1990) ISBN 9781557980984
- Handbook of clinical research and practice with adolescents (1992) ISBN 978-0471613336
- Preventing Youth Substance Abuse: Science-based Programs for Children and Adolescents (2007) ISBN 9781591473077
- Disruptive Behavior Disorders (2013) ISBN 9781461475576
- Gene-Environment Transactions in Developmental Psychopathology: The Role in Intervention Research (2017) ISBN 9783319492278

=== Selected articles ===
- Tolan, P., & Guerra, N. (1994). What works in reducing adolescent violence. Boulder, CO: The Center for the Study and Prevention of Violence.
- Tolan, P. H. (2001). Emerging themes and challenges in understanding youth violence involvement. Journal of Clinical Child Psychology, 30(2), 233–239.
- Tolan, P. H., & Gorman-Smith, D. (2002). What violence prevention research can tell us about developmental psychopathology. Development and Psychopathology, 14(4), 713–729.
- Tolan, P. H., Gorman-Smith, D., & Henry, D. B. (2003). The developmental ecology of urban males' youth violence. Developmental Psychology, 39(2), 274.
- Tolan, P., Gorman-Smith, D., & Henry, D. (2004). Supporting families in a high-risk setting: proximal effects of the SAFEChildren preventive intervention. Journal of Consulting and Clinical Psychology, 72(5), 855.
- Tolan, P. H., Henry, D. B., Schoeny, M. S., Lovegrove, P., & Nichols, E. (2014). Mentoring programs to affect delinquency and associated outcomes of youth at risk: A comprehensive meta-analytic review. Journal of Experimental Criminology, 10, 179–206.
- Multisite Violence Prevention Project. (2014). Targeting high‐risk, socially influential middle school students to reduce aggression: Universal versus selective preventive intervention effects. Journal of Research on Adolescence, 24(2), 364–382.
- Tolan, P. (2014). Future directions for positive development intervention research. Journal of Clinical Child & Adolescent Psychology, 43(4), 686–694.
- Tolan, P., Ross, K., Arkin, N., Godine, N., & Clark, E. (2016). Toward an integrated approach to positive development: Implications for intervention. Applied Developmental Science, 20(3), 214–236.
- Gaylord-Harden, N. K., Barbarin, O., Tolan, P. H., & Murry, V. M. (2018). Understanding development of African American boys and young men: Moving from risks to positive youth development. American Psychologist, 73(6), 753.
