= Encyclopedia of American Studies =

- Discipline: History, American studies
- Language: English
- Edited by: Simon J. Bronner

Publication details
- History: 2008-present
- Publisher: Johns Hopkins University Press (United States)
- Frequency: Quarterly

Standard abbreviations
- ISO 4: Encycl. Am. Stud.

Links
- Journal homepage

The Encyclopedia of American Studies (EAS) covers the history and culture of the United States, from pre-colonial days to the present, and the American Studies movement. The Encyclopedia of American Studies first appeared in 2001 as a four-volume print edition, published by Grolier Press. The EAS was sponsored by the American Studies Association, which appointed an editorial board consisting of Johnnella Butler, Robert Gross, and Miles Orvell. (Robert Gross was replaced by Jay Mechling during the first year of planning.)

== Intent ==
The intent behind the EAS was to create a work that would serve the needs of scholars, graduate students, college students and a high school audience, a work that would be accessible yet authoritative and that would cover the range of American history and culture from an interdisciplinary perspective. Articles in the EAS range from the singular features of American material culture (e.g. the Statue of Liberty or Barbie Dolls) to the broadest concepts of American intellectual culture (e.g. Exceptionalism and Millennialism) as well as the methods and theories of American Studies.

== Online version ==
In 2003, the EAS appeared in its initial online version, and in 2005, Johns Hopkins University Press took over as publisher, working with the American Studies Association, and making the EAS a regular benefit of membership in the ASA. Miles Orvell served as Editor in Chief of the online version until 2011 and organized an EAS Advisory Board appointed by the American Studies Association. In 2011, Simon J. Bronner, distinguished professor of American Studies at Pennsylvania State University, Harrisburg, took over the reins of the EAS as Editor in Chief. Participation in the EAS grew with the involvement of students, staff, faculty, and regional scholars around the doctoral program in American Studies at Penn State Harrisburg in addition to an international roster of contributors and advisory board members.

The online version added illustrations, related web links, and bibliographic listings to the original entries. The EAS also sponsored a Forum on the American Studies Association website with essays related to the mission of the Encyclopedia such as "Encyclopedias and American Studies" with a panel of encyclopedia editors and "Organizing a Class on Organizing" by Mark Rudd. The EAS is expanded and updated quarterly, with an ever-growing database of articles, illustrations, and bibliographies that stay current with the evolution of American Studies scholarship. In 2011, the EAS had over 700 entries, including new topics such as "transnationalism," "American Studies: A Discipline," and "Women and Labor."
