= Paul Mark Sandler =

American lawyer

Paul Mark Sandler is a Maryland trial lawyer and author of numerous books on trial advocacy and litigation.

A partner in the law firm of Shapiro Sher Guinot & Sandler, P.A., he represents businesses and individuals in commercial lawsuits, employment disputes, product liability claims, antitrust matters, and securities cases. He also handles appeals and defends clients in white-collar criminal cases.

Sandler is a Fellow in the American College of Trial Lawyers. He is also listed in Best Lawyers in America® and in Chambers USA, a guide to leading lawyers throughout the United States. The 2014 edition of Chambers USA quotes a source as saying, "He is one of the finest trial lawyers in Maryland."

Sandler is the author, co-author or editor of ten books on trial advocacy and appellate law. A January 2011 cover story on Sandler in Maryland Super Lawyers magazine quotes Judge Lynne A. Battaglia of the Court of Appeals in Maryland as saying that Sandler, "has been immersed in efforts to educate every member of the bar and bench." In the same article, US District Judge Marvin J. Garbis is quoted as saying that Sandler is "one of the few lawyers to have an instinct for the art of persuasion."

Sandler was founder and first chair of the Maryland State Bar Association (MSBA) Litigation Section. He is also a former Secretary of the Litigation Section of the American Bar Association. He serves on the boards of Baltimore's Stevenson University, the Saint Joseph Medical Center Foundation, the Cal Ripken Sr. Foundation, and the Maryland Charter of the National Kidney Foundation. He is past president of the Maryland Public Television Foundation Board (2001–2004) and from 2000 to 2012 he served on the board of Maryland's Legal Aid Bureau.
