= Organization Development Journal =

- Discipline: Organizational psychology
- Language: English
- Edited by: Dr. Joanne C. Preston

Publication details
- Publisher: The International Society for Organization Development (United States)

Standard abbreviations
- ISO 4: Organ. Dev. J.

Indexing
- ISSN: 0889-6402

Links
- Journal homepage

The Organization Development Journal is a peer reviewed journal, published four times a year in the United States on organization development and work psychology. The current editor is Dr. Joanne C. Preston., It is published through The International Society for Organization Development (ISOD).
