= Elizabeth D. Peña =

Speech-language pathologist

- Occupations: Professor and Associate Dean of Faculty Development & Diversity
- Known for: Bilingual English-Spanish Assessment (BESA) Test of English Language Learners (TELL)
- Awards: ASHA Honors of the Association Award (2024)

Academic background
- Education: Temple University (PhD, 1993) San Francisco State University (MS,1984) University of Redlands (BA, 1982)

Academic work
- Discipline: Linguistics, Speech-language Pathology, Bilingualism
- Institutions: School of Education, University of California, Irvine

Elizabeth Dora Peña is a certified speech-language pathologist and Fellow of the American Speech-Language-Hearing Association (ASHA). She is widely known for her work on bilingualism, language disorders in children, and the development of assessment tools for linguistically diverse populations. Peña holds the position of Professor in the University of California, Irvine School of Education, where she previously served as the Associate Dean of Faculty Development and Diversity.

== Education ==
Peña earned her B.A. in Communicative Disorders and Spanish from the University of Redlands in May 1982. She continued her education at San Francisco State University, where she received her M.S. in Communicative Disorders in May 1984. ln 1993, she completed her Ph.D. in Speech-Language-Hearing at Temple University. Her doctoral dissertation, titled Dynamic Assessment: A Non-Biased Approach for Assessing the Language of Young Children, was supervised by Aquiles Iglesias.

== Career ==
Peña's career started with a clinical work experience. Peña worked as a bilingual speech-language pathologist at Children's Hospital Oakland (1985-1988) and the San Francisco Head Start program (1984-1986). During this period, she served as the Director of ACCESS Speech & Language in San Francisco until 1994. Her clinical work in early childhood programs included positions as speech-language early interventionist at CO-MHAR Early Intervention Program in Philadelphia (1990-1992), and supervising speech-language pathologist at Rainbow Community Head Start in Philadelphia (1989-1992).

In 1992-1993, she held teaching positions at San Jose State University and San Diego State University. During these early years, Peña focused on teaching and supervising bilingual speech-language pathology students, sharing her expertise in dynamic assessment and bilingual language development.

In 1995, Peña joined the faculty at the University of Texas at Austin, and over the next two decades, she held various roles, including Assistant Professor, Associate Professor, and ultimately Professor in the Department of Communication Sciences and Disorders. She also served as the Graduate Advisor and was honored as the George Christian Centennial Professor in Communication from 2014 to 2017.

In 2017, Peña became a Professor in the University of California, Irvine School of Education. She then became the Associate Dean of Faculty Development and Diversity in 2019 and served until July, 2024.

== Grants ==
In 2019, Peña received a grant of $1.25 million, for a five-year training from the U.S. Department of Education to develop a Special Education emphasis within UCI's Ph.D. in Education program. This grant, awarded by the Office of Special Education and Rehabilitation Services, marks the first pre-doctoral training grant in the history of the School of Education. In addition to the Department of Education's grant, the UCI School of Education and UCI Graduate Division contributed an additional $1.25 million to support the program's development. The new emphasis was designed to address critical shortages in Special Education expertise, focusing specifically on language and reading disabilities among English learners.

In January 2020, the National Institute on Deafness and Other Communication Disorders awarded Peña a $3.18 million grant to develop and validate the Test of English Language Learners. The focus of this five-year project is to create an English morphosyntax test that will help diagnose developmental language disorder in bilingual children who have Spanish or Vietnamese as their primary language.

== Research ==
Peña's work focuses on bilingualism, language impairment, and the development of culturally appropriate assessment tools for children from diverse linguistic backgrounds.

Dynamic Assessment and Intervention is a critical study led by Peña focused on dynamic assessment, a non-biased approach to evaluating language abilities in bilingual children. Instead of relying solely on static test scores, this method assesses a child's learning potential through interactive and scaffolded testing. Peña's work provides a more accurate way to differentiate language impairments from language differences, particularly for children from diverse backgrounds. Her research has focused on creating assessments that accurately measure semantic skills in children.

Peña started the development of the Bilingual English-Spanish Assessment (BESA) in 1998. Conducted through Moody College's Human Abilities in Bilingual Language Acquisition Lab, the research was funded by the National Institute on Deafness and Other Communication Disorders.

== Representative publications ==
- Bedore, Lisa M.; Peña, Elizabeth D. (January 2008). "Assessment of Bilingual Children for Identification of Language Impairment: Current Findings and Implications for Practice". International Journal of Bilingual Education and Bilingualism. 11 (1): 1–29. doi:10.2167/beb392.0.
- Bedore, Lisa M.; PeñA, Elizabeth D.; Summers, Connie L.; Boerger, Karin M.; Resendiz, Maria D.; Greene, Kai; Bohman, Thomas M.; Gillam, Ronald B. (July 2012). "The measure matters: Language dominance profiles across measures in Spanish–English bilingual children". Bilingualism: Language and Cognition. 15 (3): 616–629. doi:10.1017/S1366728912000090. PMC 3615884. PMID 23565049.
- Bohman, Thomas M.; Bedore, Lisa M.; Peña, Elizabeth D.; Mendez-Perez, Anita; Gillam, Ronald B. (May 2010). "What you hear and what you say: language performance in Spanish–English bilinguals". International Journal of Bilingual Education and Bilingualism. 13 (3): 325–344. doi:10.1080/13670050903342019. PMC 3128885. PMID 21731899.
- Fiestas, Christine E.; Peña, Elizabeth D. (April 2004). "Narrative Discourse in Bilingual Children: Language and Task Effects". Language, Speech, and Hearing Services in Schools. 35 (2): 155–168. doi:10.1044/0161-1461(2004/016). PMID 27764353.
- Peña, Elizabeth D. (July 2007). "Lost in Translation: Methodological Considerations in Cross-Cultural Research". Child Development. 78 (4): 1255–1264. doi:10.1111/j.1467-8624.2007.01064.x. PMID 17650137.
- Peña, Elizabeth D.; Gutierrez-Clellen, Vera F.; Iglesias, Aquiles; Goldstein, Brian A.; Bedore, Lisa (2018). Bilingual English-Spanish Assessment (BESA) Manual. Brookes Publishing. ISBN 978-1-68125-280-3.
