= Nathan Katz (professor) =

American academic

Nathan Katz is an American writer who is Distinguished Professor, Emeritus, in the School of International and Public Affairs, Florida International University (FIU). He also served as the Bhagawan Mahavir Professor of Jain Studies, Founder-Director of the Program in the Study of Spirituality, Director of Jewish Studies, and Founding Chair of the Department of Religious Studies.

== Education and career ==
Raised in Camden, New Jersey, Katz attended Temple University. After earning his B.A. in 1970, he worked for two years with the U. S. Information Agency in Afghanistan and spent a year in India studying classical languages before returning to Temple for graduate studies in Religion. He was a Fulbright dissertation fellow in Sri Lanka and India between 1976 and 1978, and was awarded his Ph.D. in 1979. He then joined the faculty in Buddhist Studies at Naropa University in Colorado, and after a year became Assistant Professor of Religion at Williams College in Massachusetts. In 1984 he joined the faculty of the University of South Florida in Tampa, and a decade later was brought to FIU to start up a new Department of Religious Studies. He was also instrumental is starting up FIU's programs in Jewish Studies, in Asian Studies, in Jain Studies, and in the Study of Spirituality.

He is best known for his work about Indo-Judaic Studies. He has written books on Indian Jewish communities, and in 2002 convened an international seminar on this topic at Oxford University, bringing together scholars from North America, India, Europe and Israel. The conference resulted in Indo-Judaic Studies in the 21st Century, a book that was the focus of an academic panel at the 2008 annual meeting of the American Academy of Religion.

Katz was selected as a delegate to the 1990 Tibetan-Jewish dialogue hosted by the Dalai Lama and reported in the best-selling The Jew in the Lotus. He reciprocated the hospitality in 1999 when the Dalai Lama first visited FIU for an honorary doctorate, as well as his 2004 and 2010 visits.

Katz also serves as an adjunct professor of Hinduism at Hindu University of America in Orlando, as academic dean of Chaim Yakov Shlomo College of Jewish Studies, an Orthodox rabbinical school in Surfside, and at the Sivananda Yoga Ashram Bahamas.

After his retirement in 2015, he and his wife Ellen S. Goldberg established Indo-Judaic, Inc., and they lead Jewish-interest tours of India. Katz continues to edit the Journal of Indo-Judaic Studies, as well as writing and consulting.

== Awards and honors ==
Katz has been awarded four Fulbright grants for research and teaching in India and Sri Lanka, and was able to accept two.

His book, Who Are the Jews of India?, was a Finalist for the 2000 National Jewish Book Award and won the 2004 Vak Devi Saraswati Saman Award from India. His co-authored book, The Last Jews of Cochin (1993), was a Nota Bene selection of the Chronicle of Higher Education.

He won the President's Award for Achievement and Excellence, FIU's highest internal honor, in 2001, as well as FIU Faculty Senate Awards for Research (2005) and Service (2001). He was also named “Scholar of the Year” by the University of South Florida in 1990.

He also received statewide award for teaching excellence in 1994, and has been named a “Master Teacher” an unprecedented thirteen times by the Florida Center for Teachers of the Florida Humanities Council. He was appointed Kauffman Professor in Global Entrepreneurship at FIU for the 2009–10 academic year.

== Selected books ==
- ' Jews : India – Selected Essays by Nathan Katz.' (New Delhi, Manohar, 2022).
- Indian Jews – An Annotated Bibliography, 1665–2005 (New Delhi, Manohar, 2013).
- Spiritual Journey Home – Eastern Mysticism to the Western Wall (Jersey City, NJ, Ktav Publishing House, 2009).
- Indo-Judaic Studies in the Twenty-First century: A View from the Margin, editor-in-chief/co-author (New York, Palgrave Macmillan, April 2007).
- Kashrut, Caste and Kabbalah: The Religious Life of the Jews of Cochin, with Ellen S. Goldberg (New Delhi, Manohar, 2005).
- Who Are the Jews of India? (Berkeley, Los Angeles and London, University of California Press, 2000).
- Studies of Indian-Jewish Identity, editor and co-author (New Delhi, Manohar, 1995 [2nd ed., 1999]).
- The Last Jews of Cochin: Jewish Identity in Hindu India, with Ellen S. Goldberg. Foreword by Daniel J. Elazar (Columbia, SC, Univ. of South Carolina Press, 1993).
- Tampa Bay's Asian-Origin Religious Communities (Tampa, National Conference of Christians and Jews, "A Religious History of Tampa Bay" Research Reports no. 1, 1991).
- Ethnic Conflict in Buddhist Societies: Sri Lanka, Thailand and Burma, co-editor and co-author (London, Frances Pinter Publishers, 1988).
- Buddhist and Western Psychology, editor and co-author. Introduction by Chogyam Trungpa, Rinpoche (Boulder, CO, Prajña Press/ Shambhala, 1983).
- Buddhist Images of Human Perfection: The Arahant of the Sutta Pitaka Compared with the Bodhisattva and the Mahasiddha (Delhi, Motilal Banarsidass, 1982; 2nd ed. 1989; 3rd ed. 2004).
- Buddhist and Western Philosophy, editor and co-author. Foreword by the Dalai Lama (New Delhi, Sterling, 1981).
- Tibetan Buddhism (New Haven, CT, Yale Divinity School, Visual Education Series, 1974).
- Afghan Legends: A Textbook in Reading English as a Second Language (Kabul, U.S. Information Service, 1972).
