= Stephen Sheehi =

Stephen Sheehi (اسطفان شيحا) is an Arab American (Lebanese) scholar of Middle Eastern studies, Arab intellectual history, psychoanalysis, and decolonial theory. He is the Sultan Qaboos Professor of Middle East Studies at the College of William & Mary, where he teaches in the Asian and Middle East Studies Program, Arabic Studies, and the Asian and Pacific Islander American Studies Program. He is also the founding Director of the Decolonizing Humanities Project at William & Mary.

Sheehi is widely recognized for his influential scholarship at the intersection of Arab modernity, settler‑colonial critique, critical race theory, and psychoanalytic thought. His research has profoundly shaped contemporary understandings of Arab subjectivity, Islamophobia, Palestinian liberation, and the cultural histories of photography in the Arab world. His work has appeared in numerous academic journals, edited volumes, and public forums, contributing to both scholarly and activist communities.

== Works ==
=== Books ===
- Foundations of Modern Arab Identity (University Press of Florida, 2004).
- Islamophobia: The Ideological Campaign Against Muslims (Clarity Press, 2011)
- The Arab Imago: A Social History of Portrait Photography, 1860–1910 (Princeton University Press, 2016)
- Psychoanalysis Under Occupation: Practicing Resistance in Palestine (with Lara Sheehi; Routledge, 2021/22) is a critically acclaimed work that examines the intersection of psychoanalysis and Palestinian resistance under occupation. The book won the 2022 Palestine Book Award for Best Academic Book on Palestine. It has been the subject of numerous interviews and discussions, including a detailed review on Jadaliyya, which explores its theoretical and practical contributions to understanding the psychological dimensions of settler colonialism.
- Camera Palaestina: Photography and Displaced Histories of Palestine (with Issam Nassar & Salim Tamari; University of California Press, 2022) explores the role of photography in the history and displacement of Palestine.
