= Miles Orvell =

Professor of English and American studies

Academic background
- Education: Columbia University (BA); Harvard University (PhD)

Academic work
- Discipline: American studies
- Institutions: Temple University

Miles Orvell is a professor of English and American studies at Temple University. He is the founding editor of the Encyclopedia of American Studies.

== Biography ==
Orvell received his B.A. from Columbia University and Ph.D. from Harvard University. He joined the faculty of Temple University in 1969.

Orvell has written on literary criticism and American cultural history with a specialization in visual culture. He has also written about the intersections between technology and culture as well as small-town life in America and its role in American culture and identity. From 2003 to 2011, he was the editor of the Encyclopedia of American Studies.

His book, The Real Thing, inspired British artist Holly Hendry's exhibition The Dump Is Full of Images at Yorkshire Sculpture Park in 2019.

== Bibliography ==
- Empire of Ruins: American Culture, Photography, and the Spectacle of Destruction (Oxford University Press, 2021)
- Photography in America (Oxford University Press, 2016)
- The Real Thing: Imitation and Authenticity in American Culture, 1880-1940. 25th Anniversary edition, 2014. (University of North Carolina Press)
- Rethinking the American City: An International Dialogue, co-edited with Klaus Benesch (University of Pennsylvania Press, 2013)
- The Death and Life of Main Street: Small Towns in American Memory, Space, and Community (University of North Carolina Press, 2012)
- John Vachon’s America, Photographs and Letters from the Depression to World War II (University of California Press, 2003)
- American Photography (Oxford History of Art Series, Oxford University Press, 2003)
- After the Machine: Visual Arts and the Erasing of Cultural Boundaries (University Press of Mississippi, 1995)
- Invisible Parade: The Fiction of Flannery O'Connor (Temple University Press, 1972). Reprinted, with a new preface, as Flannery O'Connor: An Introduction (University Press of Mississippi, Fall 1991)

== Awards ==
Orvell received the Bode-Pearson Prize from the American Studies Association for lifetime achievement in American studies.
