= Susan H. Brandt =

American historian

Susan Hanket Brandt is an American historian. The author of Woman Healers: Gender, Authority, and Medicine in Early Philadelphia (2022), she is a lecturer at University of Colorado, Colorado Springs.

== Biography ==
Susan Brandt received her undergraduate degree from Duke University, and then a Ph.D. from Temple University, in history. Her dissertation on women healers, Gifted Women and Skilled Practitioners: Gender and Healing Authority in the Delaware Valley, 1740–1830, won her the Lerner-Scott prize, awarded by the Organization of American Historians, in 2016.

Brandt's monograph Woman Healers: Gender, Authority, and Medicine in Early Philadelphia was published by the University of Pennsylvania Press in 2022. The book investigates the contributions by women healers to healthcare in the greater Philadelphia area; for centuries, European, Native American, and African American women provided healthcare, though their work has largely gone unnoticed.
