= Foundations of Modern Arab Identity =

Book by Stephen Sheehi

- Author: Stephen Sheehi
- Language: English
- Subject: Nadha
- Genre: Non-fiction
- Publisher: University Press of Florida
- Publication date: 2004
- Publication place: United States

Foundations of Modern Arab Identity (Gainesville, Florida: University Press of Florida, 2004) is a book-length study of the Nahda, or Arab Renaissance, by Arab American scholar Stephen Sheehi, which critically engages the intellectual struggles that ensued when Arab writers internalized Western ways of defining themselves and their societies in the mid-1800s.

== Summary ==
Jacques Lacan, Jacques Derrida, and Homi Bhabha were among the first to apply post-colonial, post-structural theory to a decolonial and Marxist re-examination of modern Arab culture and Arabic literature. Foundations of Modern Arab Identity discusses these applications from the perspective of Arab intellectuals of the 19th century including Butrus al-Bustani, Salim al-Bustani, Jurji Zaydan, Farah Antun, Ahmad Faris Shidyaq, Nasif al-Yaziji, Muhammad al-Muwaylihi, Muhammad Abduh and Jamal ad-din al-Afghani.

The book is a foundation for Nahda Studies, re-examining the intersection of European colonialism and the creation of Arab modernity. Re-framing the conception of modern Arab identity from a confrontation between two undifferentiated cultures, the book closely examines Arabic texts from turn of the century to demonstrate that the ideology and discourses of Arab subjectivity were internally shaped within the Ottoman Empire amid radical transformations in governance and political economy. Sheehi situates the battle to define "self" and "other" outside of the "colonial encounter" between Western and Eastern colonizers. Instead, the dialectic between Self and Other transpired internally—epistemologically and discursively—on a plane of dynamic cultural and social formations within Ottoman Arab society and polity during the Tanzimat. Sheehi proposes that the concept of cultural failure is inherent to the ways modern Arab intellectuals critically reorganize and redefine Arab subjectivity during modernity. Examining a host of varying sources including Arab fiction and commentary from the Arab press, Sheehi maps out a formula for Arab reform during the 19th and 20th century Nahda, which predicates progress and civilization as proleptic teleological endpoints. Linguistically and semitonically structuring this formula was an axiomatic nomenclature of reform that was found in all Arab reform writing and thought despite the ideological, sectarian, political, or national position of the author. Sheehi reveals this commonality is due to the historical and political fact that all reform paradigms during the late Ottoman and Mandate periods arose from a fundamental epistemology of Arab modernity; a hybridized but still thoroughly modern form of modernity that Sheehi states was autogenetic.

== Critical reception ==
Middle East scholar Orit Bashkin stated that "Sheehi’s work is an innovative and important contribution to the field of Arabic literature, Arab culture, and intellectual history" is noted for its "imaginative outlook on the ways in which we read the texts that make up the canon of the Arab nahda," otherwise known as the Arabic Renaissance. Bashkin added that "Sheehi's selection of texts is unique and original. Instead of focusing on either works in social thought or narrative prose, the book studies a variety of texts—pamphlets, newspaper articles, and philosophical tracts as well as maqamat, novels, and sketches—in an attempt to explicate new conversations and ideas, which were articulated in different genres and linguistic modes." Anthropologist Lucia Volk writes that Sheehi proves that these intellectual "elites actively produced indigenous ideologies of modernity while struggling against the overwhelming powers of Western colonialism."

== See also ==
- Stephen Sheehi
