= Shantrelle P. Lewis =

American curator, critic and filmmaker (born 1978)

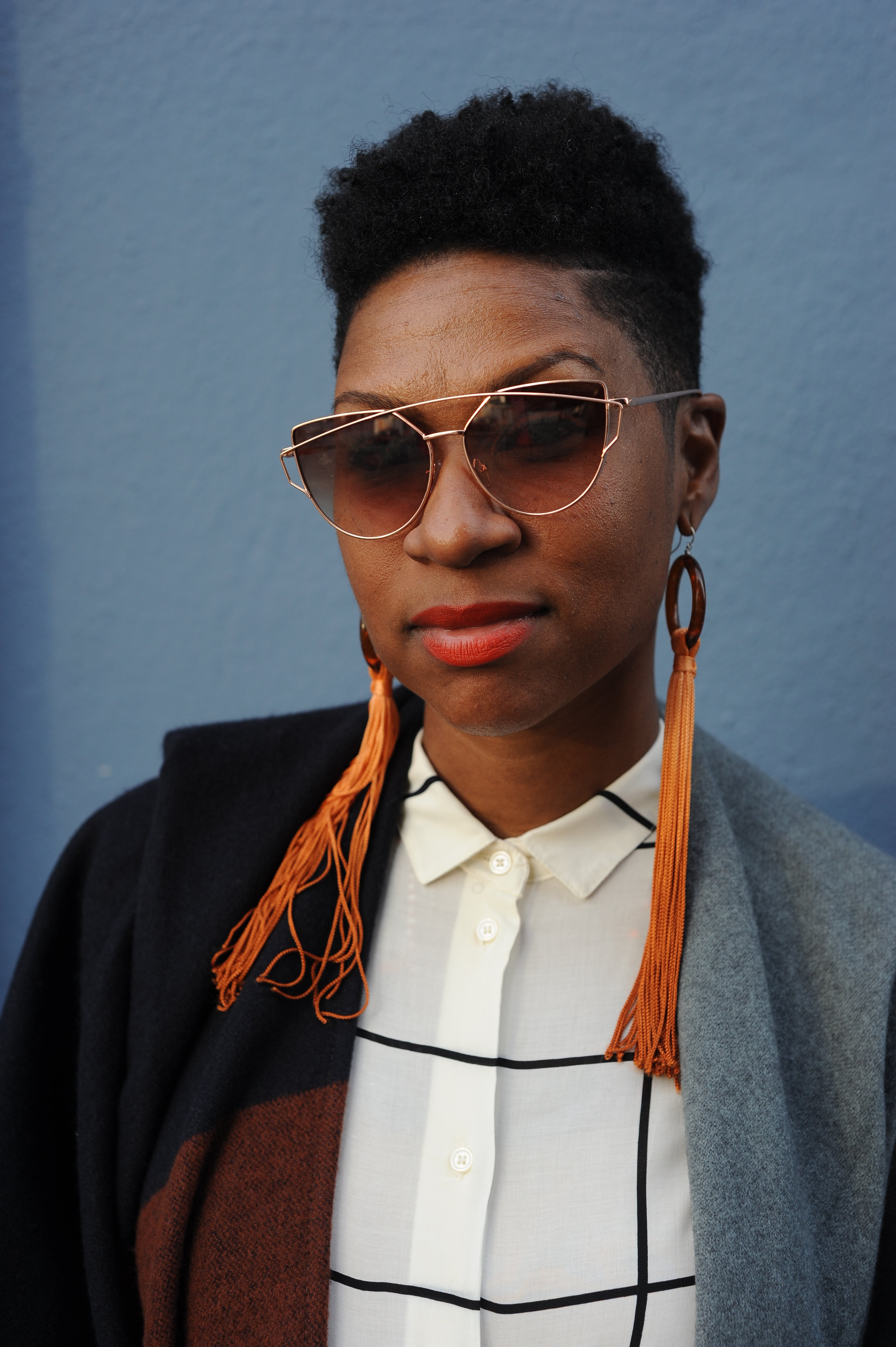
- Born: Shantrelle Patrice Lewis; June 13, 1978 (age 48); New Orleans, Louisiana U.S.
- Education: Howard University; Temple University
- Occupations: Curator; Africana Studies Scholar; Critic; Filmmaker; Social Entrepreneur
- Website: ShantrellePLewis.com

Shantrelle Patrice Lewis (born June 13, 1978) is an American curator, scholar, critic and filmmaker. She is a 2012 Andy Warhol Curatorial Fellow and a 2014 United Nations Programme for People of African Descent Fellow.

== Early life and education ==
Lewis was born in New Orleans, Louisiana, to computer analyst father Wayne Lewis and retired social worker mother Patricia Scott.

Lewis was introduced to African American history by her father through her own genealogy as a child where she learned she was a descendant of Henri Christophe, the first king of free Haiti in 1811. She comes from a family of teachers: Her paternal great grandfather, Nathan Lewis, was a student at Tuskegee University, and later taught at Southern University A&M and her paternal great grandmother, Della Atkinson, was a professor at Straight College, which is known today as Dillard University.

In 2000, Lewis received a bachelor's degree from Howard University in African American Studies. By then, her childhood experience with Black history grew into a career, teaching African-American Studies at Hyde Leadership Public Charter School in Washington, D.C. Lewis then earned a master's degree in African American Studies from Temple University in 2006. She returned to her hometown after the Hurricane Katrina disaster to help with revitalization and taught African World Studies at Dillard University.

== Career ==
After returning home to Louisiana in 2007, Lewis became Executive Director and Curator of the McKenna Museum of African American Art.

From 2009 to 2013, Lewis was the Director of Exhibitions and Programs at the Caribbean Cultural Center African Diaspora Institute (CCCADI) in New York City.

In 2010, Lewis began working on The Dandy Lion Project, curating images of black dandies that has taken the form of an international traveling exhibition, a film series and a book. The project connects the subversive contemporary fashion and lifestyle movement to historical images and has dated the movement that blends African aesthetics with European menswear back to the fifteenth century in Africa. Women dandies and trans men are also featured, further complicating the idea of black masculinity. Lewis focused on curating images authored by more than 30 photographers of the African Diaspora, thus reclaiming the authorship of images that in another context might have historically been seen as exploitive. This project has been exhibited at Museum of Contemporary Photography at Columbia College Chicago, Silver Eye Center for Photography in Pittsburgh, the Museum of the African Diaspora in San Francisco, the Brighton Photo Biennial, and Lowe Museum of Art in Miami.

Lewis gained attention as a cultural critic when Beyoncé's Formation video went public, critiquing its colorism, use of Bounce music, and the use of images from New Orleans that viscerally evoked the Hurricane Katrina storm where Lewis lost her grandmother and great-grandmother.

Lewis has also curated: SOS: Magic, Revelry, and Resistance in Post-Katrina New Orleans Art, Life After Death: A Multi-Media Analysis of the Persona that Was/Is Fela Anikulapo Kuti, Wearing Spirit: Aesthetically Personifying the Feminine in African Sacred Traditions, Sex Crimes Against Black Girls, and Black Pete, Zwarte Piet: The Documentary.

Lewis is also on the Board of Directors for the Black Star Film Festival and is the Chief Philadelphia Dream Director at The Future Project.

== Personal life ==
Lewis lives and works in Philadelphia, Pennsylvania.

Lewis's exhibition Sex Crimes Against Black Girls was partly inspired by her personal experience with abuse as a child.

In 2016, Lewis married business owner Tony Oluwatoyin Lawson with a wedding they called the "Royal Wedding of Zamunda" inspired by the blend of their Yoruba Nigerian, New Orleanian and Lucumi cultures with a nod to the film, Coming to America. The wedding included a traditional second line.

== Works and publications ==
- Lewis, Shantrelle (October 14, 2013). "American Apparel, Our Culture Is Not Your Trick, Nor Your Treat". Ebony.
- Lewis, Shantrelle P. (January 2014). "The Devil is a Liar: The Diasporic Trickster Tales of Jean-Michel Basquiat and Kendrick Lamar". Art Papers. Vol. 38, no. 1 (The Hip Hop Issue). p. 10.
- Lewis, Shantrelle P. (February 5, 2014). "Bow Ties and Rude Boys: The Rise of the Global Black Dandy". AfroPunk.
- Lewis, Shantrelle P. (January 5, 2016). "Fashioning Black Masculinity: The Origins of the Dandy Lion Project". Nka: Journal of Contemporary African Art. 2015 (37): 54–61. doi:10.1215/10757163-3339871. S2CID 194226067.
- Lewis, Shantrelle (February 10, 2016). ""Formation" Exploits New Orleans' Trauma". Slate.
- Wilson, Riley; Lewis, Shantrelle P. (February 2, 2016). "'The Birth of a Nation': The Biggest Clapback in Hollywood History or Yet Another Slave Movie?". ColorLines.
- Lewis, Shantrelle P. (2017). Dandy Lion The Black Dandy and Street Style. Aperture. ISBN 978-1-597-11389-2. OCLC 962550028.
