= Richard M. Englert =

American academic administrator

Richard M. Englert is an American academic administrator who recently served as the acting president of Temple University from September 2023 to November 2024.

Englert joined Temple University in 1976 as an assistant to the dean of the college of education. He served as the 11th president from 2016 to 2021 and as acting president in 2022 for six months. Additionally, he took over as president on September 26, 2023 after the passing of the previous president, JoAnne A. Epps, and was succeeded in November 2024 by John Anderson Fry.
