= Marvin Wachman =

Professor of American history (1917 – 2007)

Marvin Wachman (March 24, 1917 – December 22, 2007), a professor of American history, was president of Lincoln University and Temple University, and was interim president of Albright College and the Philadelphia College of Textiles and Science.

== Early life and education ==
Born in Milwaukee, Wisconsin, Wachman was the son of migrants from Riga (Latvia) and Minsk (now in Belarus). He attended Northwestern University in Chicago, where he earned bachelor's and master's degrees in history. He received his Ph.D. in history from the University of Illinois.

== University career ==
Wachman taught history for 14 years at Colgate University and was director of the Salzburg Seminar in Austria for two years. In 1961, he was asked to become president of Lincoln University, an historically black institution, which was having financial and accreditation problems. He hired new faculty, increased enrollment, and raised money to re-establish the university's academic standing. In 1969, he was appointed vice president for academic affairs at Temple University and, in 1973, became president. During his tenure, he founded new campuses in Tokyo, Japan and in the Center City of Philadelphia. He retired in 1983 and was president of the Foreign Policy Research Institute in Philadelphia from 1983 to 1989. During the 1990s, he was interim president of Albright College in Reading, Pennsylvania, and the Philadelphia College of Textiles and Science, now known as Jefferson University.

Wachman was the author of History of the Social-Democratic Party of Milwaukee, 1897-1910 (Urbana: University of Illinois Press, 1945). He published a memoir, The Education of a University President (Temple University Press), in 2005.
