= Millard E. Gladfelter =

American academic administrator (1900–1995)

Millard E. Gladfelter (January 16, 1900 – February 12, 1995) was Temple University's fourth president. Gladfelter was Temple's first president who had the background and training of an educator.

Gladfelter began as an educator as a fairly young man. He received his undergraduate education from Gettysburg College. He then was a high school history teacher and later principal in West York High School in Pennsylvania. His start on the faculty of Temple University was in 1930, when he was 30 years old. He started out as the director of the high school operated by Temple. He then became registrar. Later in 1941 he was made vice president. His title was expanded to provost in 1946.

Gladfelter had a master's degree in education from the University of Wisconsin, Madison. He later got his Ph.D. from the University of Pennsylvania. He served as provost of Temple University before becoming president of that institution.
