= Kessler Institute for Rehabilitation =

American hospital network

Coordinates: 40.78554°N 74.27936°W

- Company type: Division of Select Medical Corporation
- Industry: Healthcare
- Founded: 1948
- Founder: Henry H. Kessler, M.D.
- Headquarters: West Orange, New Jersey, United States
- Products: Specialty Healthcare Services
- Parent: Select Medical Corporation
- Website: kessler-rehab.com

Kessler Institute for Rehabilitation is a division of the Select Medical Corporation that provides physical medicine and rehabilitation programs and services. There are currently three inpatient rehabilitation facilities located throughout New Jersey. On June 1, 2010, Kessler Institute for Rehabilitation was awarded the Gallup Organization Great Workplace Award. The award is presented to the best performing workplaces in the world. Kessler Institute for Rehabilitation was one of only 25 recipients of the award. Kessler has also been ranked among the top one percent of rehabilitation hospitals by U.S. News & World Report.

== Mission statement ==
Kessler Institute for Rehabilitation has the following mission statement:

Kessler Institute for Rehabilitation, Inc. provides comprehensive physical medicine and rehabilitation programs and services to optimize the health, function and quality of life for those we serve. We enhance the delivery of care and advance the field of rehabilitation through education, research and advocacy. We do so in a clinically effective and fiscally responsible manner.

== Locations ==
=== West Orange campus ===
The West Orange campus, located in West Orange, New Jersey, currently operates 152 beds and specializes in the following:

- Severe disorders of consciousness
- Ventilator management
- Spinal cord injury
- Brain injury
- Stroke
- Amputation

=== Saddle Brook campus ===
The Saddle Brook campus, located in Saddle Brook, New Jersey, currently operates 112 beds and specializes in the following:

- Stroke
- Brain injury
- Amputation
- Neurological conditions, including multiple sclerosis, ALS, and Parkinson's disease
- Joint replacement
- Orthopedic trauma

=== Chester campus ===
The Chester campus, located in Chester, New Jersey, currently operates 72 beds and specializes in the following:

- Brain injury
- Stroke
- Neurological conditions
- Amputation
- Joint replacement
- Orthopedic trauma

== History ==
- 1948 - Kessler Institute for Rehabilitation founded in West Orange, New Jersey by Henry H. Kessler, M.D.
- 1949 - First patients admitted on January 3
- 1953 - New building housing large gymnasium, physical therapy department, and prosthetics shop dedicated
- 1956 - Kessler receives a $90,000 grant from the New Jersey State Rehabilitation Commission to establish a pre-vocational diagnostic unit, the first of its kind in the state
- 1959 - Groundbreaking ceremonies are held for a new 48-bed patient wing on the West Orange campus
- 1961 - New patient wing is dedicated and a swimming pool is constructed
- 1970 - Urology Services Department added to Kessler-West Orange
- 1973 - Groundbreaking is held for a new wing that will expand patient rooms, programs, and services
- 1974 - New wing that includes an additional 28 patient beds; outpatient gyms; speech, vocational, and social services areas; hydrotherapy center; and a new dining room and kitchen
- 1982 - Kessler purchases the New Jersey Rehabilitation Hospital in East Orange, New Jersey; the facility becomes known as Kessler Institute for Rehabilitation – East Orange campus
- 1986 - Kessler opens a 36-bed rehabilitation facility in space leased from the Saddle Brook/Kennedy Memorial Hospital in Saddle Brook, New Jersey
- 1989 - Kessler acquires the Welkind Rehabilitation Hospital in Chester, New Jersey, which becomes known as Kessler Institute for Rehabilitation – Chester campus
- 1990 - Kessler adds a three-story wing to its West Orange campus for physician offices, expanded urology and radiology services, and research and education areas
- 1993 - Kessler acquires the Saddle Brook/Kennedy Memorial Hospital in Saddle Brook, New Jersey; it becomes Kessler Institute for Rehabilitation – Saddle Brook campus
- 2003 - Kessler Rehabilitation Corporation is acquired by Select Medical Corporation
- 2005 - Groundbreaking ceremonies mark the beginning of construction on a new three-story addition to the Kessler West Orange campus
- 2007 - East Orange campus is closed; services and staff are transferred to the West Orange and Saddle Brook campuses
- 2008 - Kessler celebrates its 60th anniversary
