= List of colleges and universities in Pennsylvania =

The following is a list of colleges and universities in the U.S. state of Pennsylvania.

Pennsylvania is home to a number of universities, both public and private. The Pennsylvania State System of Higher Education (PASSHE) is the governing body that oversees appropriations for state owned higher education institutions. Established in 1983, there are currently ten four-year degree programs and a number of community colleges in the PASSHE system. Through the Commonwealth System of Higher Education, the state offers public appropriations to four quasi-private higher education institutions, although this support is more limited than what is received by PASSHE-affiliated institutions. Currently Lincoln University (HBCU), Pennsylvania State University, University of Pittsburgh, and Temple University are the four universities with Commonwealth affiliation. Commonwealth universities are often referred to as "state-related" for their quasi-public status.

== Public institutions ==
=== Four-year ===
Name	Location	County	Control	Classification	Enrollment (fall 2024)	Year founded
Cheyney University	Thornbury Township	Chester	PASSHE	Baccalaureate colleges: arts & sciences focus	617	1837
Commonwealth University-Bloomsburg	Bloomsburg	Columbia	PASSHE	Master's colleges & universities: larger programs	7,207	1839
Commonwealth University-Lock Haven	Lock Haven	Clinton	PASSHE	Master's colleges & universities: medium programs	2,524	1870
Commonwealth University-Mansfield	Mansfield	Tioga	PASSHE	Baccalaureate colleges: diverse fields	1,098	1857
East Stroudsburg University	East Stroudsburg	Monroe	PASSHE	Master's colleges & universities: larger programs	5,633	1893
Indiana University of Pennsylvania	Indiana borough	Indiana	PASSHE	Doctoral universities: high research activity	9,073	1875
Kutztown University	Maxatawny Township	Berks	PASSHE	Master's colleges & universities: larger programs	7,467	1866
Lincoln University	Lower Oxford Township	Chester	Commonwealth System of Higher Education	Master's colleges & universities: larger programs	1,670	1854
Millersville University	Millersville	Lancaster	PASSHE	Master's colleges & universities: larger programs	6,975	1855
Pennsylvania State University	State College	Centre	Commonwealth System of Higher Education	Doctoral universities: R1: very high research activity	50,737	1855
Penn State Abington	Abington Township	Montgomery	Pennsylvania State University Commonwealth Campuses	Baccalaureate university	2,885	1850
Penn State Altoona	Altoona	Blair	Pennsylvania State University Commonwealth Campuses	Baccalaureate university	2,371	1939
Penn State Beaver	Center Township	Beaver	Pennsylvania State University Commonwealth Campuses	Baccalaureate university (with a single Master's program available)	482	1965
Penn State Berks	Spring Township	Berks	Pennsylvania State University Commonwealth Campuses	Baccalaureate university	1,884	1958
Penn State Brandywine	Middletown Township	Delaware	Pennsylvania State University Commonwealth Campuses	Baccalaureate university	1,236	1967
Penn State DuBois	DuBois city	Clearfield	Pennsylvania State University Commonwealth Campuses	Baccalaureate university	350	1935
Penn State Erie, The Behrend College	Harborcreek Township	Erie	Pennsylvania State University Commonwealth Campuses	Master's university	3,336	1948
Penn State Fayette, The Eberly Campus	North Union Township	Fayette	Pennsylvania State University Commonwealth Campuses	Associate's college (with five bachelor's degrees available)	405	1965
Penn State Great Valley School of Graduate Professional Studies	East Whiteland Township	Chester	Pennsylvania State University Commonwealth Campuses	Graduate school	212	1963
Penn State Greater Allegheny	White Oak	Allegheny	Pennsylvania State University Commonwealth Campuses	Baccalaureate university	352	1952
Penn State Harrisburg	Lower Swatara Township	Dauphin	Pennsylvania State University Commonwealth Campuses	Doctoral university	4,478	1966
Penn State Hazleton	Sugarloaf Township	Luzerne	Pennsylvania State University Commonwealth Campuses	Baccalaureate university	502	1934
Penn State Lehigh Valley	Upper Saucon Township	Lehigh	Pennsylvania State University Commonwealth Campuses	Baccalaureate university	867	1912
Penn State Mont Alto	Mont Alto	Franklin	Pennsylvania State University Commonwealth Campuses	Baccalaureate university	582	1903
Penn State New Kensington	New Kensington	Westmoreland	Pennsylvania State University Commonwealth Campuses	Baccalaureate university (with a single Master's program available)	421	1958
Penn State Schuylkill	North Manheim Township	Schuylkill	Pennsylvania State University Commonwealth Campuses	Baccalaureate university	624	1934
Penn State Scranton	Dunmore borough	Lackawanna	Pennsylvania State University Commonwealth Campuses	Baccalaureate university	800	1923
Penn State Shenango	Sharon	Mercer	Pennsylvania State University Commonwealth Campuses	Baccalaureate university	265	1965
Penn State Wilkes-Barre	Dallas	Luzerne	Pennsylvania State University Commonwealth Campuses	Baccalaureate university	315	1916
Penn State World Campus	State College	Centre	Commonwealth System of Higher Education	Online university	13,774	1998
Penn State York	York	York	Pennsylvania State University Commonwealth Campuses	Baccalaureate university	677	1939
Pennsylvania College of Technology	Williamsport	Lycoming	Pennsylvania State University Commonwealth campuses	Baccalaureate/Associate's colleges: Mixed Baccalaureate/Associate's	4,575	1914
PennWest California	California	Washington	PASSHE	Master's colleges & universities: larger programs	2,493	1852
PennWest Clarion	Clarion	Clarion	PASSHE	Master's colleges & universities: larger programs	1,547	1867
PennWest Edinboro	Edinboro	Erie	PASSHE	Master's colleges & universities: larger programs	2,060	1857
Shippensburg University	Shippensburg Township	Cumberland	PASSHE	Master's colleges & universities: larger programs	5,161	1871
Slippery Rock University	Slippery Rock	Butler	PASSHE	Master's colleges & universities: larger programs	8,376	1889
Temple University	Philadelphia and Upper Dublin Township	Philadelphia and Montgomery	Commonwealth System of Higher Education	Doctoral universities: R1: very high research activity	29,640	1884
University of Pittsburgh	Pittsburgh	Allegheny	Commonwealth System of Higher Education	Doctoral universities: R1: very high research activity	35,724	1787
University of Pittsburgh at Bradford	Bradford Township	McKean	Commonwealth System of Higher Education	Baccalaureate colleges: diverse fields	1,009	1963
University of Pittsburgh at Greensburg	Hempfield Township	Westmoreland	Commonwealth System of Higher Education	Baccalaureate colleges: arts & sciences focus	1,321	1963
University of Pittsburgh at Johnstown	Richland Township	Cambria	Commonwealth System of Higher Education	Baccalaureate colleges: diverse fields	1,813	1927
West Chester University	West Chester, Philadelphia	Chester, Philadelphia	PASSHE	Doctoral universities: high research activity	17,171	1871

=== Two-year ===
Name	Location	County	Control	Classification	Enrollment (fall 2024)	Year founded
Bucks County Community College	Newtown Township, Bristol Township, East Rockhill Township	Bucks	public	Associate's Colleges: High Transfer-Mixed Traditional/Nontraditional	6,232	1964
Butler County Community College	Butler Township	Butler	public	Associate's Colleges: Mixed Transfer/Career & Technical-High Traditional	2,317	1965
Community College of Allegheny County	Pittsburgh city, Monroeville, McCandless Township, West Mifflin	Allegheny	public	Associate's Colleges: High Career & Technical-Mixed Traditional/Nontraditional	10,609	1966
Community College of Beaver County	Center Township	Beaver	public	Associate's Colleges: High Career & Technical-High Traditional	1,936	1966
Community College of Philadelphia	Philadelphia	Philadelphia	public	Associate's Colleges: High Transfer-High Traditional	12,926	1965
Delaware County Community College	Marple Township & East Brandywine Township	Delaware	public	Associate's Colleges: Mixed Transfer/Career & Technical-High Traditional	7,402	1967
Harrisburg Area Community College	Harrisburg city, East Lampeter Township, Manchester Township, Cumberland Township, Lebanon city	Dauphin	public	Associate's Colleges: High Career & Technical-Mixed Traditional/Nontraditional	12,585	1964
Lehigh Carbon Community College	North Whitehall Township, Allentown city, Tamaqua, Hanover Township	Lehigh	public	Associate's Colleges: Mixed Transfer/Career & Technical-Mixed Traditional/Nontraditional	6,221	1966
Luzerne County Community College	Nanticoke, Berwick, Hazleton, Pittston city, Scranton city, Shamokin city, Watsontown borough, Wilkes-Barre city	Luzerne	public	Associate's Colleges: High Career & Technical-Mixed Traditional/Nontraditional	4,460	1967
Montgomery County Community College	Whitpain Township, Pottstown borough	Montgomery	public	Associate's Colleges: Mixed Transfer/Career & Technical-Mixed Traditional/Nontraditional	9,278	1964
Northampton County Area Community College	Bethlehem Township, Pocono Township	Northampton, Monroe	public	Associate's Colleges: Mixed Transfer/Career & Technical-High Traditional	8,810	1967
Pennsylvania Highlands Community College	Richland Township	Cambria	public	Associate's Colleges: Mixed Transfer/Career & Technical-High Nontraditional	2,501	1993
Reading Area Community College	Reading city	Berks	public	Associate's Colleges: Mixed Transfer/Career & Technical-Mixed Traditional/Nontraditional	5,369	1971
Thaddeus Stevens College of Technology	Lancaster city	Lancaster	public	Associate's Colleges: High Career & Technical-High Traditional	1,470	1905
University of Pittsburgh at Titusville educational and training hub	Titusville city	Crawford	University of Pittsburgh campus	Associate's Colleges: High Career & Technical-High Traditional	36	1963
Westmoreland County Community College	Hempfield Township	Westmoreland	public	Associate's Colleges: High Career & Technical-High Nontraditional	3,990	1970

== Private institutions ==
Name	Location	County	Control	Classification	Enrollment (fall 2024)	Year founded
Albright College	Reading city	Berks	United Methodist Church	Baccalaureate Colleges: Arts & Sciences Focus	1,380	1856
Allegheny College	Meadville	Crawford	United Methodist Church	Baccalaureate Colleges: Arts & Sciences Focus	1,171	1815
Alvernia University	Reading	Berks	Catholic Church (Franciscans)	Doctoral/Professional Universities	2,796	1958
Arcadia University	Cheltenham Township	Montgomery	Presbyterian Church (USA)	Master's Colleges & Universities: Larger Programs	3,404	1853
Bryn Athyn College	Bryn Athyn borough	Montgomery	General Church of the New Jerusalem	Baccalaureate Colleges: Arts & Sciences Focus	255	1877
Bryn Mawr College	Lower Merion Township	Montgomery	private secular	Baccalaureate Colleges: Arts & Sciences Focus	1,679	1885
Bucknell University	East Buffalo township	Union	private secular	Baccalaureate Colleges: Arts & Sciences Focus	3,969	1846
Cairn University	Langhorne Manor borough	Bucks	Nondenominational Christianity	Master's Colleges & Universities: Medium Programs	1,097	1913
Carlow University	Pittsburgh city	Allegheny	Catholic Church (Sisters of Mercy)	Master's Colleges & Universities: Larger Programs	2,416	1929
Carnegie Mellon University	Pittsburgh city	Allegheny	private secular	Doctoral Universities: Very High Research Activity	15,888	1900
Cedar Crest College	Allentown city	Lehigh	private secular	Master's Colleges & Universities: Small Programs	1,290	1867
Central Penn College	East Pennsboro township	Cumberland	private secular	Baccalaureate Colleges: Diverse Fields	684	1881
Chatham University	Pittsburgh city	Allegheny	private secular	Doctoral/Professional Universities	2,309	1869
Chestnut Hill College	Philadelphia	Philadelphia	Catholic Church (Sisters of Saint Joseph)	Master's Colleges & Universities: Medium Programs	1,288	1924
Delaware Valley University	Doylestown township	Bucks	private secular	Master's Colleges & Universities: Small Programs	2,199	1896
DeSales University	Upper Saucon Township	Lehigh	Catholic Church (Oblates of Saint Francis de Sales)	Doctoral/Professional Universities	2,972	1964
Dickinson College	Carlisle borough	Cumberland	private secular	Baccalaureate Colleges: Arts & Sciences Focus	2,314	1773
Drexel University	Philadelphia	Philadelphia	private secular	Doctoral Universities: Very High Research Activity	21,153	1891
Duquesne University	Pittsburgh city	Allegheny	Catholic Church (Congregation of the Holy Spirit)	Doctoral Universities: High Research Activity	8,234	1878
Eastern University	Radnor township	Delaware	American Baptist Churches USA	Master's Colleges & Universities: Larger Programs	8,727	1925
Elizabethtown College	Elizabethtown borough	Lancaster	Church of the Brethren	Master's Colleges & Universities: Small Programs	2,283	1899
Franklin and Marshall College	Lancaster city	Lancaster	private secular	Baccalaureate Colleges: Arts & Sciences Focus	1,808	1787
Gannon University	Erie city	Erie	Catholic Church	Doctoral/Professional Universities	4,189	1925
Geneva College	Beaver Falls city	Beaver	Reformed Presbyterian Church of North America	Master's Colleges & Universities: Small Programs	1,366	1848
Gettysburg College	Gettysburg borough	Adams	Evangelical Lutheran Church in America	Baccalaureate Colleges: Arts & Sciences Focus	2,812	1832
Gratz College	Melrose Park	Montgomery	Jewish (nondenominational)	Master's Colleges & Universities: Small Programs	449	1895
Grove City College	Grove City borough	Mercer	Presbyterian Church (USA)	Baccalaureate Colleges: Diverse Fields	2,383	1876
Gwynedd Mercy University	Lower Gwynedd township	Montgomery	Catholic Church	Doctoral/Professional Universities	2,017	1948
Harcum College	Lower Merion township	Montgomery	private secular	Associate's Colleges: High Career & Technical-High Traditional	908	1915
Harrisburg University of Science and Technology	Harrisburg city	Dauphin	private secular	Master's Colleges & Universities: Larger Programs	3,650	2001
Haverford College	Haverford township	Delaware	private secular	Baccalaureate Colleges: Arts & Sciences Focus	1,431	1833
Holy Family University	Philadelphia, Newtown township	Philadelphia, Bucks	Catholic Church (Sisters of the Holy Family of Nazareth)	Master's Colleges & Universities: Larger Programs	3,225	1954
Immaculata University	East Whiteland township	Chester	Catholic Church (Sisters, Servants of the Immaculate Heart of Mary)	Doctoral/Professional Universities	2,512	1920
Juniata College	Huntingdon borough	Huntingdon	Church of the Brethren	Baccalaureate Colleges: Arts & Sciences Focus	1,321	1876
Keystone College	La Plume township	Lackawanna	private secular	Baccalaureate Colleges: Diverse Fields	952	1868
King's College	Wilkes-Barre city	Luzerne	Catholic Church (Congregation of Holy Cross)	Master's Colleges & Universities: Medium Programs	1,939	1946
La Roche University	McCandless township	Allegheny	Catholic Church (Congregation of Divine Providence)	Master's Colleges & Universities: Small Programs	2,153	1963
La Salle University	Philadelphia	Philadelphia	Catholic Church (De La Salle Brothers)	Doctoral/Professional Universities	3,153	1863
Lackawanna College	Scranton city, Hazleton city, New Milford township, Towanda township, Hawley borough, Sunbury city, Covington township	Lackawanna, Luzerne, Susquehanna, Bradford, Wayne, Northumberland	private secular	Comprehensive Associate's College, offers bachelor's degrees in certain majors	2,211	1894
Lafayette College	Easton city	Northampton	Presbyterian Church (USA)	Baccalaureate Colleges: Arts & Sciences, Engineering Focus	2,775	1826
Lancaster Bible College	Manheim township	Lancaster	Nondenominational Christianity	Master's Colleges & Universities: Small Programs	2,519	1933
Lebanon Valley College	Annville township	Lebanon	United Methodist Church	Master's Colleges & Universities: Small Programs	2,146	1866
Lehigh University	Bethlehem city	Northampton	private secular	Doctoral Universities: High Research Activity	7,692	1865
Lycoming College	Williamsport city	Lycoming	United Methodist Church	Baccalaureate Colleges: Arts & Sciences Focus	1,012	1812
Manor College	Abington township	Montgomery	Catholic Church (Order of Saint Basil the Great)	Baccalaureate/Associate's Colleges: Associate's Dominant	567	1947
Marywood University	Dunmore borough	Lackawanna	Catholic Church (Sisters, Servants of the Immaculate Heart of Mary)	Master's Colleges & Universities: Larger Programs	2,530	1915
Mercyhurst University	Erie city	Erie	Catholic Church (Sisters of Mercy)	Master's Colleges & Universities: Medium Programs	2,632	1926
Messiah University	Upper Allen township	Cumberland	Christianity (Interdenominationalism)	Master's Colleges & Universities: Larger Programs	3,373	1909
Misericordia University	Dallas township	Luzerne	Catholic Church (Sisters of Mercy)	Doctoral/Professional Universities	2,200	1924
Moravian University	Bethlehem city	Northampton	Moravian Church in North America	Master's Colleges & Universities: Small Programs	2,745	1742
Mount Aloysius College	Cresson township	Cambria	Catholic Church (Sisters of Mercy)	Baccalaureate Colleges: Diverse Fields	2,955	1853
Muhlenberg College	Allentown city	Lehigh	Evangelical Lutheran Church in America	Baccalaureate Colleges: Arts & Sciences Focus	1,788	1848
Neumann University	Aston township	Delaware	Catholic Church (Third Order of Saint Francis)	Master's Colleges & Universities: Medium Programs	2,244	1965
Point Park University	Pittsburgh city	Allegheny	private secular	Doctoral/Professional Universities	3,448	1960
Robert Morris University	Moon township	Allegheny	private secular	Doctoral/Professional Universities	5,275	1921
Rosemont College	Lower Merion township	Montgomery	Catholic Church (Society of the Holy Child Jesus)	Master's Colleges & Universities: Medium Programs	781	1921
Saint Francis University	Loretto borough	Cambria	Catholic Church	Master's Colleges & Universities: Larger Programs	2,963	1847
Saint Joseph's University	Philadelphia and Lancaster	Philadelphia	Catholic Church (Society of Jesus)	Master's Colleges & Universities: Larger Programs	8,598	1851
Saint Vincent College	Latrobe	Westmoreland	Catholic Church (Benedictines)	Baccalaureate Colleges: Arts & Sciences Focus	1,440	1846
Seton Hill University	Greensburg city	Westmoreland	Catholic Church (Sisters of Charity of Seton Hill)	Master's Colleges & Universities: Medium Programs	1,927	1885
Susquehanna University	Selinsgrove borough	Snyder	Evangelical Lutheran Church in America	Baccalaureate Colleges: Arts & Sciences Focus	2,255	1858
Swarthmore College	Swarthmore borough	Delaware	private secular	Baccalaureate Colleges: Arts & Sciences Focus	1,623	1864
Thiel College	Greenville borough	Mercer	Evangelical Lutheran Church in America	Baccalaureate Colleges: Diverse Fields	950	1866
Thomas Jefferson University	Philadelphia	Philadelphia	private secular	Doctoral Universities: High Research Activity	8,238	1824
University of Pennsylvania	Philadelphia	Philadelphia	private secular	Doctoral Universities: Very High Research Activity	29,109	1755
University of Scranton	Scranton city	Lackawanna	Catholic Church (Society of Jesus)	Master's Colleges & Universities: Larger Programs	4,724	1888
Ursinus College	Collegeville borough	Montgomery	private secular	Baccalaureate Colleges: Arts & Sciences Focus	1,502	1869
Villanova University	Radnor township	Delaware	Catholic Church (Order of Saint Augustine)	Doctoral Universities: High Research Activity	10,041	1842
Washington & Jefferson College	Washington city	Washington	private secular	Baccalaureate Colleges: Arts & Sciences Focus	1,309	1781
Waynesburg University	Waynesburg borough	Greene	Presbyterian Church (USA)	Master's Colleges & Universities: Medium Programs	1,231	1850
Westminster College	New Wilmington borough	Lawrence	Presbyterian Church (USA)	Baccalaureate Colleges: Arts & Sciences Focus	1,191	1852
Widener University	Chester city	Delaware	private secular	Doctoral/Professional Universities	5,713	1821
Wilkes University	Wilkes-Barre city	Luzerne	private secular	Doctoral/Professional Universities	5,381	1933
Wilson College	Chambersburg borough	Franklin	Presbyterian Church (USA)	Master's Colleges & Universities: Medium Programs	1,907	1869
York College of Pennsylvania	Spring Garden township	York	private secular	Master's Colleges & Universities: Small Programs	3,825	1787

=== Special focus institutions ===
Name	Location	County	Control	Classification	Enrollment (fall 2024)	Year founded
Academy of Vocal Arts	Philadelphia	Philadelphia	private secular	unclassified	~ 30	1933
All-State Career School	Tinicum township and West Mifflin borough	Delaware and Allegheny	private for profit	Special Focus Two-Year: Career schools	1,296	1967
The American College of Financial Services	Upper Merion township	Montgomery	private secular	Special Focus Four-Year: Business & Management schools	5,514	1927
ASPIRA City College	Philadelphia	Philadelphia	private secular	unclassified	26	1974
Berks Technical Institute	Allentown, Lewisburg, Wyomissing	Berks, Lehigh, Union	private for profit	Special Focus Two-Year: Technical Professions	967	1982
Byzantine Catholic Seminary of Saints Cyril and Methodius	Pittsburgh city	Allegheny	Catholic Church (Byzantine Catholic Metropolitan Church of Pittsburgh)	Special Focus Four-Year: Faith-Related institutions	24	1950
Central Pennsylvania Institute of Science and Technology	Spring township	Centre	public	Special Focus Two-Year: Technical Professions	171	1969
Commonwealth Technical Institute	Upper Yoder township	Cambria	Pennsylvania Department of Labor and Industry	Associate's Colleges: High Career & Technical-Mixed Traditional and Nontraditional	146	2000
Curtis Institute of Music	Philadelphia	Philadelphia	private secular	Special Focus Four-Year: Arts, Music & Design Schools	161	1924
Douglas Education Center	Monessen city	Westmoreland	private for profit	Special Focus Two-Year: Arts & Design	178	1904
Erie Institute of Technology	Millcreek Township	Erie	private for profit	Special Focus Two-Year: Technical Professions	221	1958
Fortis College	Forty Fort and Scranton	Luzerne and Lackawanna	private for profit	Special Focus Two-Year: Health Professions	387	2008
Geisinger Commonwealth School of Medicine	Scranton city	Lackawanna	private secular (Geisinger Health System)	Special Focus Four-Year: Medical schools and centers	665	2008
Great Lakes Institute of Technology	Millcreek Township	Erie	private for profit	Special Focus Two-Year: Health Professions	335	1965
Institute of Medical Careers	Penn Hills	Allegheny	private for profit	Special Focus Two-Year: Health Professions	845	1995
International Institute for Restorative Practices	Bethlehem city	Northampton	private secular	Special Focus Four-Year: Other Special Focus institutions	110	2000
JNA Institute of Culinary Arts	Philadelphia	Philadelphia	private for profit	Special Focus Two-Year: Arts & Design	15	1988
Johnson College	Scranton city	Lackawanna	private secular	Industrial-Oriented Technical School	678	1912
Lake Erie College of Osteopathic Medicine	Erie city	Erie	private secular	Special Focus Four-Year: Medical schools and centers	4,133	1992
Lancaster County Career and Technology Center	West Lampeter township	Lancaster	public	Special Focus Two-Year: Other Fields	279	1971
Lancaster Theological Seminary	Lancaster city	Lancaster	United Church of Christ	Special Focus Four-Year: Faith-Related institutions	66	1825
Lansdale School of Business	Upper Gwynedd township	Montgomery	private for profit	Associate's Colleges: High Career & Technical-High Traditional	93	1918
Laurel Technical Institute	Uniontown, Hermitage, Export	Fayette, Mercer, Westmoreland	private for profit	Associate's Colleges: High Career & Technical-High Traditional	683	1985
Lincoln Tech	Upper Macungie Township, Philadelphia	Lehigh, Philadelphia	private for profit	Associate's Colleges: High Career & Technical-High Traditional	973	1947
Missio Seminary	Philadelphia	Philadelphia	Christianity (Interdenominationalism)	Special Focus Four-Year: Faith-Related institutions	20	1971
Moore College of Art and Design	Philadelphia city	Philadelphia	private secular	Special Focus Four-Year: Arts, Music & Design Schools	549	1848
New Castle School of Trades	Union township	Lawrence	private for profit	Associate's Colleges: High Career & Technical-High Traditional	700	1945
Northern Pennsylvania Regional College	Warren city	Warren	private secular but state supported	Associate's Colleges: High Transfer-High Nontraditional	136	2020
Orleans Technical College	Philadelphia	Philadelphia	private for profit	unclassified	340	1974
Penn Commercial Business and Technical School	South Strabane township	Washington	private for profit	Associate's Colleges: High Career & Technical-High Nontraditional	265	1929
Pennsylvania College of Art and Design	Lancaster city	Lancaster	private secular	Special Focus Four-Year: Arts, Music & Design schools	414	1982
Pennsylvania Institute of Technology	Upper Providence township	Delaware	private secular	Special Focus Two-Year: Health Professions	810	1953
Philadelphia College of Osteopathic Medicine	Philadelphia	Philadelphia	private secular	Special Focus Four-Year: Medical schools and centers	2,901	1899
PITC Institute	Wyncote	Montgomery	private for profit	Special Focus Two-Year: Health Professions	282	1998
Pittsburgh Institute of Aeronautics	West Mifflin borough	Allegheny	private secular	Special Focus Two-Year: Technical Professions	663	1929
Pittsburgh Institute of Mortuary Science	Pittsburgh city	Allegheny	private secular	Special Focus Two-Year: Arts & Design	374	1939
Pittsburgh Theological Seminary	Pittsburgh city	Allegheny	Presbyterian Church (USA)	Special Focus Four-Year: Faith-Related institutions	202	1794
Reconstructionist Rabbinical College	Cheltenham township	Montgomery	Jewish (Reconstructionist Judaism)	Special Focus Four-Year: Faith-Related institutions	46	1968
Rosedale Technical College	Pittsburgh city	Allegheny	private secular	Special Focus Two-Year: Technical Professions	475	1947
Saint Charles Borromeo Seminary	Radnor township	Delaware	Catholic Church (Roman Catholic Archdiocese of Philadelphia)	Special Focus Four-Year: Faith-Related institutions	170	1832
Saint Vincent Seminary	Latrobe	Westmoreland	Catholic Church (Benedictines)	Special Focus Four-Year: Faith-Related institutions	79	1846
South Hills School of Business and Technology	State College borough and Altoona city	Centre and Blair	private for profit	Associate's Colleges: High Transfer-High Traditional	260	1970
Strayer University	Philadelphia	Philadelphia	private for profit	Satellite campus	1,384	1892
Talmudical Yeshiva of Philadelphia	Philadelphia	Philadelphia	Jewish (Haredi Judaism)	Special Focus Four-Year: Faith-Related institutions	112	1953
Theological Seminary of the Reformed Episcopal Church	Blue Bell	Montgomery	Reformed Episcopal Church	Special Focus Four-Year: Faith-Related institutions	12	1887
Trinity School for Ministry	Ambridge borough	Beaver	Anglicanism	Special Focus Four-Year: Faith-Related institutions	169	1975
United Lutheran Seminary	Gettysburg borough	Adams	Evangelical Lutheran Church in America	Special Focus Four-Year: Faith-Related institutions	254	1864
Valley Forge Military College	Radnor township	Delaware	private secular	Associate's Colleges: High Transfer-High Traditional	97	1928
Vet Tech Institute	Pittsburgh city	Allegheny	private for profit	Special Focus Two-Year: Health Professions	183	unknown
Westminster Theological Seminary	Cheltenham township	Montgomery	Calvinism or Presbyterianism (unaffiliated)	Special Focus Four-Year: Faith-Related institutions	1,183	1929
Williamson College of the Trades	Middletown township	Delaware	private secular	Associate's Colleges: High Career & Technical-High Traditional	322	1888
Won Institute of Graduate Studies	Cheltenham township	Montgomery	Buddhist (Won Buddhism)	Special Focus Four-Year: Other Health Professions schools	118	2001
Yeshivath Bais Moshe	Scranton city	Lackawanna	Jewish (Orthodox Judaism)	Special Focus Four-Year: Faith-Related institutions	34	1965
YTI Career Institute	Logan township and Springettsbury township	Blair and York	private for profit	Special Focus Two-Year: Health Professions	674	1967

== Defunct institutions ==
Includes all not-for-profit schools that have closed since 1960.

Name	Location	School type	Year founded	Year closed	Notes
Allegheny University of the Health Sciences	Philadelphia	Private, medical school	1993	2002	formed via a merger of Hahnemann Medical College and The Medical College of Pennsylvania; now a part of Drexel University College of Medicine
Alliance College	Cambridge Springs	Private, baccalaureate university	1948	1987	
Antonelli College	Springfield township	private for profit	1947	2019	
Bradford School	Pittsburgh city	private for profit	1968	2018	
Brightwood College	Broomall and various other campuses	private for profit	1937	2018	
Cabrini University	Radnor township	Catholic Church (Missionary Sisters of the Sacred Heart of Jesus), Master's Colleges & Universities: Medium Programs	1957	2024	
Calvary Baptist Theological Seminary	Upper Gwynedd township	Baptist unaffiliated	1976	2014	
Cambria-Rowe Business College	Johnstown	private for profit	1891	2016	
Career Training Academy	Lower Burrell	private for profit	unknown	2019	
Clarks Summit University	South Abington township	Independent Baptist, Master's Colleges & Universities: Small Programs	1932	2024	
Combs College of Music	Philadelphia	Private, master's music school	1885	1990	
Consolidated School of Business	East Hempfield township	private for profit	1986	2017	
Crozer Theological Seminary	Upland	Private, Baptist seminary	1857	1970	
Delaware Valley Academy of Medical and Dental Assistants	Philadelphia	private for profit	1966	2011	
Dropsie College for Hebrew and Cognate Learning	Philadelphia	Private, graduate school of Jewish studies	1907	1986	merged with the University of Pennsylvania to become the Center for Advanced Judaic Studies
Hahnemann Medical College	Philadelphia	Medical college	1848	1993	merged with The Medical College of Pennsylvania; now a part of Drexel University College of Medicine
Hershey Junior College	Derry Township	Associate's college	1938	1965	
Hussian College	Philadelphia	private secular, Associate's Art & Design School	1946	2023	
Keystone Technical Institute	Lower Paxton township	Private, for profit technical school	1980	2017	
Mary Immaculate Seminary	Lehigh Township	Private, Roman Catholic seminary	1939	1990	
Medical College of Pennsylvania	Philadelphia	Medical school	1850	1993	merged with Hahnemann Medical College; now a part of Drexel University College of Medicine
Mercyhurst North East	North East township	Catholic Church	1991	2021	
Northeastern Christian Junior College	Lower Merion Township	Private, Bible college affiliated with the Churches of Christ	1957	1993	
Peirce College	Philadelphia	Private secular baccalaureate college with diverse fields	1865	2026	acquired by Lackawanna College
Penn Hall Junior College	Chambersburg	Associate's college	1906	1973	
Pennsylvania Academy of the Fine Arts	Philadelphia	private secular, Special Focus Four-Year: Arts, Music & Design schools	1805	2025	ended degree programs following 2024-25 academic year
Pennsylvania College of Health Sciences	East Lampeter township	private secular, Special Focus Four-Year: Other Health Professions Schools	1903	2024	acquired by Saint Joseph's University
Pennsylvania College of Podiatric Medicine	Philadelphia	Medical school	1963	1998	merged with Temple University to become the Temple University School of Podiatric Medicine
Philadelphia University	Philadelphia	Private university	1884	2017	merged with Thomas Jefferson University
Pinebrook Junior College	Coopersburg	Private, nondenominational Bible college	1914	1992	
Pittsburgh Technical College	Pittsburgh city	private secular, Baccalaureate/Associate's Colleges: Associate's Dominant	1946	2024	
Precision Manufacturing Institute	Meadville city	private for profit	1987	2022	
Saint Fidelis Seminary	Summit Township	Private, baccalaureate Roman Catholic university	1877	1979	
Saint Pius X Seminary	Dalton	Private, Roman Catholic seminary	1967	2004	
Salus University	Cheltenham township	private secular, Special Focus Four-Year: Other Health Professions Schools	1919	2022	
Schuylkill Institute of Business and Technology	Pottsville city	private for profit	1998	2007	
Spring Garden College	Philadelphia	Private, baccalaureate university	1851	1992	
Star Technical Institute	Philadelphia	private for profit			
Triangle Tech	multiple	private, for-profit technical school	1944	2025	
United Wesleyan College	Allentown	Bible college affiliated with the Wesleyan Church	1921	1990	
University of the Arts	Philadelphia	private secular, Special Focus Four-Year: Arts, Music & Design Schools	1870	2024	
University of the Sciences	Philadelphia	private secular, Doctoral/Professional University	1821	2022	merged into Saint Joseph's University
University of Valley Forge	Schuylkill township	Baccalaureate Colleges: Diverse Fields, Assemblies of God USA	1939	2026	
Villa Marie College	Erie	baccalaureate Roman Catholic university	1925	1989	merged with Gannon University

== See also ==
- Higher education in the United States
- List of American institutions of higher education
- List of colleges and universities
- List of college athletic programs in Pennsylvania
- List of colleges and universities in Philadelphia
- List of colleges and universities in Pittsburgh
- List of for-profit colleges and universities in Pennsylvania
- Association of Independent Colleges and Universities of Pennsylvania (AICUP)
