= List of for-profit colleges and universities in Pennsylvania =

The following is a list of for-profit colleges and universities in Pennsylvania. Only schools with a physical campus within the state are listed. For public and private, not-for-profit schools, see List of colleges and universities in Pennsylvania.

Name	Campus Locations	School type
Altierus Career College	Bensalem Township, Bucks County (Bensalem Campus); Pittsburgh (Pittsburgh Campus)	Associate's Health & Business School
Antonelli College	Springfield Township, Montgomery County	Associate's Art & Design School
Berks Technical Institute	Wyomissing	Associate's Technical School
Bradford School	Pittsburgh	Associate's Health & Business School
Brightwood Career Institute (formerly Kaplan Career Institute)	Broomall, Delaware County; Swatara Township, Dauphin (Harrisburg Campus); Philadelphia; Philadelphia Mills; Pittsburgh (Pittsburgh Campus)	Associate's Health & Business School
Cambria-Rowe Business College	Johnstown (Main Campus); Indiana (Indiana Campus)	Associate's Health & Business School
Career Training Academy	Lower Burrell (Main Campus); Monroeville; North Hills (Pittsburgh Campus)	Associate's Technical School
CHI Institute (renamed Brightwood Career Institute)	Radnor Township, Delaware County (Broomall Campus); Philadelphia (Franklin Mills Campus)	Associate's Technical School
Consolidated School of Business	East Hempfield Township, Lancaster County	Associate's Health & Business School
Dean Institute of Technology	Pittsburgh (Allegheny County)	Associate's Technical School
Delaware Valley Academy of Medical and Dental Assistants	Philadelphia	Associate's Health School
Douglas Education Center	Monessen (Washington County)	Associate's Health & Business School
DeVry University	Upper Dublin Township, Montgomery County	Comprehensive Master's Institution
Erie Institute of Technology	Millcreek Township, Erie County	Associate's Technical School
Fortis Institute	Fairview Township, Erie County (Erie Campus); Swoyersville (Forty Fort Campus); Scranton (Scranton Campus)	Associate's Health & Business School
JNA Institute of Culinary Arts	Philadelphia	Associate's Cooking School
Keystone Technical Institute	Lower Paxton Township, Dauphin County	Associate's Technical School
Lansdale School of Business	Upper Gwynedd Township, Montgomery County	Associate's Health & Business School
Laurel Institute	Uniontown (Laurel Business Institute); Meadville (Laurel Technical Institute); Sharon (Laurel Technical Institute); Wexford (Laurel Technical Institute)	Associate's Health & Business School
Lincoln Technical Institute	Upper Macungie Township (Allentown Campus); Philadelphia (Philadelphia and Northeast Philadelphia Campuses)	Associate's Technical School
McCann School of Business and Technology	Allentown; Carlisle; Dickson City; Hazleton; Lewisburg; Wilkes-Barre	Associate's Health & Business School
New Castle School of Trades	Pulaski Township, Lawrence County	Associate's Technical School
Orleans Technical Institute	Philadelphia	Associate's Technical School
Pennco Tech	Bristol Township, Bucks	Associate's Technical School
Penn Commercial Business and Technical School	South Strabane Township, Washington County	Associate's Health & Business School
Pennsylvania Institute of Health and Technology	North Union Township, Fayette County	Associate's Health & Business School
University of Phoenix	Philadelphia	Comprehensive Master's Institution
Pittsburgh Technical College	North Fayette Township, Allegheny County	Associate's Technical School
Precision Manufacturing Institute	Meadville	Associate's Technical School
Prism Career Institute	Upper Darby Township, Delaware County	Associate's Health & Business School
The Restaurant School at Walnut Hill College	Philadelphia	Baccalaureate College
Rosedale Technical Institute	Robinson Township	Associate's Technical School
South Hills School of Business and Technology	State College (Main Campus); Altoona	Associate's Health & Business School
Star Technical Institute	Philadelphia	Associate's Technical School
Strayer University	Upper Saucon Township, Lehigh County (Allentown Campus); Philadelphia (Center City Campus); Springfield Township, Delaware County (Delaware Valley Campus); Bensalem Township, Bucks County (Lower Bucks Campus); Marshall Township, Allegheny County (Warrendale Campus)	Comprehensive Master's Institution
Thompson Institute (renamed Brightwood Career Institute)	Philadelphia	Associate's Technical School
Triangle Tech	Hanover Township, Northampton County (Bethlehem Campus); Sandy Township, Clearfield County (DuBois Campus); Erie (Erie Campus); Greensburg (Greensburg Campus); Pittsburgh (Pittsburgh Campus); Upper Augusta Township, Northumberland County (Sunbury Campus)	Associate's Technical School
Vet Tech Institute	Pittsburgh	Associate's Health School
YTI Career Institute	Logan Township, Blair County (Altoona Campus); East Hempfield Township, Lancaster County (Lancaster Campus); Springettsbury Township, York County (York Campus)	Associate's Health & Business School
