= List of colleges and universities in Pittsburgh =

The greater Pittsburgh area is home to several colleges and universities listed in order of size, below:

== Non-profit colleges and universities ==
Ranked in order of size:

Rank	Institution	Location	Degree(s) granted	Students	% out of state	Founded
1	University of Pittsburgh	Pittsburgh	BA, BS, BASW, BSE, BSN, BPhil, MA, MS, MLIS, MBA, JD, MD, PharmD, EdD, PhD	29,178	43%	1787
2	Community College of Allegheny County	Pittsburgh	Assoc.	18,913	2%	1966
3	Carnegie Mellon University	Pittsburgh	BA, BS, BFA, BSA, BCSA, MA, MS, MET, MHCI, MBA, PhD	14,799	82%	1900
4	Duquesne University	Pittsburgh	BA, BM, BS, MA, MM, MS, MBA, JD, PsyD, PhD, PharmD, DO, EdD	10,364	25%	1878
5	Indiana University of Pennsylvania	Indiana	BA, BS, MBA, PhD	9,246	7%	1875
6	Pennsylvania Western University, California	California	BA, BS, MA, MS, PhD	8,608	10%	1852
7	Slippery Rock University of Pennsylvania	Slippery Rock	BA, BS, BFA, BSBA, BSEd, BSN, BM, MA, MS, MSW, MEd, MMT, MPH, MBA, PhD, EdD, DPT, DOT	8,559	11%	1889
8	Westmoreland Community College	Youngwood	Assoc.	7,202		1970
9	Robert Morris University	Moon Township	BA, BFA, BS, BSBA, BSN, MBA, MEd, MS, MSN, NP, PhD	5,181	16%	1921
10	Point Park University	Pittsburgh	PhD, MBA	3,827	21%	1960
11	Butler Community College	Butler Township	Assoc.	3,813	1%	1965
12	Franciscan University	Steubenville, Ohio	BA, BS, MBA	2,731		1946
13	Beaver Community College	Center Township	Assoc.	2,576	5%	1966
14	Eastern Gateway Community College	Steubenville, Ohio	Assoc.	2,532		1966
15	West Liberty University	West Liberty, West Virginia	BA MA	2,530		1837
16	Seton Hill University	Greensburg	BA MA	2,500		1885
17	Grove City College	Grove City	BA, BS	2,373	53%	1876
18	Chatham University	Pittsburgh	BA MA	2,300		1869
19	Pittsburgh Technical College	Oakdale	BA, BS	2,000		1946
20	St. Vincent College	Latrobe	BA	1,929		1846
21	Carlow University	Pittsburgh	BA MA	2,453		1929
22	Geneva College	Beaver Falls	BA	1,879		1848
23	University of Pittsburgh at Greensburg	Hempfield	BA	1,325	12%	1963
24	La Roche University	McCandless	BA	1,707		1963
25	Washington & Jefferson College	Washington	BA	1,519		1781
26	Westminster College	New Wilmington	BA M.Ed.	1,550		1852
27	Waynesburg University	Waynesburg	BA MA MS MBA PhD	1,322		1849
28	PSU Fayette	Lemont Furnace	BA	1,119		1965
29	Bethany College	Bethany, West Virginia	BA	1,030		1840
30	PSU Beaver	Center Township	BA	759	8%	1965
31	PSU Allegheny	McKeesport	BA	635	9%	1934
32	PSU New Kensington	New Kensington	BA	715	2%	1958
33	UPMC Shadyside School of Nursing	Pittsburgh	RN	488		1884
34	Pittsburgh Institute of Aeronautics	West Mifflin	Assoc.	285		1929
35	Trinity School for Ministry	Ambridge	BA	150		1975
36	IUP (Northpointe)	Freeport	BA			2004
37	Waynesburg University (Southpointe)	Canonsburg	BA			2001
38	LECOM at Seton Hill	Greensburg	DO			1992
39	Pittsburgh Theological Seminary	Pittsburgh	M.Div, M.T.S., D.Min			1794
40	West Penn Hospital School of Nursing	Pittsburgh	RN			1892
41	Reformed Presbyterian Seminary	Pittsburgh	M.Div, M.T.S., D.Min			1810
42	Byzantine Catholic Seminary	Pittsburgh	BA			1950
43	Bidwell Training Center	Pittsburgh	Assoc., Diplomas	approx. 200		1968
44	Art Institute of Pittsburgh	Pittsburgh	BA, BS, Assoc., Diplomas	CLOSED		1921

== For-profit colleges and universities ==
College/university	Students	Founded
University of Phoenix: Pittsburgh	113	
Vet Tech Institute	316	
ITT Technical Institute: Pittsburgh	350	
Triangle Tech	265	
Triangle Tech: Greensburg	165	
Pennsylvania Institute of Health and Technology	101	
Pittsburgh Institute of Mortuary Science	209	
Rosedale Technical Institute	328	
Penn Commercial Business and Technical School-Wash	285	
Duff's Business Institute		
Newport Business Institute Lower Burrell		
New Castle School of Trades		
Laurel Business Institute Uniontown	185	
Kaplan Career Institute Pittsburgh	719	
Erie Business Center South-New Castle	65	
Everest Institute Pittsburgh	636	
Dean Institute of Technology	149	
Douglas Education Center Monessen	250	
Cambria-Rowe Business College	91	
Career Training Academy: New Kensington	56	
Career Training Academy: Monroeville	28	
Career Training Academy: Pittsburgh	31	
Bradford School	441	
Pittsburgh Filmmakers' School of Film, Photography, and Digital Media		

== Theological seminaries ==
- Pittsburgh Theological Seminary
- Reformed Presbyterian Theological Seminary
- Trinity School for Ministry
- Byzantine Catholic Seminary of SS. Cyril and Methodius
- St. Paul Seminary

== Art and culinary schools ==
- Art Institute of Pittsburgh
- Pittsburgh Filmmakers' School of Film, Photography, and Digital Media
- American Academy of Culinary Arts (AACA)
