= List of colleges and universities in Philadelphia =

The following is an incomplete list of colleges and universities in Philadelphia and the surrounding area.

== Philadelphia ==
=== Two-year colleges and technical schools ===
- ASPIRA City College
- Community College of Philadelphia
- Esperanza College of Eastern University
- Lincoln Technical Institute, Center City and Northeast Philadelphia
- Orleans Technical College
- Pennsylvania Institute of Technology, Center City and Media
- Star Technical Institute
- Talmudical Yeshiva of Philadelphia

=== Four-year colleges and universities ===
==== Public institutions ====
===== State institutions =====
- West Chester University, Center City Philadelphia campus

===== State-related institutions =====
- Temple University
- Lincoln University, University City campus

==== Private institutions ====
- Chestnut Hill College
- The Curtis Institute of Music
- Drexel University
- Holy Family University
- La Salle University
- Moore College of Art and Design
- Peirce at Lackawanna College
- Walnut Hill College
- Saint Joseph's University
- Strayer University, Center City Campus
- Thomas Jefferson University
- University of Pennsylvania

=== Graduate institutions ===
==== Public institutions ====
- Temple University School of Podiatric Medicine

==== Private institutions ====
- The Lutheran Theological Seminary at Philadelphia
- Philadelphia College of Osteopathic Medicine
- The Reconstructionist Rabbinical College
- Westminster Theological Seminary

== Philadelphia metropolitan area ==
=== Two-year colleges and technical schools ===
- Atlantic Cape Community College, Mays Landing, Atlantic City, and Cape May Court House, New Jersey
- Bucks County Community College, Newtown, Bristol and Perkasie
- Community College of Philadelphia
- Camden County College, Blackwood, Camden and Cherry Hill, New Jersey
- Cumberland County College, Vineland, New Jersey
- Delaware County Community College, Marple Township, Downingtown, Exton, Phoenixville, Sharon Hill, Upper Darby and West Grove
- Delaware Technical Community College, Wilmington, Delaware
- Goldey-Beacom College, Wilmington, Delaware
- Harcum College, Bryn Mawr
- Montgomery County Community College, Blue Bell and Pottstown
- Rowan College at Burlington County (formerly Burlington County College), Mt. Laurel, New Jersey, and Pemberton, New Jersey
- Rowan College of South Jersey, Sewell, New Jersey
- Salem Community College, Carneys Point, New Jersey
- Williamson Free School of Mechanical Trades, Media

=== Four-year colleges and universities ===
==== Public institutions ====
- Cheyney University, Cheyney
- Lincoln University, near Oxford
- Penn State Abington, Abington
- Penn State Brandywine, Media
- Rowan University, Glassboro, New Jersey
- Rutgers University–Camden, Camden, New Jersey
- Stockton University, Pomona, New Jersey
- Temple University Ambler, Ambler
- Thomas Edison State University, Trenton, New Jersey
- West Chester University, West Chester

==== Private institutions ====
- Arcadia University, Glenside
- Bryn Athyn College, Bryn Athyn
- Bryn Mawr College, Bryn Mawr
- Cairn University, Langhorne
- Delaware Valley University, Doylestown
- Eastern University, St. Davids
- Goldey-Beacom College, Wilmington, Delaware
- Gwynedd Mercy University, Lower Gwynedd Township
- Gratz College, Elkins Park
- Haverford College, Haverford
- Immaculata University, Malvern
- Manor College, Jenkintown
- Neumann University, Aston
- Princeton University, Princeton, New Jersey
- Rosemont College, Rosemont
- St. Charles Borromeo Seminary, Wynnewood
- Strayer University, Bensalem
- Swarthmore College, Swarthmore
- Ursinus College, Collegeville
- University of Valley Forge, Phoenixville
- Villanova University, Villanova
- Widener University, Chester
- Wilmington University, New Castle, Delaware

==== Hybrid institutions ====
- University of Delaware, Newark, Delaware

=== Graduate institutions ===
==== Public institutions ====
- Cooper Medical School of Rowan University, Camden, New Jersey
- Penn State Great Valley School of Graduate Professional Studies, Malvern
- Rowan-Virtua School of Osteopathic Medicine, Stratford, New Jersey
- Rutgers Law School, Camden, New Jersey

==== Private institutions ====
- Delaware Valley University, Doylestown
- Palmer Theological Seminary, King of Prussia
- St. Charles Borromeo Seminary Graduate School of Theology, Wynnewood
- Salus University, Elkins Park
- Villanova University Charles Widger School of Law, Villanova
- Won Institute of Graduate Studies, Glenside

== Former institutions ==
- Antonelli Institute, Erdenheim
- Berean Institute
- Cabrini University
- Delaware Valley Academy of Medical and Dental Assistants
- Hussian School of Art
- Pennsylvania Academy of the Fine Arts
- Philadelphia University
- Spring Garden College
- Thompson Institute
- University of the Arts
- University of the Sciences
