= Pennsylvania University =

Pennsylvania University may refer to:

- Pennsylvania State University, a public university
  - Penn State University Park
  - Pennsylvania State University Commonwealth campuses
- Pennsylvania State System of Higher Education, a state government agency
- University of Pennsylvania, a private university

== See also ==
- List of colleges and universities in Pennsylvania
- Gettysburg College, originally named Pennsylvania College
