= List of awards and honors received by Jill Biden =

The First Lady of the United States Jill Biden has received numerous honors in recognition of her career in education and politics. These include:

== Scholastic ==
Chancellor, visitor, governor, rector and fellowships

Location	Date	School	Position
Delaware	1993 – 2008	Delaware Technical Community College (Stanton/Wilmington Campus)	English and Writing Instructor
Virginia	2008 – Present	Northern Virginia Community College	Professor of English

Honorary degrees

Location	Date	School	Degree	Gave Commencement Address
New York	June 2009	City University of New York	Doctor of Humane Letters (DHL)	Yes at Kingsborough Community College
Delaware	9 January 2010	University of Delaware	Doctorate	Yes
Rhode Island	15 May 2011	Salve Regina University	Doctor of Humane Letters (DHL)	Yes
Pennsylvania	19 May 2011	Montgomery County Community College	Associate of Letters	Yes
Pennsylvania	16 May 2014	Villanova University	Doctor of Humanities (DHL)	Yes
New York	21 May 2017	Hofstra University	Doctor of Humane Letters (DHL)	Yes

== Awards ==
Location	Date	Institution	Award
Delaware	8 January 2018	Delaware State Chamber of Commerce	Josiah Marvel Cup Award: Awarded with Joseph R. Biden Jr.
