= Tom Savini's Special Make-Up Effects Program =

Two-year academic program

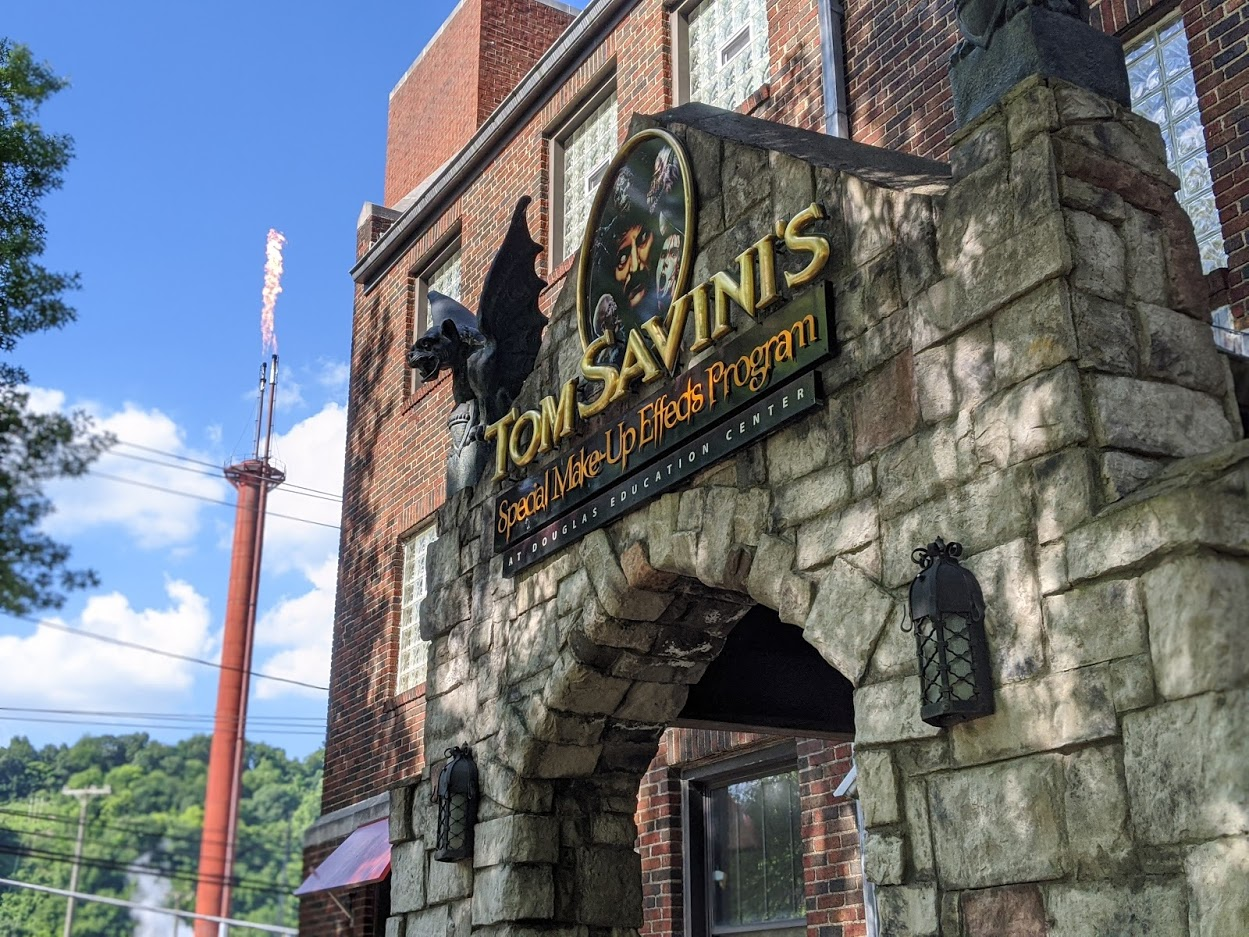
The entryway to the building housing the Tom Savini Special Make-Up Effects Program in Monessen, Pennsylvania.

Tom Savini's Special Make-Up Effects Program is a 16-month academic program consisting of four semesters at the Douglas Education Center in Monessen, Pennsylvania, outside of Pittsburgh, Pennsylvania. The program awards an associate degree in Specialized Business. The program began in 2000.

The program curriculum was designed by Tom Savini, a horror special effects and makeup artist known for his work in Friday the 13th, Dawn of the Dead, and Day of the Dead. Instructors also include long-term Savini associates, including Jerry Gergely, who earned a 1998 Emmy nomination for his makeup work for Babylon 5.

Students study Make-up Application, Mold Making and Casting, Animation Fabrication, and Exhibit and Display Design. In addition to learning the skills with special effects and make-up for films, students learn skills that can be applied in creating scenes for museums, molding prosthetic limbs, or creating toys. Program alumni have gone on to work at McFarlane Toys, Smithsonian Institution, Universal Studios Halloween Horror Nights, KNB EFX Group, Jordu Schell, and Saturday Night Live.

As of 2010, the program had 144 students with an average age 24.

Work by a Savini instructor.

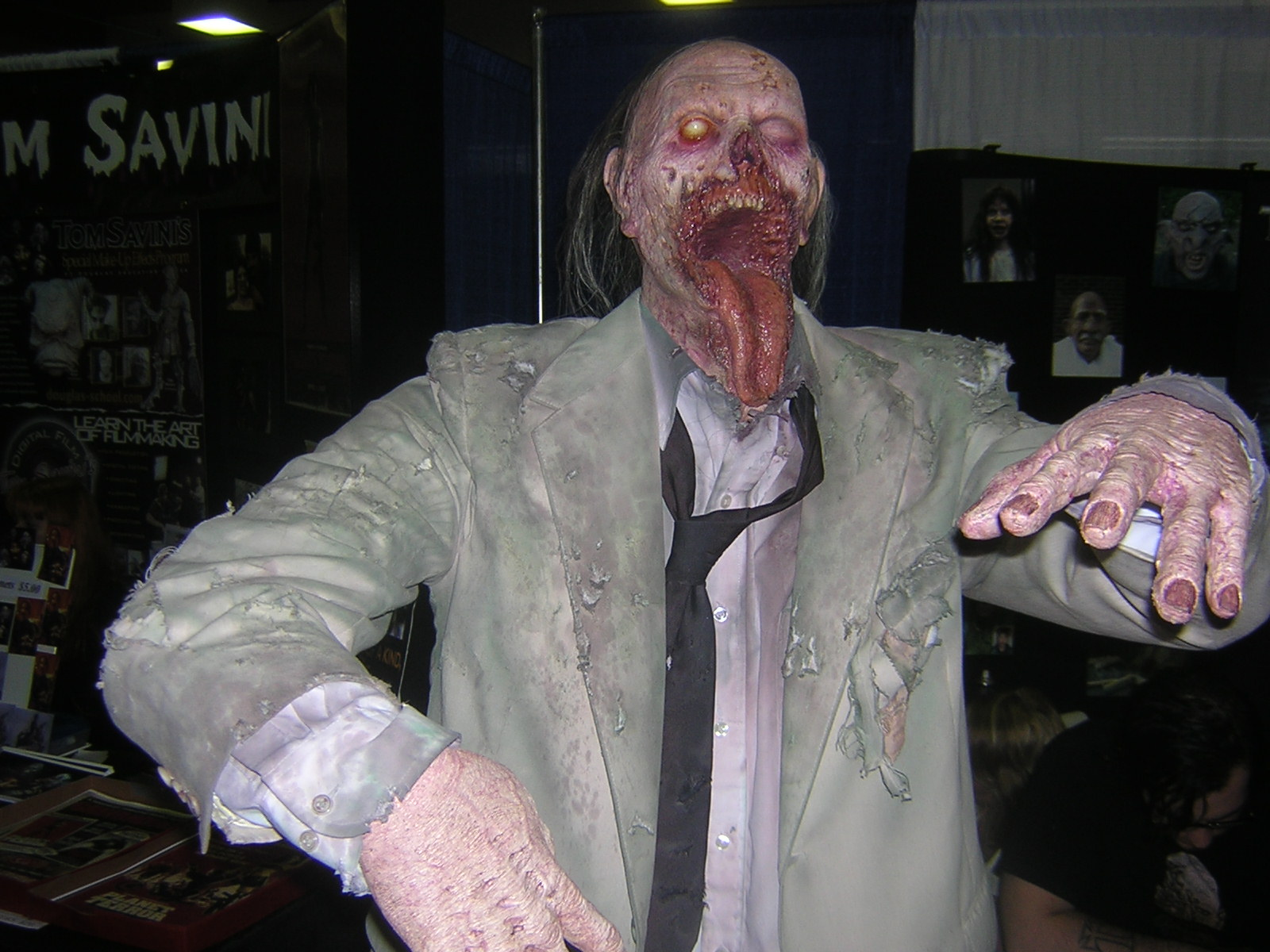
A zombie, as done by Savini instructor Eric Molinaris at the 2008 Pittsburgh Comicon.
