= Cheondojae =

Buddhist reincarnation rituals

- Hangul: 천도재
- Hanja: 薦度齋
- RR: Cheondojae
- MR: Ch'ŏndojae

Cheondojae (Korean: 천도재) is a Korean umbrella term for Buddhist rituals based on reincarnation. Cheondojae is also known as after-death ceremonies or Buddhist funeral rites. Buddhists believe when someone dies, their soul is held for 49 days between death and rebirth. Because a soul without a body in a transient state can better accept the law of truth, it can gain enlightenment and move on to the next life. Cheondojae helps the soul reincarnate to a better place.

== Etymology ==
"Cheondo" means to go to a better state in the next life. "Jae" relates to Uposatha, a Buddhist day of observance.

== Origin ==
The origin of Cheondojae comes from an ancient Hindu ritual called śraddhā. A preta, or hungry ghost, is the soul that exists after death but before karmic reincarnation. Hindus believe the soul needs guidance. Without guidance, the soul is unlikely to reincarnate. Rituals are needed to remove bad karma.

In Buddhism, Preta is also a soul in the transient state. Rituals give knowledge of the teachings of the Buddha to the soul, so it will achieve rebirth. The soul can achieve reincarnation by itself, but the ceremonial rites, Cheondojae, help it toward reincarnation.

== Types ==
=== Sasipgu-jae ===
This seven-step ritual has evolved from other traditional funeral rites rituals. It is the most basic ritual. It is shorter and simpler than the original, formal rituals. It is usually held at home, performed by family members of the deceased. The other rituals are formally done by monks at temples.

==== 49-Day Ritual ====
Each step of the process is completed in order:

1. Siryeon (시련, 侍輦): Welcome the spirit.
2. Daeryeong (대령, 對靈): The spirit is invited in and greeted. They are offered a simple food offering and told about the teachings of Buddha.
3. Gwanyok (관욕, 灌浴): In a spiritual bath, the bad karma is washed away to cleanse the spirit.
4. Shinjungjakbup (신중작법, 神衆作法): An invitation to the gods and guardians. The family members pray to the guardians so the ritual may be completed without any obstacles.
5. Sangdangweongong (상단권공, 上壇勸供): An offering to the Buddhas and bodhisattvas.
6. Gweoneumsisik (관음시식, 觀飮施食): The main memorial service inside of the ritual, the mourners offer food and the spirit is taught the teachings of Buddha.
7. Bongsong (봉송, 奉送): Finally, on Day 49, the spirit is sent off and the family bows to end the ceremony and after the ceremony has concluded, they eat the offering food together.

=== Sangjugwongongjae ===
Sangjugwongongjae (상주권공재) is also the basic 49-day death ritual. It is the most common ritual, often conducted at a Buddhist temple. The process always starts with an invitation for the deceased to join the ceremony or to enter the room where the ceremony is being held. Then, steps are taken to release any bad karma the soul may be holding. Offerings and prayers to the Buddha come next, followed by food that is served to the soul. The soul is sent back to where it came from and the ritual is complete.

==== Sangjugwongongjae Ritual ====
Each step of the process is completed in order:

1. Ordeal: Call the spirit into Yeongdan (靈壇.)
2. Daeryung: Explain to the spirit that the Cheondojae is based on the Buddha's law.
3. Awakening (觀浴): In a kind of spiritual bathing ritual, to solve all of the karmic obstacles blocking the path to rebirth in the ‘Pure Land,’ the spirit hears about the Buddha's Dharma.
4. Heongong (獻供): Both the spirit and the monks perform offerings and prayers to the Buddha, whether spiritual or sacrificial.
5. Sinjungheongong (神衆獻供): A ceremony to make offerings to the Gods of Heaven and Earth/Guardians and pray for their care.
6. Ceremony-Cheondojae (薦度齋): A ceremony performed to pray for the soul of the deceased by relying on the mercy of Bodhisattva. During this ceremony, Dharma Talks are given, such as Geobul (擧佛). Goebul is a traditional song for bowing and calling the name of Buddha in front of Buddhist statues. This forces the spirit to acknowledge the belief of Buddha.
7. Bongsong (奉送): The ceremony to say farewell to the spirit and to send it back to where it came from.
8. Desang (脫喪): The final ritual to be released from the ceremony and to be allowed to return to normal life.

=== Yeongsanjae ===
Yeongsanjae (영산재) is a ceremonial procedure that was designated a spot on the UNESCO Intangible Cultural Heritage List in 2009. It is a re-enactment of Buddha's delivery of what would become the Lotus Sutra on Vulture Peak Mountain in India. The purpose of this ceremony is to bring the spirits to enlightenment. Yeongsanjae is usually performed for large organizations or loss of life, like for soldiers, mass tragedies, or notable people.

==== Ritual ====
Each step of the process is completed in order:

1. Siryeon (시련): Welcoming the spirits of heaven and earth and all the saints. To receive the teachings of the Buddha and Buddhas who guide them, a sacred ceremony is performed.
2. Daeryeong (대령): The owner of consciousness is the spirit, dead or alive. The dead spirits are invited to the ceremony, and those who participate in the ceremony are told why the ceremony is being held and given instructions according to the Dharma. The family of the deceased offers food and drink (rituals) as a sign of love and respect for the deceased.
3. Gwanyok (관욕, 灌浴): This is a purification ritual to wash away the three karmic obstacles of the spirit to attain tranquility.
4. Jojeonjeoman (조전점안, 造錢點眼): ‘Jojeon’ refers to the money to be used in the Myeongbu (冥府, afterlife), and Eunjeon means to give value as money. The need for money makes the spirits realize that their lives are sustained by material blessings from outside the body.
5. Shinjungjakbup (신중작법, 神衆作法): A tea ceremony is performed for all of the sacred spirits invited to ensure that the ceremony proceeds smoothly.
6. Gwaebuliun (괘불이운, 掛佛移運): Shakyamuni Buddha, who is the master of the ceremony and the one who will teach the Lotus Sutra, and all Buddhists and Bodhisattvas are received according to the Buddha Law.
7. Sangdangweongong (상단권공, 上壇勸供): A meal is served to invite the Buddha and Buddhas. In this ceremony, it is hoped that all sentient beings will gain happiness through the merciful grace of the Buddha and Buddhas and that the light of Buddha's truth will shine through all of the suffering in the world.
8. Beopmun (법문): The monk reaffirms the purpose of the ceremony and gives a detailed sermon on how to complete it. The monk recites a sermon to lead the audience to the door of truth.
9. Sikdangjakbup (식당작법): The offering ceremony is not for the Buddha and Buddhas, but for the monks attending the ceremony. However, it symbolizes something for all sentient beings in this universe, and by performing this ceremony, it prepares the foundation for becoming a Buddha.
10. Jungdangweongong (중단권공, 中壇勸供): The monks ask all of the attendees to take the ceremony seriously and behave so the ritual may proceed smoothly. The monk also asks for blessings for all who attend the ceremony.
11. Sisik (시식, 施食): It is a ritual to rejoice that the participants in the ceremony were fortunate to be able to hear the Buddha's words and that the dead went to paradise. This ritual is held for the departed as a happy rather than sad ceremony. It is intended to celebrate and rejoice in the rebirth of the departed.
12. Bongsong (봉송, 奉送) and Sodaebaesong (소대배송, 燒臺拜送): All sentient beings in attendance receive praise from the monks for their respect so far and are requested to continue in an even more serious manner until the end of the ceremony. If the attendees are not respectful, it can affect the final destination of the dead. Then the monks start the main Bongsong. They say farewell to the spirits and send them back to where they came from.

=== Suryukjae ===
Suryukjae (수륙재) is a ritual to guide all of the spirits from both land and water to the next world. This ritual is different as it is performed for both the living and the dead. This ritual was recorded in a ritual book titled Seokmunuibum and published in 1935 by a monk named Seokchan. The ritual has evolved and is now performed in temples such as Samhwasa Temple and Jikwansa Temple.

==== Seokmunuibum Suryukjae Ritual ====
Each step of the process is completed in order:

1. First, clarify the purpose of starting the ritual.
2. Awaken the minds of Buddhas so that the soul can hear the Dharma sermon from the Buddha and Buddhas.
3. Burn incense to prepare to welcome the Myeongbu messenger, a guardian that escorts the spirit to the Myeongbu, the judgment hall in the netherworld, where ten kings judge the fates of the deceased by the deeds they committed in their living life.
4. Invite the messenger to make offerings and send congratulatory wishes. This ceremony is performed outside the door.
5. Make an offering to the god of the five directions to clean the ash from the incense. Burn another incense so all of the ash is clean.
6. Serve the Myeongbu messengers, purify the ceremony, and give offerings to the three treasures of Buddhist monks.
7. After making offerings to the next law-protecting good gods, such as Heaven, Eight Goddess, and Dragon King, ask for and make offerings to the three jewels, which are Buddhist beliefs.
8. Then, the soul's body is cleansed and after performing the ceremony and changing the body into new clothes with the will of the Dharma, an offering is offered to the Buddha and Buddhas for the deceased soul. The Buddha and Buddhas offer their blessing, which forgives their past mistakes.
9. Afterward, a ceremony to serve food to the deceased takes place. At this time, all food is changed into food that can be used in the rite, so the deceased can receive it.
10. Lastly, repentance and the four vows take place and the deceased becomes a proper Buddhist disciple.

==== Samhwasa Suryukjae Ritual ====
Each step of the process is completed in order:

1. Siryeon (시련, 侍輦)
2. Daeryeong (대령,對靈)
3. Jojeonjeoman
4. Shinjungjakbup (신중작법, 神衆作法)
5. Gwaebuliun (괘불이운, 掛佛移運)
6. Swaesugyeolgye
7. Sajadan (사자단, 使者壇)
8. Orodan (오로단, 五路壇)
9. Sangdan
10. Seolbeo
11. Jungdan
12. Bangsaeng
13. Hadan
14. Bosong/Hoehyang (봉송회향, 奉送回向)

==== Jingwansa Suryukjae Ritual ====
1. Siryeon (시련, 侍輦): The monks and attendees greet the soul at the Iljumun Gate of the temple.
2. Daeryeong (대령,對靈): The procession moves inside the gate and sets up in front of the Hongjeru. A simple service is held, where noodles and tea are served. Everyone bows.
3. Gwanyok (관욕, 灌浴): A bathhouse is set up behind the Daeryeong area. Inside the bathhouse, there are towels, scented water, and long brushes made of willow branches. Nanjing mirrors are prepared. After this spiritual bath is finished, the spirit bows to the Buddha in the main hall.
4. Shinjungjakbup (신중작법, 神衆作法): Before the hall is opened, there is a big ceremony to call on the disciples that guard the Buddha's Dharma.
5. Gwaebuliun (괘불이운, 掛佛移運): To symbolize the sermon the Buddha gave on Vulture Peak Mountain, a large-scale painting is carried out from the main hall and hung on a stand. It was believed long ago that enshrining this painting would remove all obstacles and bring peace.
6. Yeongsanjakbup (영산작법, 靈山作法): The Yeongsan hoesang is performed with dancing by the monks in attendance to tell the story of the Buddha's sermon.
7. Bupmoon (법문, 法門): An elder monk gives a message of enlightenment.
8. Suryukyeongi (수륙연기, 水陸緣起): This is the largest ceremony within the ritual. It tells the story of one of the Buddha's disciples, Ananda. Ananda was alone at midnight when a hungry ghost named Myeonyeon appeared. He said three days after Ananda died, he would be reborn as a hungry ghost. Scared, Ananda asked how to stop this from happening. The ghost told him to offer food to Nayuta sailors found at dawn to the hungry ghosts. He should also give food equally to the Brahmins and sages. Finally, he should offer the three jewels and his life would be prolonged and Myeonyeon would be reborn into heaven, no longer hungry. Ananda told the Buddha this story and the Buddha told him not to be afraid. The Buddha preached the Great Dharani to Ananda and tells him to recite it seven times. This will allow the food to feed all of the hungry spirits, Brahmins, and sages. Ananda performed the ceremony.
9. Sajadan (사자단, 使者壇): To open the ceremony to all Buddhas, Bodhisattvas, and lonely souls, a lion is invited and given an offering. The lion receives the food and shares a document announcing the opening of the land in all ten directions.
10. Orodan (오로단, 五路壇): A service is held to open the five directions of the sky (North, South, East, West, and Center.)
11. Sangdan (상단소청, 上壇所請): All Buddhas and Bodhisattvas are called for.
12. Jungdan (중단소청, 中壇所請): The three chief Bodhisattvas and their followers are called for.
13. Hadan (하단소청, 下壇所請): All lonely souls are called for.
14. Sangdan (상단권공, 上壇勸供): Tribute is paid to all Buddha sand Bodhisattvas.
15. Jungdan (중단권공, 中壇勸供): Offerings are made to the three chief Bodhisattvas and their followers.
16. Hadan (하단시식, 下壇施食): A meal is given to all of the lonely souls.
17. Hoehyang (봉송회향, 奉送回向): The monks and attendees escort all the Buddhas, Bodhisattvas, and lonely souls out of the temple and send them off. Objects and papers are burned at the altar and the ceremony ends.

=== Gakbaejae ===
Gakbaejae's (각배재) process is similar to Sangjugwongongjae, however, Gakbaejae has an additional belief in Myeongbu, the Judgement Hall, and the kings that reside there. This belief is also seen in the Suryukjae ceremony.

== Won Buddhism ==
When Won Buddhism was created, it sought to simplify the Confucian rituals. The old rituals were too restrictive and troublesome, according to Master Sotaesan, the founder of Won Buddhism.

The rituals would serve two purposes: to allow family and friends to say their goodbyes and to allow the soul to achieve nirvana. Won Buddhism follows a 49-day ritual held every seven days. It starts with the First Deliverance and ends with the Final Deliverance. Won Buddhists believe the soul is in a transitional state for 49 days, and the funeral rites guide the soul to have a pure mind. They also help the soul break attachments that remain to help it reach Nirvana. Won Buddhists recite the Instruction on Repentance to help purify the soul.

The first six ceremonies are performed every seven days. On the 49th day, the Final Deliverance sends the soul off.

=== The First to Sixth Deliverance Ritual ===
1. Opening
2. Entering Samadhi and reading Ceremonial Text 25 from the Canon of Propriety, a collection of ceremonies for coming of age, weddings, funerals, and ancestral rites.
3. Donations are offered to increase the soul's goodness or worthiness in the next life by a family member.
4. Affirmations and Ceremonial Text 24, then bowing.
5. Reciting the Buddha's mantras.
6. Reading Ceremonial Texts 4 and 5 to give Dharma instructions for sending the spirit on.
7. Reciting the Irwonsang Vow and Ceremonial Text 29.
8. Closing

=== The Final Deliverance Ritual ===
1. Opening
2. Entering Samadhi and reading Ceremonial Text 25.
3. Telling the person's achievements in this life.
4. Reading of Hymn 46 (The Song of Dharma.)
5. Donations are offered to increase the soul's goodness or worthiness in the next life by a family member and Ceremonial Texts 31 and 32.
6. Affirmations and the reading of Ceremonial Text 24, then bowing.
7. Reciting the Buddha's mantras and the Buddha's name.
8. Reading Ceremonial Texts 4 and 5 to give Dharma instructions for sending the spirit on.
9. Reciting the Irwonsang Vow and Ceremonial Text 33.
10. Dharma Talks
11. Burning of incense.
12. Removing the clothing of mourning and reading Ceremonial Text 34.
13. Reporting the donations given.
14. Reading of Hymns 44 and 52 (The Songs of Memorial.)
15. Closing

== Won Buddhism and Confucianism ==
Won Buddhism's Cheondojae merged concepts of Buddhism's reincarnation and Confucianism's formality. Because of Confucianism, Won Buddhism often focuses on the elderly and family, so the funeral rituals feature the family. Confucianism holds a large influence on Cheondojae in Won Buddhism.

Though the Cheondojae in Won Buddhism follows a similar 49-day structure to Buddhism, there are differences in the rituals. One main difference between Cheondojae in Won Buddhism is its repentance procedure, which encourages individuals to repent their mistakes and sins to create new karma.

Won Buddhism also differs from Buddhism in that it only has the 49-day ritual and not the other big events due to the modernization of the ceremonies and the belief that it should not cost much to honor the dead.

The final, major difference is Won Buddhism believes Nirvana means death. All souls are able to achieve Nirvana if the family members do not hinder the soul from the Way of Nirvana. Traditional Buddhist beliefs differ on the definition and way to achieve Nirvana.
