= Pennsylvania Collegiate Athletic Association =

Athletic conference in Pennsylvania, United States

The Pennsylvania Collegiate Athletic Association (PCAA) was an athletic conference established in 1972 in the Commonwealth of Pennsylvania as a partnership between the Eastern Pennsylvania Athletic Association (EPCC) and Western Pennsylvania Athletic Association (WPCC). The conference was established for two-year institutions. The Association ceased to exist in June 2012. Both the EPCC and the WPCC were separate entities functioning as athletic conferences, both with long-standing success and local notoriety. Both the EPCC and the WPCC governed themselves and functioned separately from one another however the EPCC champion and the WPCC champion face each other in a special post-season match to crown a PCAA champion each season within each sport. The PCAA offered competition in a total of six men's sports, six women's sports, and three co-ed team sports.

== The PCAA & The NJCAA ==
Some PCAA members had a partnership with the National Junior College Athletic Association (NJCAA) which served as a level of accountability for the EPCC and the WPCC. The PCAA had adopted many of its policies and regulations from the NJCAA. Although the PCAA was not an officially chartered conference of the NJCAA, several of the schools in both the EPCC and WPCC were member schools of the NJCAA and played in NJCAA sanctioned competition, especially in sports not offered by the PCAA. Many NJCAA schools competed in local/regional post-season tournaments within their conference (such as the EPCC and WPCC championship tournaments) and also competed in national post-season competition, just like most NCAA and NAIA schools do.

== PCAA School Membership ==
The EPCC and WPCC were composed of the junior colleges, community colleges, and technical schools in the Commonwealth of Pennsylvania that have varsity athletic programs. Past Commissioners included Charles "Chuck" Bell CCAC North (three terms) Charles "Chuck" Dunaway Butler CC (two terms), Mike Stanzione Penn College, Bill Bearse Northampton CC amongst many others. RoseAnn Palsi from Northampton CC served as its secretary for 29 years, from 1983 to 2012.

=== EPCC Members ===
- Bucks County Community College
- Central Penn College
- Community College of Philadelphia
- Delaware County Community College
- Harcum College
- Harrisburg Area Community College
- Johnson College
- Lackawanna College
- Lehigh Carbon Community College
- Luzerne County Community College
- Manor College
- Montgomery County Community College
- Northampton Community College
- Reading Area Community College
- Thaddeus Stevens College of Technology

=== WPCC Members ===
- Community College of Allegheny County
- Butler County Community College
- Pennsylvania Highlands Community College

== PCAA sports ==
- Men's soccer
- Men's golf
- Men's baseball (Fall)
- Men's cross country
- Men's basketball
- Men's volleyball
- Men's baseball (Spring)
- Tennis (Co-ed)
- Team Bowling (Co-ed)
- Women's soccer
- Women's golf
- Women's volleyball
- Women's cross country
- Women's basketball
- Women's softball
- Women's tennis

== See also ==
- Garden State Athletic Conference
- Pennsylvania State Athletic Conference
