= Pennsylvania College of Art and Design =

Art school in Lancaster, Pennsylvania

Coordinates: 40.0412°N 76.3087°W

The Pennsylvania College of Art & Design
- Type: Private art and design college
- Established: 1982
- President: Andrew Barnes, Ph.D., M.F.A.
- Administrative staff: 49
- Students: 420
- Location: Lancaster, Pennsylvania, United States
- Mascot: Peacocks
- Website: pcad.edu/

Pennsylvania College of Art & Design (PCA&D or PCAD) is a private art and design college located in Lancaster, Pennsylvania, United States. The college offers Bachelor of Fine Arts (BFA), Bachelor of Arts (BA), Associate of Fine Arts (AFA), and Associate of Arts (AA) degrees, as well as minors, certificate programs, and continuing education opportunities.

== History ==
PCA&D traces its origins to the former York Academy of Arts, which closed in 1982. That year, faculty and community members established the Pennsylvania School of the Arts (PSA) in Marietta, Pennsylvania, offering diploma programs in fine art, interior design, and communication arts.

In 1984, PSA was accredited by the National Association of Schools of Art and Design (NASAD). The school moved to Lancaster in 1987, adopting the name Pennsylvania School of Art & Design (PSAD).

In 1999, the Pennsylvania Department of Education authorized the institution to grant degrees, and in 2001 PSAD secured its permanent campus at 204 North Prince Street, Lancaster. In 2003, the school was granted final approval as a four-year college and renamed Pennsylvania College of Art & Design.

== Campus ==
The main campus is located at 204 North Prince Street in downtown Lancaster, within the city’s arts district. The college is surrounded by galleries, theaters, and cultural organizations.

PCA&D also partners with the Academy of Live Technology at Rock Lititz in Lititz, Pennsylvania, for its Live Experience Design & Production program, giving students access to professional event production and performance facilities.

== Academics ==
PCA&D offers several undergraduate and certificate programs:

- Bachelor of Fine Arts (BFA) in Animation & Game Art, Fine Art, Graphic Design, Illustration, Live Experience Design & Production, and Photography & Video.
- Bachelor of Arts (BA) in Design Thinking.
- Associate of Fine Arts (AFA) in select studio disciplines.
- Associate of Arts (AA) in Design Thinking or Live Experience Design & Production.
- Minors in Art History & Visual Culture, Business in the Creative Industry, Filmmaking, Fashion Merchandising, Esports Management, and more.
- Certificate programs offered through the Center for Creative Exploration.

All first-year students complete a Foundation Year curriculum in drawing, design, and liberal arts before declaring a major. Approximately one-third of all coursework is in liberal arts, supporting the professional and studio training.

== Accreditation ==
The college is accredited by the Middle States Commission on Higher Education (MSCHE). Its accreditation was reaffirmed in 2023.

== Student Life ==
In addition to degree programs, PCA&D offers youth classes, pre-college programs, and adult continuing education through its Center for Creative Exploration. The annual Senior Show serves as the capstone for graduating students, with campus-wide exhibitions of student work.

== Rankings and Recognition ==
According to Niche, PCA&D has been ranked among the top colleges for design in the United States.

== See also ==
- List of colleges and universities in Pennsylvania
- List of art schools
