= Schuylkill Institute of Business and Technology =

Coordinates: 40.68455°N 76.19460°W

Schuylkill Institute of Business and Technology was a private technical college located in Pottsville, Pennsylvania, United States.

The school was founded in 1998, and was sold to MC Education, Inc. in 2000.

In 2006, it was announced that SIBT would be closing at the end of the 2007 year.
