= Won Buddhism =

Modernized form of Buddhism

- Hangul: 원불교
- Hanja: 圓佛敎
- RR: Wonbulgyo
- MR: Wŏnbulgyo

Won Buddhism (Korean: 원불교) is a modern Buddhist religion originating in Korea. The name "Won Buddhism" comes from the Korean words 원/圓 won ("circle") and 불교/佛敎 bulgyo ("Buddhism"), literally meaning "Circle Buddhism" or interpreted as "Consummate Buddhism". It can be regarded as either a syncretic new religious movement or a reformed Buddhism. The stated goals of Won Buddhism are for people to realize their own innate Buddha nature and to save all sentient beings by serving others. Emphasis is on interaction with daily life, not "stilling the impulses", but rather acting in accord with "appropriate desires". Won Buddhism's founder, Sotaesan (Bak Jungbin, 1891–1943) believed that overemphasis on the material world in relation to the spiritual world would create undue suffering; his founding motto was, "With this Great Opening of matter, let there be a Great Opening of spirit."

== Founder and early history ==
=== Background ===
Buddhism was introduced to the Korean peninsula in the fourth century CE. During the Joseon dynasty (1392–1910), Confucianism became the predominant belief system and Buddhism was suppressed. Christianity — initially Catholicism and later Protestantism—was introduced in the late 19th century. Under Japanese occupation (1910–1945), Japanese-oriented Buddhism became prominent in part to counter Christianity's influence. Concurrently during the late 19th/early 20th centuries, new movements arose in Korean Buddhism to reform its traditional elements or form a "new Buddhism", e.g., Won Buddhism.

Won Buddhism is a modern Buddhist tradition that emerged in Korea. The term won, meaning "circle" in Korean, symbolizes the unity of the world and its inhabitants. This spiritual practice seeks to harmonize scientific and economic progress with personal development and ethical values. Established by Sotaesan, who achieved enlightenment in 1916, Won Buddhism was created as a response to the realization that materialistic pursuits were diminishing the human spirit. Sotaesan advocated a return to spiritual fulfillment and communal living. His vision led to a reformation of traditional Buddhist principles, blending them with contemporary needs.

Won Buddhism emphasizes a holistic approach, integrating spirituality with scientific understanding, moral principles with social justice, gender equality, and religious practices with everyday life. Practitioners of Won Buddhism engage in meditation before a won, or circle, rather than traditional Buddhist images. This practice underscores the concept of universal unity and reflects a commitment to merging scientific and economic advancement with personal wisdom and social responsibility. Sotaesan's creation of Won Buddhism is regarded as an evolution of Buddhist teachings, designed to make them more relevant and accessible to modern society. This approach aims to update and revitalize the teachings of Buddhism for contemporary understanding.

=== Founding of Won Buddhism ===
Sotaesan (Korean: 소태산), born Bak Jungbin (Korean: 박중빈; Hanja: 朴重彬, 1891–1943), grew up in a poor village in the southwest corner of the Korean peninsula. His only formal education was two years of local primary schooling, in the Confucian tradition.

Founding Master Sotaesan

According to Won Buddhism tradition, he began asking questions about universal phenomena at age seven and expanded his inquiries to problems of life and death and existence. He began his quest by praying to mountain spirits for four years, following this with equally unsuccessful questioning of those considered enlightened teachers. Finally, he spent several years in deep observation and contemplation, often in harsh physical conditions. By the age of 25, he was viewed as a lost soul by his fellow villagers. On April 28, 1916, he claimed to have experienced enlightenment and entered a state of nirvana. Won Buddhists annually celebrate this date as Great Enlightenment Day.

Sotaesan did not set out specifically to embrace Buddhism; rather, after his enlightenment he examined various religions. Although his thought contained Confucian and Taoist elements, after reading the Diamond Sutra he found himself predisposed to Buddhism.

He then attracted a small group of followers and selected nine disciples. Early guiding principles included diligence, frugality, elimination of formal rituals and superstition, and abstinence from alcohol and smoking Major elements, still central today, are the lack of a wide distinction between laity and the priesthood, equality of men and women, modernizing practice and doctrine, and concern about the swift rise in material development. Early on, Sotaesan sought to improve the daily lives of his followers by establishing a thrift and savings institution, and embarking on an arduous, year-long levee-building project to reclaim 25 acres of land from the sea for rice cultivation.

In August 1919, the nine disciples pledged to follow the new movement even at the cost of their lives. In an event commemorated today as "The Miracle of the Blood Seal", thumbprints placed on a sheet of paper recording their pledge were seen to turn red.

Sotaesan named his community Bulbeop Yeongu Hoe (Society for the Study of the Buddha-dharma) in 1924. It remained a small rural order based in Iksan, North Jeolla Province, until the Japanese occupation ended in 1945. Sotaesan's successor, Jeongsan (Song Gyu) renamed it Wonbulgyo (Won Buddhism) in 1947.

Since the end of Japanese occupation in 1945, Won Buddhism has grown markedly. The precise number of Won Buddhist practitioners worldwide is unclear. In South Korea's 2005 census, approximately 130,000 people identified themselves as members. However, this may be an under-representation, since people could also identify themselves on the census as "Buddhists". Won Buddhist Headquarters estimates the number to be over one million worldwide. Currently, there are approximately five hundred Won Buddhist temples in Korea and over seventy temples and centers in 23 countries.

== Doctrine ==
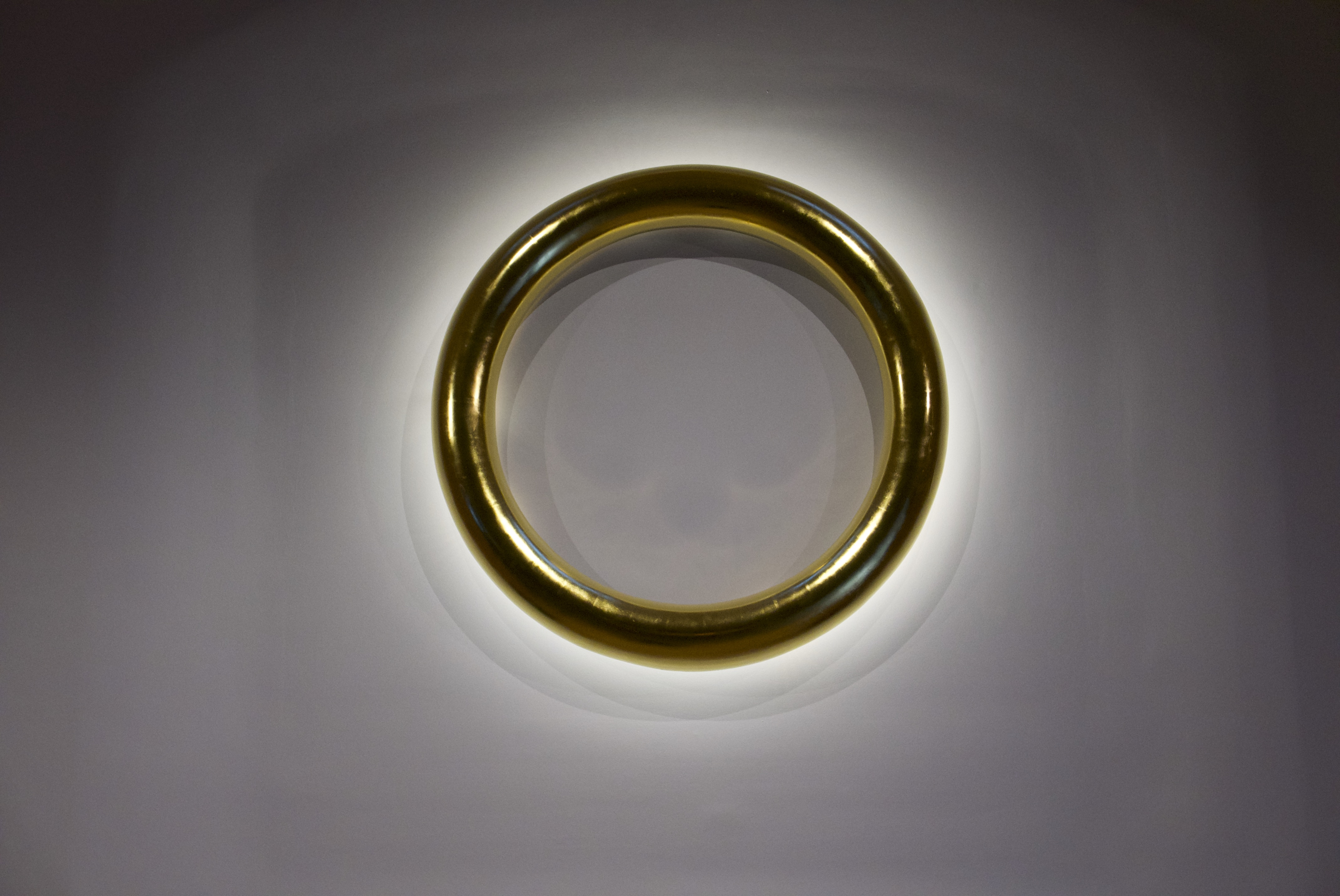
Il Won Sang symbol in a Won Meditation Hall, Chapel Hill, North Carolina

An early treatise written by Sotaesan and published in 1935, the Treatise on the Renovation of Korean Buddhism (Korean: 조선불교개혁; Hanja: 朝鮮佛敎改革論; RR: Joseon Bulgyo Hyeoksillon), was then expanded into The Correct Canon of Buddhism (Bulgyo Jeongjeon in 1943, just before his death. His successor, Cheongsan, published the new canon in 1962, The Scriptures of Won Buddhism (Wonbulgyo Gyojeon). All were written in Korean to be accessible to as many people as possible.

The Scriptures now also include the Dharma Discourses by the Second Head Dharma Master Cheongsan and eight traditional Mahayana works, e.g., the Diamond Sutra and Secrets on Cultivating the Mind by the Korean monk and scholar Jinul (1158–1210).

Prominent in every Won Buddhist temple is a large circle above the altar. This is Il Won Sang, the "One Circle Image".

In the words of Won Buddhism's fourth Head Dharma Master, "The reason the Buddha is respected and venerated is not his physical body. The reason is his enlightened mind." Il Won Sang is considered the symbol of the essence of the Buddha's mind, the Dharmakaya Buddha, representing

- The original source of all beings in the universe
- The mind-seal of all Buddhas and sages
- The original nature of all sentient beings

Won Buddhist teachings are summed up in a Doctrinal Chart printed at the front of The Scriptures of Won Buddhism:

Four Principles comprising the doctrine are:

- Awareness of Grace and Requital of Grace
- Right Enlightenment and Right Practice
- Selfless Service to the Public
- Practical Application of the Buddha-dharma

Down the center of the chart is an explanation of Il Won Sang and Master Sotaesan's Transmission Verse:

Being into nonbeing and nonbeing into being,
Turning and turning—in the ultimate,
Being and nonbeing are both void,
Yet this void is complete.

To the left and the right are two "Gateways" representing the paths of worship and practice: the Gateway of Faith, Based on Retribution and Response of Cause and Effect, and the Gateway of Practice, Based on True Void and Marvelous Existence.

The Gateway of Faith includes:

The Fourfold Grace: Won Buddhists express gratitude to the Fourfold Grace, or Four Beneficences defining what one cannot live without. These also reflect Confucian values in Won doctrine.

- Grace of Heaven-and-Earth
- Grace of Parents
- Grace of Fellow Beings
- Grace of Laws

Underlying the expression of gratitude for the Fourfold Grace lies engagement with, as opposed to detachment from, the world.

The Four Essentials: The second element of The Gateway of Faith consists of:

- Developing Self Power for fulfilling personal duties and responsibilities
- The Primacy of the Wise—Seeking teachers whose moral conduct, governance of human affairs, knowledge and scholarship, and common sense are superior to one's own
- Educating Others' Children, regardless of gender, class, or wealth, for the sake of advancing world civilization
- Venerating the Public Spirited—In keeping with the primary goal of serving others, actively engaging in public service

Requiting Grace is a Buddha Offering

- Everywhere a Buddha Image—All things in the universe are considered a transformation of the spirit of the Dharmakaya Buddha
- Every Act a Buddha Offering—Therefore, every act is the dharma (truth, reality) of buddha offerings

The Gateway of Practice includes:

The Threefold Study is taught as the means of cultivating unity with one's original nature, Il Won Sang

- Cultivating the Spirit—Right mindfulness and right meditation
- Inquiry into Human Affairs and Universal Principles—Right views and right thoughts, including preparation for clarity and ready judgment in everyday life
- Choice in Action—Right speech, right action, right livelihood, right effort

The Eight Articles

- The Threefold Study requires: Belief, Zeal, Questioning, Dedication; removal of Unbelief, Greed, Laziness, and Foolishness

Unremitting Seon in Action and Rest (seon 선, 禪)

- Timeless Seon, Placeless Seon—"When the six sense organs are free from activity, distracted thoughts and nurture the one mind." This ability is gained through meditation, with the goal of living in such a way as to see the Buddha in all things.

== New religion ==
There is disagreement among scholars whether Won Buddhism is a new religion or a reformation of mainstream Buddhist tradition. Even Won Buddhists describe their tradition both ways.

Characteristics shared with mainstream Mahayana Buddhist tradition include:

- Belief in karma and rebirth
- Belief in salvation through enlightenment to the truth that the world's problems are caused by and can be solved by our own minds
- Meditation practice, including core Seon teachings but not as central as in many traditional Buddhist practices
- The goal of saving all sentient beings from suffering

Characteristics distinguishing Won Buddhism include:

- Emphasis on doing beneficial work for others as well progressing internally through practice
- No claim by the Founding Master of Buddhist training or direct transmission of teachings
- Key concepts from non-Buddhist Korean traditions
- The core teaching that spiritual transformation should parallel developments in the material world
- The symbol of Il Won Sang (One Circle Image) vs. images of the Buddha (see also Aniconism in Buddhism)
- A universalist message that all religions are essentially one

== Current practice ==
Won Buddhist clerics—women and men—are called gyomunim (literally "someone devoted to the teaching"). Unlike traditional Buddhist monks, they do not shave their heads. The Prime Dharma Master is elected by the Supreme Dharma Council, consisting of senior and lay ministers who also are elected.

Gender equality is both a core doctrine and an organizing principle. Female gyomumin have the same status as their male counterparts. Women as well as men may be elected "masters" and sit on the Supreme Dharma Council, Won Buddhism's highest decision-making body.

In past years, a culture developed in which female gyomunim remained celibate and dressed in traditional clothing while celibacy remained optional for male gyomunim, who could also wear contemporary dress. This practice was deeply rooted in the patriarchal and hierarchical social structure of the time, which dictated that women should not wear clothing that emphasized their form. The founder of Won Buddhism recognized this form of discrimination against women and sought to abolish it. “Despite the fundamental principle of gender equality in Won Buddhism, the tradition of women wearing traditional clothing persisted, thereby maintaining a certain degree of separation between the sexes. This difference became a point of controversy within the community, and in recent times, female gyomunims have begun to adopt both traditional and modern clothing, reflecting a shift towards greater equality.

In 2019, the Supreme Dharma Council passed a resolution ensuring equal marriage access for all ministers, regardless of gender. This resolution carries significant weight and has influenced the practices and policies of the religion, furthering the founder’s vision of abolishing discrimination and promoting equality within the community.

The Won Buddhist order has formed schools and social welfare centers in Korea, and medical missions to other parts of the world. Supporting education is held especially important for the goal of increasing people's independent self-reliance. Sotaesan taught that "all religions are of one household although they have different names in accordance with the different times and districts of their foundation", and the importance of interfaith dialogue has been maintained by Head Dharma Masters since.

Temples offer weekly services, typically on Sundays. These can include meditation, hymns and chanting, and a dharma talk, similar to a sermon.

== See also ==
- Cheondojae § Won Buddhism
- Won Institute of Graduate Studies (Warminster, Pennsylvania, USA)
- Wonkwang University (Iksan, South Korea)
- Ambedkarite Buddhism
