= Community College of Philadelphia =

Public college of Philadelphia, Pennsylvania, US

Coordinates: 39.962883°N 75.166299°W

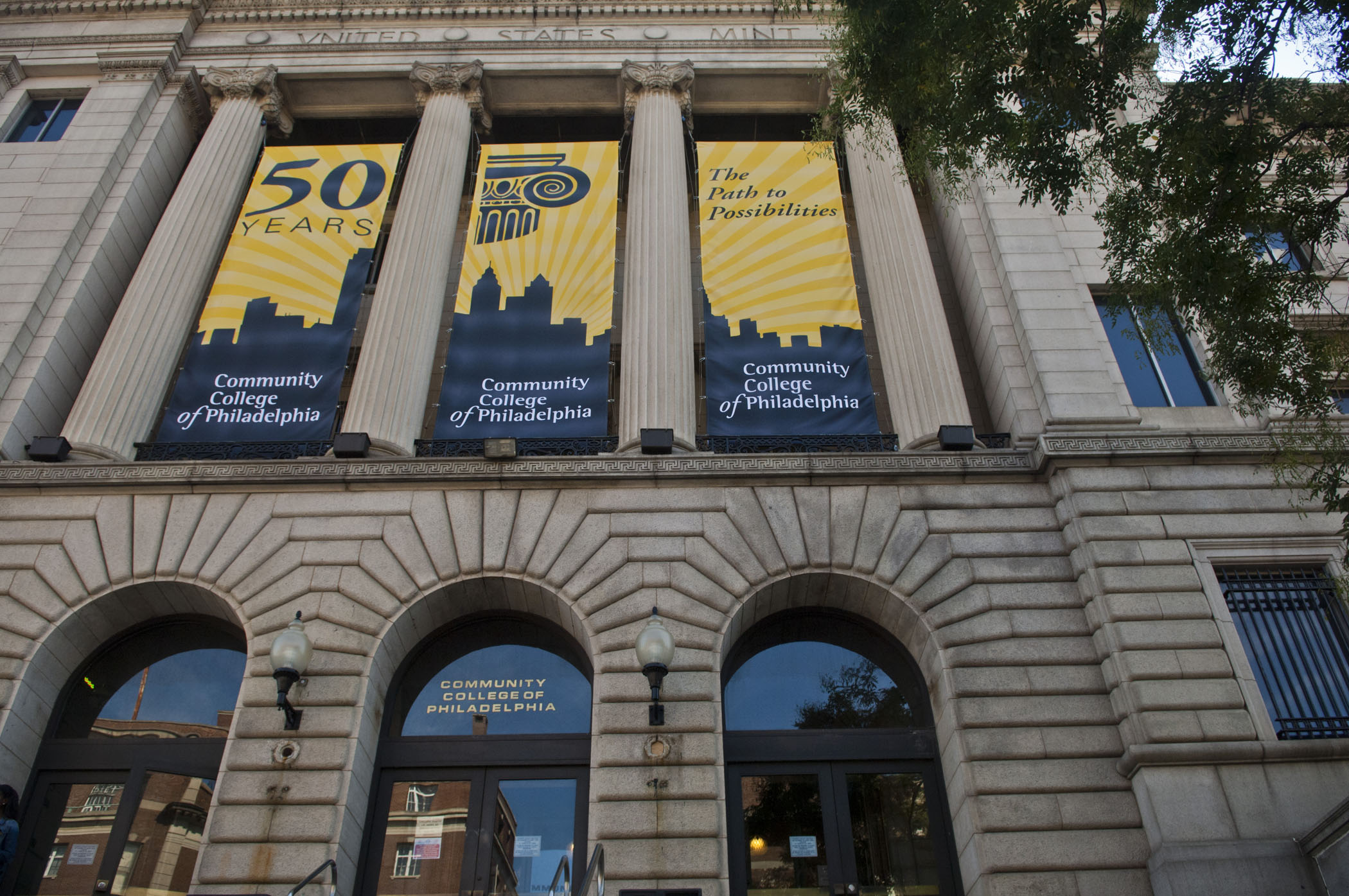
- The Community College of Philadelphia's Mint Building on Spring Garden Street in Philadelphia
- Motto: The Path to Possibilities.
- Type: Public Community College
- Established: 1965; 61 years ago
- Accreditation: Middle States Commission on Higher Education
- Endowment: $11.9 million
- President: Dr. Alycia A. Marshall, Ph.D.
- Faculty: 858
- Administrative staff: 464
- Students: 13,672
- Location: Philadelphia, Pennsylvania, United States
- Campus: Main campus Northeast Regional Center Career and Advanced Technology Center West Regional Center
- Newspaper: The Vanguard
- Colors: Yellow/gold, white and black
- Nickname: Lions
- Sporting affiliations: NJCAA; EPAC
- Mascot: Roary the lion
- Website: www.ccp.edu
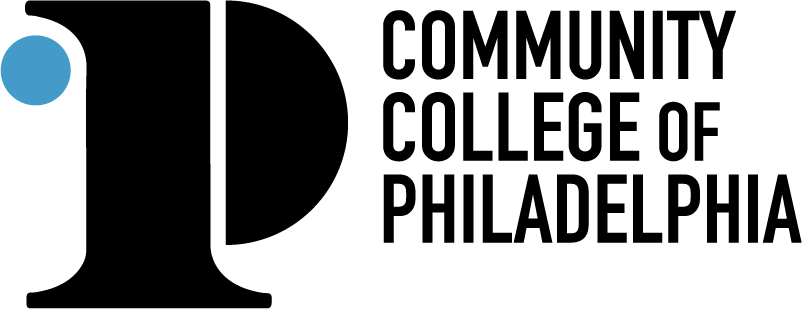

The Community College of Philadelphia (CCP) is a public community college with campuses throughout Philadelphia. The college was founded in 1965 and is accredited by the Middle States Commission on Higher Education. It offers over 100 associate degree and certificate programs through its four locations.

CCP's athletic teams compete in the Eastern Pennsylvania Athletic Conference (EPAC) of the National Junior College Athletic Association (NJCAA). They are collectively known as the Lions and have more than 50 championships as current members of the EPAC and members of the former Pennsylvania Collegiate Athletic Association.

== History ==
=== Early years ===
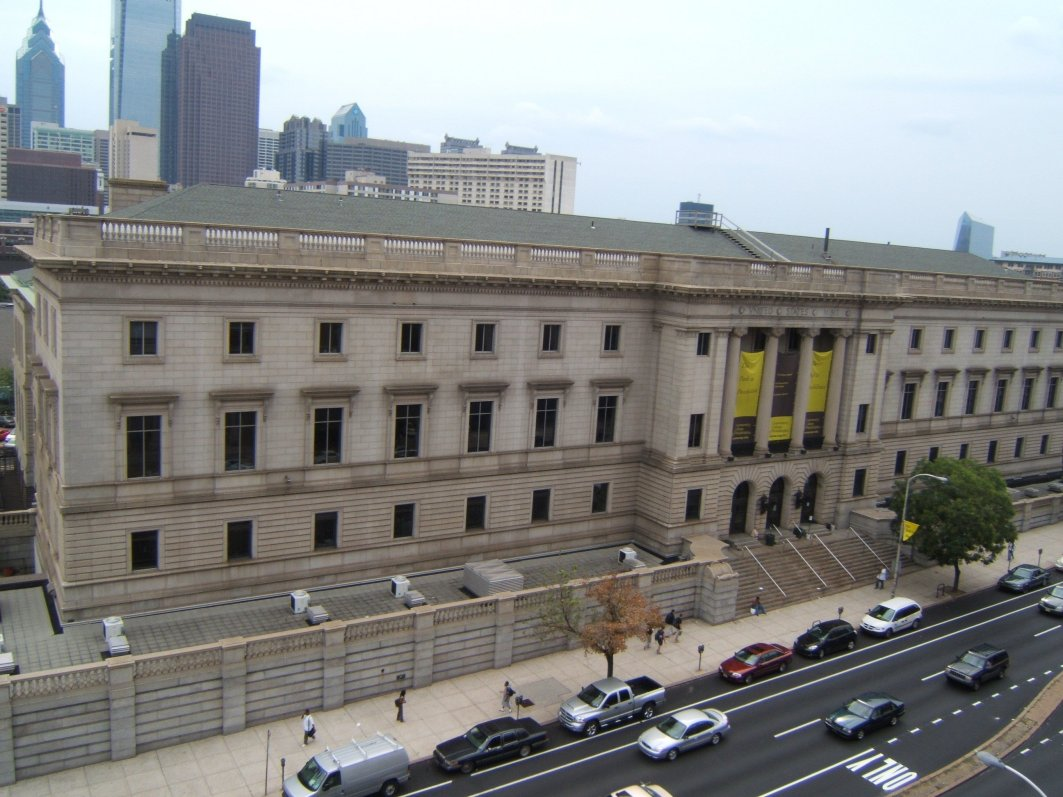
The Third Philadelphia Mint is now part of Community College of Philadelphia's main campus.

The Community College of Philadelphia was founded in 1965 as a means for the African American and low-income residents of Philadelphia to have access to higher education.

In 1962, the Philadelphia Commission on Higher Education presented their recommendations for the establishment of a community college in Philadelphia, and in 1964, the college was founded in accordance with Pennsylvania legislation. With Dr. Allen T. Bonnell presiding as CCP's first and founding president, classes commenced in September 1965 at the site of the former N. Snellenburg & Company department store on South 11th Street. Under Dr. Bonnell's leadership, enrollment at the college grew from an initial 1,200 to 4,365 students by 1967.

By 1969, it had reached 6,200. The majority of students entered the workforce upon completion of their programs, while others continued on to four-year institutions. The college initially offered courses in human services, business administration, health occupations and paraprofessional engineering.

By 1971, CCP had acquired the third Philadelphia Mint building (the Mint), located at 1700 Spring Garden Street. CCP began holding classes there in 1973 while continuing to hold classes at the 11th Street location. The construction of Main Campus (the Bonnell and West Buildings) began at 17th and Spring Garden Streets in 1979.

In 1983, CCP's $70 million Main Campus was fully constructed around the Mint, which had undergone renovations for new administrative and student facilities. In the spring of that year, CCP's 11th Street location was consolidated into the permanent Main Campus.

== Campus ==
The college has four locations that offer varying programs. Each location offers a learning commons, science laboratories, computer labs, enrollment services, advising, counseling, and a bookstore.

=== Main Campus ===
Main Campus is located at 1700 Spring Garden Street in the Spring Garden neighborhood of central Philadelphia. The campus covers 14 acres (0.057 km^{2}) and houses seven buildings: the Athletics Center, the Bonnell Building, the Center for Business and Industry, the Mint Building, the Pavilion Building, the West Building and the Winnet Student Life Building.

The Athletics Center is open to all CCP students, faculty and staff. Opened in 1991, it contains an aerobics/dance room, basketball court, racquetball courts, a table tennis room cardio room and a weight room.

The Bonnell Building, the first president's namesake, is the largest building on Main Campus. It houses student services and two auditoriums and connects to the Mint Building.

The 97,000 square foot (9,000 m^{2}) Center for Business and Industry opened in 2003 and offers high-tech classrooms, conference rooms and office spaces for technology and workforce development programs.

The Mint Building is centrally located on Main Campus. It was the third Philadelphia Mint building, but CCP acquired it and began holding classes there in 1973. It currently houses student services, security and a library.

The Pavilion Building is the newest facility on Main Campus and has ecofriendly features. The building opened in 2011 and is home to the Culinary Arts and Hospitality Management programs.

The West Building houses the allied health science and Gateway to College (alternative education) programs, among others. The facility is located at the southwest corner of 17th and Spring Garden streets and connects to the Pavilion Building.

The Winnet Student Life Building includes spaces for student support services, programs and activities.

=== Northeast Regional Center ===
The Northeast Regional Center is CCP's first and largest regional center. It was initially opened in 1985 at Academy and Red Lion Roads in the Morrell Park neighborhood of Northeast Philadelphia. In 1994, the campus's new location became 12901 Townsend Road in the Parkwood neighborhood of Northeast Philadelphia. The campus underwent renovations and an expansion project that were completed in 2010 and earned a Silver Leadership in Energy and Environmental Design (LEED) certification in 2013.

=== Northwest Regional Center ===
The Northwest Regional Center is located at 1300 West Godfrey Avenue in the Fern Rock neighborhood of North Philadelphia. The campus acquired the Pennsylvania College of Optometry at 1300 West Godfrey Avenue in 1998 and opened in 1999. The campus contains more than 30 classrooms and is the only location that offers the Ophthalmic Technician Proficiency Certificate program.

=== West Regional Center ===
The West Regional Center is located at 4725 Chestnut Street in the Walnut Hill neighborhood of West Philadelphia. It opened in 1992 and is three miles from Main Campus. It offers programs in two buildings that contain a combined 25 classrooms. As of 2021, the campus's Automotive Technology Center is undergoing construction and is scheduled to open as the Career and Advanced Technology Center in 2022. The expanded two-story facility will include an additional 15,000 square feet (1,400 m^{2}) of auto space, incorporate sustainable features and technologies and meet the criteria for LEED certification.

== Administration and organization ==
CCP operates under seven academic pathways: Business, Entrepreneurship & Law; Creative Arts; Design, Construction & Transportation; Education & Human Services; Health Care; Liberal Arts and Communications; and Science & Technology.

A typical academic year is broken up into two 15-week terms during the fall (September–December) and spring (January–April). Within the full terms are sessions that span 10 weeks and two accelerated seven-week terms each fall and spring. The full summer term is 13–14 weeks long (May–August) and contains two accelerated terms that each span six to seven weeks. An academic year begins on the first day of the fall term and ends on the last day of the summer term.

CCP's endowment had a market value of approximately $11.9 million in the fiscal year that ended in 2019.

== Academics and programs ==
CCP has an open admissions policy and accepts life experience as credits. The college partners with local high schools to offer alternative education programs, college application support and college credit courses to high school students. In addition to its associate and certificate degree programs, CCP offers non-credit enrichment, job training and certification courses through its Continuing Professional Education and Career Training program.

CCP has dual admissions, core-to-core and program-to-program transfer agreements with more than 30 four-year institutions in Pennsylvania. The agreements allow students to automatically transfer after completing an associate degree at CCP.

CCP's I Am More program supports formerly incarcerated students with their completion of a CCP certificate or degree program.

The Office of Collegiate Recovery supports students with their completion of a CCP certificate or degree program through recovery services.

CCP is a KEYS (Keystone Education Yields Success) program participant. The government-funded program helps students who are Temporary Assistance for Needy Families (TANF) and/or Supplemental Nutrition Assistance Program (SNAP) recipients achieve their career and economic goals.

== Student life ==
=== Student body ===
As of fall 2020, CCP's student body consists of 13,672 students. There are 31 percent full time and 69 percent part time students.

Demographics of student body in fall 2020
	Full and Part Time Students	U.S. Census (Note: People who identify as Hispanic/Latino are included in applicable race categories.)
International	3%	N/A
Multiracial American	3%	2.8%
Black/African American	41%	13.4%
American Indian and Alaska Native	0%	1.3%
Asian	10%	5.9%
Non-Hispanic White American	23%	60.1%
Hispanic/Latino American	16%	18.5%
Native Hawaiian and Other Pacific Islander	0%	0.2%
Other/Unknown	4%	N/A

=== Organizations ===
More than 30 student clubs and organizations operate at CCP, including student government, special interest and service organizations. Student clubs are required to register and reactivate each year.

Cultural groups on campus include: African Culture and Traditions Club, Asian American Association, Christian Women Alliance, Gay Straight Alliance, Gospel Choir, Haitian Student Organization (Club Creole), International Student Organization, LASO (Latin American Student Organization), Muslim Student Association, Muslim Women League and Ritmo Latino Club.

=== Publications ===
The Vanguard, CCP's independent, award-winning, student-run newspaper, circulates print and digital editions, which are available via its website and social media platforms.

=== Athletics ===
The CCP athletic teams, formerly known as the Colonials, are collectively known as the Lions. The transition was caused by a Main Campus student petition in 2016, which led to a collegewide vote to choose a new mascot. According to an article by The Philadelphia Inquirer, CCP's mascot needed to reflect “inclusion, diversity, and strength,” and in 2019, Roary the lion officially became CCP's new mascot.

The CCP athletic association chairs seven varsity athletic programs, which are open to full time students. The Lions belong to the Eastern Pennsylvania Athletic Conference (EPAC) and Region 19 of the NJCAA. Men's sports include: basketball, cross country and track & field. Women's sports include: basketball, cross country, track & field and volleyball.

The Lions became nationally affiliated with the NJCAA in summer 2013. Previously, they were members of the former Eastern Pennsylvania Collegiate Conference (EPCC) and Pennsylvania Collegiate Athletic Association (PCAA).

CCP's teams have won four EPAC championships in men’s basketball (2015, 2016, 2018 and 2020) and two in women's basketball (2019 and 2020).

== Notable alumni ==
- Mary Enoch Elizabeth Baxter, American multimedia artist and activist
- Vanessa L. Brown, Democratic member of the Pennsylvania House of Representatives who was convicted of bribery.
- Dwight Evans, U.S. Congressman from Pennsylvania's 3rd congressional district
- Chaka Fattah, Former United States representative for Pennsylvania's 2nd congressional district who was convicted of a slew of charges in June 2016, including racketeering, conspiracy, bribery, bank fraud, mail fraud, and money laundering.
- Kevin Hart, American stand-up comedian and actor.
- Michael Horsey, Former member of the Pennsylvania House of Representatives.
- Joe Rocks, Member of the Pennsylvania House of Representatives for the 199th district from 1979 to 1980. Member of the Pennsylvania State Senate for the 4th district from 1981 to 1990.
- Ollie Johnson, former NBA player and director of athletics at CCP (attended but did not graduate from CCP)
- Melody Gardot, American jazz singer/songwriter

== See also ==
- List of colleges and universities in Philadelphia
