= The Restaurant School at Walnut Hill College =

Private college in Philadelphia, Pennsylvania, US

Coordinates: 39.955°N 75.2076°W

Walnut Hill College (formerly The Restaurant School)
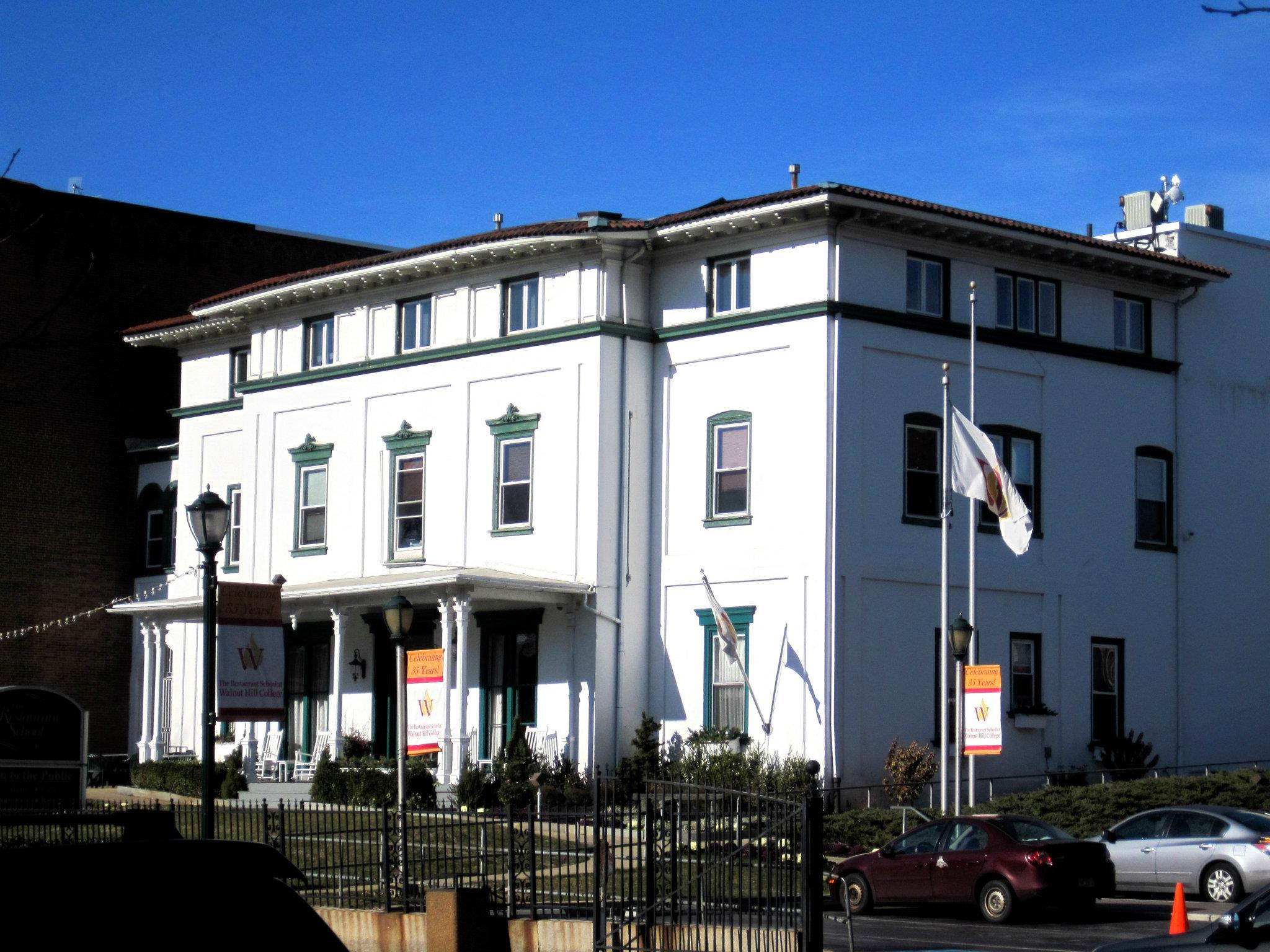
- Allison Mansion on the Walnut Hill College campus
- Type: Private for-profit culinary school
- Established: 1974; 52 years ago
- President: Daniel Liberatoscioli
- Location: Philadelphia, Pennsylvania, U.S.
- Campus: Urban
- Website: www.walnuthillcollege.edu

Walnut Hill College, formerly The Restaurant School, is a private college focused on fine dining and luxury hospitality that offers degrees in culinary arts, pastry arts, restaurant management, and hotel management. The campus is located in the University City section of Philadelphia.

== Academics ==
The college offers four majors: Culinary Arts, Restaurant Management, Pastry Arts, and Hotel Management. The majors are offered at the Associate's and Bachelor's degree levels.

All Culinary and Pastry students in the associate degree participate in a week-long gastronomic tour of France. Restaurant and Hotel Management students participate in a week-long hospitality tour that includes behind-the-scenes tours of Walt Disney World Resort and other central Florida resorts followed by a cruise to the Bahamas. Students who continue their studies towards a bachelor's degree participate in a week-long "Hospitality Tour" of England.

The school is accredited by the Accrediting Commission of Career Schools and Colleges, which is oriented toward vocational programs.
