= ASPIRA City College =

College in Philadelphia, Pennsylvania, US

Coordinates: 40.01746°N 75.13496°W

- Type: Public Educational Institution, Not-for-profit
- Established: May 22, 1974
- Location: Philadelphia, Pennsylvania, U.S.
- Website: www.aspiracitycollege.edu

ASPIRA City College, formerly WFI City College, is a nonprofit career college in Philadelphia, Pennsylvania, United States. The college is owned by the Public Health Management Corporation (PHMC) and is incorporated in Pennsylvania.

== Academics ==
ASPIRA City College teaches occupation-specific skills in addition to the applied general education for the workplace. The curriculum integrates instruction with hands-on skill development and practical experience gained through career-specific supervised externships. It educates the students for High-Priority Occupations.

ASPIRA City College is licensed by the Pennsylvania Department of Education Board of Private Licensed Schools and is accredited by The Accrediting Commission of Career Schools and Colleges (ACCSC). It is authorized to award Associate in Specialized Technology (AST) Degrees for completion of its Computer Support Specialist Programs as well as a Post-Secondary Diploma for successful completion of its Medical Office Assistant Program.

== History ==
The WFI City College was incorporated in Pennsylvania on May 22, 1974, as the Metropolitan Collegiate Center of Germantown initiating operations under the DBA name of ACT Business Academy. The organization was founded by members of the First United Methodist Church of Germantown. At its inception, it provided short-term job readiness training to disadvantaged youth in the Germantown community of Philadelphia.

The nonprofit was first licensed as a private career school by the Pennsylvania Department of Education State Board of Private Licensed Schools on August 13, 1987, continuing under the DBA name, ACT Business Academy. The college was then approved to provide its Basic Office Skills Program to private paying students and award graduates a Post-Secondary Diploma. On August 7, 1992, ACT Business Academy was granted a legal name change to Metropolitan Career Center.

In February 1994, the school earned national accreditation from the Accrediting Commission of Career Schools and Colleges (ACCSC) under the name of Metropolitan Career Center. In 1997, State Board of Private Licensed Schools approved the school's curricula for a Computer Software and Hardware Program. Then in 1998, ACCSC approved the school to award an Associate in Specialized Technology (AST) Degree to students who completed either of these programs, then titled, Computer Technician – Software, and Computer Technician – Hardware. The Pennsylvania State Board of Private Licensed Schools approved the Web Design Program on August 16, 2001.

In 2012, the Public Health Management Corporation (PHMC) purchased MCC/CTI and began operating it under the name, The Workforce Institute's City College. It is located at 4322 North 5th Street in the Hunting Park section of North Philadelphia.

ASPIRA City College complies with Title VI of the Civil Rights Act of 1964, Title IX of the Education Amendments of 1972, Section 504 of the Rehabilitation Act of 1973, The Equal Credit Opportunity Act (Discrimination in Lending) and The Age Discrimination Act of 1975.
