= Won Institute of Graduate Studies =

American school in Pennsylvania

Coordinates: 40.09927°N 75.15431°W

- Motto: Personal Development. Professional Achievement.
- Type: Private graduate school
- Established: 2001
- Religious affiliation: Won Buddhism
- President: Wonsun Oh, Ph.D.
- Students: 92 (Fall 2022)
- Location: Warminster, Pennsylvania, United States
- Website: www.woninstitute.edu

The Won Institute of Graduate Studies is a Private graduate school founded by members of the Korean Won Buddhist order and located in Warminster, Pennsylvania. The Won Institute of Graduate Studies is the only educational center for Won Buddhist Studies recognized by the Won Buddhist order outside of South Korea.

It offers a certificate program and master's program in Won Buddhist Studies. The school also offers professional doctorate, master's, and certificate programs in acupuncture and Chinese herbal medicine. The institute maintains on-site acupuncture clinics and a Chinese herbal medicine clinic. It is accredited by the Middle States Commission on Higher Education and the Accreditation Commission for Acupuncture and Herbal Medicine.

== History ==
In 1993, the third head dharma master Daesan talked to senior disciples regarding starting an educational institute in the United States. In 1999, the development team of Won Institute submitted its first application to the Pennsylvania Department for Education for Won Buddhist Studies. In 2001, Won Institute of Graduate Studies received final approval from the township zoning hearing board for Glenside location and the location was purchased.

In 2002, Won Institute of Graduate Studies opened its doors. 2004 marked the first graduating class of four students – one Applied Meditation and three Won Buddhist Studies. As a discipline, acupuncture was added in 2005 and Chinese herbal medicine was added in 2011.
