= Antonelli College =

Coordinates: 39°06′16″N 84°30′39″W

- Type: For-profit
- Established: 1947
- Location: Cincinnati, Ohio, United States
- Website: http://www.antonellicollege.edu/

Antonelli College was a for-profit career training school with a main campus located in Cincinnati. Founded in 1947 as the Gebhardt Art School, the college later switched its name to Ohio Visual Art Institute in the mid-1970s then renaming itself to Antonelli College in 1982. In 2016, Antonelli College was ranked one of the top ten most expensive two-year colleges in Ohio

== Accreditation ==
Antonelli College was accredited by the Accrediting Commission of Career Schools and Colleges (ACCSC).

== History ==
In 1947, the school opened its doors as the Gebhardt Art School. In the mid-1970s, the college was renamed the Ohio Visual Art Institute until 1982 when it became Antonelli College.

In the 1990s, degree programs were added in business office technology, and in January 2005, programs in the health information technology field as well as massage therapy were added. Branches in Jackson and Hattiesburg, Mississippi, were added in January 1996, and in 2009, the West Chester, Ohio, branch became the newest addition to the Antonelli College family. In 2008, an online option was also created for distance learners.

The founding campus was located in Cincinnati, in the urban downtown area.

March 2016, Antonelli College's Practical Nursing Program at the Cincinnati campus was suspended by the Ohio Board of Nursing.

In March 2019, Antonelli College indicated that it planned to close all of its campuses.

== Campuses ==
- Cincinnati
- Hattiesburg, Mississippi (planned to close)
- Jackson, Mississippi (planned to close)
- Online
