= Triangle Tech =

For-profit technical school system in Pennsylvania, U.S.

Coordinates: 40.46211°N 80.01224°W

Triangle Tech was a for-profit system of technical schools with multiple locations in Pennsylvania. It offered 16-month programs for an Associate in Specialized Technology Degree in various technologies. Triangle Tech was founded in Pittsburgh in 1944 and expanded to six locations across Pennsylvania, including Greensburg, DuBois, Sunbury, Chambersburg, and Bethlehem. The school was licensed by the State Board of Private Licensed Schools and the Pennsylvania Department of Education and was accredited by the Accrediting Commission of Career Schools and Colleges. In June 2024, the system of schools announced that it would close. All students who were able to graduate by June 2025 had the option to do so.
