= Douglas Education Center =

Coordinates: 40.16155°N 79.88842°W

- Motto: It's Your Future... OWN IT.
- Type: Private for-profit college
- Established: 1904
- President: Jeffery D. Imbrescia
- Location: Monessen, Pennsylvania, United States
- Colors: Red and Black
- Website: dec.edu

Douglas Education Center (DEC) is a Private for-profit college in Monessen, Pennsylvania.

== History ==
Warren Douglas founded the Douglas Business College in 1904 as a business and secretary school. In 1977, it became the Douglas School of Business. In 2001, it became the Douglas Education Center.

== Admissions ==
Douglas Education Center grants admission to individuals who have successfully earned a high school diploma or a GED high school equivalency. It accepts applications year round.

== Academics ==
Douglas Education Center offers specialized business degrees, diplomas and certificates in various fields. Below is a breakdown of the programs offered. In addition to programs in the health sciences, cosmetology, and skilled trades, the center offers the following specialized programs:

- Tom Savini's Special Make-Up Effects Program: Formed in 2000, Tom Savini's Special Make-Up Effects Program is a sixteen-month Associate in Specialized Business Degree Program. Special effects artist Tom Savini developed this program.
- George A. Romero's Filmmaking Program: Founded in 2008 under the name The Factory Digital Filmmaking Program at Douglas, George A. Romero's Filmmaking Program is a sixteen-month Associate in Specialized Business Degree Program.

The institution is accredited by the Accrediting Commission of Career Schools and Colleges.
