= Bradford School (Pittsburgh) =

Former for-profit college in Pittsburgh, Pennsylvania

Coordinates: 40.433040°N 80.004573°W

- Pittsburgh, Pennsylvania; United States

Information
- Type: Private for-profit college
- President: Vincent Graziano
- Accreditation: Accrediting Commission of Career Schools and Colleges
- Programs: Business, Technology and Health Care
- Website: www.bradfordpittsburgh.edu

Bradford School was a private for-profit college in Pittsburgh, Pennsylvania. Bradford awarded both diplomas and specialized associate degrees.

After 50 years of operations, Bradford School announced that it would no longer enroll new students as of June 2018 at its Pittsburgh location due to declining enrollment and changes to the area that impacted operations. Career Services for graduates and alumni ceased April 30, 2019.

== Student body, admissions, and outcomes ==
According to Peterson’s and recent institutional publications, Bradford School had an undergraduate population of 387. For the most recent year, 68% of entering students graduated and 86% of all graduates were placed in jobs.

== Academics ==
Bradford grouped its twelve major areas of study into three main categories: Business, Technology, and Health Care.

== Accreditation ==
Bradford School was accredited by the Accrediting Commission of Career Schools and Colleges to award diplomas and associate degrees. The Medical Assisting Program was accredited by the Commission on Accreditation of Allied Health Education Programs (CAAHEP). The Dental Assisting program is accredited by the Commission on Dental Accreditation of the American Dental Association.
