= Orleans Technical College =

Private technical college in Philadelphia, Pennsylvania

Coordinates: 40.0905°N 75.0115°W

Orleans Technical College (formerly Orleans Technical Institute) is a private technical school in Philadelphia, Pennsylvania. It is operated by the JEVS Human Services agency and has been in operation since 1974.
