= Pittsburgh Technical College =

Private college in Pittsburgh, Pennsylvania

Coordinates: 40.42470°N 80.18873°W

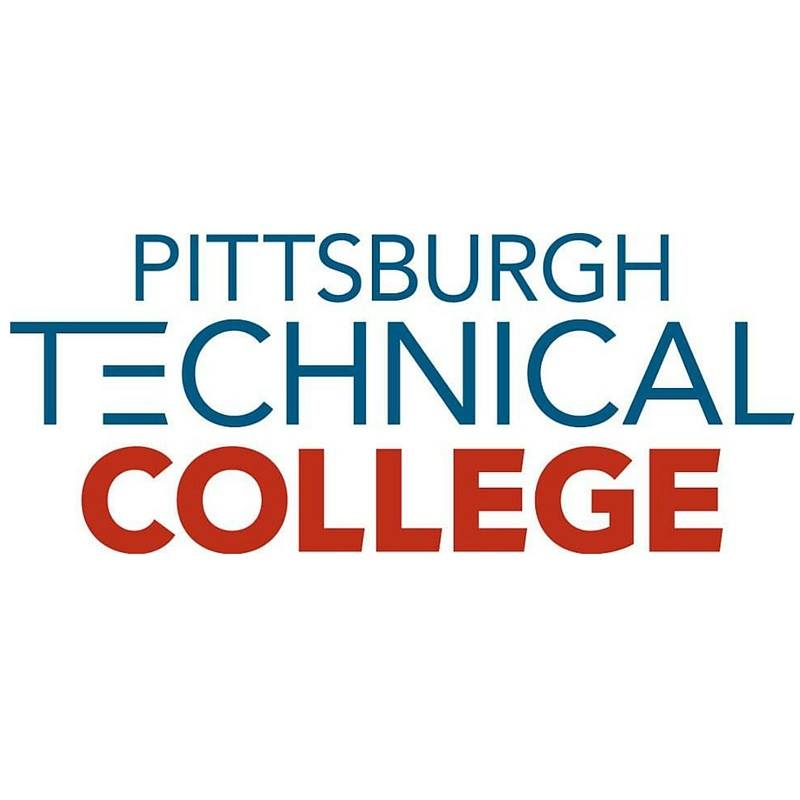
- Former name: Pittsburgh Technical Institute
- Type: Private college
- Active: 1946–2024
- Location: Oakdale, Pennsylvania, United States
- Website: www.ptcollege.edu

Pittsburgh Technical College (PTC) was a private college in Pittsburgh, Pennsylvania. The college, formerly Pittsburgh Technical Institute, which opened in 1946 and closed in 2024, had more than 30 career-focused programs in ten schools. Bachelor's and associate degrees are awarded, in addition to certificate programs.

Previously an employee-owned for-profit school, PTC became nonprofit in 2017 when it was purchased by the Center for Educational Excellence, Inc. Following the resignation of several trustees in late 2023, an investigation by the state attorney general, and an official expression of concern from the college's accreditor, the college began the process of closing with a planned closure by July 31, 2024.

== Closure ==
Following months of controversy and media scrutiny over the leadership of the college's president, Alicia Harvey-Smith, several members of PTC's board of trustees resigned en masse in October 2023.

In May 2024, it was reported by WPXI that the Pennsylvania Attorney General's Office had launched an active investigation into PTC spending and financial management. This comes after additional high level employees have recently resigned due to concerns of the school's current financial situation. The following month, the college's accreditor, the Middle States Commission on Higher Education, warned the college because it was "in danger of imminent closure". This followed a previous demand from the accreditor that the college submit a teach out plan; the commission found the submitted plan was unacceptable.

On June 10, 2024, the college's board of trustees announced that the college would officially shut down on August 9, 2024. However, students were required to leave on-campus housing and most employees were laid off effective June 30, 2024.

== Campus ==
There are five buildings on campus, including a six-story, main facility where students attended most of their classes. The Trades and Technology Center housed the School of Trades Technology and Energy and Electronics Technology programs. The main building features classrooms on all floors, labs, the PTC Café on the fourth level, a large gallery and meeting place on the fifth floor, professional kitchens on the sixth floor for culinary students, lounge areas, and a library.

== Housing ==
Approximately 51% of the student population lived in school-sponsored, apartment-style housing on the campus.

== Accreditation ==
Pittsburgh Technical College is accredited by Middle States Commission on Higher Education. It is also authorized by the Pennsylvania Department of Education to award Academic Associate in Science degrees and Bachelor of Science degrees.

Programs at Pittsburgh Technical College have earned and maintain the following specialized accreditations and recognitions from accrediting bodies:

- Surgical Technology and Medical Assisting programs are accredited by the Commission on Accreditation of Allied Health Education Programs (CAAHEP).
- Practical Nursing program is accredited by the Accreditation Commission for Education in Nursing.
- Practical Nursing and Associate in Science Nursing programs are approved by the Pennsylvania State Board of Nursing.
- Associate in Science degree and Certificate program in Culinary Arts are accredited by the American Culinary Federation (ACF).
