= New Castle School of Trades =

Private technical school in Ohio and Pennsylvania, US

Coordinates: 41.0352°N 80.4014°W

- Type: Trade school
- Established: 1945
- Location: New Castle, Pennsylvania; East Liverpool, Ohio, United States
- Campus: Suburban
- Website: www.ncstrades.edu

New Castle School of Trades (NCST) is a private for-profit technical school in New Castle, Pennsylvania and East Liverpool, Ohio. It is accredited by the Accrediting Commission of Career Schools and Colleges of Technology.

== History ==
The New Castle School of Trades was founded in 1945 to train its students in skilled trades.

In 1973, NCST earned accreditation from the Accrediting Commission of the National Association of Trade and Technical Schools. Nine years later, in 1982, NCST was approved to award the associate degrees in Specialized Technology by the Pennsylvania Department of Education.

In 2011, NCST acquired a second location in New Castle, Pennsylvania. The previous location is still in use. NCST opened its campus in East Liverpool in 2016.
