= Montgomery County Community College =

Public college in Montgomery County, Pennsylvania, US

Coordinates: 40.1737°N 75.2757°W

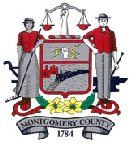
- Motto: Montco Momentum
- Type: Public community college
- Established: 1964; 62 years ago
- Academic affiliations: Space-grant
- Endowment: $1.2 million
- President: Victoria Bastecki-Perez
- Faculty: 181 full-time; 574 part-time
- Students: 12,805
- Undergraduates: 12,805
- Location: Blue Bell, Pennsylvania, United States
- Campus: Blue Bell (Blue Bell Campus) Pottstown(Pottstown Campus)
- Colors: Montco Red & Grey
- Nickname: Mustangs
- Sporting affiliations: NJCAA - Eastern Pennsylvania Collegiate Conference; PCAA
- Mascot: Mustang
- Website: www.mc3.edu
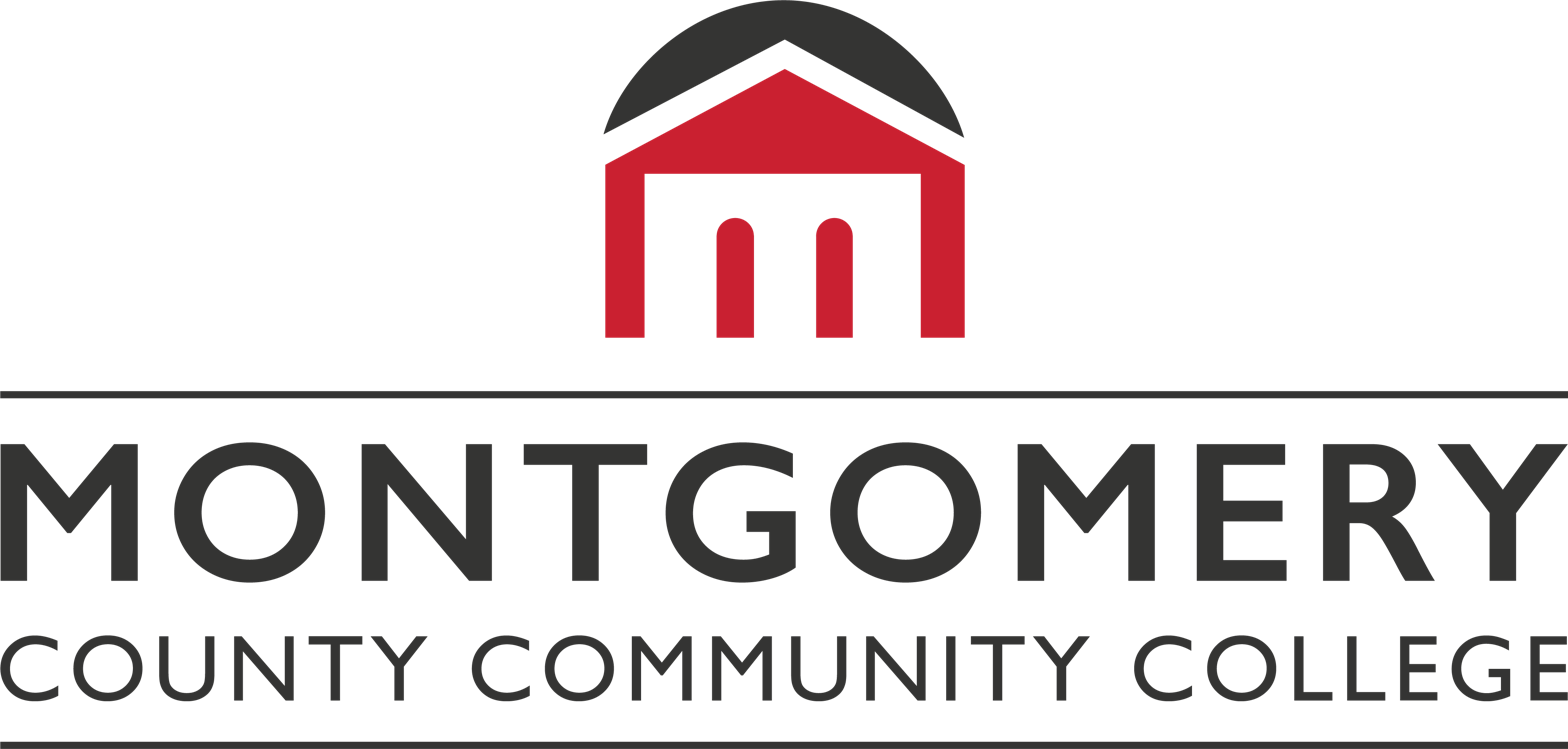

Montgomery County Community College (MCCC or Montco) is a public community college with campuses in Blue Bell and Pottstown in Montgomery County, Pennsylvania, and online. It is accredited by the Middle States Commission on Higher Education. Forbes ranked MCCC as one of Pennsylvania's top employers in 2019.

== History ==
The college was founded in 1964 and offered classes from its campus in Conshohocken. In 1972, the school relocated to its current location in Blue Bell, and in 1996, it opened its Pottstown Campus (formerly known as West Campus).

== Locations ==
=== Blue Bell Campus ===
Located on 186 acres. Construction is underway for a new Hospitality Institute, scheduled to open in fall 2024.

=== Pottstown Campus ===
The Pottstown Campus includes the North Hall, a facility with classrooms and an art gallery. The building was formerly a knitting mill, brewery, and shoe polish factory until its renovation in 2006. It is connected to South Hall by an underpass that had been filled in since the early 1920s. In 2022, the College opened a Challenger Learning Center at Montco Pottstown, the first of its kind in Pennsylvania

=== Municipal Police Academy ===
Located in Blue Bell, the Municipal Police Academy is licensed by the Commonwealth of Pennsylvania.

== Notable alumni ==
- Alexis Cohen, American Idol contestant
- Kylie Kelce, podcaster and media personality
