= Ana Uribe =

Arts and Culture

External videos
- Entre Nosotros: María Luisa Ortega Hernández talks to Colombian landscape painter Ana Lucía Uribe Villegas (In Spanish)
- Ana Uribe - Diamond St. Mural, Laurence Salzmann
- “Ana Uribe - Magic Wall Mural”, Opening, November 15, 2005
- “El Rayo”, Laurence Salzmann (2010)

Ana Uribe is a muralist and painter originally from Colombia, who lives and works in Philadelphia, Pennsylvania. She has created multiple murals as part of the Philadelphia Mural Arts Program, many of them in poorer neighborhoods of Philadelphia.

== Biography ==
Born in Colombia, Uribe grew up in Medellín, Colombia. She took lessons in painting from Mariela Ochoa and Libe de Zulategüi. After studying architecture at Universidad Pontificia Bolivariana, she moved to Philadelphia in 1973 to attend Moore College of Art and Design in the United States. After she graduated in 1977, Uribe spent time in the Andes.

Uribe painted a mural, "Sunflowers, a Tribute to Aimee Willard," in Hope Garden Park in Philadelphia, Pennsylvania in 1999. It is part of the City of Philadelphia Mural Arts Program. Another mural, on Fifth and Berks streets in Philadelphia is Tropical Landscape With Waterfall (1999). The mural includes a large waterfall, at the request of the community, who wanted the flowing water "to show how things were going to be cleaned up and get better."

Also in 1999, she exhibited "Tangled Paint" at the Salon des Amis Gallery. The Philadelphia Inquirer wrote that the pictures in the show together had "vigor, with an expressionist style as the vehicle for strong emotions and emphatic statements."

In 2006, The Philadelphia Inquirer listed her mural, Magic Wall (2006) as number three in a list of the city's best murals.

Also in 2006, she collaborated with disabled consumers of JEVS Human Services in the Germantown neighborhood of Philadelphia to paint a mural titled "Ability to Fly", inspired by the style of Marc Chagall. The building where this mural was painted was destroyed by arson in 2009. In an interview for the Community College of Philadelphia, Uribe explains in Spanish that some of her mural art works have not survived due to fire or demolition.

Uribe's mural, The Palm Tree, received a prize from the Philadelphia Green program, and is based on a garden located in Medellín.

Uribe was included with four other artists in the group show Colombians: Between Emotion, Nation and Imagination, at the Cambridge Multicultural Arts Center, curated by Shaari Neretin and Angela Perez Mejia in 2001 with the support of the David Rockefeller Center for Latin American Studies and the Colombian Consulate in Boston. In 2011, she was part of The Women of Lancaster Avenue, a curated exhibition that was part of the public art project LOOK! on Lancaster Avenue, sponsored by Drexel University. In October 2016 she exhibited her work as part of the Chestnut Hill Fall for the Arts Festival.

Ana Uribe's return visit to her native region of Antioquia Colombia was recorded in the 2010 documentary "El Rayo (The Ray)" by Laurence Salzmann.
