= Harijanto Setiawan =

Indonesian floral designer

- Born: Indonesia
- Occupations: Floral designer, architect
- Years active: 2002–present
- Organization: Boenga
- Known for: Structural floral art, "Haribana" style
- Notable work: Floral Kaleidoscope (2012), Florid Electron (2023)
- Title: International Master Florist
- Awards: Singapore President's Design Award (2013); Singapore Garden Festival Gold & Best of Show (2012); RHS Chelsea Flower Show Silver-Gilt Medal (2013); PHS Philadelphia Flower Show Gold & Best in Show (2023)
- Website: harijantosetiawan.com

Harijanto Setiawan is an Indonesian-born floral designer and permanent resident of Singapore. In 2013, he became the first floral designer to receive the President's Design Award Singapore.

== Early life and education ==
Setiawan was raised in Central Java, where he developed an early interest in floral design. He moved to Bandung to pursue higher education, earning a bachelor's degree in architecture from Parahyangan Catholic University.

In 1997, he completed a Master of Real Estate degree at the University of New South Wales in Australia. He received the title of International Master Florist in 2023 after specialised training at the Boerma Instituut Flower School in the Netherlands.

== Career ==
After graduation, Setiawan worked for seven years as a Technical Associate in the Changi Airport Development department of the former Singapore Public Works Department (PWD, now known as Singapore CPG Corporation), focusing on airport terminal expansions.

He transitioned from architecture to floristry by founding the Singapore-based floral design studio Boenga Pte Ltd; sources conflict on whether the studio was established in 2002 or 2004. From 2013 to 2015, Setiawan served as the president of the Floral Designers Society Singapore (FDSS).

His international industry involvement includes serving as an ambassador for the UK-based platform Floral Fundamentals and working as a tutor at the Interflora World Cup 2023 in Manchester. Setiawan also authored three books: Mystical Floral Journey, WTF! What The Flowers, and Haribana.

Setiawan frequently serves as a judge for international floral design competitions. He was a jury member for the "Floral Windows to the World" category at the Singapore Garden Festival in 2016, 2018, 2024, and 2026. Additionally, he served as the lead floral judge for the Philadelphia Flower Show in 2026.

== Awards and achievements ==
Setiawan has received multiple honours for his floral work, including being named "Designer of the Year" at the 2013 President's Design Award in Singapore.

=== Singapore Garden Festival (2012) ===
Setiawan took part in the fourth biennial Singapore Garden Festival held at Suntec Singapore. His design, named "Floral Kaleidoscope", was exhibited in the "Floral Windows to the World" competitive category, earning both the Gold Award and the Best of Show distinction. The design integrated flowers with lighting, structural geometry, and music. The installation featured a window display that used a sequence of mirrors to reflect an illuminated floral arrangement suspended from the ceiling, mimicking the optical effects of a kaleidoscope.

=== President's Design Award (2013) ===
In December 2013, Setiawan received the "Designer of the Year" accolade from the DesignSingapore Council and the Urban Redevelopment Authority. He was the first floral designer in Singapore to receive this honour, which is typically awarded to architects, urban planners, and industrial designers.

The official jury citation noted that his architectural background allowed him to approach floral design with a focus on spatial volume, scale, and structure.

=== RHS Chelsea Flower Show (2013) ===
In May 2013, Setiawan made his competitive debut at the Royal Horticultural Society (RHS) Chelsea Flower Show in London, United Kingdom. Competing in the "Floral Arrangement Awards" category, his entry received the Silver-Gilt Flora prize.

=== Philadelphia Flower Show (2023) ===
In March 2023, Setiawan competed in the Pennsylvania Horticultural Society (PHS) Philadelphia Flower Show, which operated under the theme "The Garden Electric". His entry, named "Florid Electron", explored the use of night environments and multimedia lighting elements in structural floral design. The installation featured pink and orange lilies alongside Venus flytraps, and won both a gold medal and the "Best in Show – Floral" title in the floral design division.

=== Other honours ===
- In the International Floral Art 2010/2011 competition in Belgium, Setiawan received the Silver Leaf Award for his installation, "Stairway to Heaven".
- He was named the 2015 International Designer of the Year by Fusion Flowers magazine.
- At the 2017 Community Garden Festival, he constructed a 3-metre-tall, 200-kilogram display of a Crimson Sunbird crafted entirely from edible fruits and vegetables (including chilies, paprika, long beans, tomatoes, carrots, passion fruit, and grapes).

== Design philosophy and style ==
Setiawan's floral design work is influenced by his background in architecture, incorporating structural and geometric elements into large-scale installations.

During the COVID-19 pandemic, Setiawan began conducting online floral arrangement classes, where he introduced a style combining architectural frameworks with elements of Japanese Ikebana. Blending his first name with the term "ikebana", he named this methodology "Haribana". The technique was detailed in his 2023 book of the same name, published by Stichting Kunstboek.

== Publications ==
- A Mystical Floral Journey (2016) OCLC 961834231
- WTF! What The Flowers (2018) ISBN 978-0-692-15143-3
- Haribana (2023), Stichting Kunstboek. ISBN 978-90-5856-684-3 OCLC 1302176551
