= Ben Stahl =

Ben Stahl may refer to:

- Ben Stahl (activist)
- Ben Stahl (artist)
