= Alvin Bronstein =

American lawyer (1928–2015)

Alvin J. Bronstein
- Born: June 8, 1928; New York City, U.S.
- Died: October 24, 2015 (aged 87); Centreville, Maryland, U.S.
- Occupations: Lawyer; prisoners' rights advocate
- Known for: Founder and Director Emeritus of the National Prison Project of the American Civil Liberties Union Foundation;

Academic background
- Education: New York Law School

Alvin J. Bronstein (June 8, 1928 – October 24, 2015) was an American lawyer, and founder and Director Emeritus of the National Prison Project of the American Civil Liberties Union Foundation. According to his ACLU biography, 'he has argued numerous prisoners’ rights cases in federal trial and appellate courts as well as the Supreme Court of the United States. He was a consultant to state and federal correctional agencies, appeared as an expert witness on numerous occasions and has edited or authored books and articles on human rights and corrections'.

== Early life and education ==
Bronstein was born in Brooklyn to Louis and Lillian (née Spielman) Bronstein, who both worked in sales. His father, born Leizer Brunstein, was from Savran, Odesa Oblast (now Ukraine), and his mother from Poland. They moved to the United States to seek refuge from the pogroms.

Bronstein attended Erasmus Hall High School, then the City College of New York before graduating from New York Law School with an LL.B.

== Career ==
He began his career working in the American South during the Civil Rights Movement, becoming the Chief Staff Counsel of the Lawyers’ Constitutional Defense Committee from 1964 to 1968 in Jackson, Mississippi. He litigated civil rights cases during that time in Mississippi, Alabama, and Louisiana, and represented the major civil rights organizations in the South. He was a Fellow at the Kennedy School of Government, Harvard University, from 1969 to 1971. He was Pace Law School’s Practitioner-in-Residence in 2009.

He served as the director of the National Prison Project from 1972 until 1995. During this time, he argued three cases in the United States Supreme Court, Hudson v. McMillan (1992), Block v. Rutherford (1984) (), and Montanye v. Haynes (1976) (). After his departure from the National Prison Project, he has been a consultant for the ACLU. He also served as a board member of Penal Reform International (London) and a member of the Assembly of Delegates for the World Organization Against Torture (Geneva).

He had three children from his first marriage to Kate Ransohoff- Lisa Snitzer of Philadelphia, Susie Renner of Piedmont, Calif., and Laura Zatta of Lowell, Mass.; a daughter from his second marriage to Julie Bronstein- Sarah Bronstein of Berkeley, Calif. He is survived by his wife of 33 years, Jan Elvin. Their son, Benjamin Bronstein, lives in the District of Columbia. Bronstein also had seven grandchildren- Ian, Zoe, Sasha, Daniel, Ava, Corinna, and Sadie.

Bronstein died of Alzheimer's disease on October 24, 2015, in Centreville, Maryland.

== Awards ==
- 1989 MacArthur Foundation Fellowship
- 1985, 1988, 1991, 1994 listed as one of the one hundred most influential lawyers in America by the National Law Journal in their triennial publication, Profiles in Power.
- Frederick Douglass award from the Southern Center for Human Rights
- He has also received awards from the following institutions:
- National Council on Crime and Delinquency
- The Fortune Society ()
- Offender Aid and Restoration
- University of Maine Law School
- Pennsylvania Prison Society
- The Prison Reform Trust (London, England)

== Works ==
- "Incarceration as a Failed Policy", Real Cost of Prisons, August 29, 2005
- The Rights of prisoners: the basic ACLU guide to prisoners' rights, Authors David Rudovsky, Alvin J. Bronstein, Edward I. Koren, Southern Illinois University Press, 1988, ISBN 978-0-8093-1452-2
- Prisoners' self-help litigation manual, Authors James L. Potts, Alvin J. Bronstein, Lexington Books, 1976, ISBN 978-0-669-01640-6
- Prisoners' rights, 1979, Volume 2, Authors Alvin J. Bronstein, Philip J. Hirschkop, Practising Law Institute, 1979
- Representing prisoners, Authors Alvin J. Bronstein, Practising Law Institute, 1981
