= Ben Stahl (activist) =

American political activist (1915–1998)

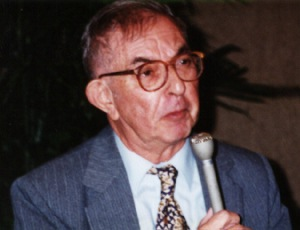

Ben Stahl (1915–1998) was an American political activist of working class interests.

== Education ==
After graduating from Central High School in 1932, he entered Temple University, studied briefly at Gratz College, and became a leader of the Young People's Socialist League before receiving his B.A. in History from Temple in 1936. Immediately after graduation he took a job as a teacher with the Works Progress Administration's Workers' Education Program. He joined the American Federation of Teachers and became the secretary of his local before the age of 22.

== Early career ==
From 1940 until 1942 he worked for the Pennsylvania Department of Public Assistance as a social worker. He married Evelyn Miller in 1942 and in 1943 he took on the role of National Representative with the Congress of Industrial Organizations' (CIO) Department of Organization. Working with the CIO to organize workers in the railroad, telephone, government, social work, brewing, jewelry, and education sectors would take him and his wife around the country from Boston to Los Angeles. Ben continued to work as a field organizer through the merger of the American Federation of Labor with the CIO in 1955 (mergers of local affiliates proceeded slowly over the next decade in Philadelphia). He and his family eventually returned to Philadelphia in 1959, where in 1962 he began the long three-year fight to win the Philadelphia Federation of Teachers and cafeteria workers collective bargaining rights. At victory, the new local became the largest in the state.

Ben Stahl worked until 1969 as a field organizer for the AFL-CIO, when he became the Regional Director of the AFL-CIO's Human Resources Development Institute. He held this position until retirement in July 1982. In 1986 Mayor Wilson Goode appointed him Commissioner of the Philadelphia Commission on Human Relations.

Throughout his working years and well into retirement he involved himself with numerous historical, labor, human rights, and civic organizations, which include:

== Jewish Groups ==
- Jewish Labor Committee
- Jewish Employment and Vocational Service

== Labor Unions ==
- Communications Workers of America Local 189
- Garment Industry Board of Philadelphia
- Philadelphia Federation of Teachers
- United Farm Workers
- Labor Union Bicentennial

== Philadelphia Regional Civic Associations ==
- La Communidad Hispana: Project Mushroom, El Centro Esperanza
- Greater Philadelphia First Corporation
- Greater Philadelphia Urban Affairs Coalition
- Philadelphia Unemployment Project
- Regional Council of Neighborhood Organizations

== Social Service Groups ==
- Offender Aid and Restoration
- People's Emergency Center
- Vocational Education (ACCE)
