= Philadelphia Green =

Philadelphia Green, a program of the Pennsylvania Horticultural Society, is a large urban greening program that serves southeastern Pennsylvania. Since 1974, Philadelphia Green has supported the development and ongoing care of community gardens, neighborhood parks, and public green spaces in Philadelphia.

Working in partnership with neighborhood residents, community organizations, and city agencies, the program uses greening as a community building tool. Additionally, it educates people to make the city a more livable place though horticulture. Proceeds from the annual Philadelphia Flower Show—along with support from foundations, corporations, government agencies, and individuals—help fund Philadelphia Green.

In more than 400 community gardens, residents are tending plots, growing fresh produce, sharing food with neighbors, and discussing and resolving neighborhood issues. In 80 neighborhood parks, “friends of the park” groups work with Philadelphia Green to revitalize their parks.

Philadelphia Green also manages the renovation and long-term maintenance of 60 acres (240,000 m^{2}) of high profile landscapes in the downtown area including the grounds of the Philadelphia Museum of Art, the Azalea Garden, the 26th Street corridor (connecting the airport to Center City), and Penn’s Landing along the Delaware River.

Philadelphia Green also works with the City of Philadelphia to address the problem of vacant land, a serious blight that depresses community property values. To date, more than 3,000 lots, once vacant, abandoned, and blighted as a result of persistent illegal dumping, are now clean and green spaces with lawns and trees that are maintained on a regular basis. The goal is to turn former liabilities into new community assets.

Lastly, the work of Philadelphia Green is having a significant economic impact on real estate values. In two recent studies by the University of Pennsylvania’s Wharton School, research indicates that planting street trees increases the value of adjacent homes by nearly 10 percent. The cleaning and greening of vacant lots has a much larger impact—increasing the value of nearby homes by at least 30 percent.

The Pennsylvania Horticultural Society’s urban greening program, Philadelphia Green, works with residents, community organizations, and public and private entities to create and restore open spaces in the city’s neighborhoods, downtown area, and at its gateways. Proceeds from PHS’s Philadelphia Flower Show, along with funding from foundations, corporations, government agencies and individuals, help to support its projects.
