= Pennsylvania Horticultural Society =

Horticultural organization in Philadelphia, United States

- PHS Logo
- Abbreviation: PHS
- Formation: 1827
- Headquarters: 100 North 20th Street, Philadelphia, PA 19103
- Coordinates: 39.955°N 75.172°W
- Region served: Pennsylvania
- Members: 13,000
- President: Matt Rader
- Budget: $41 million
- Staff: 140+
- Website: http://www.PHSonline.org

The Pennsylvania Horticultural Society (PHS) is a nonprofit organization that promotes horticulture-related events and community activities. It is headquartered in Philadelphia, Pennsylvania. As of 2021, PHS has more than 13,000 members.

PHS was founded in 1827 "to establish a Horticultural Society in the City of Philadelphia for the promotion of this interesting and highly influential branch of Science." PHS hosts the annual Philadelphia Flower Show, the world's largest indoor flower show. Philadelphia LandCare is an urban greening program which promotes improvements in the urban landscape. The Community Greening Award is given annually to caretakers throughout the state in recognition of their beautification efforts.

== History ==
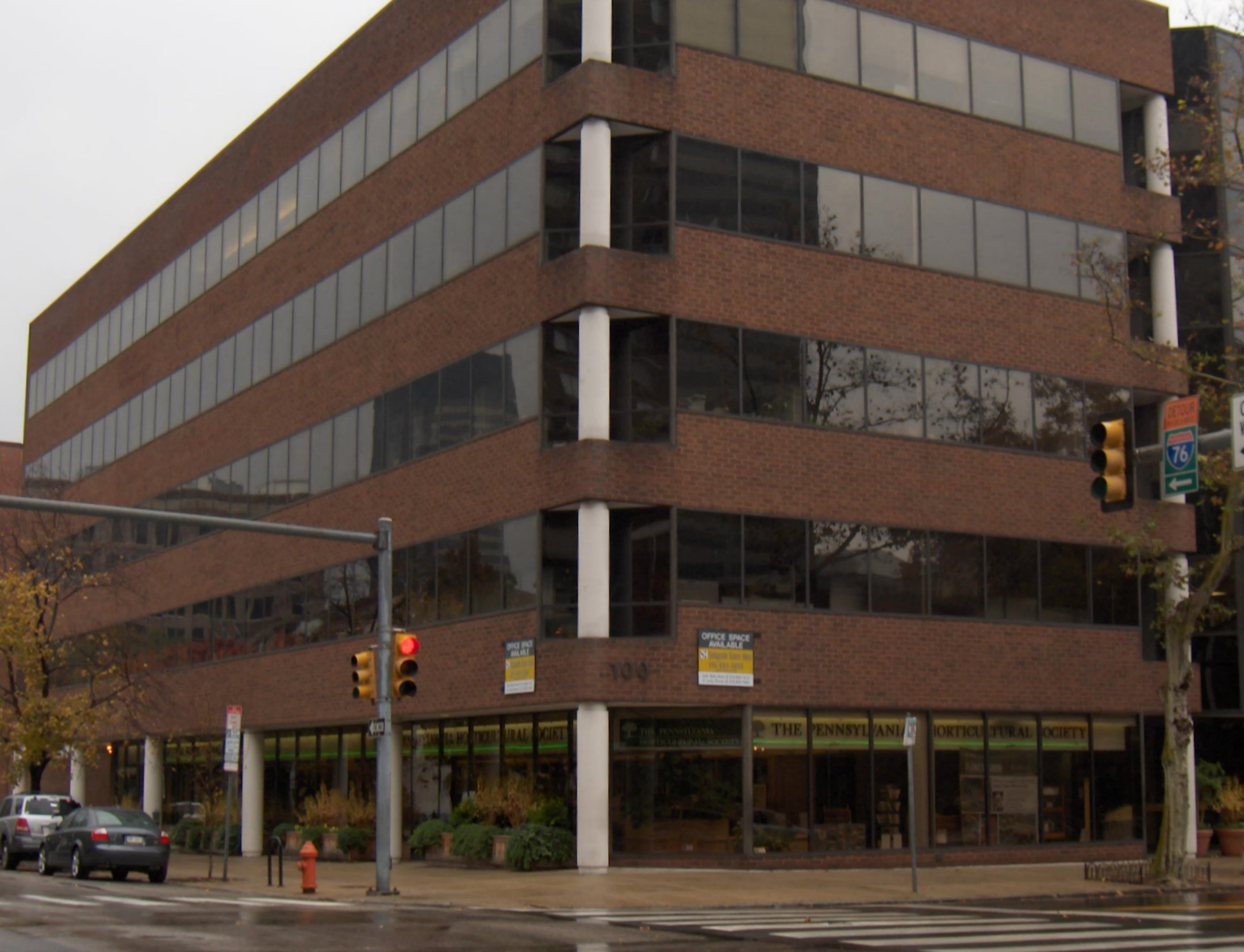
PHS building, with library on the ground floor.

=== Tenancy ===
The Horticultural Society has occupied several homes since its 1827 founding. "It held its first meetings at the Franklin Institute, the American Philosophical Society, the Athenaeum and a few other locations throughout the city."

In 1867, PHS built its first Horticultural Hall, whose location was described as Broad and Lardner Streets or Broad Street below Locust. PHS held flower and horticultural shows here until 1881, when the building was destroyed in a fire. The structure was rebuilt, but again destroyed by fire in 1893.

From 1895 to 1898, PHS was led by banker Clarence H. Clark, who was known for his early collections of rhododendrons and chrysanthemums. During Clark's term as president, PHS built a new horticultural hall on Broad below Locust, which opened in 1895.

In 1917, poor finances forced PHS to sell its building; it subsequently moved to a space in the Finance Building on South Penn Square. From 1923 to 1946, PHS occupied office space in the new Insurance Company of North America Building at 1600 Arch Street. From 1946 to 1964, it rented space above Suburban Station. In 1964, PHS joined with the Philadelphia Society for Promoting Agriculture and moved into a historical row house in the Society Hill neighborhood, on Walnut Street between 3rd and 4th Streets.

In 2003, a former PHS president, J. Liddon Pennock Jr., donated to the Society his 25-acre estate in Abington, Pennsylvania north of Philadelphia. Dubbed Meadowbrook Farm, it sells plants at a retail shop and maintains several greenhouses that are used to prepare plants for the Philadelphia Flower Show.

=== Later initiatives ===
In recent years, PHS has been able to reach new audiences with the addition of its annual PHS Pop-Up Gardens. The first one was in 2011 at 20th and Market streets, however, it began to resonate with younger audiences when Avram Hornik of FCM Hospitality partnered with the organization to bring food and drinks on premise creating a space that reflected the budding trend of pop up beer gardens, for the 2013 location at Broad and Spruce streets.

In 2019, PHS adopted Vision 2027, a new strategy that fully commits PHS to using horticulture to advance the health and well-being of the Greater Philadelphia region. Driven by a diverse community of more than 300,000 supporters, volunteers, and gardeners, PHS uses all its activities to advance four impact priorities: creating healthy living environments, increasing access to fresh food, expanding economic opportunity, and building meaningful social connections.
