= Laurence Salzmann =

American photographer and filmmaker

- Born: January 4, 1944 (age 82); Philadelphia, Pennsylvania, US
- Occupations: Photographer filmmaker

Laurence Salzmann (born January 4, 1944) is an American photographer and filmmaker based in Philadelphia. His work, mostly documentary photography, focuses primarily on the lives of little known groups in America and abroad.

== Early life and career ==
Salzmann was born January 4, 1944, in Philadelphia, Pennsylvania. He describes himself as being "of that generation which thought that photography could bring about socially beneficial change." Educated in Philadelphia schools, he acquired photographic skills along the way, often from older photographers. Much of his career has involved using photography to preserve the history of groups of people in danger of being ignored and forgotten and encouraging his subjects to retrieve memories and tell their stories. Edward Sozanski, the late Philadelphia Inquirer art critic, wrote of Salzmann's work, "Cross a visual anthropologist with a talented photographer and you get Laurence Salzmann" and goes on to say that Salzmann's deep immersions in local cultures are "what give his photographs exceptional resonance and poignancy."

Salzmann's first documentary project, "Family of Luis" (1966–67), came out of his assignment as a Peace Corps trainee in a barrio humilde of Ciudad Juarez. It attracted the notice of the Photography Curator at the Philadelphia Museum of Art, Kneeland McNaulty, who bought several prints for their Museum Collection. The "Family of Luis" essay led to Salzmann's being hired as a participant observer and photographer by St. Luke's Hospital Department of Community Psychiatry for a joint project with Columbia University. Again, he lived among his subjects, this time in a Single Room Occupancy hotel, on New York's Upper West Side. documenting the lives of its residents. His work, Neighbors on the Block, was published by the New York State Council on the Arts. A grant from the American Film Institute for documentary film making enabled him and filmmaker Peter Barton to complete two films about residents of the hotels.

Salzmann took courses in Sociology at the New School of Social Research and earned a Master of Arts in Visual Anthropology from Temple University (1971–2). This training, in addition to his photographic experience, led to work with Tim Asch as editor for several of the films (Children's Magical Death, New Tribes Mission, Tug of War, Weeding the Garden) in Asch's Yamomoto film series (1971) and as an editor on Alan Lomax's Choreometrics project.

== Romania and Turkey ==
A Fulbright grant enabled Salzmann to spend 1974 – 1976 in the small Romanian town of Radauti, documenting the lives of the remaining members of its Jewish community who had survived the Holocaust. Again, Salzmann learned the language of his subjects and lived among them. His pictures were published in the book: The Last Jews of Radauti with text by Ayşe Gürsan-Salzmann, (Doubleday, 1983). His film, Song of Radauti was broadcast nationwide by PBS. At the invitation of Cornell Capa, Director of the International Center of Photography, a large selection of the Radauti pictures was shown at the International Center of Photography.

A grant from the International Research & Exchanges Board allowed Salzmann to live for a year documenting the lives of Transhumant (migratory) shepherds in the Transylvania region of Romania. That work was published in book form under the title of Miortiza and shown in the Bucuresti Peasant Museum. At the invitation of the 500 Years Foundation, Salzmann was invited to Turkey to produce a photographic essay on the country's Jewish community. This project took 5 years to complete and culminated in an exhibit, Anyos Munchos I Buenos, that was shown in museums in Israel, the Netherlands, Germany, France, and the United States, in addition to two books, and a documentary film.

== Latin America ==
More recently, Salzmann has worked in Cuba, Mexico, and Peru.

From 1999 to 2004, he documented the lives and work of artists and wrestlers in Fidel Castro’s Cuba in photo series and films. His study of young wrestlers, titled La Lucha/The Struggle, were accompanied by gouache paintings by Cuban artist Luis El Estudiante. Writing of the work, Miles Orvell wrote, "Salzmann's photographs constitute an aesthetic and social document of great power...and are a tribute to his generous vision of cross-cultural understanding.”

Salzmann also published more experimental, abstract photographs from Cuba in Imagining Cutumba, which takes as its subjects one of Cuba's oldest dance companies, the Ballet Folklórico Cutumba.

Between 2005 and 2008, Salzmann photographed the life that some Mexican immigrants in Philadelphia left behind in the Sierra Norte de Puebla, a mountainous, rural region of Mexico. He also interviewed residents about the changes that increasing emigration had brought to the region for a documentary film.

The resulting project was Échele Ganas (Do Your Best), published as a book in 2012 and exhibited at a six-week celebration of Mexican culture in Philadelphia that year.

Salzmann has also traveled extensively in Peru’s Sacred Valley.

After meeting speakers of Quechuan, an indigenous language family used by the Inca Empire, he was inspired to study the language and document the ways in which pre-Hispanic culture continues on in the region. He was granted a Fulbright Fellowship for this work in 2015 and returned multiple times between 2016-2020. During this period, he produced Mish’I Kachi Runakuna/Sweet Salt People and Salt People, which shows the use of ancient salt harvesting practices by the people of Maras, Peru and neighboring communities.

== Legacy ==
In 2018, Laurence Salzmann and his wife Ayşe Gürsan-Salzmann gifted to a large collection of Salzmann’s work to the Kislak Center at the University of Pennsylvania Libraries.

Summing up Salzmann's work, Jason Francisco, Associate Professor of Film and Media Studies at Emory College, has written “”The core intelligence of Salzmann's [work] is his non-didacticism, his unwillingness to forsake the suggestive for the merely explanatory ...”

In 2023, the University of Pennsylvania Libraries hosted a retrospective exhibit of Salzmann's life's work, titled “A Life With Others.”

== Publications ==
- 2023 Kutlu Sokak: Blessed Street, Blue Flower Press, Philadelphia
- 2023 Found at the Getty, Blue Flower Press, Philadelphia
- 2022 A Life with Others, University of Pennsylvania Libraries, Philadelphia, PA
- 2022 SWIM, Blue Flower Press, Philadelphia
- 2022 Xiloxoxtla: The Place of the Flowering Corn, Blue Flower Press, Philadelphia
- 2022 Convent De San Benardion de Siena, Blue Flower Press, Philadelphia
- 2022 CORAL, Blue Flower Press, Philadelphia
- 2022 Remembering Radauti, Blue Flower Press, Philadelphia
- 2022 Among the Birches, Blue Flower Press, Philadelphia
- 2022 Aegean Blue, Blue Flower Press, Philadelphia
- 2021 Llamas & Donkeys, Blue Flower Press, Philadelphia
- 2021 Misk'I Kachi Runakuna // Sweet Salt People // Gente de Sal Dulce, Blue Flower Press, Philadelphia
- 2018 Almendros, Blue Flower Press, Philadelphia
- 2017 Misk’I Kachi // Sweet Salt // Sal Dulce, Blue Flower Press, Philadelphia.
- 2013 Several Weeks, Blue Flower Press, Philadelphia
- 2012 EcheleGanas/ Do Your Best, Blue Flower Press, Philadelphia
- 2010 in Search of Turkey's Jews, Libra Press, Istanbul.
- 2006 La Lucha/The Struggle, Blue Flower Press, Philadelphia.
- 2005 De Noche//By Night, Artist's Book, Philadelphia.
- 2002 Imagining Cutumba, Lafayette College, Easton, PA.
- 1999 Miorita: An Icon of Romanian Culture, (ed.) with an introduction by Ernest H. Latham Jr. Essay by Alexandru Husar, Photographs by Laurence Salzmann, The Center for Romanian Studies, Iasi, Romania.
- 1995 Face to Face: Encounters between Jews & Blacks, Blue Flower Press, Philadelphia.
- 1995 Fully Exposed: The Male Nude in Photography, Emanuel Cooper. Routledge, London.
- 1995 The Male Nude: A Male View: An Anthology, ed. Peter Weiermair, Edition Stemmle, Zurich.
- 1993 Mexico Through Foreign Eyes, eds. Carole Naggar and Fred Ritchin. W. W. Norton & Company, New York.
- 1992 Flesh & Blood, Photographers’ Images of their Own Families, Picture Project.
- 1990 Anyos Munchos i Buenos, co-authored with Ayse Gürsan-Salzmann, Blue Flower/Photo Review.
- 1986 Männer Sehen Männer: Aktografie und ihre zeitgenössischen Vertreter, Peter Weiermair. Schaffhausen Verlag Photographie, Frankfurt.
- 1983 The Last Jews of Radauti, co-authored with Ayse Gürsan-Salzmann, Dial/Doubleday.
- 1980 La Baie/bath scenes, Han Books.
- 1980 A Family Passover, Jewish Publication Society, Philadelphia.
- 1980 Stone Roses, poems from Transylvania by Keith Wilson, photographs by Laurence Salzmann, Utah State University Press.
- 1978 Jerusalem's People in Public, portfolio, Blue Flower Press.
- 1971 Neighbors on the Block, portfolio, published by New York State Council on the Arts.

== Collections ==
Salzmann's work is held in the following public collections:

- Museum of the Jewish People at Beit Hatfutsot, Tel Aviv.
- Brooklyn Museum of Art, NY.
- Bryn Mawr College, Library, Bryn Mawr, PA.
- Corcoran Gallery, Washington, D.C.
- Haverford College, Haverford, PA.
- High Museum of Art, Atlanta.
- International Center of Photography, New York.
- The Jewish Museum of New York, New York.
- Lehigh University Art Galleries (LUAG), Bethlehem, PA.
- Musée d'Art et d'Histoire du Judaïsme, Paris.
- Philadelphia Museum of Art, Philadelphia.
- Philadelphia Free Library, Philadelphia.
- Yale University, New Haven, CT.
- Widener Library, Harvard University, Cambridge, MA.

== Films ==
- 2017 Tales of the Inca.
- 2011 Revisiting Turkey's Jews, Vol. 1, 2011: Habib.
- 2010 El Rayo
- 2003 Imagining Cutumba, backstage with Balet Folklorico Cutumba Santiago.
- 2003 Willy's Blessing, travels in Cuba with my friend Willy.
- 1989 Turkey's Sephardim: 500 Years.
- 1980 Who's havin' Fun, story of Philadelphia Mummers off and on Broad Street.
- 1978 Song of Radauti, poetic rendition of Jewish Life in a small town of Romania.
- 1971 Scag: story of two young Philadelphians battle with heroin addiction.
- 1970 Alfred, story of resident of Single Room Occupancy Hotel New York.
- 1969 Eddie, story of resident of Single Room Occupancy Hotel New York.
- 1966 The Ragman, story of one of last horse and wagon men of Philadelphia.
