= Offender Aid and Restoration =

Offender Aid and Restoration (OAR) is a movement that began in the 1970s in response to a prison riot in Charlottesville, Virginia. A group of volunteers from the community believed that individuals incarcerated could be assisted by volunteers in successfully returning to the community after their incarceration. Many offices opened around the country focused on this mission and using the name of OAR. Today, there is no longer an umbrella organization by the name of OAR, but six locations still remain with the title of OAR, each of which operates independently of one another. Some of the locations changed the meaning of the acronym to be different from the original "Offender Aid and Restoration" (for example, the location in Fairfax utilizes "Opportunities, Alternatives and Resources"). Four of these locations are based in Virginia (Arlington, Fairfax, Richmond and Charlottesville), one is in Indiana and one is in New Jersey.
