= JEVS Human Services =

JEVS Human Services logo 2023

JEVS Human Services is a not-for-profit, nonsectarian social service agency based in Philadelphia in the United States. Its aim is to enhance clients' employability and self-sufficiency through a broad range of education, training, health and rehabilitation programs. JEVS Human Services (JEVS) works with individuals to create sustainable paths to independence and economic security.

JEVS Human Services was founded in 1941 as the Employment and Vocational Bureau. In 1951 the name was then changed to Jewish Employment and Vocational Services (JEVS). The name was changed to the present one, JEVS Human Services, in 2006 as part of a corporate rebranding. The consulting firm hired by JEVS explains the need for a name change on its website as follows: "There was confusion about what the acronym JEVS meant ... JEVS has evolved over the years and no longer serves exclusively Jewish people, nor is it solely an organization that offers employment and vocational services."

JEVS Human Services operates the Orleans Technical College, which offers training in a variety of occupations; and JEVS Care at Home offering in-home supports for people with disabilities and older adults.
