= Philadelphia Flower Show =

American horticultural event

Coordinates: 39.9540°N 75.1602°W

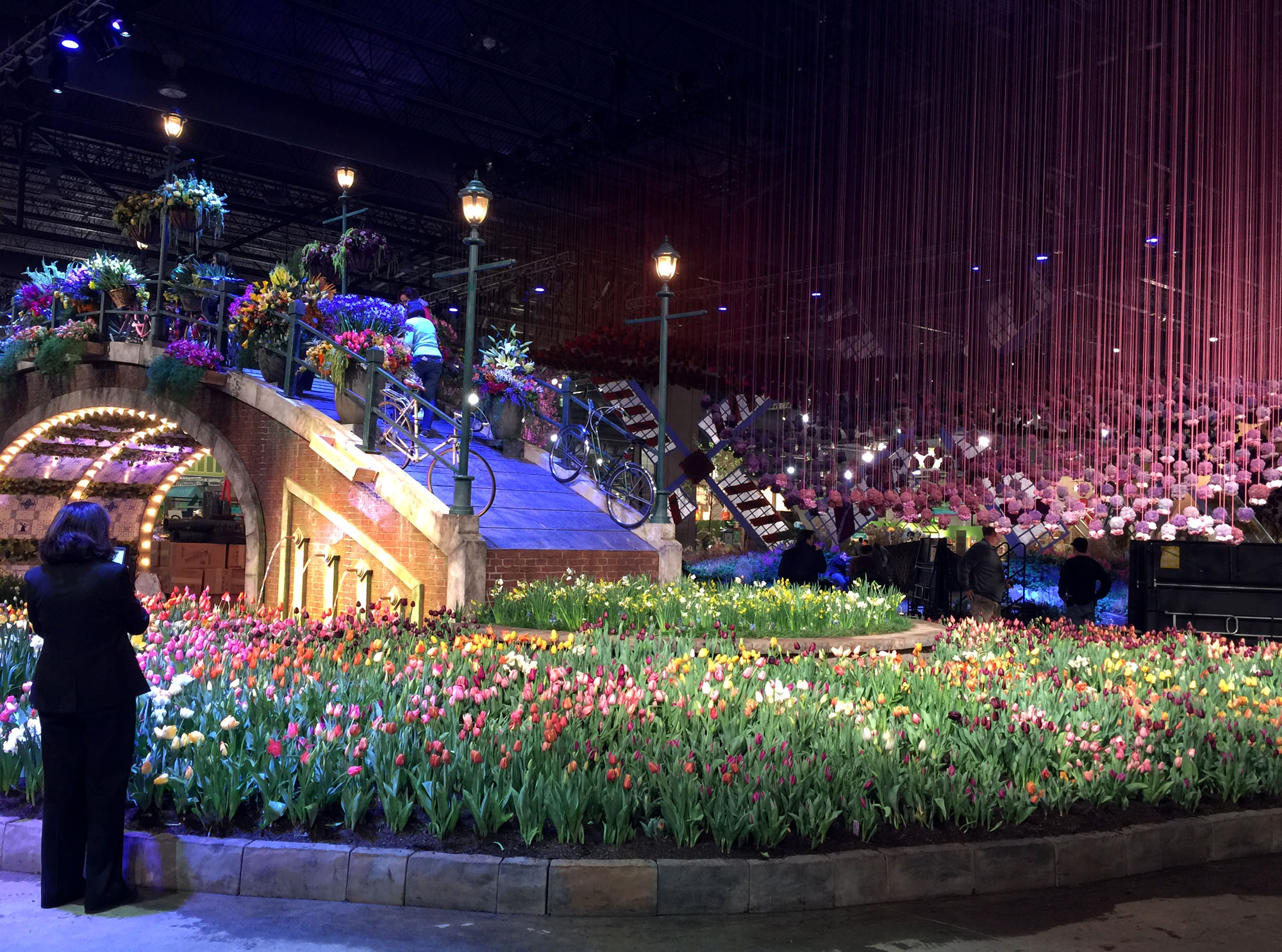
- 2017 Philadelphia Flower Show entrance.
- Frequency: Annual
- Venue: Pennsylvania Convention Center, Philadelphia, Pennsylvania, U.S.; Franklin Delano Roosevelt Park
- Organizer: Pennsylvania Horticultural Society
- Website: https://phsonline.org/the-flower-show

The Philadelphia Flower Show is an annual event produced by The Pennsylvania Horticultural Society (PHS) and traditionally held in Philadelphia, Pennsylvania, at the Pennsylvania Convention Center in early March. It is the oldest and largest indoor flower show in the world, attracting more than 250,000 people annually. It has also been described as "the country's oldest, largest, and most prestigious celebration of flowers."

The show features large scale gardens, which range from elaborate landscaped displays to individual and club entries of a prize horticultural specimen. Each year, the PHS declares an official theme. The exhibits are submitted for judging in many categories, and are highly competitive.

A popular part of the show floor is the Garden marketplace where visitors can buy plants and seeds, cut flowers, craft items, and other flower, landscaping and horticulture-related items.

The Show demonstrates floral and garden design, live entertainment, culinary events, gardening how-to workshops and lectures by experts.

The June 2022 event will feature 40 major exhibitors, featuring the theme "In Full Bloom."

In 2021 and 2022, the show was held outside in the summer at FDR Park due to COVID-19 pandemic. It returned to the Convention Center in March 2023 with the theme "The Garden Electric."

== Competitors ==
The amateur division of the show known as the Competitive Classes often have an assigned theme, related to the overall show theme. The 2007 Show, Legends of Ireland, featured Pressed Plant Material (i.e. dried flower pictures) that "incorporated a Celtic Knot." The first weekend's Medium Niche theme was Wish You Were Here "Exhibitors will be sent Irish postcards for inspiration. A copy of the postcard will be mounted next to the exhibit." Entrants for that class typically have a mockup of the niche at home, where they practice assembling and lighting their entry in the months preceding the show. In a Challenge class, entrants bring only pruning shears, and must use show-provided materials to interpret a theme within a limited amount of time. Three typical Horticulture classes are 142: Clivia, flowering. Pot 8" or under, 143: Clivia, flowering. Pot 8"-10", and 144: Clivia, foliage. (There was also a Clivia entered in 2007 under Exceptional plants 10–20 years old, to be judged against “perfection” for their species/cultivar.)

Seth Pearsoll, PHS director of design, stated the desired type of Flower Show participants:

We want designers who are firmly rooted in horticulture and great plant design, but who also are thinking about culture at large and how these designs relate to those issues. We want guests to be moved and delighted and to be changed, in some small way, by these gardens and the ideas behind them.

== History ==
The international nonprofit organization Pennsylvania Horticultural Society was founded in 1827. The site claims the PHS "uses horticulture to advance the health and well-being of the Greater Philadelphia region," and that their programs "create healthier living environments, increase access to fresh food, expand access to jobs and economic opportunity, and strengthen deeper social connections between people."

In 1829, the first Philadelphia Flower Show was held in a Freemason building.The one-day exhibition showcased fruit, flowers, and plants. This included the poinsettia, a plant then-newly imported from Mexico, which was exhibited by Colonel Robert Carr. The Encyclopedia of American Folklife credits the flower show with introducing poinsettias as an American Christmas tradition, as the festival introduced the plant to hundreds of Americans.

There were no shows in 1917–18 nor 1942–45.

In 1925, the PHS joined the Florist Club, an association of local florist businesses. The 1925 show attracted 84,000 people. In 1927, Philadelphia Flower Show, Inc. was established; it assumed management of the Flower Show until the mid-1960s.

In 1964, Philadelphia Flower Show Inc. halted production of the show due to difficulty finding a suitable exhibition location. The show returned in 1966, moving to the now-demolished Philadelphia Civic Center, where it remained each year until 1996, when it moved to its present location at the Pennsylvania Convention Center. Today, PHS contributes to the local economy and the green life of Philadelphia and the region. Proceeds from the Flower Show support thousands of revitalization projects in communities. In recent years, a youth division was added to the pressed flower category, with the most recent winner being Kendall Wolson, a 17-year-old student from New Jersey who created a scene depicting two bears catching fish in a river.

In 1981, total attendance was 230,000; 210,000 were guests who had paid admission, and the rest were exhibitors, judges, PHS members, and the press.

The 2020 theme was "Riviera Holiday."

In 2021, the Philadelphia Flower Show was held outdoors at Franklin Delano Roosevelt Park in June instead of its usual location at the Pennsylvania Convention Center due to the COVID-19 pandemic. This was the first time the Philadelphia Flower Show was held outdoors. The 2022 show was also held at FDR Park. In 2023, the Philadelphia Flower Show will return to the Pennsylvania Convention Center and will be held in March.

== Dates and themes ==
Dates and themes
Year	Date range	Theme
2025	March 1–9	Gardens of Tomorrow
2024	March 2–10	United by Flowers
2023	March 4–12	The Garden Electric
2022	June 11–19	In Full Bloom
2021	June 5–13	Habitat
2020	February 29 - March 8	Riviera Holiday
2019	March 2–10	Flower Power
2018	March 3–11	Wonders of Water
2017	March 11–19	Holland: Flowering the World
2016	March 5–13	Explore America
2015	February 28 - March 8	Celebrate the Movies
2014	March 1–9	ARTiculture
2013	March 2–10	Brilliant!
2012	March 4–11	Hawaii: Islands of Aloha
2011	March 6–13	Springtime in Paris
2010	February 28 - March 7	Passport to the World
2009	March 1–8	Bella Italia
2008	March 2–9	Jazz It Up!
2007	March 4–11	Legends of Ireland
2006	March 5–12	Enchanted Spring...A Tribute to Mother Nature
2005	March 6–13	America the Beautiful
2004	March 7–14	Destination Paradise
2003	March 2–9	Festival de Las Flores
2002	March 3–10	The Pleasures of the Garden
2001	March 4–11	Great Gardeners of the World
2000	March 5–12	Gardens for the New Millennium
1999	March 7–14	Design on Nature...the Art of Gardening
1998	March 1–8	La Passion du Jardin
1997	March 2–9	The Great Exchange - People, Places, and Plants
1996	February 25 - March 3	This Land is Your Land - "Philadelphia In Flower"
1995	March 5–12	Moments in Time...A Galaxy of Gardens
1994	March 6–13	Islands in the Sun
1993	March 7–14	Preserving the Past, Presenting the Future
1992	March 8–15	Horizons for Discovery
1991	March 10–17	Endless Spring
1990	March 11–18	Purely for Pleasure...Gardens for the Senses
1989	March 5–12	Kaleidoscope...The Wonderful World of Color
1988	March 6–13	The World is Your Garden
1987	March 8–15	The Way We Were...Gardens from the Past
1986	March 9–16	Hometown USA
1985	March 3–10	A Touch of Britain...Our Garden Heritage
1984	March 11–18	A Trip to the Orient
1983	March 6–13	Follow the Sun
1982	March 7–14	Penn's Greene Countrie Towne
1981	March 8–15	N/A
1980	March 9–16	N/A
1979	March 18–25	N/A
1978	March 5–12	N/A
1977	March 13–20	N/A
1976	March 7–14	N/A
1975	March 9–16	N/A
1974	March 10–17	N/A
1973	March 11–18	N/A
1972	March 12–19	N/A
1971	March 7–14	N/A
1970	March 15–22	You and Your Garden
1969	March 9 - 16	Flowers Round the World
1968	March 10–17	N/A
1967	March 12–19	A Carnival of Flowers
1966	March 12–17	Natural Beauty in Town and Country
1965	March 13–18	N/A
1964	March 8–14	An Abundance of Flowers
1963	March 10–17	N/A
1962	March 11–18	Garden Bounty
1961	March 5–11	N/A
1960	March 7–12	Dancing Waters

Previous dates extend to 1829, but PHS did not record their dates and themes in the above listing.

Historical art and photographs from 1829 to present relating to the PHS's Flower Show can be found on the Digital Archives of Pennsylvania Department of Education.

== Gallery ==
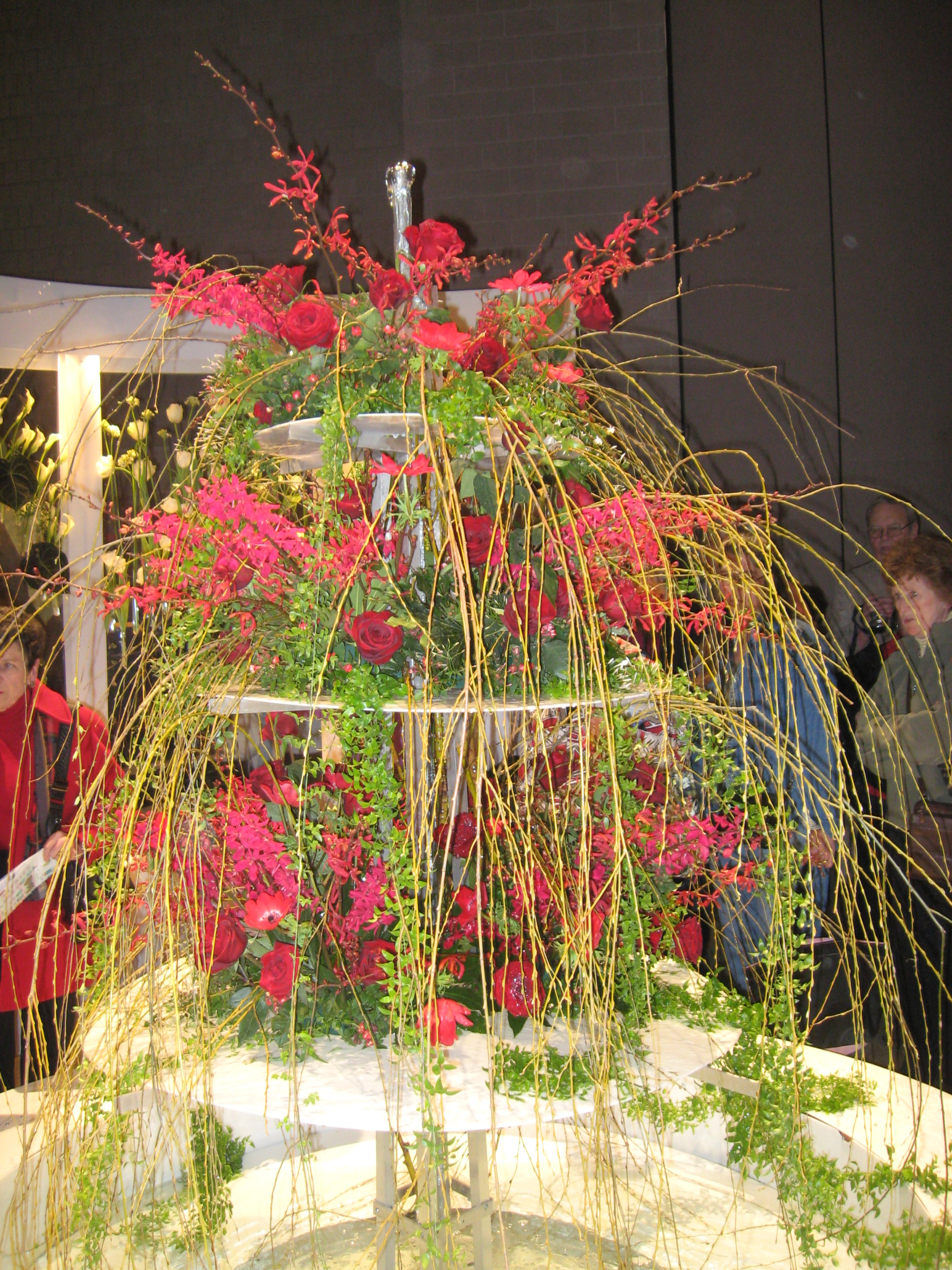
2009 Philadelphia Flower Show

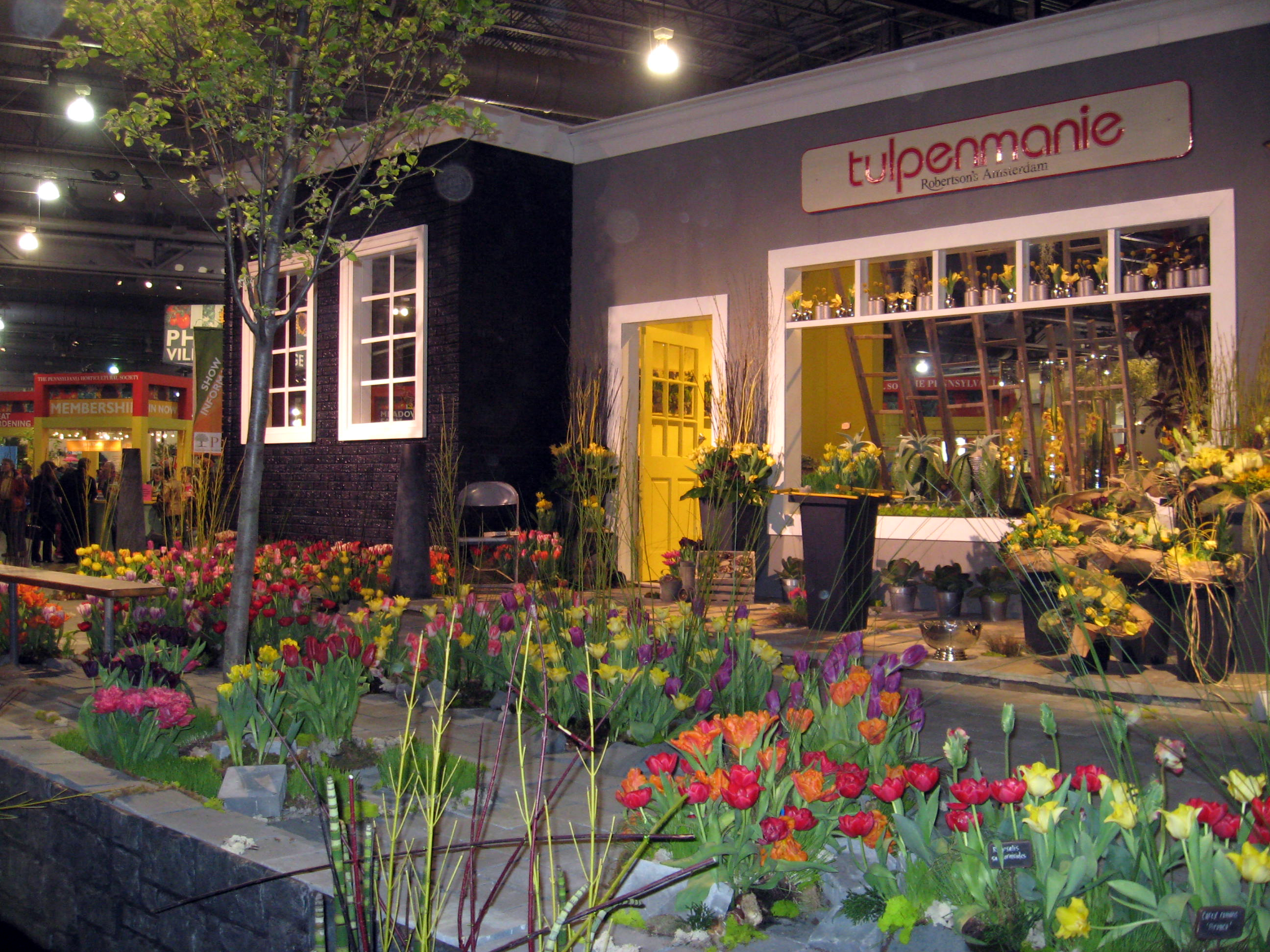
2010 Philadelphia Flower Show

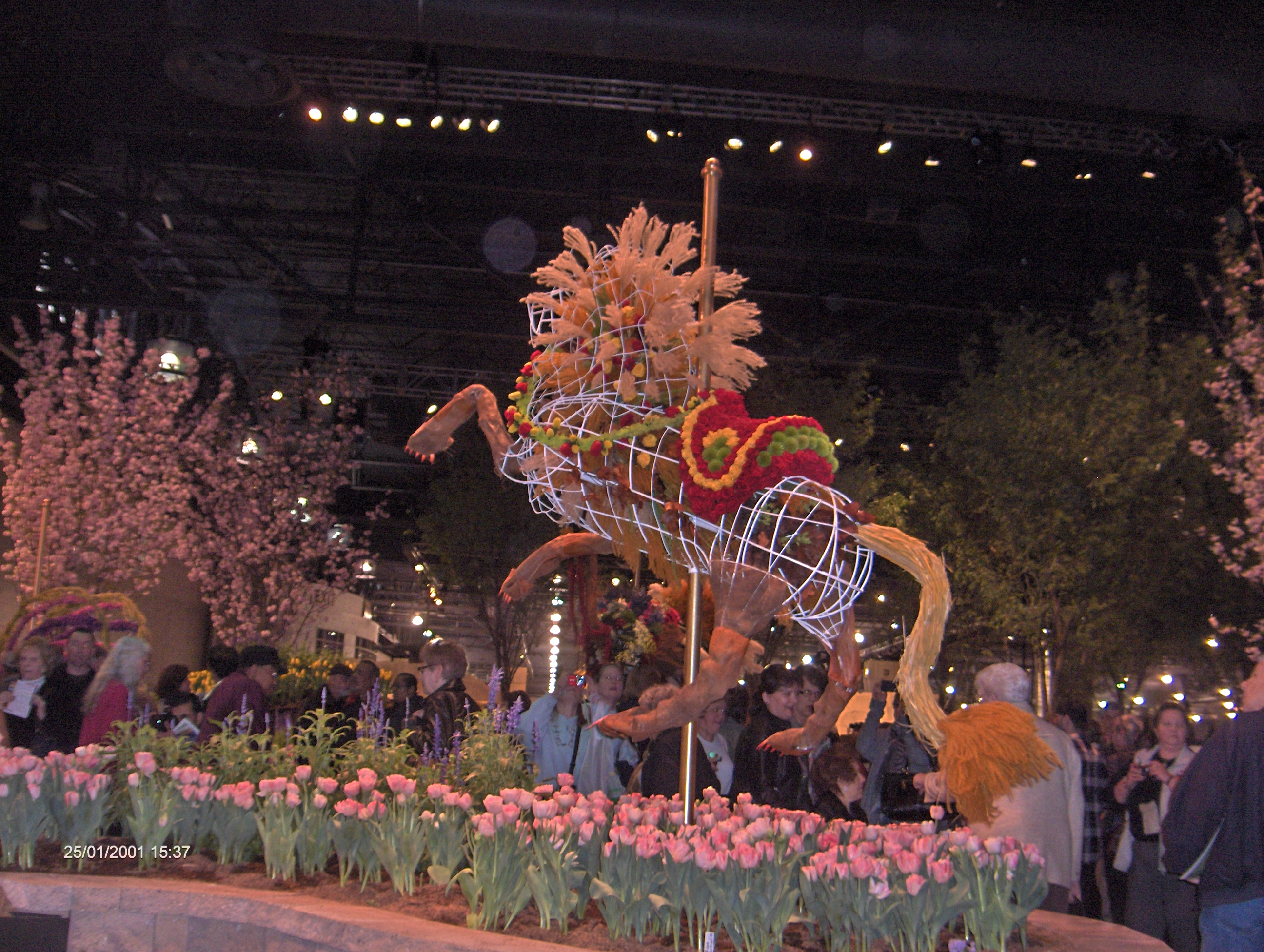
Carousel animal, 2011

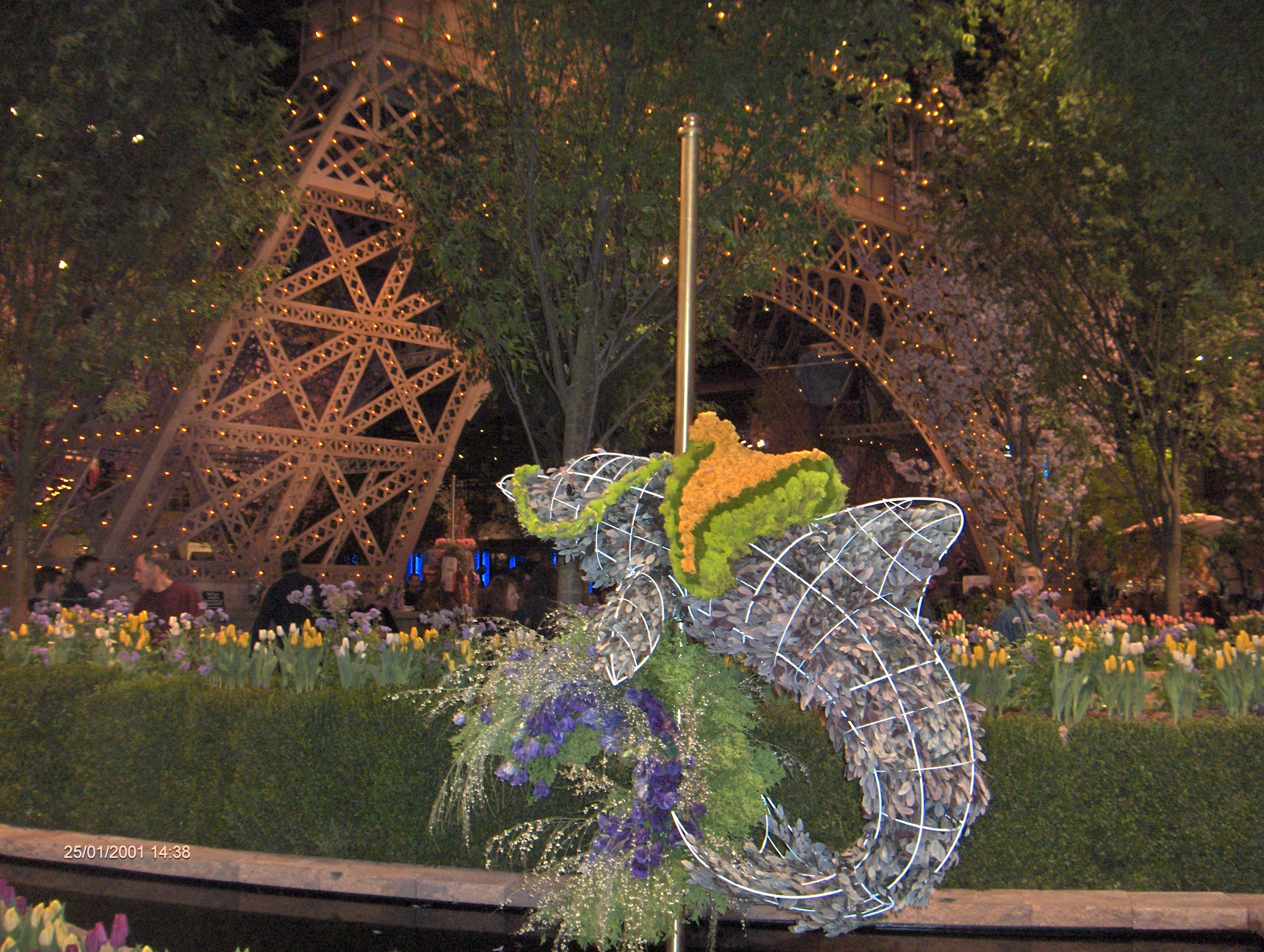
Dolphin, Eiffel Tower, 2011

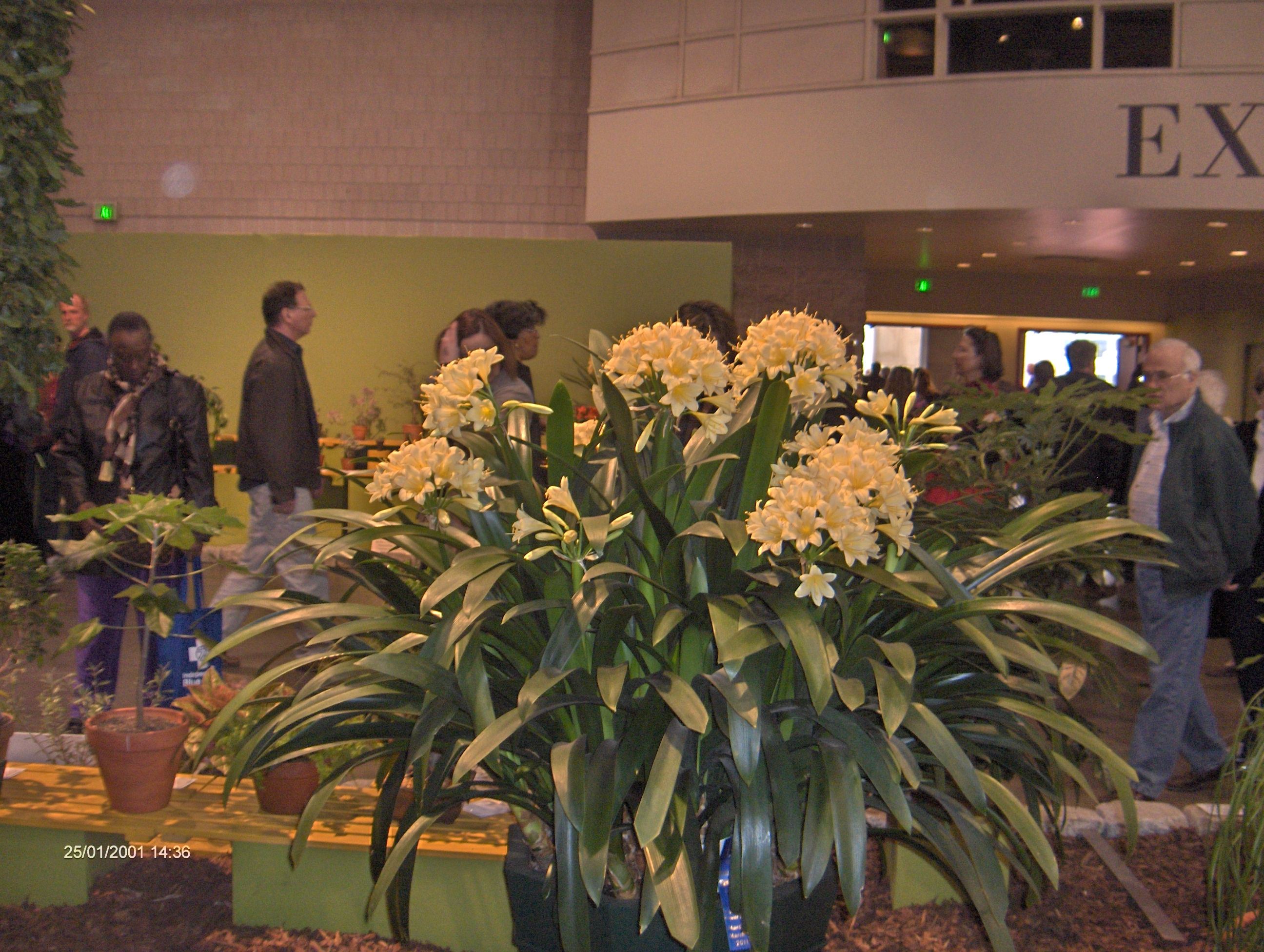
Flowers, 2011

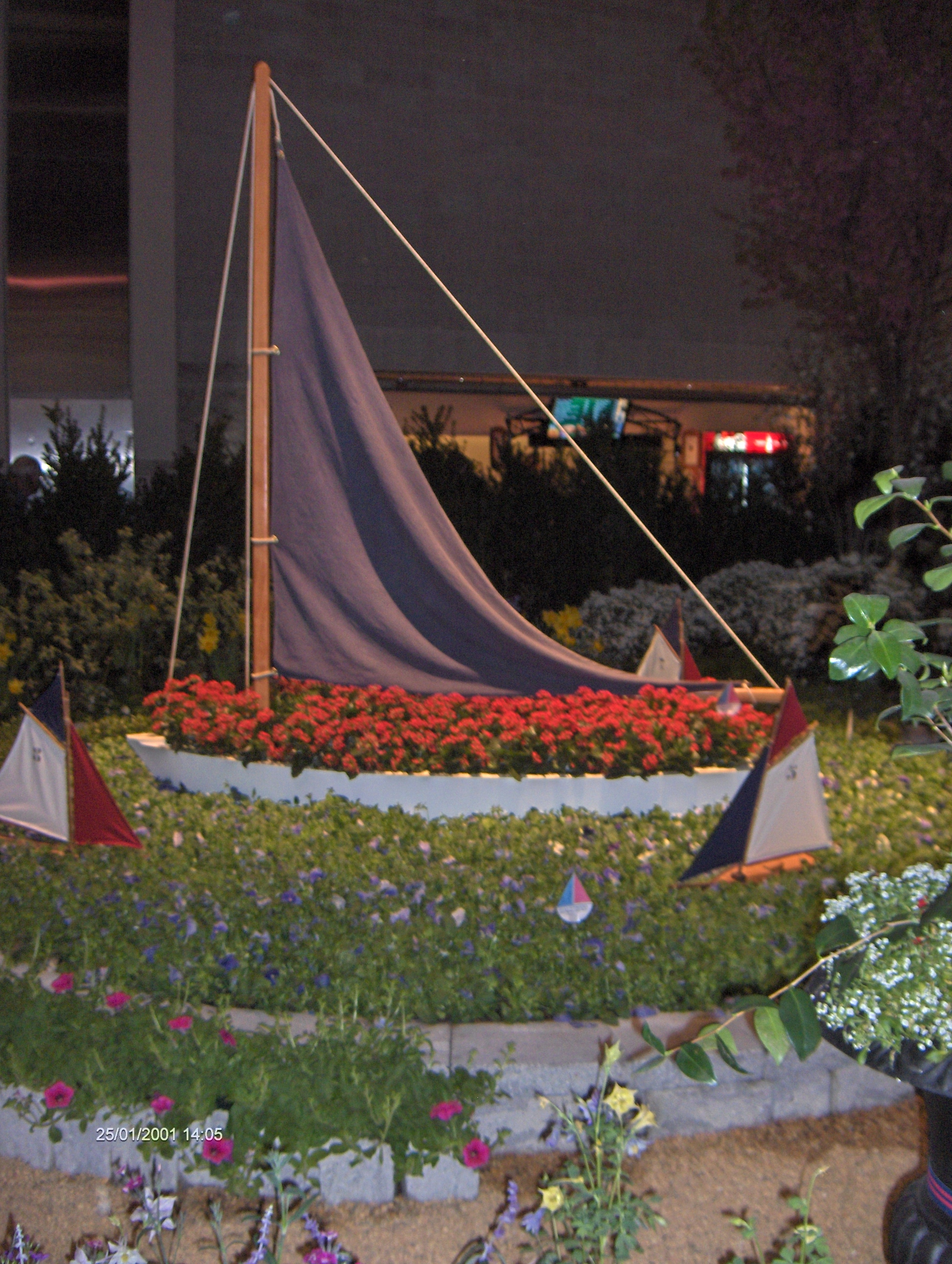
Boat of flowers, 2011

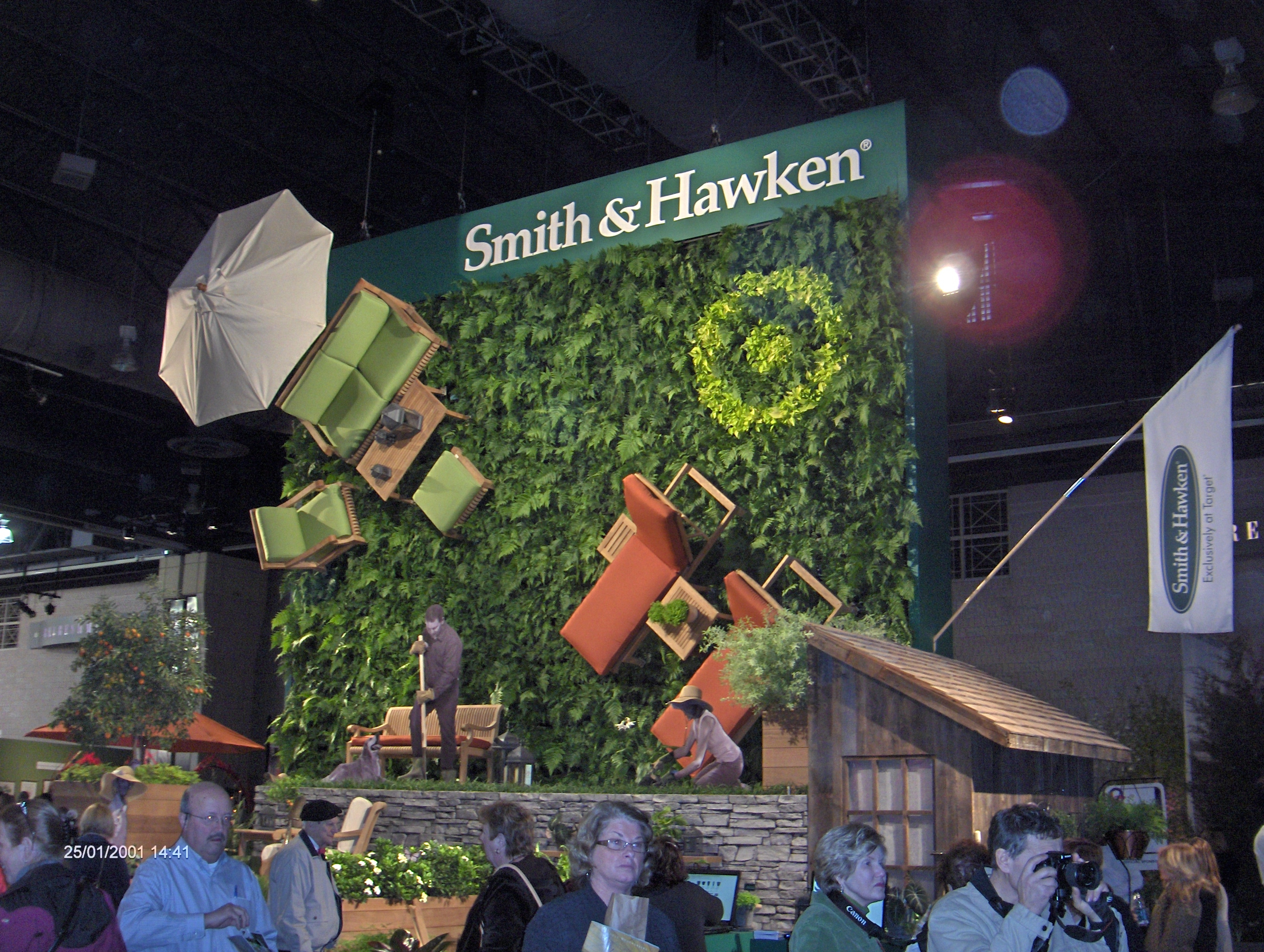
Green Wall, 2011

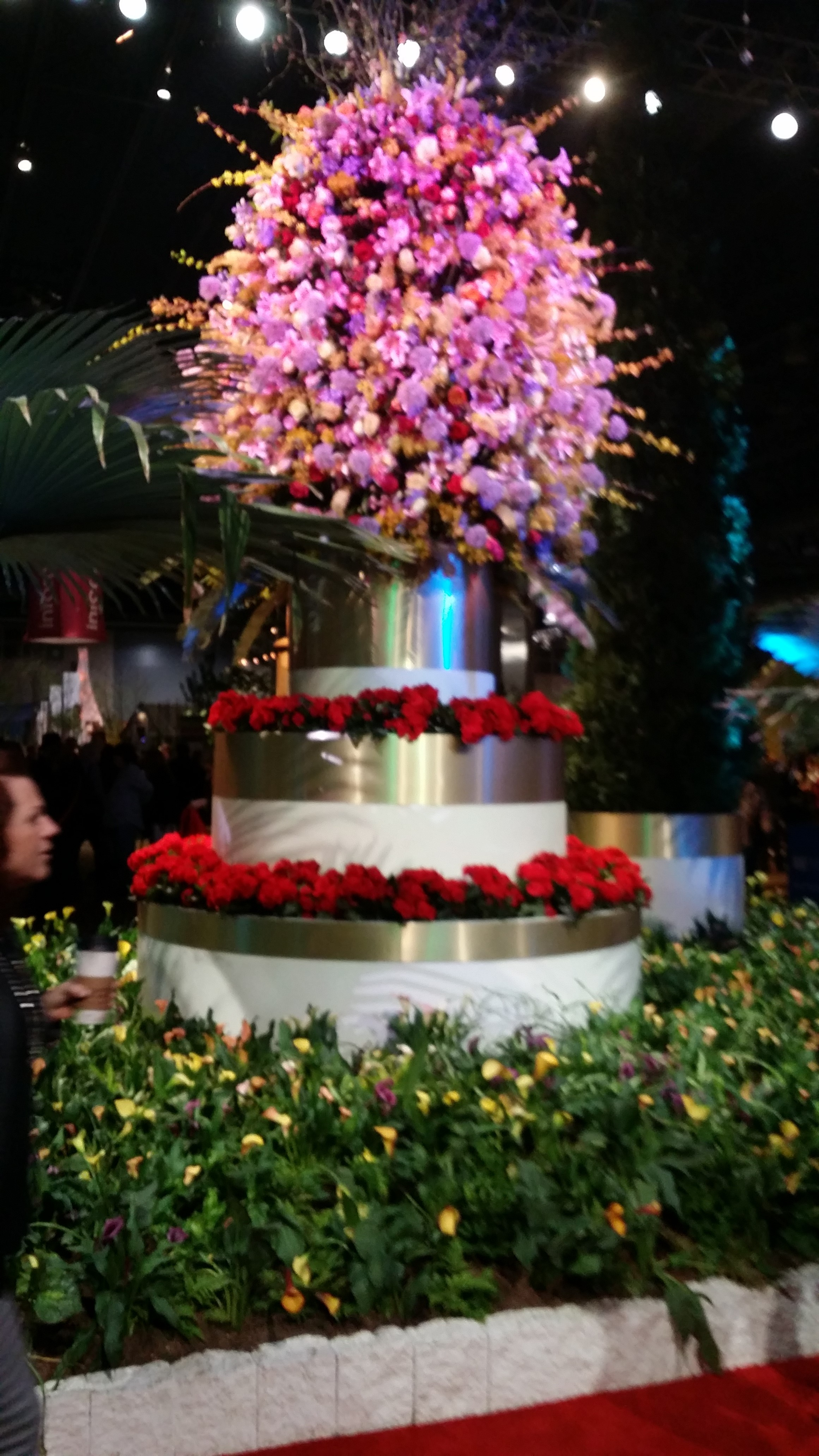
Philadelphia Flower Show 2015

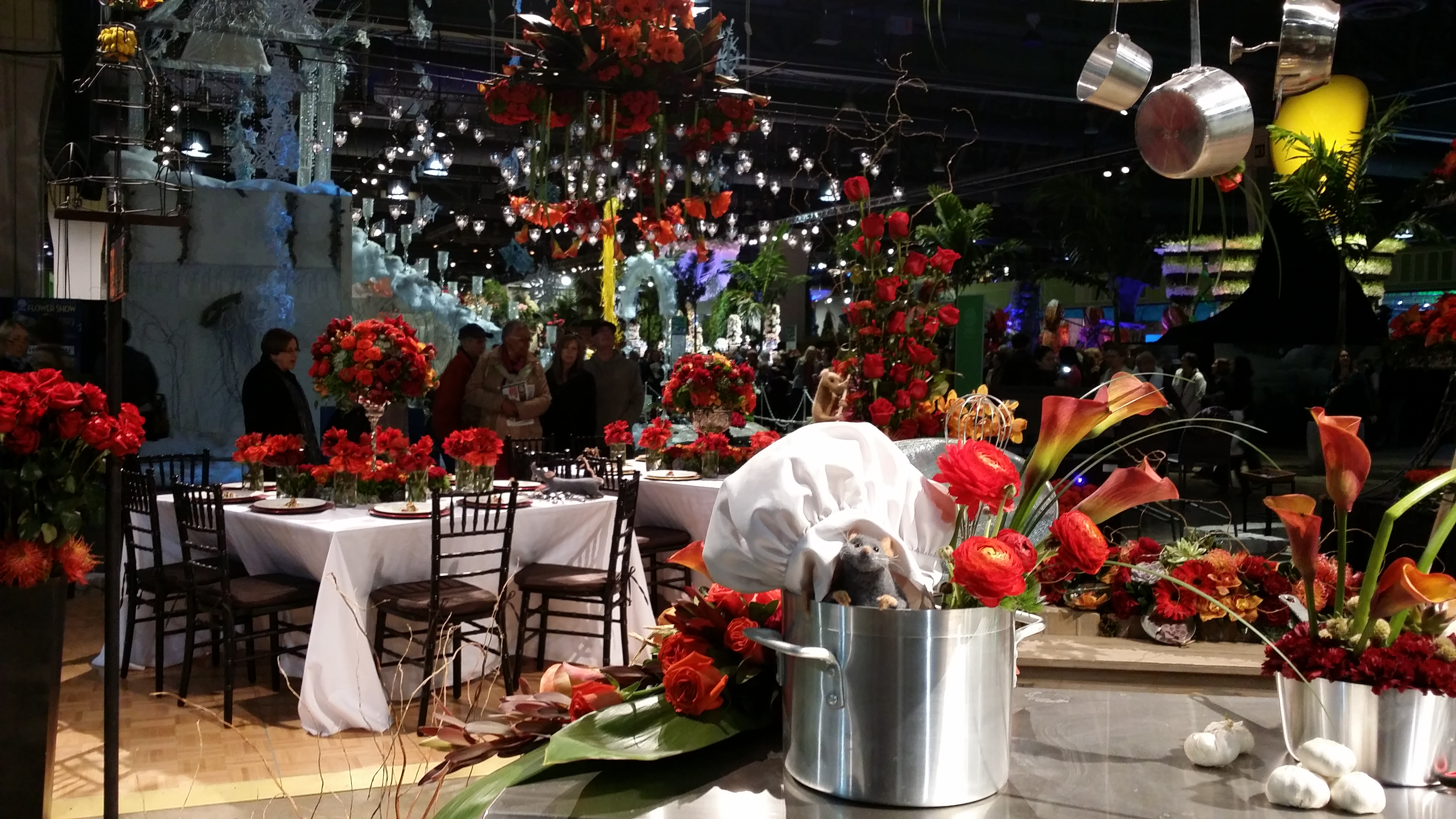
2015 Philadelphia Flower Show

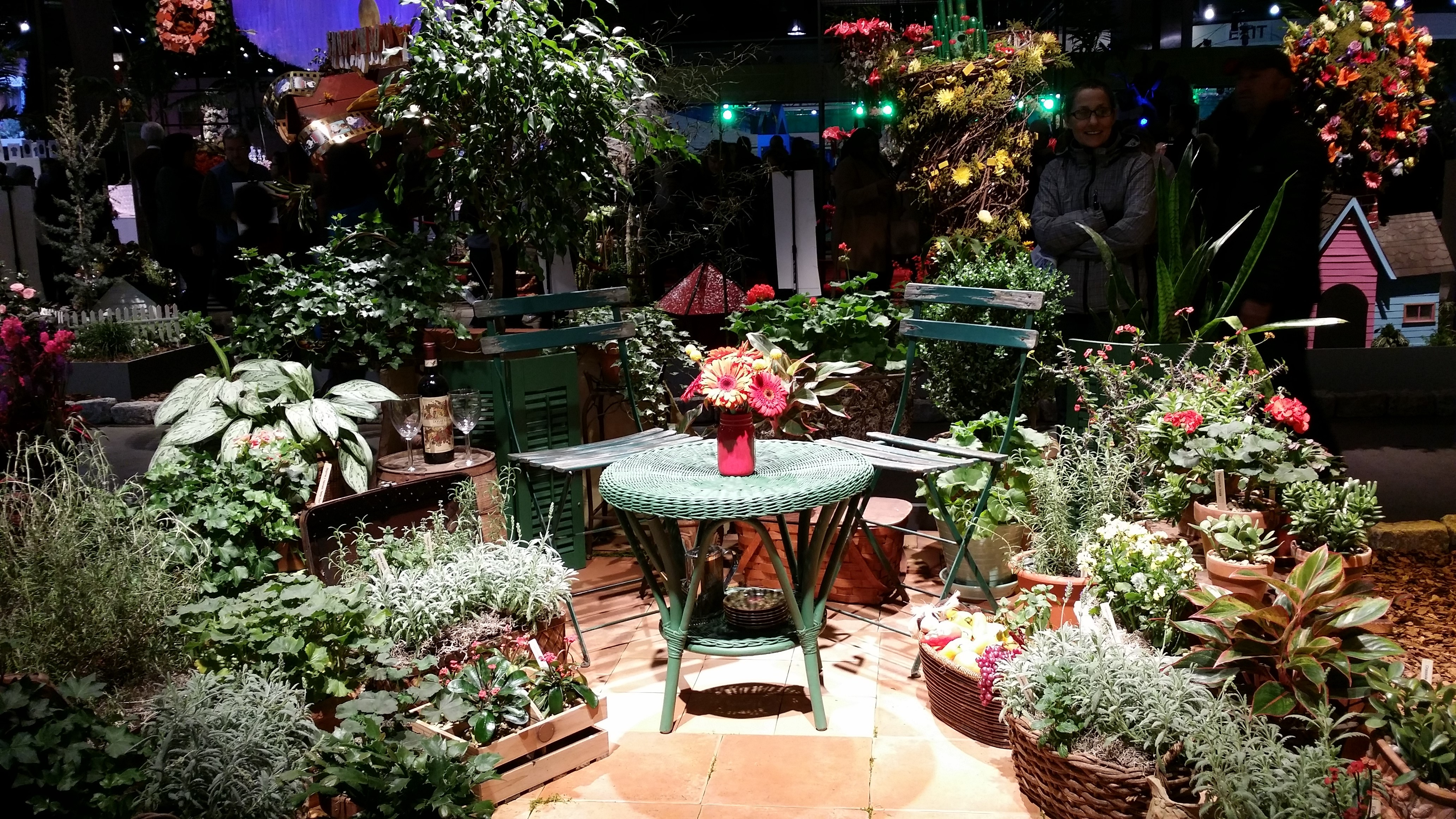
2015 Philadelphia Flower Show

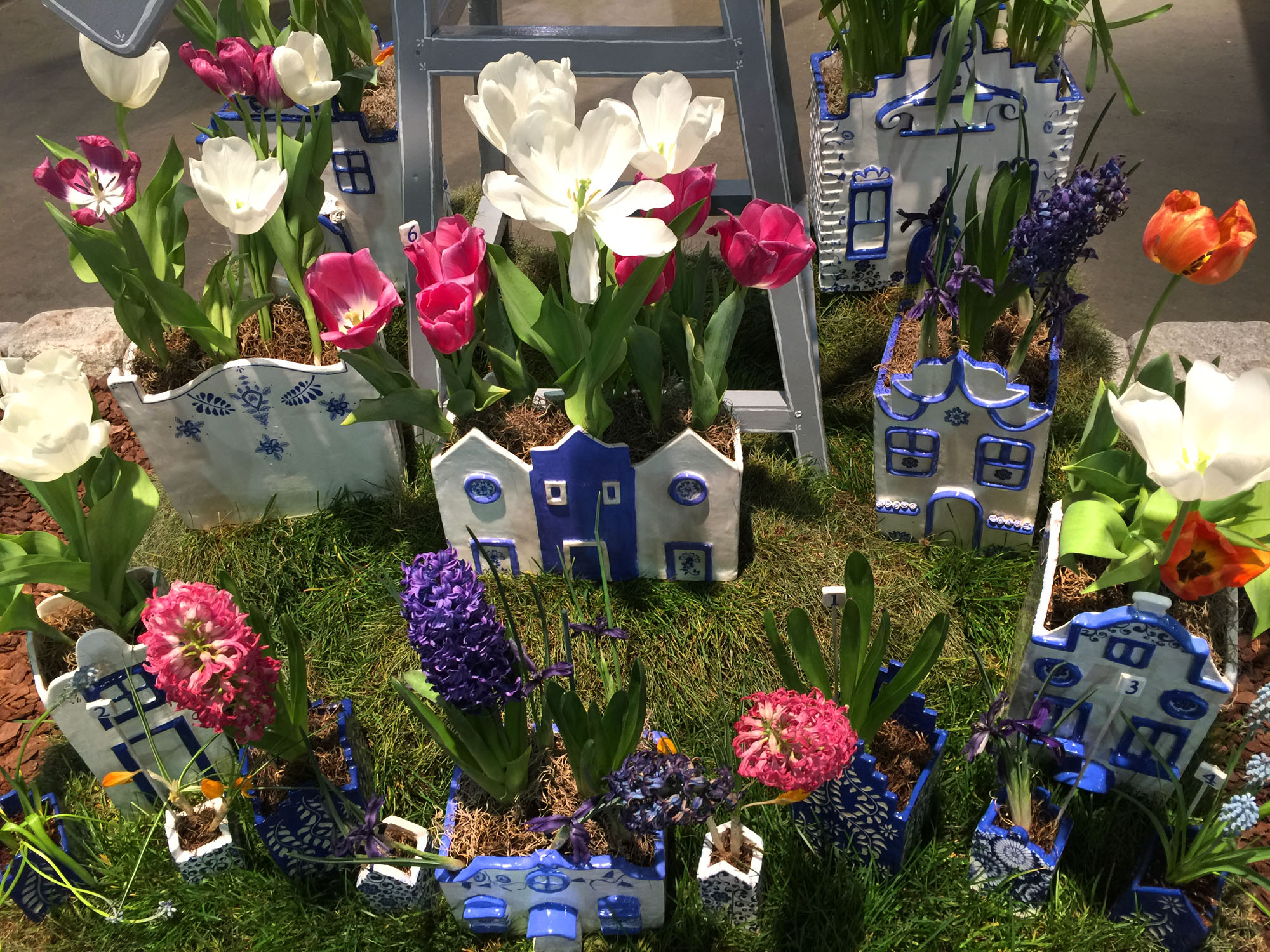
2017 Philadelphia Flower Show
