= List of family relations in American football =

The following is a list of family relations in American football. Please do not add relationships in which members did not make it to a professional sports league.

== List ==
- Adamle – Tony Adamle (father), Mike Adamle (son)
- Adams – Julius Adams (father), Keith Adams (son)
- Adams – Sam Adams Sr. (father), Sam Adams Jr. (son)
- Adams – George Adams (father), Jamal Adams (son)
- Addae – Jahleel Addae, Jahmile Addae (brothers)
- Agnew – Ray Agnew Jr. (father), Ray Agnew III (son)
- Ah You – Junior Ah You (uncle), C. J. Ah You (nephew); Kingsley Suamataia (nephew of C. J.)
- Aldridge – Allen Aldridge Sr. (father), Allen Aldridge Jr. (son)
- Alford – Bruce Alford Sr. (father), Bruce Alford Jr. (son)
- Alt – John Alt (father), Joe Alt (son)
- Anderson – Flipper Anderson (father), Dres Anderson (son)
- Atkinson – George Atkinson Jr. (father), George Atkinson III (son)
- Ayodele – Akin Ayodele, Remi Ayodele (brothers)
- Ayanbadejo – Obafemi Ayanbadejo, Brendon Ayanbadejo (brothers)
- Bahr – Chris Bahr, Matt Bahr (brothers)
- Bailey – Champ Bailey, Boss Bailey (brothers)
- Bakhtiari – Eric Bakhtiari, David Bakhtiari (brothers)
- Barber – Ronde Barber, Tiki Barber (twin brothers)
- Barber – Marion Barber Jr. (father); Marion Barber III, Dominique Barber (sons)
- Belichick – Steve Belichick (father); Bill Belichick (son); Stephen Belichick, Brian Belichick (grandsons)
- Bennett – Michael Bennett, Martellus Bennett (brothers)
- Berry – Eric Berry, Evan Berry (brothers)
- Billups – Lewis K. Billups, Jr., Terry M. Billups (brothers)^{[20]}
- Blackwood – Lyle Blackwood, Glenn Blackwood (brothers)
- Blades – Bennie Blades, Brian Blades (brothers), H.B. Blades (son of Bennie)
- Blanton − Jerry Blanton (father), Kendall Blanton (son)
- Bolden/Pitts – Brandon Bolden and Frank Pitts (grandson and grandfather)
- Bosa/Kumerow – John Bosa (father), Eric Kumerow (brother-in-law), Joey Bosa (son of John, nephew of Eric), Nick Bosa (son of John, nephew of Eric), Jake Kumerow (son of Eric, nephew of John, cousin of Joey and Nick)
- Bowden – Bobby Bowden (father); Tommy Bowden, Jeff Bowden, Terry Bowden (sons).
- Bradshaw – Terry Bradshaw, Craig Bradshaw (brothers)
- Brohm - Jeff Brohm, Brian Brohm, (brothers)
- Brown - Chase Brown, Sydney Brown (identical twin brothers)
- Brown – Orlando Brown (father), Orlando Brown Jr. (son)
- Brown/Thompkins – Eddie Brown (father), Antonio Brown (son), Kenbrell Thompkins (cousin of Antonio), Marquise Brown (cousin of Antonio)
- Burns/McClover – Stanley McClover, Brian Burns (brothers)
- Bush – Devin Bush (father), Devin Bush Jr. (son)
- Butkus – Dick Butkus (uncle), Luke Butkus (nephew)
- Byrd – Gill Byrd (father), Jairus Byrd (son)
- Caldwell – Andre Caldwell, Reche Caldwell (brothers)
- Carlson – Anders Carlson (American football) (Placekicker), Daniel Carlson (Placekicker) (brothers)
- Carpenter – Rob Carpenter (father), Bobby Carpenter (son)
- Carr/Boyett – David Carr, Derek Carr (brothers); Lon Boyett (uncle)
- Carter – Cris Carter (father), Duron Carter (son)
- Cash – Keith Cash, Kerry Cash (brothers)
- Castille – Jeremiah Castille (father), Simeon Castille, Tim Castille (sons)
- Caterbone – Mike Caterbone, Thomas Caterbone (brothers)
- Celek – Brent Celek, Garrett Celek (brothers)
- Chickillo – Nick Chickillo (father), Tony Chickillo (son), Anthony Chickillo (grandson)
- Chubb – Bradley Chubb, Brandon Chubb (brothers); Nick Chubb (cousin)
- Clark – Monte Clark (father), Bryan Clark (son)
- Clausen – Casey Clausen, Jimmy Clausen, Rick Clausen (brothers)
- Clayton/Cain – Michael Clayton, Noah Cain (cousins)
- Cline – Tony Cline (father); Tony Cline Jr. (son)
- Coffman – Paul Coffman (father), Chase Coffman (son)
- Colquitt – Craig Colquitt, Jimmy Colquitt (brothers); Britton Colquitt, Dustin Colquitt (brothers, sons of Craig, nephews of Jimmy)
- Cook – Dalvin Cook, James Cook (brothers)
- Cox – Bryan Cox (father), Bryan Cox Jr. (son)
- Cromartie/Rodgers-Cromartie – Antonio Cromartie (cousin of Dominique & Marcus), Dominique Rodgers-Cromartie, Marcus Cromartie (cousin of Dominique & Antonio), Isaiah Rodgers (cousin of Dominique)
- Crumpler – Alge Crumpler, Carlester Crumpler (brothers)
- Cummings – Ed Cummings (father), Joe Cummings (son)
- Cunningham – Sam Cunningham, Randall Cunningham (brothers)
- Daniels – LeShun Daniels Sr. (father), LeShun Daniels (brother), James Daniels (brother)
- Davis – Vernon Davis, Vontae Davis (brothers)
- Dawkins – Brian Dawkins (uncle), Dalyn Dawkins (nephew)
- DeOssie – Steve DeOssie (father), Zak DeOssie (son)
- Derby – Glenn Derby (uncle), A. J. Derby (nephew)
- Detmer – Ty Detmer, Koy Detmer (brothers)
- Diggs – Stefon Diggs, Trevon Diggs (brothers)
- Dimitroff – Tom Dimitroff (father), Thomas Dimitroff (son)
- Dixon – Brian Dixon, Brandon Dixon (twin brothers)
- Dixon/Ingram – Moochie Dixon, Keaontay Ingram (brothers)
- Donelli – Aldo Donelli; Allen Donelli (brothers)
- Dorsett – Tony Dorsett (father), Anthony Dorsett (son)
- Downs - Josh Downs, Caleb Downs (Brothers)
- Eck - Jason Eck (father), Jaxton Eck (son)
- Edmunds – Ferrell Edmunds (father) Trey Edmunds (brother), Tremaine Edmunds (brother), Terrell Edmunds (brother)
- Edwards – Mario Edwards (father), Mario Edwards Jr. (son)
- Ellington – Andre Ellington, Bruce Ellington (cousins)
- Ellison – Riki Ellison (father), Rhett Ellison (son)
- Elliss – Luther Elliss (father), Kaden Elliss (brother), Christian Elliss (brother), Noah Elliss (brother), & Jonah Elliss (brother)
- Elway – Jack Elway (father), John Elway (son)
- Etienne - Travis Etienne, Trevor Etienne (brothers)
- Fahnhorst – Keith Fahnhorst, Jim Fahnhorst (brothers)
- Farmer – George Farmer (father), Danny Farmer (son)
- Farr – Mel Farr (father); Mel Farr Jr., Mike Farr (sons)
- Fassel – Jim Fassel (father), John Fassel (son)
- Fatukasi – Folorunso Fatukasi, Olakunle Fatukasi (brothers)
- Fede/Estimé – Terrence Fede, Audric Estimé (cousins)
- Fells – Daniel Fells, Darren Fells (brothers)
- Ferguson – Blake Ferguson, Reid Ferguson (brothers)
- Fields – Mark Fields (father), Mark Fields II (son)
- Flacco – Joe Flacco, Mike Flacco, Tom Flacco (brothers)
- Fletcher – Bryan Fletcher, Terrell Fletcher (brothers)
- Floyd – Malcolm Floyd, Malcom Floyd (brothers)
- Fuller – Vincent Fuller, Corey Fuller, Kyle Fuller, Kendall Fuller (brothers)
- Fuller – Devin Fuller, Jordan Fuller (brothers)
- Garrett – Jim Garrett (grandfather), Jason Garrett, Judd Garrett, John Garrett (sons), Harry Flaherty Jr. (grandson), Harry Flaherty Sr. (son-in-law)
- Gbaja-Biamila – Kabeer Gbaja-Biamila, Akbar Gbaja-Biamila (brothers)
- Gaffney – Derrick Gaffney (father), Jabar Gaffney (son)
- Geathers – Robert Geathers Sr., Jumpy Geathers (brothers); Robert Geathers Jr., Clifton Geathers, Kwame Geathers (sons of Robert Sr.), Clayton Geathers (son of Jumpy), Jeremy Geathers (cousin of the Geathers')
- Gerhart – Toby Gerhart, Garth Gerhart (brothers)
- Gilbert – Gale Gilbert (father), Garrett Gilbert (son)
- Glasgow – Graham Glasgow, Ryan Glasgow, Jordan Glasgow (brothers)
- Gogolak – Pete Gogolak, Charlie Gogolak (brothers)
- Golic – Bob Golic, Mike Golic (brothers), Mike Golic Jr. (nephew of Bob, son of Mike)
- Gore – Frank Gore (father); Frank Gore Jr. (son)
- Gramatica – Martín Gramática, Bill Gramatica (brothers)
- Grange – Garland Grange, Red Grange (brothers)
- Green – A. J. Green, T. J. Green (cousins)
- Griese – Bob Griese (father); Brian Griese (son)
- Griffin – Shaquem Griffin, Shaquill Griffin (twin brothers)
- Gronkowski – Rob Gronkowski, Dan Gronkowski, Chris Gronkowski, Glenn Gronkowski (brothers)
- Gruden – Jon Gruden, Jay Gruden (brothers)
- Hager – Britt Hager (father), Bryce Hager (son)
- Hakim – Az-Zahir Hakim, Saalim Hakim (brothers)
- Hambrick – Darren Hambrick, Troy Hambrick (brothers)
- Hannah – Herb Hannah (father); John Hannah, Charley Hannah (sons)
- Harbaugh – Jack Harbaugh (father); John Harbaugh (son), Jim Harbaugh (son); Jay Harbaugh (son of Jim and nephew of John)
- Harper – Devin Harper, Thomas Harper (brothers)
- Harrell – James Harrell (father); Jaylen Harrell (son)
- Harrison – Marvin Harrison (father); Marvin Harrison Jr. (son)
- Hasselbeck – Don Hasselbeck (father); Matt Hasselbeck, Tim Hasselbeck (sons)
- Hatten – Hayden Hatten, Hogan Hatten (twin brothers)
- Haynes – Marcus Haynes, Christian Haynes (brothers)
- Hennessy – Matt Hennessy, Thomas Hennessy (brothers)
- Henderson – E. J. Henderson, Erin Henderson (brothers)
- Heyward – Craig Heyward (father); Cameron Heyward and Connor Heyward (brothers)
- Highsmith – Alonzo Highsmith (father), Alonzo Highsmith Jr. (son)
- Hilgenberg – Jerry Hilgenberg (father); Wally Hilgenberg (brother); Jay Hilgenberg, Joel Hilgenberg (sons of Jerry)
- Hochuli – Ed Hochuli (father); Shawn Hochuli (son) (family of referees)
- Holt – Terrence Holt, Torry Holt (brothers)
- Hopkins - Brad Hopkins (father), Brycen Hopkins (son)
- Horn – Joe Horn (father); Joe Horn Jr. Jaycee Horn (sons)
- Huard – Damon Huard, Brock Huard (brothers)
- Hutchinson – Chris Hutchinson (father), Aidan Hutchinson (son)
- Ihenacho – Carl Ihenacho, Duke Ihenacho (brothers)
- Ika/Toia – Siaki Ika, Jay Toia, Soane Toia (brothers)
- Ingram – Mark Ingram Sr. (father), Mark Ingram II (son)
- Ismail – Raghib Ismail, Qadry Ismail, and Sulaiman Ismail (brothers); Qadir Ismail son of Qadry, nephew of Raghib and Sulaiman.
- Jefferson – Shawn Jefferson (father), Van Jefferson (son)
- Jenkins – Kris Jenkins, Cullen Jenkins (brothers), Kris Jenkins Jr. (son of Kris)
- Jerry – John Jerry, Peria Jerry (brothers)
- Johnson/Thomas - Keyshawn Johnson (uncle), Michael Thomas (nephew)
- Johnson/Anoa'i - Dwayne Johnson, Joe Anoa'i (cousins)
- Jones – Jerry Jones (father); Jerry Jones Jr., Stephen Jones, Charlotte Jones Anderson (children)
- Jones – Julius Jones, Thomas Jones (brothers)
- Jones – Robert Jones (father); Cayleb Jones, Vi Jones, Zay Jones (brothers)
- Jones-Drew/Ward – Maurice Jones-Drew, T. J. Ward (cousins)
- Jordan – Steve Jordan (father), Cameron Jordan (son)
- Joseph – Mickey Joseph, Vance Joseph, Sammy Joseph (brothers)
- Kalil – Ryan Kalil, Matt Kalil (brothers)
- Kamara – Amara Kamara, Mohamed Kamara (brothers)
- Karras – Lou Karras, Ted Karras, Alex Karras (brothers), Ted Karras, Jr (son of Ted) and Ted Karras III (son of Ted, Jr; grandson of Ted)
- Kearse/Buchanon – Jevon Kearse (uncle), Jayron Kearse (nephew), Phillip Buchanon (cousin of Jayron)
- Kelce – Jason Kelce, Travis Kelce (brothers)
- Kelly - Jim Kelly, Chad Kelly (nephew)
- Kendall – Pete Kendall (father), Drew Kendall (son)
- Kendricks – Mychal Kendricks, Eric Kendricks (brothers)
- Kiffin – Monte Kiffin (father), Lane Kiffin (son), Chris Kiffin (son)
- Kitna - Jon Kitna (father), Jalen Kitna (son), JT Kitna (son)
- Klecko - Joe Klecko (father), Dan Klecko (son)
- Kuechenberg – Rudy Kuechenberg, Bob Kuechenberg (brothers)
- Kupp – Jake Kupp (father), Craig Kupp (son), Cooper Kupp (grandson)
- Landry – Dawan Landry, LaRon Landry (brothers)
- LaFleur - Matt Lafleur, Mike LaFleur (brothers)
- Lattner/Spillane – Johnny Lattner, Robert Spillane (grandfather and grandson)
- Leggett – Earl Leggett (father), Brad Leggett (son)
- Lindstrom – Chris Lindstrom (son), Alec Lindstrom (brother to Chris Jr), Chris Lindstrom Sr. (father), Eric Lindstrom (uncle), Dave Lindstrom (uncle)
- Little – Larry Little, David Little (brothers)
- Lombardi – Michael Lombardi (father); Matt Lombardi, Mick Lombardi (brothers)
- Lombardi – Vince Lombardi (grandfather); Joe Lombardi (grandson)
- Long – Howie Long (father); Chris Long, Kyle Long (sons)
- Lott/Nece – Ronnie Lott (father), Ryan Nece (son)
- Luck – Oliver Luck (father), Andrew Luck (son)
- Lusk – Herbert H. Lusk, Hendrick Hamilton Lusk, Harold Hollingsworth Lusk, (brothers)
- Lynch – Bill Lynch (father), Joey Lynch (son), Kevin Lynch (son)
- Lynch/Johnson/Russell – Marshawn Lynch; Josh Johnson, JaMarcus Russell (cousins)
- Madden - John Madden (grandfather), Jesse Madden (grandson)
- Manning – Archie Manning (father); Peyton Manning, Eli Manning, Cooper Manning (sons), Arch Manning (son of Cooper)
- Marion – Jerry Marion (father), Brock Marion (son)
- Martin – Doug Martin, George Martin (brothers)
- Martin – Nick Martin, Zack Martin (brothers)
- Mayo – Deron Mayo, Jerod Mayo (brothers)
- Mays – Stafford Mays (father), Taylor Mays (son)
- Matthews/Niklas – Clay Matthews Sr. (father); Clay Matthews Jr., Bruce Matthews (sons), Clay Matthews III, Kevin Matthews, Casey Matthews, Jake Matthews, Mike Matthews (grandsons), Troy Niklas (Bruce Matthews' nephew)
- McAlister – James McAlister (father), Chris McAlister (son)
- McCaffrey – Ed McCaffrey (father); Max McCaffrey, Christian McCaffrey, Dylan McCaffrey, Luke McCaffrey (sons)
- McClendon – Willie McClendon (father), Bryan McClendon (son)
- McCollum - Tristin McCollum, Zyon McCollum (twin brothers)
- McCourty – Devin McCourty, Jason McCourty (identical twin brothers)
- McCown – Josh McCown, Luke McCown (brothers)
- McCutcheon – Lawrence McCutcheon (father), Daylon McCutcheon (son)
- McDaniels – Ben McDaniels, Josh McDaniels (brothers)
- McDonald – Tim McDonald (father); T. J. McDonald, Tevin McDonald (sons)
- McDougle – Jerome McDougle, Stockar McDougle (brothers)
- McFadden – Darren McFadden-Reggie Swinton (Cousins)
- McKay – John McKay (father), John McKay Jr., Rich McKay (sons)
- McKay – Matthew McKay, Timothy McKay (brothers)
- McKenzie – Raleigh McKenzie, Reggie McKenzie (twin brothers)
- McKinney – Steve McKinney, Seth McKinney (brothers)
- McMillan – Ernie McMillan (father), Erik McMillan (son)
- McTyer – Tim McTyer (father), Torry McTyer (son)
- McVay − John McVay (grandfather), Sean McVay (grandson)
- Melton – Bo Melton, Max Melton (brothers)
- Metcalf – Terry Metcalf (father of Eric), Eric Metcalf (cousin to Terrence) Terrence Metcalf (father of DK), Tarrus Metcalf (son of Terry), DK Metcalf (son of Terrence), TJ Metcalf, Tevis Metcalf (sons of Tarrus),
- Michel – Marken Michel, Sony Michel (brothers)
- Mickens – Ray Mickens (father), R. J. Mickens (son)
- Mike-Mayer – Nick Mike-Mayer, Steve Mike-Mayer (brothers)
- Montgomery– Wilbert Montgomery, Cle Montgomery, Tyrone Montgomery, Fred Montgomery (brothers)
- Moore – A. J. Moore, C. J. Moore (brothers)
- Moorehead – Emery Moorehead (father), Aaron Moorehead (son)
- Mora – Jim E. Mora (father), Jim L. Mora (son)
- Moss – Eric Moss, Randy Moss (brothers), Thaddeus Moss (son of Randy, nephew of Eric)
- Moss – Santana Moss, Sinorice Moss (brothers)
- Mullen/Jackson - Travyon Mullen, Tiawan Mullen, Trevell Mullen (brothers), Lamar Jackson (cousin)
- Murphy – Grayson Murphy, Gabriel Murphy (twin brothers)
- Murray – Kevin Murray (father), Kyler Murray (son)
- Nabers – Malik Nabers (nephew), Gabe Nabers (uncle)
- Nacua/Liufau – Kai Nacua, Puka Nacua, Samson Nacua (brothers), Marist Liufau (cousin)
- Nassib – Carl Nassib, Ryan Nassib (brothers)
- Neal – Mike Neal, Ryan Neal (brothers)
- Nesser – Al Nesser, Frank Nesser, Fred Nesser, John Nesser, Phil Nesser, Ted Nesser (brothers), Charlie Nesser (son of Ted)
- Neuheisel - Rick Neuheisel (father), Jerry Neuheisel (son)
- Newhouse – Robert Newhouse (father), Reggie Newhouse (son)
- Newton – Cam Newton, Cecil Newton (brothers)
- Nix/Johnson – Patrick Nix (father), Bo Nix, Tez Johnson (brothers)
- Nolan – Dick Nolan (father), Mike Nolan (son)
- Ogden – Jonathan Ogden, Marques Ogden (brothers)
- Okwara – Julian Okwara, Romeo Okwara (brothers)
- Oladokun – Chris Oladokun, Jordan Oladokun (brothers)
- Olsen – Merlin Olsen, Orrin Olsen, Phil Olsen (brothers)
- Pagano – Chuck Pagano, John Pagano (brothers)
- Paganelli- Carl Paganelli, Sr., Father, Dino Paganelli, Carl Paganelli, Jr., Perry Paganelli (sons all officiated in the NFL, Father worked in NCAA)
- Palmer – Carson Palmer, Jordan Palmer (brothers)
- Papale – Vince Papale (father), Vinny Papale (son)
- Paul – Chris Paul, Patrick Paul (brothers)
- Payton – Eddie Payton, Walter Payton (brothers); Jarrett Payton (son of Walter)
- Peko – Domata Peko, Tupe Peko (brothers), Kyle Peko (cousin)
- Perkins – Don Perkins (great-uncle), Paul Perkins (great-nephew)
- Perriman – Brett Perriman (father), Breshad Perriman (son)
- Perry – Michael Dean Perry, William Perry (brothers)
- Petrino – Bobby Petrino, Paul Petrino (brothers)
- Phillips – Bum Phillips (father), Wade Phillips (son), Wes Phillips (grandson)
- Polamalu − Troy Polamalu (nephew), Kennedy Polamalu (uncle)
- Pouncey – Maurkice Pouncey, Mike Pouncey (twin brothers)
- Pyle/Kumerow – Palmer Pyle (father), Eric Kumerow (son), Jake Kumerow (grandson)
- Pyne – George Pyne II (father), George Pyne III (son), Jim Pyne (grandson)
- Quessenberry – David Quessenberry, Paul Quessenberry, Scott Quessenberry (brothers)
- Randle – Ervin Randle, John Randle (brothers)
- Reed – Brooks Reed, Lucas Reed (brothers)
- Reed/Carter – Jake Reed, Dale Carter (brothers)
- Reeder – Dan Reeder (father), Troy Reeder (son)
- Reid – Eric Reid, Justin Reid (brothers)
- Rice/Matthews – Jerry Rice (father), Jerry Rice Jr. (son), Brenden Rice (son); Jordan Matthews (first cousin once removed to Jerry Rice, second cousin to Jerry Rice Jr.)
- Richardson – Willie Richardson, Gloster Richardson, Tom Richardson, Ernie Richardson
- Ridley – Calvin Ridley, Riley Ridley (brothers)
- Rivera – Ron Rivera (uncle), Vincent Rivera (nephew)
- Robiskie – Terry Robiskie (father), Andrew Robiskie, Brian Robiskie (sons)
- Robinson – Marcus Robinson (uncle), Demarcus Robinson (nephew)
- Rodgers – Aaron Rodgers, Jordan Rodgers (brothers)
- Rodgers – Richard Rodgers Sr. (father), Richard Rodgers II (son)
- Rourke - Nathan Rourke, Kurtis Rourke (brothers)
- Ryan – Buddy Ryan (father); Rex Ryan, Rob Ryan (twin sons), Seth Ryan (son of Rex and nephew of Rob)
- Ryan/McGlinchey – Matt Ryan, Mike McGlinchey (cousins)
- Salaam – Sulton Salaam (father); Rashaan Salaam (son)
- Sanders' - Deion Sanders (father)Shedeur Sanders, Shilo Sanders (brothers)
- Sauer – George Sauer (father); George Sauer Jr. (son)
- Saul – Bill Saul, Rich Saul, Ron Saul (brothers, Rich and Ron twins)
- Schwartz – Geoff Schwartz; Mitchell Schwartz (brothers)
- Selmon – Dewey Selmon, Lee Roy Selmon (brothers)
- Sewell – Nephi Sewell, Noah Sewell, Penei Sewell (brothers), Richard Brown, Isaac Sopoaga (uncles); Kingsley Suamataia (cousin of the Sewells)
- Shanahan – Mike Shanahan (father), Kyle Shanahan (son)
- Sharpe – Sterling Sharpe, Shannon Sharpe (brothers)
- Sharper – Jamie Sharper, Darren Sharper (brothers).
- Shepard – Darrell Shepard and Derrick Shepard (brothers); Sterling Shepard (son of Derrick)
- Shula – Don Shula (father); Dave Shula, Mike Shula (sons); Chris Shula (son of Dave).
- Shuler – Mickey Shuler (father), Mickey Shuler Jr. (son)
- Simms – Chris Simms, Matt Simms (brothers); Phil Simms (father)
- Slater – Jackie Slater (father), Matthew Slater (son)
- Slay/Walker – Darius Slay, Tracy Walker (second cousins)
- Smith – Rod Smith, Jaylon Smith (brothers)
- Smith – Malcolm Smith, Steve Smith (brothers)
- Smith – Maurice Smith, Ainias Smith (brothers)
- Spikes – Brandon Spikes, Takeo Spikes (cousins)
- St. Brown – Amon-Ra St. Brown, Equanimeous St. Brown
- Stoops – Bob Stoops, Mike Stoops, Mark Stoops (brothers)
- Stutzmann – Craig Stutzmann, Billy Ray Stutzmann (brothers)
- Styles – Lorenzo Styles (father), Lorenzo Styles Jr., Sonny Styles (sons)
- Sudfeld – Nate Sudfeld, Zach Sudfeld (brothers)
- Suhey – Steve Suhey (father), Matt Suhey (son)
- Surtain – Patrick Surtain (father), Patrick Surtain II (son)
- Tagovailoa – Tua Tagovailoa, Taulia Tagovailoa (brothers); Myron Tagovailoa-Amosa (cousin)
- Talbert – Don Talbert, Diron Talbert (brothers)
- Talley – Darryl Talley, John Talley (brothers)
- Tatupu – Mosi Tatupu (father), Lofa Tatupu (son)
- Taylor – Fred Taylor (father), Kelvin Taylor (son)
- Taylor – Jason Taylor (father), Mason Taylor (son)
- Trotter/Ganaway – Jeremiah Trotter (father), Jeremiah Trotter Jr. (son), Josiah Trotter (son), Terrance Ganaway (nephew of Jeremiah Trotter)
- Trufant – Desmond Trufant, Isaiah Trufant, Marcus Trufant (brothers)
- Tuiasosopo – Manu Tuiasosopo (father), Marques Tuiasosopo (son)
- Turk – Matt Turk, Dan Turk (brothers)Michael Turk (nephew)
- Turner – Norv Turner, Ron Turner (brothers), Scott Turner (son of Norv), Cameron Turner (son of Ron)
- Tuttle – Perry Tuttle (uncle), Shy Tuttle (nephew)
- Upshaw – Gene Upshaw, Marvin Upshaw (brothers)
- Urlacher – Brian Urlacher, Casey Urlacher (brothers), Kennedy Urlacher (son of Brian)
- Van Buren – Steve Van Buren, Ebert Van Buren (brothers)
- Vereen – Shane Vereen, Brock Vereen (brothers)
- Vick/Brooks – Michael Vick, Marcus Vick (brothers); Aaron Brooks (cousin to the Vicks)
- Vrabel – Mike Vrabel (father); Tyler Vrabel (son)
- Ward – Terron Ward, T. J. Ward (brothers)
- Washington – Ted Washington Sr. (father), Ted Washington Jr. (son)
- Watkins – Jaylen Watkins, Sammy Watkins (brothers)
- Watt – J. J. Watt, Derek Watt, T. J. Watt (brothers)
- Wayne – Reggie Wayne, Jalen Wayne (cousins)
- Westbrook – Brian Westbrook, Byron Westbrook (brothers)
- Whittingham - Fred Whittingham (father), Kyle Whittingham (son), Cary Whittingham (son)
- Whitehurst – David Whitehurst (father), Charlie Whitehurst (son)
- Williams – Quinnen Williams, Quincy Williams (brothers)
- Williams – Bennett Williams, Evan Williams (brothers)
- Williams – Jermaine Williams (father), Josh Williams (son)
- Wilson – George Wilson (father), George Wilson Jr. (son)
- Wilson - Cedrick Wilson (father), Cedrick Wilson Jr. (son)
- Winfield – Antoine Winfield (father), Antoine Winfield Jr. (son)
- Winslow – George Winslow (father); Ryan Winslow (son)
- Winslow – Kellen Winslow (father); Kellen Winslow II (son)
- Wisniewski – Leo Wisniewski, Steve Wisniewski (brothers), Stefen Wisniewski (son of Leo, nephew of Steve)
- Young – Willie Young (father); Rodney Young (son)
- Zendejas – Luis Zendejas, Max Zendejas, Joaquin Zendejas (brothers), Marty Zendejas, Tony Zendejas (brothers) (groups of brothers are cousins to each other)
- Zimmer – Mike Zimmer (father), Adam Zimmer (son)
- Whittington-Arthur Whittington (Uncle), Jordan Whittington (Nephew)

== See also ==
- List of professional sports families
- List of second-generation National Football League players
- List of association football (soccer) families
  - List of African association football families
  - List of European association football families
    - List of English association football families
    - List of former Yugoslavia association football families
    - List of Scottish football families
    - List of Spanish association football families
  - Category:Association football families
- List of Australian rules football families
- List of second-generation Major League Baseball players
- List of second-generation National Basketball Association players
- List of boxing families
- List of chess families
- List of International cricket families
- List of family relations in the National Hockey League
- List of family relations in rugby league
- List of international rugby union families
- List of professional wrestling families
