= Nesser =

Nesser is a surname. Notable people with the surname include:

- Al Nesser (1893–1967), American football player
- Charlie Nesser (1902–1970), American football player
- Frank Nesser (1889–1953), American football player
- Fred Nesser (1887–1967), American football player
- Håkan Nesser (born 1950), Swedish author and teacher
- John Nesser (1876–1931), German-American American football player
- Phil Nesser (1880–1959), German-American American football player
- Ray Nesser (1898–1969), American football player
- Ted Nesser (1883–1941), American football player-coach

== See also ==
- Nesser brothers
- Ness (surname)
- Nesser, Louisiana
