= List of NFL players (N) =

This is a list of players who have appeared in at least one regular season or postseason game in the National Football League (NFL), American Football League (AFL), or All-America Football Conference (AAFC) and have a last name that starts with "N". This list is accurate through the end of the 2025 NFL season.

== Na–Nem ==
- Legedu Naanee
- Gabe Nabers
- Malik Nabers
- Roland Nabors
- Andy Nacrelli
- Kai Nacua
- Puka Nacua
- Jesse Nading
- Peaches Nadolney
- Chris Naeole
- Dana Nafziger
- Ray Nagel
- Ross Nagel
- Chris Naggar
- Browning Nagle
- Johnny Nagle
- Gern Nagler
- Bronko Nagurski
- Bill Nagy
- Jalen Nailor
- Jamie Nails
- John Naioti
- Ralph Nairan
- Rob Nairne
- Peter Najarian
- Haruki Nakamura
- John Nalbone
- Tom Nalen
- Craig Nall
- Ryan Nall
- Joe Namath
- Dimitri Nance
- Jim Nance
- Martin Nance
- Terna Nande
- Walter Napier
- Bob Naponic
- Eric Naposki
- Nick Nardacci
- Dick Nardi
- Brayden Narveson
- Bob Nash
- Damien Nash
- Joe Nash
- Kenny Nash
- Keyon Nash
- Marcus Nash
- Tom Nash
- Zack Nash
- Hamsah Nasirildeen
- Jack Nason
- Carl Nassib
- Ryan Nassib
- Tony Nathan
- Brian Natkin
- Andy Natowich
- JoJo Natson
- Michael Nattiel
- Ricky Nattiel
- Fred Naumetz
- Paul Naumoff
- Johnny Naumu
- Isaac Nauta
- Jeremy Navarre
- John Navarre
- Steve Nave
- Hannibal Navies
- Durell Nchami
- Haggai Ndubuisi
- Ikechuku Ndukwe
- Nedu Ndukwe
- Clem Neacy
- Spencer Nead
- Dan Neal
- Devin Neal
- Ed Neal
- Elias Neal
- Evan Neal
- Frankie Neal
- Keanu Neal
- Leon Neal
- Lewis Neal
- Lorenzo Neal
- Louis Neal
- Mike Neal
- Randy Neal
- Ray Neal
- Richard Neal
- Ryan Neal
- Siran Neal
- Speedy Neal
- Stephen Neal
- Ray Nealy
- Aaron Neary
- Mike Nease
- Sharrod Neasman
- Andre Neblett
- Ryan Nece
- Tommy Neck
- Derrick Ned
- Larry Ned
- Joe Nedney
- Nik Needham
- Bobby Neely
- Ralph Neely
- Bob Neff
- Fred Negus
- Renaldo Nehemiah
- John Neidert
- Billy Neighbors
- Dallas Neil
- Dan Neil
- Kenny Neil
- Chris Neild
- Bill Neill
- Jim Neill
- Ryan Neill
- Steve Neils
- Cory Nelms
- Mike Nelms
- Bill Nelsen
- Al Nelson
- Andy Nelson
- Anthony Nelson
- Ben Nelson
- Benny Nelson
- Bill Nelson
- Bob Nelson (born 1953)
- Bob Nelson (born 1959)
- Bruce Nelson
- Chuck Nelson
- Corey Nelson
- Darrell Nelson
- Darrin Nelson
- David Nelson (born 1963)
- David Nelson (born 1986)
- Dennis Nelson
- Derrie Nelson
- Don Nelson (born 1903)
- Don Nelson (born 1915)
- Edmund Nelson
- Frank Nelson
- Herb Nelson
- Jack Nelson
- Jerico Nelson
- Jim Nelson
- Jimmy Nelson
- J. J. Nelson
- Jonathan Nelson
- Jordy Nelson
- Karl Nelson
- Kyle Nelson
- Lee Nelson
- Mark Nelson
- Matt Nelson
- Nick Nelson
- Packie Nelson
- Quenton Nelson
- Ralph Nelson
- Reggie Nelson (born 1976)
- Reggie Nelson (born 1983)
- Rhett Nelson
- Robert Nelson (born 1920)
- Robert Nelson (born 1990)
- Shane Nelson
- Shawn Nelson
- Steve Nelson
- Steven Nelson
- Teddy Nelson
- Terry Nelson
- Tom Nelson
- Andy Nemecek
- Jerry Nemecek
- Steve Nemeth
- Ted Nemzek

== Ner–Nj ==
- Carl Nery
- Ron Nery
- Jamar Nesbit
- Dick Nesbitt
- Nate Ness
- Al Nesser
- Charlie Nesser
- Frank Nesser
- Fred Nesser
- John Nesser
- Phil Nesser
- Ted Nesser
- Bill Netherton
- Doug Nettles
- Jim Nettles
- Keith Neubert
- Ryan Neufeld
- Rick Neuheisel
- Quentin Neujahr
- Bob Neuman
- Tom Neumann
- Ryan Neuzil
- Ernie Nevers
- Elijah Nevett
- Tom Neville (born 1943)
- Tom Neville (born 1961)
- Drake Nevis
- Bill Newashe
- Jeremy Newberry
- Tom Newberry
- Richard Newbill
- Steve Newell
- Marshall Newhouse
- Reggie Newhouse
- Robert Newhouse
- Robert Newkirk
- Bob Newland
- Harry Newland
- Anthony Newman
- Ed Newman
- Harry Newman (born 1897)
- Harry Newman (born 1909)
- Keith Newman
- Luke Newman
- Obie Newman
- Pat Newman
- Royce Newman
- Terence Newman
- Tim Newman
- Xavier Newman-Johnson
- Don Newmeyer
- Tony Newsom
- Billy Newsome
- Craig Newsome
- Dazz Newsome
- Detrez Newsome
- Greg Newsome II
- Harry Newsome
- Jamar Newsome
- Jonathan Newsome
- Ozzie Newsome
- Richard Newsome
- Timmy Newsome
- Vince Newsome
- Kendall Newson
- Tony Newson
- Bob Newton
- Cam Newton (born 1982)
- Cam Newton (born 1989)
- Charles Newton
- Derek Newton
- Jim Newton
- Johnny Newton
- Josh Newton
- Mike Newton
- Nate Newton
- Tim Newton
- Tom Newton
- Isaiah Neyor
- Yannick Ngakoue
- Haloti Ngata
- Dat Nguyen
- Lucas Niang
- Armand Niccolai
- Jim Nicely
- Al Nichelini
- Calvin Nicholas
- Stephen Nicholas
- Allen Nichols
- Bilal Nichols
- Bob Nichols
- Bobby Nichols
- Deatrick Nichols
- Gerald Nichols
- Hamilton Nichols
- John Nichols
- Lew Nichols
- Mark Nichols (born 1956)
- Mark Nichols (born 1959)
- Mike Nichols
- Ralph Nichols
- Rayshad Nichols
- Ricky Nichols
- Robbie Nichols
- Sid Nichols
- A. J. Nicholson
- Calvin Nicholson
- Donte Nicholson
- Frank Nicholson
- Jim Nicholson
- Montae Nicholson
- Elbie Nickel
- Hardy Nickerson
- Hardy Nickerson Jr.
- Parry Nickerson
- Donnie Nickey
- Ed Nickla
- Pete Nicklas
- Carl Nicks
- Hakeem Nicks
- George Nicksich
- Dadi Nicolas
- Scott Nicolas
- Bruno Niedziela
- Fanny Niehaus
- Ralph Niehaus
- Steve Niehaus
- Robert Niehoff
- Gifford Nielsen
- Hans Nielsen
- Walt Nielsen
- Nielson
- Ben Niemann
- Nick Niemann
- Walter Niemann
- Laurie Niemi
- Doug Nienhuis
- John Nies
- Michael Niese
- Nick Nighswander
- Yosh Nijman
- Troy Niklas
- John Niland
- Jerry Niles
- Reed Nilsen
- Rob Ninkovich
- Jim Ninowski
- Maury Nipp
- Dave Nisbet
- John Nisby
- Hunter Niswander
- Rudy Niswanger
- Ray Nitschke
- Björn Nittmo
- Bo Nix
- Doyle Nix
- Emery Nix
- George Nix
- Jack Nix (born 1917)
- Jack Nix (born 1928)
- John Nix
- Kent Nix
- Louis Nix
- Lucas Nix
- Roosevelt Nix (born 1967)
- Roosevelt Nix (born 1992)
- David Nixon
- Daviyon Nixon
- Fred Nixon
- James Nixon
- Jeff Nixon
- Keisean Nixon
- Mike Nixon
- Taurean Nixon
- Tory Nixon
- Xavier Nixon
- Cameron Nizialek
- Bob Niziolek
- David Njoku
- Maema Njongmeta

== Nk–Nz ==
- Chad Nkang
- Elijah Nkansah
- Robert Nkemdiche
- Mathias Nkwenti
- Derrick Nnadi
- Leo Nobile
- Tommy Nobis
- Brandon Noble
- Brian Noble
- Danny Noble
- Dave Noble
- Dick Noble
- Don Noble
- James Noble
- Jim Noble
- Mike Noble
- John Nocera
- George Nock
- Jaylin Noel
- Terry Nofsinger
- Al Noga
- Niko Noga
- Pete Noga
- Dick Nolan
- Earl Nolan
- John Nolan (born 1899)
- John Nolan (born 1926)
- Troy Nolan
- Don Nolander
- Walter Nolen
- Ben Noll
- Chuck Noll
- Ray Nolting
- Leo Nomellini
- Tom Nomina
- Ike Nonnemaker
- Danny Noonan
- Jerry Noonan
- Karl Noonan
- John Noppenberg
- John Norbeck
- Hank Norberg
- John Norby
- Keith Nord
- Fred Nordgren
- Jake Nordin
- Mark Nordquist
- Swede Nordstrom
- Al Norgard
- Erik Norgard
- Reino Nori
- Ben Norman
- Bob Norman
- Chris Norman
- Dennis Norman
- Dick Norman
- Jim Norman
- Joe Norman
- Josh Norman (born 1980)
- Josh Norman (born 1987)
- Pettis Norman
- Tim Norman
- Tony Norman
- Will Norman
- Omarr Norman-Lott
- David Norrie
- Hal Norris
- Jack Norris
- Jared Norris
- Jerome Norris
- Jim Norris
- Jimmy Norris
- Jon Norris
- Moran Norris
- Morice Norris
- Slade Norris
- Trusse Norris
- Ulysses Norris
- Mike Norseth
- Jim North
- John North
- Dennis Northcutt
- Gabe Northern
- Brad Nortman
- Don Norton
- Jerry Norton
- Jim Norton
- Jim Norton
- Ken Norton Jr.
- Marty Norton
- Ray Norton (born 1900)
- Ray Norton (born 1937)
- Rick Norton
- Storm Norton
- Zach Norton
- Jay Norvell
- Andrew Norwell
- Eric Norwood
- Jerious Norwood
- Jordan Norwood
- Kevin Norwood
- Ralph Norwood
- Scott Norwood
- Tre Norwood
- John Nosich
- Joseph Noteboom
- Doug Nott
- Mike Nott
- Dexter Nottage
- Don Nottingham
- Hunter Nourzad
- Jay Novacek
- Eddie Novak
- Jack Novak
- Jeff Novak
- Ken Novak
- Nick Novak
- Craig Novitsky
- Brent Novoselsky
- Ray Novotny
- Joe Novsek
- Drew Nowak
- Gary Nowak
- Walt Nowak
- Trevor Nowaske
- Bob Nowaskey
- Tom Nowatzke
- Len Noyes
- Ty Nsekhe
- Tyler Nubin
- Clem Nugent
- Dan Nugent
- David Nugent
- Mike Nugent
- Phil Nugent
- Terry Nugent
- Keith Null
- Julian Nunamaker
- Rakeem Nunez-Roches
- Frank Nunley
- Jeremy Nunley
- Freddie Joe Nunn
- R.B. Nunnery
- Josh Nurse
- Bob Nussbaumer
- Doug Nussmeier
- Tom Nütten
- Buzz Nutter
- Ed Nutting
- Jerry Nuzum
- Rick Nuzum
- Chip Nuzzo
- Ogemdi Nwagbuo
- Uche Nwaneri
- Kene Nwangwu
- Chukie Nwokorie
- Uchenna Nwosu
- Mally Nydall
- Blaine Nye
- Dick Nyers
- Bernie Nygren
- Lee Nystrom
- Vic Nyvall
- Mark Nzeocha
