= List of NFL players born outside the United States =

Compared to other major professional sports leagues in North America, the National Football League (NFL) has the lowest share of players born outside the United States. In 2017, roughly 3% of active players were born outside the US. In recent drafts, teams have made efforts to search for prospects internationally. The International Player Pathway (IPP) program was introduced by the league in 2017, which allocates non-American players to NFL teams to help develop them.

International athletes have played in the NFL since the league's founding in 1920. There have been 9 foreign-born players inducted into the Pro Football Hall of Fame. Many international players have found success on special teams; two of the three highest scorers in NFL history were foreign born: kickers Morten Andersen of Denmark and Gary Anderson of South Africa. Canada is the all-time most represented foreign country, with 107 players, followed by Germany with 80 players and Jamaica with 40.

== History ==
=== Beginnings ===
At least nine foreign-born players played in the inaugural 1920 NFL season. These included:

- German brothers John Nesser and Phil Nesser for the Columbus Panhandles. They were part of the Nesser Brothers, one of American football's most famous families of the early 20th century.
- Canadian Tommy Hughitt, player-coach for the Buffalo All-Americans. A star quarterback for the Michigan Wolverines football team before joining the NFL, he was named to the 1922 All-Pro Team by George Halas. As Buffalo's head coach, he led the team to 34 wins, 15 losses, and 7 ties from 1920 to 1924.
- Irishman Bob Nash for the Akron Pros. He contributed to several firsts in NFL history, including being the first player to score a touchdown on a fumble recovery and later was the first captain of the New York Giants. He was also part of the first player-trade between league teams when he was sold to the Buffalo All-Americans prior to a game in 1920 for $300 (equivalent to $4,821 in 2025) and five percent of the gate receipts.

=== Latin America ===
The first Latino to play in the NFL was Ignacio Saturnino "Lou" Molinet, a Cuban who signed with the Frankford Yellow Jackets in 1927. His contract was donated to the Pro Football Hall of Fame by his daughter in 2000. Following Molinet were brothers Jess Rodriguez and Kelly Rodriguez of Spain: Jess was a tailback for the Buffalo Bisons in 1929, while Kelly played for the Yellow Jackets and Minneapolis Red Jackets in 1930.

In 1944, the Philadelphia Eagles drafted Steve Van Buren, a halfback born in La Ceiba, Honduras, to an American father and a Spanish mother. He played eight seasons for the Eagles, and retired as the NFL's career leader in rushing attempts, rushing yards, and rushing touchdowns. In 1965, Van Buren became the first Latino inducted into the Pro Football Hall of Fame.

In 1948, the Los Angeles Rams drafted Tom Fears. Fears was born in Guadalajara, Mexico, to an American father and a Mexican mother. He led the Rams' receiving game as a split end from 1948 to 1956, winning an NFL championship with the team in 1951. He later became the first Latino head coach in the history of the league, heading the New Orleans Saints staff from their inauguration in 1967, through the 1970 season. Fears was inducted into the Pro Football Hall of Fame in 1970.

The first Colombian player in the NFL was Jairo Peñaranda, born in 1958 in Barranquilla. He played for the Los Angeles Rams and the Philadelphia Eagles. He would be followed by Fuad Reveiz, born in 1963 in Bogotá. Reveiz played for the Miami Dolphins during the 1985 season, and later for the San Diego Chargers and Minnesota Vikings. During his 11 years as a professional, he scored 188 field goals and 367 extra points.

Martín Gramática, an Argentinian, was selected by the Tampa Bay Buccaneers as a placekicker in the 1999 NFL draft. He later played for the Indianapolis Colts, Dallas Cowboys, and New Orleans Saints. His brother, Bill, was drafted by the Arizona Cardinals in 2001, and would later play for the Miami Dolphins.

Cairo Santos, a Brazilian kicker, is the first NFL player born in Brazil. He currently plays for the Chicago Bears, holding three franchise records. He also holds nine Kansas City Chiefs franchise records. After him, Durval Queiroz spent time with the Miami Dolphins.

Sammis Reyes was the first Chilean to play in the NFL. He signed with the Washington Commanders in 2021 after playing basketball in Chile and played primarily on special teams.

=== Europe ===
Several native Europeans played in the NFL's inaugural 1920 season, including fullback John Barsha of Russia, tackle John Kvist of Sweden, end Bob Nash of Ireland, and brothers John and Phil Nesser from Germany. Later, Bronko Nagurski signed with the Chicago Bears—although born in Canada, he was the son of Ukrainian immigrants and well known for his Ukrainian heritage. Born Bronislau Nagurski, he became renowned for his extraordinary strength and power as a fullback and linebacker for the Bears in the 1930s.

Fullback Ace Gutowsky from Russia played for the Detroit Lions from 1932 to 1938, and became the franchise's career leader in rushing yards. Contemporary sources credit Gutowsky with setting the NFL's career rushing yards record with 3,399 in 1939 as a member of the Brooklyn Dodgers.

In 1950, the San Francisco 49ers used their first draft pick as an NFL franchise on Leo Nomellini, a defensive tackle from the University of Minnesota who was born in Lucca, Italy, and moved to Chicago at a young age. Nomellini played with the 49ers until he retired in 1963 after 10 Pro Bowl invitations and nine All-Pro selections. He was inducted into the Pro Football Hall of Fame in 1969 and the Italian American Sports Hall of Fame in 1979.

Garo Yepremian, born in Larnaca, Cyprus, was a placekicker for the Detroit Lions, Miami Dolphins, New Orleans Saints, and Tampa Bay Buccaneers during a career from 1966 to 1981. He won two Super Bowls and was a two-time Pro Bowl selection with the Dolphins, as well as a first-team kicker on the NFL 1970s All-Decade Team. Yepremian may best be remembered for a blunder during the Dolphins' victory in Super Bowl VII, in which his attempt to pass the ball after a blocked field goal attempt resulted in a fumble returned 49 yards for the Washington Redskins' only touchdown of the game.

Scandinavia has produced the two lone exclusive placekickers in the Pro Football Hall of Fame. Jan Stenerud came from Fetsund, Norway, to the U.S. by way of a skiing scholarship to Montana State University. There he picked up placekicking, and was drafted by the Kansas City Chiefs in the 1966 AFL draft. He played 19 seasons in the AFL and NFL with the Chiefs, Green Bay Packers, and Minnesota Vikings and kicked a then-record 373 field goals. Morten Andersen, born in Copenhagen, Denmark, played 25 seasons in the NFL for five different teams. Nicknamed the "Great Dane", he is the NFL's career leader in field goals made and attempted, games played, and points scored. He retired as the career franchise leader in points scored for both the New Orleans Saints and Atlanta Falcons.

English-born placekicker John Smith played for the New England Patriots from 1974 to 1983. Although he led the league in scoring twice and was invited to the Pro Bowl in 1980, he is best known for kicking a game-winning field goal against the Miami Dolphins in 1982 in the famous Snowplow Game. Other notable Englishmen include Atlanta Falcons placekicker Mick Luckhurst, who went on to present Channel 4's NFL coverage on UK television from 1987 to 1991, two-time Pro Bowl defensive end Osi Umenyiora and former Eagles running back Jay Ajayi. The Eagles traded for him mid 2017 season and won the Super Bowl that year. While with the Miami Dolphins in 2016, the London-born Ajayi became the fourth player in NFL history to rush for 200 or more yards three times in a season. He also became the first London-born skill position player to play in his hometown, when the Dolphins faced the Saints in the NFL International Series at Wembley Stadium in 2017.

The New York Giants' current kicker and punter were both born in Scotland. Kicker Graham Gano is a 2017 Pro Bowl invitee who has played for the Giants, Washington Redskins, and Carolina Panthers. Punter Jamie Gillan, nicknamed "the Scottish Hammer," previously played for the Cleveland Browns.

=== Oceania ===
In recent decades, Polynesians—in particular Samoans—have found great success in the NFL, so much so that the island of American Samoa has been referred to as "Football Island" by outsiders. According to Forbes in 2015, a Samoan male was 56 times more likely to play in the NFL than a non-Samoan male.

Al Lolotai was the first Polynesian to play professionally, playing for the Washington Redskins in 1945, and the AAFC Los Angeles Dons from 1946 to 1949. Samoans began to make their mark in the NFL in the 1970s with players such as Jack "The Throwin' Samoan" Thompson and Pago Pago native Mosi Tatupu. Thompson was the first Polynesian quarterback in the NFL, and Tatupu was invited to the Pro Bowl in 1986 as a special teams player.

Vai Sikahema was the first Tonga native in the NFL. He led the league in punt return yards in 1986 and 1987 while playing for the St. Louis Cardinals. Sikahema's cousin, Deuce Lutui, also from Tonga, later played seven seasons in the NFL as an offensive guard. Super Bowl XLIII featured two Tongan offensive guards in Lutui for the Cardinals and Chris Kemoeatu for the Steelers.

The Polynesian Football Hall of Fame was established in 2013 to honor the greatest players, coaches, and contributors of Polynesian descent in football history. Native Polynesian NFL players that have been inducted include Thompson, Tatupu, Sikahema, New Zealander Riki Ellison, and Samoans Jesse Sapolu and Maa Tanuvasa. Tongan Ma'ake Kemoeatu, cousin of Chris, was announced as an inductee for the 2018 class.

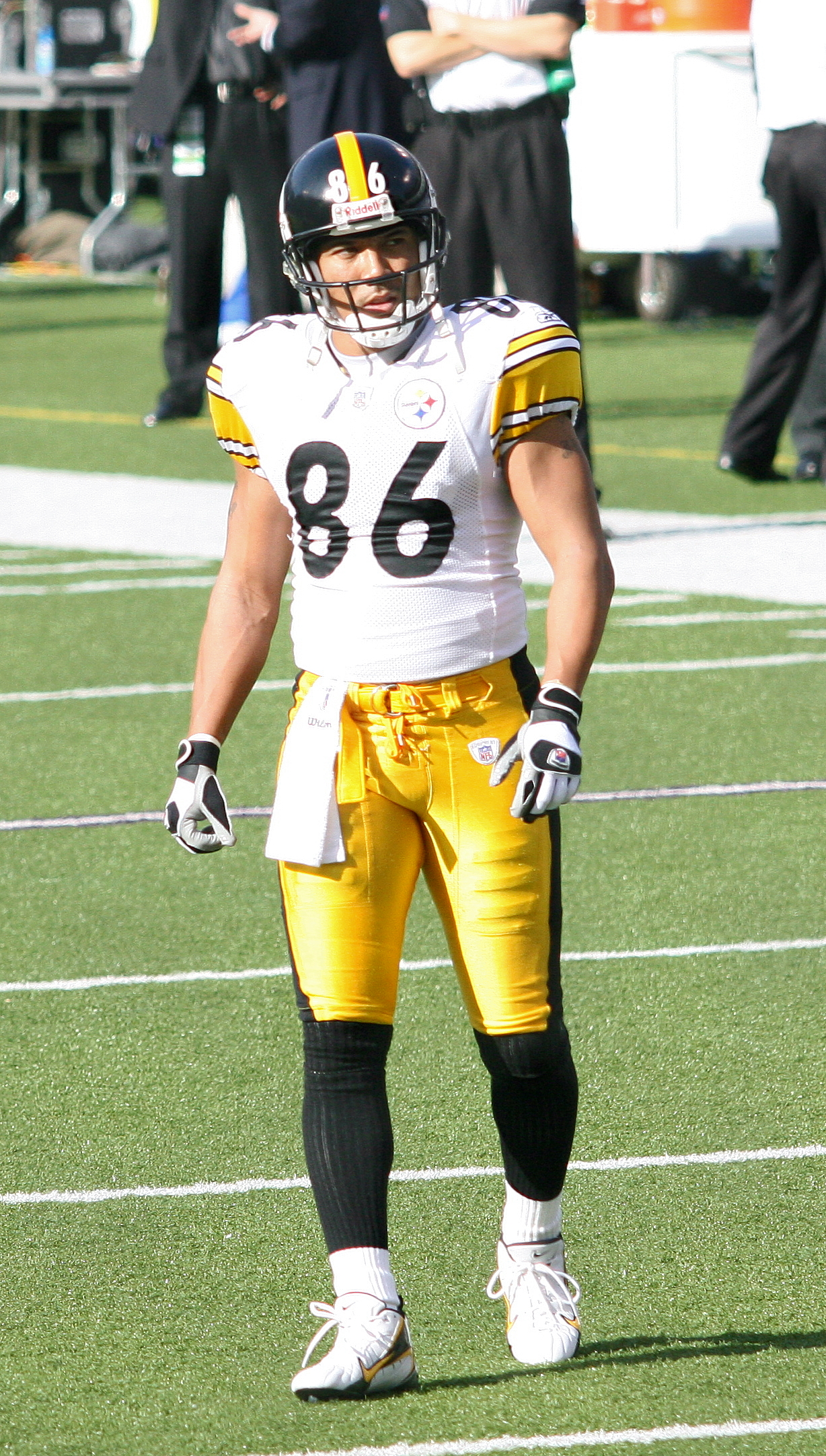
Seoul native Hines Ward

=== Asia ===
Placekicker John Lee was the first Asian drafted in the NFL. He was born in Seoul, South Korea. The four-year, $900,000 contract he signed with the Cardinals in 1986 was the richest in NFL history for a kicker. Although highly successful in college for the UCLA Bruins, he lasted only one season in the NFL. Younghoe Koo, who was also born in Seoul, has found more success. A 2020 Pro Bowler, Koo has kicked for the Los Angeles Chargers and Atlanta Falcons, and became known for his ability to successfully execute onside kicks.

One of the most popular Asian-born players in NFL history is Hines Ward. Born in Seoul to a Korean mother and African-American serviceman, Ward played 14 seasons for the Pittsburgh Steelers from 1998 to 2011 and previously coached in the NFL. During his career he won two Super Bowls, was invited to four Pro Bowls, and set numerous Steelers franchise receiving records.

=== Africa ===
In 1984, Obed Ariri of Owerri, Nigeria, set Tampa Bay Buccaneers franchise single-season records for field goals (19 of 26) and points (95). Ariri also encouraged fellow Nigeria native Donald Igwebuike to tryout as kicker for the Clemson Tigers football team. The Buccaneers cut Ariri after the 1984 season and signed Igwebuike, who went on to become Tampa Bay's career leader in field goals and scoring. A later representative of Nigeria was fullback Christian Okoye of Enugu, who became famous as the "Nigerian Nightmare" due to his powerful running style and ability to break tackles.

Players representing Africa as of the 2017 season include Kenya native Daniel Adongo for the Indianapolis Colts as an outside linebacker, Liberia native Tamba Hali, a five-time Pro Bowl outside linebacker for the Kansas City Chiefs, and Ghana native Ezekiel "Ziggy" Ansah, a defensive end for the Detroit Lions. Despite his young career, Ansah has been called one of the most influential and greatest Africans to play in the NFL. Ansah was invited to the Pro Bowl in 2015 after recording 14.5 sacks and forcing four fumbles.

=== Australia ===
Recent seasons have seen a surge of Australians in the NFL primarily at the punter position. As punting is a vital aspect of Australian rules football, many players develop a skill set suited for American football. The first Australian in the NFL was Melbourne native Colin Ridgeway, a punter who played a single season with the Dallas Cowboys in 1965. The first punter to spend significant time in the league was Darren Bennett, who was a punter for the San Diego Chargers and Minnesota Vikings from 1995 to 2005. He is credited with having paved the way for the upsurge of recent Australian punters in the NFL, which includes Ben Graham, Matt McBriar, Brad Wing, Saverio Rocca, Jordan Berry, and Lac Edwards.

Defensive tackle Colin Scotts was the first Australian to be drafted into the NFL, selected by the Cardinals in the third round of the 1987 draft. In 2015, rugby league footballer Jarryd Hayne of Sydney signed with the San Francisco 49ers as an undrafted free agent. He played a limited role in eight games for the 49ers as a running back and punt returner before returning to Australia to resume his rugby league career. Despite Hayne's brief NFL career, Scotts credited him with spurring the popularity of American football in Australia.

=== Canada ===
Canadians make the most significant single source of foreign-born NFL players, due to the close geographical, linguistic, economic, and cultural ties between Canada and the United States. Most importantly, Canadians play their own domestic gridiron football code known as Canadian football and have their own professional equivalent to the NFL, the Canadian Football League (CFL). Because the two sports are very similar, American and Canadian players regularly transition between the two leagues. Canadians have played in the NFL since its inaugural season in 1920 with players such as Perce Wilson and Tommy Hughitt.

== List of international players in the Pro Football Hall of Fame ==
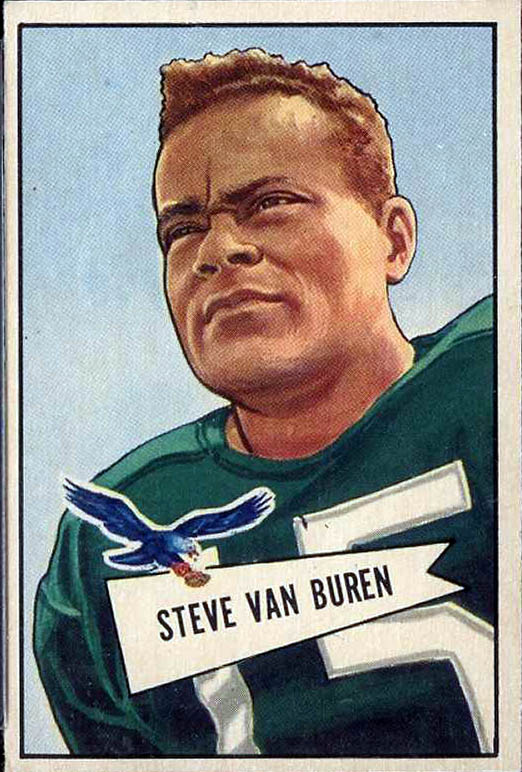
Hall of Fame halfback Steve Van Buren was born in La Ceiba, Honduras.

Nine former players born outside the United States have been inducted into the Pro Football Hall of Fame.

Player	Birthplace	Position	Team(s)	Inducted	Source
Morten Andersen	Denmark	Placekicker	New Orleans Saints (1982–1994); Atlanta Falcons (1995–2000); New York Giants (2001); Kansas City Chiefs (2002–2003); Minnesota Vikings (2004); Atlanta Falcons (2006–2007)	2017	
Tom Fears	Mexico	End	Los Angeles Rams (1948–1956)	1970	
Ted Hendricks	Guatemala	Linebacker	Baltimore Colts (1969–1973); Green Bay Packers (1974); Oakland/Los Angeles Raiders (1975–1983)	1990	
Bronko Nagurski	Canada	Fullback	Chicago Bears (1930–1937, 1943)	1963	
Leo Nomellini	Italy	Defensive tackle	San Francisco 49ers (1950–1963)	1969	
Ernie Stautner	Germany	Defensive tackle	Pittsburgh Steelers (1950–1963)	1969	
Jan Stenerud	Norway	Placekicker	Kansas City Chiefs (1967–1979); Green Bay Packers (1980–1983); Minnesota Vikings (1984–1985)	1991	
Steve Van Buren	Honduras	Halfback	Philadelphia Eagles (1944–1951)	1965	
Arnie Weinmeister	Canada	Defensive tackle	New York Giants (1950–1953)	1984	

== List of current NFL players born outside of the United States ==
Nationality	Birthplace	Player	Pos.	Ref.
American Samoa	American Samoa	Jonah Savaiinaea	Guard	
American Samoa	American Samoa	Frankie Luvu	Linebacker	
American Samoa	American Samoa	Noah Sewell	Linebacker	
American Samoa	American Samoa	Penei Sewell	Offensive tackle	
American Samoa	American Samoa	Nephi Sewell	Linebacker	
American Samoa	American Samoa	Francisco Mauigoa	Linebacker	
American Samoa	American Samoa	Francis Mauigoa	Guard	
American Samoa/United States	American Samoa	Vega Ioane	Guard	
Australia	Australia	Mitch Wishnowsky	Punter	
Australia	Australia	Daniel Faalele	Guard	
Australia	Australia	Jeremy Crawshaw	Punter	
Australia	Australia	Tory Taylor	Punter	
Australia	Australia	Michael Dickson	Punter	
Australia	Australia	Brett Thorson	Punter	
Australia / New Zealand	Australia	Jordan Mailata	Offensive tackle	
Australia	Australia	Cameron Johnston	Punter	
Australia	Australia	Jack Bouwmeester	Punter	
Australia	Australia	Jeremy Crawshaw	Punter	
Austria	Austria	Bernhard Raimann	Offensive tackle	
Austria	Austria	Valentin Senn	Offensive tackle	
Bahamas	Bahamas	Denzel Daxon	Defensive end	
Netherlands / United States	Belgium	Corliss Waitman	Punter	
Belize	Belize	Rakeem Nuñez-Roches	Defensive end	
Brazil	Brazil	Cairo Santos	Kicker	
Cameroon	Cameroon	Arnold Ebiketie	Linebacker	
Canada	Cameroon	Rene Konga	Defensive tackle	
Canada	Canada	Logan Taylor	Guard	
Canada	Canada	Akheem Mesidor	Outside linebacker	
Canada	Canada	Josh Palmer	Wide receiver	
Canada	Canada	Michael Hoecht	Defensive end	
Canada	Canada	Tavius Robinson	Linebacker	
Canada	Canada	Chase Brown	Running back	
Canada	Canada	Jared Wayne	Wide receiver	
Canada	Canada	Neville Gallimore	Nose tackle	
Canada	Canada	Elic Ayomanor	Wide receiver	
Canada	Canada	Benjamin St-Juste	Cornerback	
Canada	Canada	Deane Leonard	Cornerback	
Canada	Canada	Theo Johnson	Tight end	
Canada / United States	Canada	Jevon Holland	Safety	
Canada	Canada	Sydney Brown	Safety	
Canada	Canada	Theo Benedet	Offensive tackle	
Canada	Canada	Nikola Kalinic	Tight end	
Canada	Canada	Albert Reese	Offensive tackle	
Canada	Canada	Matthew Bergeron	Guard	
Canada	Canada	Wesley Bailey	Linebacker	
Canada	Canada	Chuba Hubbard	Running back	
Canada	Canada	Nathan Shepherd	Defensive tackle	
Canada	Canada	Isaiah Adams	Guard	
Canada / United States	Canada	Alaric Jackson	Offensive tackle	
Canada	Canada	Kurtis Rourke	Quarterback	
Ivory Coast	Ivory Coast	Kader Kohou	Cornerback	
Denmark	Denmark	Hjalte Froholdt	Center	
United Kingdom; England	France	Seydou Traore	Tight end	
Gabon	Gabon	Jeffrey M'Ba	Defensive tackle	
Gambia	Gambia	Ali Gaye	Linebacker	
Germany	Germany	Marlin Klein	Tight end	
Germany	Germany	Julius Welschof	Linebacker	
Germany	Germany	Kilian Zierer	Offensive tackle	
United States	Germany	Josh Harris	Long snapper	
Germany	Germany	Lenny Krieg	Kicker	
United States	Germany	Mike Jackson	Cornerback	
Germany	Germany	Lorenz Metz	Offensive tackle	
Ghana	Ghana	Thomas Incoom	Linebacker	
United States	Greece	Kyle Hamilton	Safety	
Greece	Greece	George Karlaftis	Defensive end	
Liberia / United States	Guinea	Kwity Paye	Defensive end	
Haiti / United States	Haiti	Junior Colson	Linebacker	
Haiti / United States	Haiti	Anthony Lucas	Defensive end	
Haiti / United States	Haiti	Mike Sainristil	Cornerback	
United States	Hong Kong	Cameron Dicker	Kicker	
Ireland	Ireland	Daniel Whelan	Punter	
Italy	Italy	Max Pircher	Offensive tackle	
Jamaica / United States	Jamaica	Danielle Hunter	Defensive end	
Jamaica / United States	Jamaica	Matt Peart	Guard	
Jamaica / United States	Jamaica	Laken Tomlinson	Guard	
Jamaica / United States	Jamaica	DJ Rogers	Tight end	
United States	Japan	Andrei Iosivas	Wide receiver	
Japan	Japan	Kansei Matsuzawa	Kicker	
United States	Japan	Patrick Jones II	Linebacker	
United States	Japan	Michael Carter	Running back	
Kenya	Kenya	Josh Weru	Defensive lineman	
Lesotho / Nigeria / South Africa	Lesotho	Paschal Ekeji	Defensive end	
Liberia	Liberia	Sam Okuayinonu	Defensive end	
Mexico	Mexico	Isaac Alarcón	Offensive tackle	
Netherlands	Netherlands	Thomas Odukoya	Tight end	
Australia / New Zealand	New Zealand	Laekin Vakalahi	Offensive tackle	
United States / New Zealand	New Zealand	George Holani	Running back	
Nigeria	Nigeria	Uar Bernard	Defensive tackle	
Nigeria	Nigeria	Max Iheanachor	Offensive tackle	
Nigeria	Nigeria	Roy Mbaeteka	Offensive tackle	
Nigeria	Nigeria	Obinna Eze	Offensive tackle	
Nigeria	Nigeria	Chukwuma Okorafor	Offensive tackle	
Nigeria	Nigeria	C. J. Okoye	Defensive end	
Nigeria	Nigeria	Joseph Ossai	Defensive end	
Nigeria / United States	Nigeria	Samson Ebukam	Defensive end	
Nigeria	Nigeria	Emmanuel Ogbah	Defensive end	
Nigeria	Nigeria	David Agoha	Defensive end	
Nigeria	Nigeria	Chukwuebuka Godrick	Offensive tackle	
Nigeria	Nigeria	Moro Ojomo	Defensive tackle	
Nigeria	Nigeria	David Onyemata	Nose tackle	
Nigeria / United States	Nigeria	Ruke Orhorhoro	Defensive tackle	
Nigeria / United States	Nigeria	Princely Umanmielen	Linebacker	
Nigeria	Nigeria	Ben Chukwuma	Offensive tackle	
Nigeria / Canada	Nigeria	Amen Ogbongbemiga	Linebacker	
Nigeria / United Kingdom	Nigeria	Adedayo Odeleye	Defensive end	
Nigeria	Nigeria	Kingsley Jonathan	Defensive end	
Panama / United States	Panama	Jaylinn Hawkins	Safety	
Panama / United States	Panama	Darrell Baker Jr.	Cornerback	
Puerto Rico	Puerto Rico	Federico Maranges	Center	
Samoa / Australia	Samoa	Laki Tasi	Guard	
Samoa / United States	Samoa	Eku Leota	Guard	
South Africa	South Africa	Jordan van den Berg	Defensive tackle	
Canada / Taiwan	Taiwan	John Metchie III	Wide receiver	
Tonga / Canada	Tonga	Giovanni Manu	Offensive tackle	
Trinidad and Tobago / United States	Trinidad and Tobago	Javon Kinlaw	Defensive tackle	
United Kingdom; England	United Kingdom; England	Travis Clayton	Offensive tackle	
United Kingdom; England	United Kingdom; England	David Olajiga	Defensive end	
United Kingdom; England	United Kingdom; England	Jermaine Eluemunor	Offensive tackle	
United Kingdom; England / Zambia	United Kingdom; England	Mapalo Mwansa	Linebacker	
United Kingdom; Northern Ireland	United Kingdom; Northern Ireland	Charlie Smyth	Kicker	
United States / Canada	United States	Dalton Kincaid	Tight end	
United States / Canada	United States	Taylor Rapp	Safety	
United States / Canada	United States	Alex Singleton	Linebacker	
United States / Egypt	United States	Ahmed Hassanein	Defensive end	
United States / Germany	United States	Nick Folk	Kicker	
United States / Germany	United States	Brandon Coleman	Guard	
United States / Ghana	United States	Jeremiah Owusu-Koramoah	Linebacker	
Venezuela / United States	Venezuela	Andrés Borregales	Kicker	
Zimbabwe / United States	Zimbabwe	Andrew Mukuba	Safety	
Zimbabwe / United States	Zimbabwe	Nate Landman	Linebacker	

== See also ==
- List of NBA players born outside the United States
- List of WNBA players born outside the United States
