= Ted Hopkins (American football) =

American football player (1902–1955)

Profile
- Positions: End, Guard, Tackle

Personal information
- Born: May 11, 1902; Columbus, Ohio, U.S.
- Died: March 14, 1955 (aged 52); Columbus, Ohio, U.S.
- Listed height: 5 ft 9 in (1.75 m)
- Listed weight: 180 lb (82 kg)

Career information
- College: None

Career history
- 1921–1922: Columbus Panhandles
- Stats at Pro Football Reference

George T. (Ted) Hopkins (May 11, 1902 – March 14, 1955) was an American professional football player in the early National Football League (NFL) for the Columbus Panhandles. He was a teammate, of the Panhandles' infamous Nesser Brothers. However, he was also a nephew to the brothers, since his mother Anna was their sister. His cousin, Charlie Nesser, and uncle, John Schneider played on the team as well.

Ted only played briefly with the team from 1921 until 1922.
