= Harry Flaherty =

Harry Flaherty may refer to:

- Harry Flaherty (tight end) (born 1989), American football tight end
- Harry Flaherty (linebacker) (born 1961), American football linebacker
