= 1912 Columbus Panhandles season =

American football team season

- Head coach: Joseph F. Carr

Results
- Record: 1–3

The 1912 Columbus Panhandles season was an American football team played professional football in the Ohio League. The team featured the Nesser brothers.

== Schedule ==
Date	Opponent	Location	Result	Source
October 6	at Dayton Oakwood	Dayton, Ohio	L 2-7	
October 13	at Akron Indians	Nollan's park, Akron, Ohio	L 6–12	
October 20	at Canton Bulldogs	Canton, Ohio	L 6-25	
November 3	Cincinnati Celts	Columbus, Ohio	W 6-0	

== Players ==
Player information is based on box scores in published game accounts.

- Buyer - guard
- Burkhart - guard
- Clyder - tackle
- J. Colburn - halfback
- B. Davis - guard
- G. Davis - guard
- S. Davis - halfback
- Deckhart, center
- Jarvis - fullback, center
- Kertzinger/Kurtzinger - fullback, center
- Kierchner - tackle
- Kilogue - end
- R. Kuchner/Kuehne - center, tackle
- O. Kuelemer - tackle
- Lynch - end
- A. Nesser - end
- F. Nesser - halfback, fullback, end
- Frank Nesser - halfback
- J. Nesser - guard, quarterback
- N. Nesser - guard
- P. Nesser - tackle
- R. Nesser - tackle
- Ted Nesser - quarterback, halfback
- Snyder - guard
- Turvey/Turney - end
- Wesser, guard
