= Jesse Rodriguez (disambiguation) =

Jesse Rodriguez (born 2000), is an American boxer.

Jesse or Jessie Rodriguez may also refer to:

- Jessie Rodriguez (born 1977), American politician

== See also ==
- Jess Rodriguez (1901–1983), American football player
