= 1918 Dayton Triangles season =

American football team season

- Head coach: Greasy Neale
- Home stadium: Triangle Park

Results
- Record: 8–0

The 1918 Dayton Triangles season was the team's sixth season in the Ohio League. The team finished with a known record of 8–0 and won its first Ohio League title. Many of the top teams in the league did not field teams this season due to the outbreak of World War I and the Spanish flu pandemic, both of which led to the opening of the season being postponed until the middle of October.

== Schedule ==
Game	Date	Opponent	Result
1	October 13, 1918	Toledo Maroons	W 34–0
2	October 20, 1918	Wabash Athletic Association	W 9–0
3	October 27, 1918	Detroit Heralds	W 21–3
4	November 3, 1918	Hammond Clabbys	W 13–6
5	November 10, 1918	at Detroit Heralds	W 15–0
6	November 17, 1918	Columbus Panhandles	W 12–0
7	November 24, 1918	Hammond Clabbys	W 23–0
8	November 28, 1918	at Dayton Miamis	W 62–0
