= 1912 Canton Professionals season =

American football team season

- Head coach: Harry Blythe
- Home stadium: League Field

Results
- Record: 7–4

The 1912 Canton Professionals season was their fourth season in the Ohio League. The team finished with a record of 7–4.

== Schedule ==
Game	Date	Opponent	Result	Record
1	September 22	Cleveland Erin Braus	W 13–0	1–0
2	September 29	Salem, Ohio	W 52–0	2–0
3	October 6	Cleveland National Union	W 46–0	3–0
4	October 13	Youngstown Patricians	W 87–0	4–0
5	October 20	Columbus Panhandles	W 25–6	5–0
6	October 27	Cleveland Willoughbys	W 105–0	6–0
7	November 3	Akron Indians	L 6–19	6–1
8	November 10	Shelby Blues	W 25–13	7–1
9	November 17	at Akron Indians	L 7–14	7–2
10	November 24	Elyria Athletics	L 6–7	7–3
11	December 1	Elyria Athletics	L 0–14	7–4
