= 1911 Columbus Panhandles season =

American football team season

- Head coach: Joseph F. Carr
- Home stadium: Indianola Park

Results
- Record: 7–2–1

The 1911 Columbus Panhandles season was an American football team played professional football in the Ohio League. The team compiled a 7–2–1 record and played its home games at Indianola Park in Columbus, Ohio.

== Schedule ==
Date	Opponent	Location	Result	Source
October 1	Columbus Northerns	Indianola Park, Columbus, Ohio	W 3–0	
October 8	Cleveland Genesses	Indianola Park, Columbus, Ohio	W 10–5	
October 15	Akron Indians	Nollan's Park, Akron, Ohio	L 3–6	
October 22	Cleveland Hinkle A.C. All-Stars	Columbus, Ohio	T 5–5	
October 29	Cincinnati Celts	Indianola Park, Columbus, Ohio	W 5–2	
November 5	Toledo Maroons	Indianola Park, Columbus, Ohio	W 9–0	
November 12	Dayton Oakwoods	Dayton, Ohio	W 6–5	
November 19	Shelby Blues	Shelby, Ohio	L 0–41	
November 26	Columbus Muldoons	Indianola Park, Columbus, Ohio	W 6–0	
November 30	at Wellston	Wellston, Ohio	W 17–13	

== Players ==
Player information is based on box scores in published game accounts.

- Boyer - end
- Bushby - end
- Curtman - center
- Davis - halfback
- Drake - quarterback
- Griffin/Griffith - end
- James - quarterback
- Jarvis - quarterback
- Keener - halfback
- Kertzinger - center
- E. Kuehner - tackle
- O. Kuehner - tackle
- McLease - tackle
- A. Nesser - guard
- F. Nesser - halfback
- F. Nesser - fullback
- J. Nesser - halfback
- P. Nesser - tackle
- R. Nesser - fullback
- T. Nesser - guard
- Shea - halfback
- Snyder - guard
- Turvey - end
- Wyant - guard
