= Kelly Rodriguez =

American football player (1907–1997)

No. 18
- Position: Back

Personal information
- Born: August 9, 1907; Avilés, Spain
- Died: October 22, 1997 (aged 90)
- Listed height: 5 ft 10 in (1.78 m)
- Listed weight: 180 lb (82 kg)

Career information
- High school: Victory (Clarksburg, West Virginia, U.S.)
- College: West Virginia Wesleyan

Career history
- Frankford Yellow Jackets (1930); Minneapolis Red Jackets (1930)
- Stats at Pro Football Reference

Aquilino Fabriciano Rodríguez Ávila (August 9, 1907 – October 22, 1997), better known as Kelly Rodriguez, was a Spanish-American professional American football player in the National Football League (NFL).

He played as a back for the Frankford Yellow Jackets and Minneapolis Red Jackets in the 1930 season. He and his brother Jess Rodriguez were the first people from Spain to play in the NFL, and the second and third people of Hispanic descent to do so after Ignacio Molinet.
