= Ray Nesser =

American football player (1898–1969)

Profile
- Positions: Guard, tackle, wingback

Personal information
- Born: March 22, 1898; Columbus, Ohio, U.S.
- Died: September 2, 1969 (aged 71); Columbus, Ohio, U.S.
- Listed height: 6 ft 5 in (1.96 m)
- Listed weight: 220 lb (100 kg)

Career information
- College: None

Career history
- c. 1915: Columbus Panhandles

Raymond Nesser (March 22, 1898 – September 2, 1969) was an American professional football player in the "Ohio League" prior to the formation of the National Football League (NFL) for the Columbus Panhandles. He was also a member of the Nesser Brothers, a group consisting of seven brothers who made-up the most famous football family in the United States from 1907 until the mid-1920s.

It is unknown of the extent of which Ray played with the Panhandles. While he did appear in photos advertising the Panhandles, he did not play in many games with the club. However why he played in so few games remains a mystery. According to family accounts, Ray sprained his ankle in a game one day, and they put liniment on it and put his sock and shoe back on. He went out and played with it, and when they took the sock and shoe off, the skin just came right off of his foot.

While the rest of the Nessers became boilermakers for the Pennsylvania Railroad, Ray decided not to follow his brothers footsteps. Instead he became a policeman for the city of Columbus, Ohio. According to The Columbus Citizen-Journal newspaper on June 6, 1927, Ray, a corporal with the Columbus Police Department, chased and shot an Angelo Furne who fled from the scene of an accident. During the chase, Furne held a hand out in front of body. Nesser fearing that he may have had gun, fired along with his partner an "Officer Knight" and shot Furne killing him. Both officers' actions were cleared by a review panel.

Raymond died on September 2, 1969, at the age of 71.
