= 1918 Columbus Panhandles season =

American football team season

- Head coach: Joseph F. Carr
- Home stadium: Traveling team

Results
- Record: 0–1

The 1918 Columbus Panhandles season was their 13th season in existence. The team played in the Ohio League. According to the only records available, the team played in just one game, which they lost.

== Schedule ==
Game	Date	Opponent	Result
1	November 11, 1918	at Dayton Triangles	L 12–0
