= 1918 Detroit Heralds season =

Sports season

- Head coach: Bill Marshall
- Home stadium: Navin Field

Results
- Record: 6–2

The 1918 Detroit Heralds season was the 14th season for the Detroit Heralds, an independent American football team. Led by coach Bill Marshall, the team compiled a 6–2 record. Fullback Pat Dunne was the team captain.

== Schedule ==
Date	Opponent	Site	Result	Attendance	Source
September 29	at U.S. Army, Pontiac	Pontiac, MI	W 13–0		
October 6	Toledo Maroons	Navin Field; Detroit	W 26–0		
October 13	Rochester Jeffersons	Navin Field; Detroit	W 37–0		
October 27	at Dayton Triangles	Dayton, OH	L 3–21		
November 10	Dayton Triangles	Navin Field; Detroit	L 0–15		
November 24	Selfridge Field	Navin Field; Detroit	W 13–0		
December 1	River Rouge Navy	Navin Field; Detroit	W 14–7		
December 8	Armadas	Mack Park; Detroit	W 14–0	2,500	

== Players ==
- Brazell, halfback/end (possibly N.J. Brazell who played halfback for Michigan in 1916)
- Collard, end
- Walter "Red" Cullen, quarterback
- Davis, tackle
- Tom Dickinson, end
- Pat Dunne, fullback
- Hanish, halfback/end (possibly Joseph Hanish who played halfback for Michigan 1916-1917)
- "Red" Harwood, guard/tackle
- Holden, tackle
- Johnson, halfback
- Kelly/Kelley, halfback (possibly Jimmy Kelly who played halfback for the Detroit Titans in 1917)
- Ty Krentler, end/halfback/quarterback
- Martin, tackle
- Mitchell, end
- Dan Mullane, end
- Gil Runkel, center
- Schlee, tackle
- Shanahan, end
- Guy Shields, guard
- Lou Usher, tackle
- Tillie Voss, tackle
- "Dutch" Wein, quarterback
- Young, tackle
