= Red Bank Catholic High School =

High school in Monmouth County, New Jersey, US

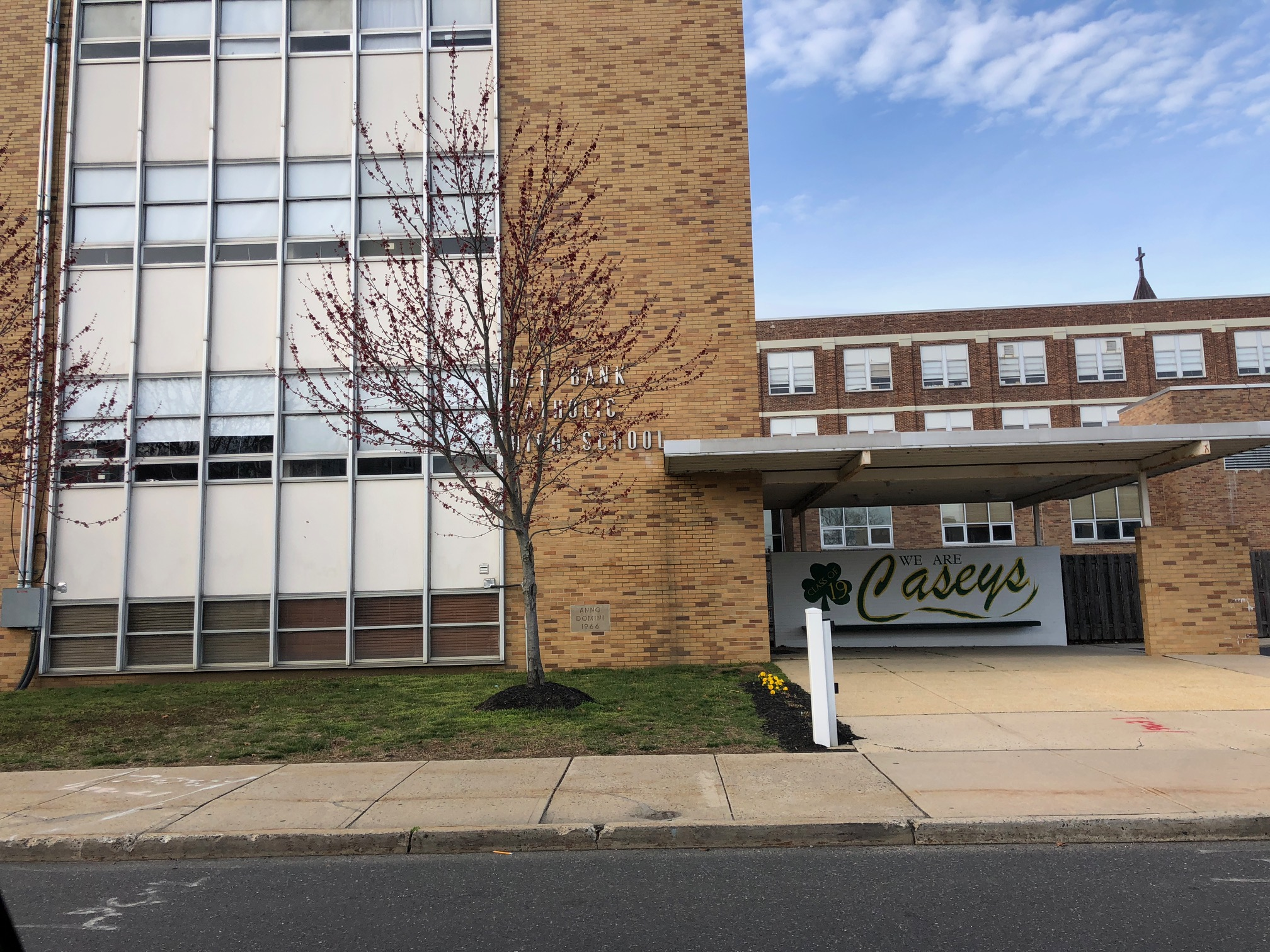
- Red Bank Catholic High School in March 2020

Location
- 112 Broad Street; Red Bank, (Monmouth County), New Jersey 07701; United States; 40°20′54″N 74°3′57″W

Information
- Type: Private, coeducational
- Motto: Pro Deo et Patria (for God and country)
- Religious affiliation: Roman Catholic
- Established: 1927
- School district: Diocese of Trenton
- Superintendent: Vincent de Paul Schmidt
- NCES School ID: 00867243
- President: Robert Abatemarco
- Principal: Vanessa R. Pereira
- Faculty: 74.6 FTEs
- Grades: 9–12
- Enrollment: 915 (as of 2017–18)
- Student to teacher ratio: 12.3:1
- Colors: Green and gold
- Athletics conference: Shore Conference
- Team name: Caseys
- Accreditation: Cognia
- Yearbook: The Emerald
- Tuition: $17,052 (2025–26)
- Website: www.redbankcatholic.org

Red Bank Catholic High School is a four-year private coeducational Roman Catholic high school, located in Red Bank in Monmouth County, in the U.S. state of New Jersey, serving students in ninth through twelfth grades, operating under the supervision of the Roman Catholic Diocese of Trenton. The school has been accredited by Cognia since 2013.

As of the 2017–18 school year, the school had an enrollment of 915 students and 74.6 classroom teachers (on an FTE basis), for a student–teacher ratio of 12.3:1. The school's student body was 88.9% (813) White, 3.6% (33) Hispanic, 3.2% (29) Black and 0.9% (8) Asians. The Class of 2010 included students from 67 different communities and 71 schools. Red Bank Catholic High School has 88 full and part-time teachers, nine administrators, six guidance counselors, a campus minister and a chaplain. 40% of the school's faculty hold advanced degrees. The principal is Vanessa R. Pereira.

Red Bank Catholic High School's colors are Forest Green and Gold.

== History and nickname ==
=== History ===
RBC can trace its history back to 1867 where the pastor of neighboring St. James church founded a school in the basement of the church. The high school as it is known today was established in 1927.

=== Origin of school nickname ===
The school adopted the name Caseys from Monsignor Joseph T. Casey, a retired rear admiral in the United States Navy, who began his career as a curate at St. James Parish in Red Bank. After retiring from the Navy in 1946 he returned to his first and only parish. He was a firm believer in the involvement of youth in the community and wanted to make sure that kids had organized programs to foster learning and fitness. Because of this, he used part of his Naval pension to hire a full coaching staff for teams at the high school, buy uniforms and equipment and organize the school band and orchestra.

== Athletics ==
The Red Bank Catholic High School Caseys compete in Division A Central of the Shore Conference, an athletic conference comprised of public and private high schools in Monmouth and Ocean counties along the Jersey Shore. The league operates under the jurisdiction of the New Jersey State Interscholastic Athletic Association (NJSIAA). With 606 students in grades 10–12, the school was classified by the NJSIAA for the 2019–20 school year as Non-Public A for most athletic competition purposes, which included schools with an enrollment of 381 to 1,454 students in that grade range (equivalent to Group II for public schools). The school was classified by the NJSIAA as Non-Public Group B (equivalent to Group I/II for public schools) for football for 2024–2026, which included schools with 140 to 686 students.

The school participates with Donovan Catholic High School in a joint ice hockey team in which St. Rose High School is the host school / lead agency. The co-op program operates under agreements scheduled to expire at the end of the 2023–24 school year.

Red Bank Catholic offers numerous sports for every season of the year.

Fall sports	Winter sports	Spring sports
Football (men)	Basketball (men's and women's)	Baseball
Soccer (men's and women's)	Swimming (men's and women's)	Softball
Cross country (men's and women's)	Indoor track (men's and women's)	Golf (men's and women's)
Field hockey (women's)	Wrestling (men's)	Lacrosse (men's and women's)
Tennis (women's)	Ice hockey (men's)	Outdoor track (men's and women's)
Gymnastics (women's)	-	Tennis (men's)

The boys cross country running team won the Non-Public Group B state championship in 1968, 1972 and 1996.

The girls' gymnastics team has won the team state championship in 1975–1977, 1980, 1996, 2001, 2002 and 2014–16; the 11 titles are the most of any school in the state.

The girls' outdoor track and field team won the Group IV state championship in 1975, won the Non-Public Group A title in 1987-1990 and 1992, and won the Non-Public B title in 1997. The program's seven state titles are tied for the seventh-most in the state.

The girls cross country running team won the Group III state championship in 1976–1978, 1987 and 1990, and won the Non-Public Group A title in 1993, 1997, 1998, 2000–2003, 2010, 2011, 2013, 2014, 2018 and 2019, and won the Non-Public B title in 1995 and 1996. The program's 20 state titles are the most of any school in the state. The girls cross country team won the Meet of Champions in 1972–1976, 1994-1996 and 2014; the program's nine stat team titles are tied for most in the state.

The football team won the Non-Public A South state sectional championships in 1976 and won the Non-Public Group III title in 2014 and 2018. The 1976 team defeated Notre Dame High School by a score of 41–6 in the Parochial A South sectional championship game. The 2014 team won the NJSIAA Non-Public Group III sectional championship by a score of 45–20 over Delbarton School in a game played at MetLife Stadium in East Rutherford. The team won the Non-Public Group III title in 2018 with a 14–10 win against Mater Dei High School.

The girls tennis team won the Non-Public Group A state championship in 1982 (defeating Immaculate Heart Academy in the finals) 1983 (vs. Immaculate Heart), 1984, (vs. Academy of the Holy Angels), 1985 (vs. Immaculate Heart), 1986 (vs. Holy Angels), 1987 (vs. Holy Angels), 1989-1993 (vs. Holy Angels all five years), 1997 (vs. Holy Angels), 1998 (vs. Immaculate Heart), 1999 (vs. Immaculate Heart), 2009 (vs. Kent Place School), 2010 (vs. Pingry School), 2011 (vs. Pingry) and 2014 (vs. Pingry). The program's 18 state championships are ranked third in New Jersey. The team won the Tournament of Champions in 1984 (vs. runner-up West Orange High School), 1985 (vs. West Orange) and 1987 (vs. Marlboro High School). The 1985 team defeated Immaculate Heart Academy 5–0 in the finals, winning each match in two games. The team went on to win the All-Groups state championship, defeating public school champion West Orange by a score of 3-2 after winning the final match of the tournament in a tiebreaker.

The girls basketball team won the Non-Public B state championship in 1996 (defeating DePaul Catholic High School in the tournament final) and 1997 (vs. St. Anthony High School), and won the Non-Public Group A title in 2000 (vs. Immaculate Heart Academy), 2001 (vs. Paramus Catholic High School), 2004 (vs. Immaculate Heart), 2007 (vs. Morris Catholic High School), 2013 (vs. Immaculate Heart), 2017 (vs. Immaculate Heart) and 2024 (vs. Pope John XXIII Regional High School); the nine state titles are tied for fourth-most of any school in the state. The 1996 team won the Non-Public A title with a 60–33 win against DePaul before advancing to the Tournament of Champions as the top seed, winning the semifinals 52–43 against fifth-seeded Rumson-Fair Haven Regional High School and defeating number-two seed Elizabeth High School 39–31 in the finals to finish the season The 2001 girls' basketball team won the Group A state championship with a 56–39 win over Paramus Catholic High School. The girls basketball won the South A state sectional championship in 2007 with a 60–53 win against Camden Catholic High School in the tournament final. The 2007 team moved on to win the Group A state championship with a 43–40 win against Morris Catholic High School.

The girls swimming team won the Non-Public B state championship in 1996 and 2002.

The softball team won the Non-Public Group B state championship in 1997 (defeating St. Mary High School in the finals) and won the Non-Public A title in 2005 (vs. Mount Saint Dominic Academy) and 2008 (vs. Immaculate Heart Academy).

The boys track team won the Non-Public Group B spring / outdoor track state championship in 1997.

The baseball team won the Non-Public Group B state championship in 1997, defeating Montclair Kimberley Academy in the tournament final.

The girls track team won the Group I state indoor relay championship in 1998 and 1999.

The girls track team won the indoor track Group I state championship in 1999.

The girls soccer team won the Non-Public Group A state championship in 2002 (against runner-up Oak Knoll School of the Holy Child), 2003 (vs. Immaculate Heart Academy), 2005 (co-champion with Pingry School), 2010 (co-champion with Immaculate Heart) and 2016 (co-champion with Oak Knoll). The program's five state titles are tied for tenth-most in the state.

The field hockey team won the Central Jersey Group II state sectional title in 2002.

The 2002 men's ice hockey team won the Handchen Cup Championship / Southern A Conference Championship with a 7–5 over Middletown High School South, and won again in 2008 and 2011; the hockey team was the Dowd Cup Champion in 2005 and the Shore Conference Tournament champion in 2014.

The 2013–14 men's varsity ice hockey team won the inaugural Shore Conference Tournament Championship with a 6–2 win against Howell High School at Middletown Ice World, marking the first time that the Shore Conference played to a single champion.

== Building projects ==
Construction on a new athletic facility takes the place of the recently demolished Sternweiss building that was knocked down in the summer of 2008. The construction of this building is the main focus of their "Imagine RBC 2010" plan, with the other construction being the renovation of a number of classrooms and important areas around the school. This building will be mainly a Student Center with numerous facilities for education, sports, and fitness.

The new 31,000 square feet (2,900 m^{2}) student center now houses a 2,200-square-foot (200 m^{2}) fitness center, two classrooms, locker rooms and proper storage space which will house the Alumni Hall of Fame and trophies and includes infrastructure upgrades such as a new heating system for the entire plant that was completed in September 2007 and is expected to result in significant savings in heating costs. This project was estimated to cost around $12 million which will be funded through the school's Capital Campaign, and was estimated to finish sometime in 2010.

The school is renovating the existing building by completely updating three classrooms, while making numerous additions to others and adding a technology center to their library, complete with 28 new computers and a ceiling-mounted projector with two flat screen LCD monitors. These upgrades along with the creation of a writing lab which is staffed during every lunch period will help increase student productivity and foster new student learning and creativity.

There will also be numerous renovations to the Broad Street Auditorium. This renovation was initiated by the class of the 1950s. The Classes of the 50s launched an initiative to refurbish the auditorium with a celebration called "Moments to Remember." The event preceded a series of fund raising efforts orchestrated by the PTA that funded the renovation. These mostly aesthetic renovations included new stage curtains, new ceiling and ceiling fans, new lighting fixtures and refinishing the original flooring.

== Notable alumni ==
- Michael Arnone (1932–2024), politician who served in the New Jersey General Assembly from 1989 to 2004, where he represented the 12th legislative district
- Antonella Barba (born 1986), contestant on the sixth season of American Idol
- Virginia Bauer (born 1956), advocate for families of the victims of the September 11 terror attacks who is a Commissioner of the Port Authority of New York and New Jersey
- Andrew "A.J." Befumo Jr. (born 1976, class of 1994), former professional wrestler
- Donald Brown (born 1987), former running back for the Indianapolis Colts
- Chris Candido (1972–2005; class of 1990), professional wrestler
- Caroline Casagrande (born 1976), politician who served in the New Jersey General Assembly from 2008 to 2016
- Danielle Colaprico (born 1993), midfielder for the Chicago Red Stars of the National Women's Soccer League
- Alix Earle (born 2000), social media personality
- Harry Flaherty Jr. (born 1989, class of 2007), former NFL tight end who played with the Dallas Cowboys and the New Orleans Saints
- Harry Flaherty Sr. (born 1961, class of 1979), former NFL linebacker who played with the Dallas Cowboys
- Tom Gallagher (1940-2018), diplomat, who in 1976, became the first officer of the United States Foreign Service to come out as gay
- Al Golden (born 1969), defensive coordinator at the University of Notre Dame, who was offensive coordinator at Red Bank Catholic in 1993
- Jyllissa Harris (born 2000), professional soccer defender for the Houston Dash of the National Women's Soccer League
- Emerson Hart (born 1969), songwriter, vocalist, guitarist and producer who is the lead singer and songwriter of the alternative rock band Tonic
- Ryan Kalish (born 1988), former MLB outfielder who played for the Chicago Cubs, Boston Red Sox
- Sean T. Kean (born 1963), member of the New Jersey General Assembly since 2002, where he represents the 30th Legislative District
- Pat Kennedy (born 1952), former men's basketball coach at Towson University, Florida State and DePaul
- Alisa Kresge (born 1985), former basketball player who is the head coach of the Vermont Catamounts women's basketball team
- Mike Largey (born 1960), former professional basketball player who played power forward for Hapoel Tel Aviv B.C. of the Israeli Basketball Premier League from 1984 to 1987
- Joseph A. Laroski (born 1971), lawyer, who is a nominee to serve as a United States judge of the United States Court of International Trade
- Michelle Leonardo (born 1990, class of 2008), Miss New Jersey Teen USA 2008, Miss New Jersey USA 2012, Top 10 at Miss USA 2012
- Quenton Nelson (born 1996), offensive guard for the Indianapolis Colts
- John Nies (born 1967), former Buffalo Bills punter who became a fashion model, actor and host of numerous ESPN programs
- Charles J. O'Byrne (born 1959, class of 1977), Secretary to the Governor of New York David Paterson
- Paul Palmieri (born 1970), entrepreneur and business leader in the mobile telecommunications and digital advertising industries
- Brianne Reed (born 1994), soccer player who plays as a defender for the Dominican Republic women's national football team
- Bob Scrabis (born c. 1967), former college basketball player for the Princeton Tigers men's basketball team
- John H. Tilelli (born 1941, class of 1959), retired United States Army four-star general
