= 1912 Akron Indians season =

American football team season

- Owner: Peggy Parrat
- General manager: Peggy Parratt
- Head coach: Peggy Parratt
- Home stadium: League Park

Results
- Record: 7-3
- Division place: The Ohio League did not have divisions
- Playoffs: The Ohio League did not hold playoff games

The 1912 Akron Indians season was their fifth season in existence. The team played in the Ohio League and posted a 7–3 record.

== Schedule ==
Week	Date	Opponent	Result	Record
1	September 29	Cleveland Genesees	W 19–0	1–0
2	October 6	Youngstown Patricians	W 64–0	2–0
3	October 13	Columbus Panhandles	W 12–6	3–0
4	October 20	Toledo Maroons	W 27–3	4–0
5	October 27	Shelby Blues	L 7–14	4–1
6	November 3	at Canton Athletic Club	W 19–6	5–1
7	November 10	Elyria Athletics	L 0–14	5–2
8	November 17	Canton Athletic Club	W 14–7	6–2
9	November 24	Shelby Blues	W 13–0	7–2
10	November 28	Elyria Athletics	L 0–10	7–3
