= Tom Gallagher (diplomat) =

American diplomat

- Born: September 11, 1940; Manhattan, New York City, U.S.
- Died: July 8, 2018 (aged 77); Wall Township, New Jersey, U.S.
- Education: Monmouth University; University of Southern California
- Occupation: Diplomat
- Spouses: Carolyn Worrell; Amin Dulkumoni

Tom Gallagher (September 11, 1940 – July 8, 2018) was an American diplomat. In 1976, he became the first officer of the United States Foreign Service to come out as gay.

== Early life and education ==
Gallagher was born on September 11, 1940, in Manhattan, New York City. His father was a chauffeur and his mother, an Irish-born maid. He grew up in the servant's quarters of a home in Deal, New Jersey and attended Red Bank Catholic High School.

Gallagher graduated from Monmouth University, where he earned a bachelor's degree in political science in 1962. He later earned a master's degree from the University of Southern California.

== Career ==
Gallagher served in the United States Peace Corps in Addis Ababa, Ethiopia from 1962 to 1965.

Gallagher became a United States Foreign Service officer in 1965. He served in Saudi Arabia and Nigeria, until he was appointed as consul general in Guayaquil, Ecuador. He returned to the United States, where he served in California and Washington, D.C.

Gallagher quit the Foreign Service after he came out as gay in 1976. He was the first Foreign Service officer to come out as gay, and he would have been unable to obtain a security clearance. Instead, he returned to civilian life and worked as a social worker for HIV/AIDS patients in Los Angeles, California from the late 1970s to the mid-1990s.

Gallagher served in the Foreign Service again from 1994 to 2005. He was stationed in Eritrea, Sudan and Europe. At a 2012 event for the Gays and Lesbians in Foreign Affairs Agencies, then-Secretary of State Hillary Clinton honored his legacy as the first openly gay Foreign Service officer.

== Personal life ==
Gallagher was married twice. He first married Carolyn Worrell in 1966, and they divorced in 1972. In 2017, he married Amin Dulkumoni, a Goldman Sachs employee.

A resident of Tinton Falls, Gallagher died on July 8, 2018, in Wall Township, New Jersey.
