= 1910 Columbus Panhandles season =

American football team season

- Head coach: Joseph F. Carr
- Home stadium: Indianola Park

Results
- Record: 3–2–2

The 1910 season was the fifth season of the Columbus Panhandles. The team played in the Ohio League posted a 3–2–2 record.

== Schedule ==
Game	Date	Opponent	Result
1	October 9, 1910	Columbus Northerns	W 10–0
2	October 16, 1910	Cincinnati Celts	T 0–0
3	October 23, 1910	at Akron Tigers	L 40–0
4	October 30, 1910	Cleveland Lyceum	L 12–6
5	November 6, 1910	Columbus Barracks	W 24–0
6	November 13, 1910	Akron Tigers	W 23–10
7	November 24, 1910	at Dayton Oakwoods	T 5–5
