= John Schneider (American football player) =

American football player (1894–1957)

Profile
- Position: Wingback

Personal information
- Born: February 15, 1894; Columbus, Ohio, U.S.
- Died: May 13, 1957 (aged 63); Columbus, Ohio, U.S.
- Listed height: 5 ft 10 in (1.78 m)
- Listed weight: 180 lb (82 kg)

Career information
- College: None

Career history
- c.1909–1921: Columbus Panhandles
- Stats at Pro Football Reference

John George Schneider (February 15, 1894 – May 13, 1957) was an American professional football player in the "Ohio League" and the early National Football League (NFL) for the Columbus Panhandles. He played from around 1909 until 1921 with the Panhandles. In 1920 he played in one of the first NFL games during a Panhandles 14-0 loss to the Dayton Triangles.

He was a teammate of the Panhandles' infamous Nesser Brothers and later married their sister Mary Rose. However, on one occasion John did not play for Columbus. According to his daughter, Cassidy, the Panhandles sometimes would go to different places and the opposing team would not have enough players. To keep the game scheduled, the opposing team would take somebody from the Panhandles. They were never allowed to take one of the Nesser brothers. During one such game, John, was picked to play against his own team and the Nessers. 'I was the poor fool who got picked to play against the Nessers, and they pulverized me.' He used to say, 'I think that was my scariest day, other than the day I asked the brothers if I could marry their sister.'
