= Lou Molinet =

Cuba-born American football player (1904–1976)

No. 17
- Positions: Fullback, Quarterback

Personal information
- Born: November 30, 1904; Chaparra, Cuba
- Died: August 27, 1977 (aged 72); West Palm Beach, Florida, U.S.
- Listed height: 5 ft 11 in (1.80 m)
- Listed weight: 195 lb (88 kg)

Career information
- High school: Peddie School (Hightstown, New Jersey, U.S.)
- College: Cornell

Career history
- Frankford Yellow Jackets (1927)

Career statistics
- Games played: 9
- Games started: 2
- Rushing touchdowns: 1
- Stats at Pro Football Reference

Ignacio Saturnino "Lou" Molinet (November 30, 1904 – August 27, 1976) was a Cuban-born professional American football player who played in the National Football League (NFL) for the Frankford Yellow Jackets during the 1927 season. He is distinguished as being the first Cuban and Latin American to play in the league.

== Early life ==
Lou's parents had come to Cuba from Spain, it is likely they were Catalonian or of Catalan origin as this is where the name Molina originated. He was educated primarily in America, attending the Peddie School in New Jersey before enrolling at Cornell University, where he followed in the footsteps of his older brother, Joaquin, who was later inducted into the Cornell Athletic Hall of Fame.

== Football career ==
Molinet lettered twice each in basketball and football. However, after his sophomore year ended, both of his parents died. He found the prospect of returning to Cornell too challenging, so he remained at home in Cuba. But when the Frankford Athletic Association in Philadelphia contacted him about playing for the Frankford Yellow Jackets, the defending NFL champion, he returned. The team contracted Molinet for a salary of $50 per game. In addition, he received $50 per week just to attend practice.

In 1927, Molinet rushed for 75 yards and passed for another 35 yards. He also caught several passes, and even scored a touchdown during a Yellow Jackets' win over the Buffalo Bison. He played in nine NFL games that season and the Yellow Jackets fell below .500 good for 7th place in the standings. Molinet returned to Cornell, finished his degree and lived a life far away from football. At the time of his death, his own family knew very little of his athletic career outside of college.

== Later life and legacy ==
Molinet spent his later life working at Eastman Kodak. He actually worked for the Carrier Corporation, first in New York City, then in Rochester and then in Syracuse. Many in media referred to him as "Lou" Molinet. However his family states he was never called that. His nicknames were really "Molly," and "Iggy".

Prior to 1999, it was concluded that Jess Rodriguez, a fullback with the 1929 Buffalo Bisons, was the first NFL player of Hispanic heritage. However, in 2000, Heidi Cadwell, Molinet's granddaughter, contacted the Pro Football Hall of Fame about donating her grandfather's NFL contract from 1927. Her call was of great interest to the Hall because at the time it was widely believed that Rodriguez was the first Hispanic player in NFL history. Further research by the Hall of Fame and Hispanic historian Mario Longoria confirmed that, in fact, Molinet played in the NFL in 1927. Today Molinet's contract is prominently displayed at the Pro Football Hall of Fame.
