= Ryan Neal =

American football player (born 1995)

Profile
- Position: Safety

Personal information
- Born: December 24, 1995 (age 30); Hammond, Indiana, U.S.
- Listed height: 6 ft 3 in (1.91 m)
- Listed weight: 200 lb (91 kg)

Career information
- High school: Merrillville (Merrillville, Indiana)
- College: Southern Illinois (2014–2017)
- NFL draft: 2018: undrafted

Career history
- Philadelphia Eagles (2018)*; Atlanta Falcons (2018); Seattle Seahawks (2019–2022); Tampa Bay Buccaneers (2023–2024)
- * Offseason or practice squad member only

Career NFL statistics as of 2024
- Total tackles: 239
- Sacks: 2
- Forced fumbles: 1
- Pass deflections: 16
- Interceptions: 3
- Stats at Pro Football Reference

Ryan Christopher Neal (born December 24, 1995) is an American professional football safety. He played college football for the Southern Illinois Salukis, and has been a member of the Philadelphia Eagles, Atlanta Falcons, Seattle Seahawks, and Tampa Bay Buccaneers while in the NFL.

== College career ==
Neal played four seasons at Southern Illinois, compiling 226 career tackles, 6.5 tackles for loss, five interceptions and 19 passes defensed. As a senior, Neal led the team with three interceptions and tied for the team lead with 84 tackles and was named honorable mention All-Missouri Valley Football Conference.

== Professional career ==
Pre-draft measurables
Height	Weight	Arm length	Hand span	40-yard dash	10-yard split	20-yard split	20-yard shuttle	Three-cone drill	Vertical jump	Broad jump	Bench press
6 ft 1 7/8 in (1.88 m)	187 lb (85 kg)	31 3/4 in (0.81 m)	8 3/4 in (0.22 m)	4.47 s	1.58 s	2.63 s	4.29 s	7.18 s	37.5 in (0.95 m)	10 ft 7 in (3.23 m)	15 reps
All values from Pro Day

=== Philadelphia Eagles ===
Neal signed with the Philadelphia Eagles as an undrafted free agent on April 28, 2018. He was waived by the team during training camp on August 6, 2018.

=== Atlanta Falcons ===
Neal was signed by the Atlanta Falcons on August 11, 2018. However, he failed to make the 53-man roster out of training camp and was subsequently re-signed by the Falcons to the team's practice squad on September 2, 2018. Neal was promoted to the Falcons active roster on November 28, 2018. Neal made his NFL debut on December 9, 2018, in a 34–20 loss to the Green Bay Packers, playing on special teams in the only regular season appearance of his rookie season. Neal was waived by the Falcons as part of the team's final roster cuts on August 31, 2019.

=== Seattle Seahawks ===
Neal was signed to the Seattle Seahawks practice squad on September 2, 2019. The Seahawks promoted Neal to the active roster on December 11, 2019.

Neal re-signed with the Seahawks on April 20, 2020. He was waived on September 5, and signed to the practice squad the next day. He was elevated to the active roster on September 26 for the team's week 3 game against the Dallas Cowboys. With six seconds remaining in the game, he intercepted Dak Prescott in the end zone, sealing a 38–31 victory for the Seahawks. After automatically reverting to the practice squad following the game, Neal was promoted to the active roster on September 30. On October 4, with Adams and Lano Hill still injured, he made his first start for the Seahawks in a game against the Miami Dolphins. Neal made 6 tackles, and also collected his second interception, from Ryan Fitzpatrick.

Neal signed a one-year exclusive-rights free agent tender with the Seahawks on June 8, 2021.

Neal's restricted free agent tender that he was offered in the 2023 off-season was rescinded by the team on March 31, 2023. This move by the Seahawks officially made Neal a free agent.

=== Tampa Bay Buccaneers ===
Neal signed with the Tampa Bay Buccaneers on April 4, 2023. He played in 15 games with 13 starts, recording a career-high 76 tackles.

On December 4, 2024, Neal was re-signed to the Buccaneers' practice squad. He was promoted to the active roster on January 4, 2025.

== Personal life ==
Neal is the younger brother of former Green Bay Packers linebacker Mike Neal.
