= Jess Rodriguez =

Spanish player of American football

No. 20
- Position: Tailback

Personal information
- Born: August 7, 1901; Avilés, Asturias, Spain
- Died: October 12, 1983 (aged 82); Clarksburg, West Virginia, U.S.
- Listed height: 5 ft 7 in (1.70 m)
- Listed weight: 160 lb (73 kg)

Career information
- High school: Victory (Clarksburg, West Virginia, U.S.)
- College: Salem

Career history
- Buffalo Bisons (1929)
- Stats at Pro Football Reference

Ángel Jesús Rodríguez Ávila (August 7, 1901 – October 12, 1983), better known as Jess Rodriguez, was a Spanish-American professional American football player for the Buffalo Bisons of the National Football League (NFL). He and his brother, Kelly Rodriguez, are the first two Spaniards to have played in the NFL. It would only be them two until 2014 when Alejandro Villanueva played for the Pittsburgh Steelers.

He played for the Bisons during its final 1929 season. He was the first Hispanic-American to play in the NFL and the second person of Hispanic descent to play in the league. Prior to 1999, Rodriguez was considered to be the first Latino to play in the league; however it was later discovered that Cuban-American Lou Molinet played for the Frankford Yellow Jackets in 1927 (but because Molinet was a Cuban citizen at the time, he was technically not a Hispanic-American). He is distinguished as being the first Spaniard to play in the NFL.
