= Fred Nesser =

American football player (1887–1967)

Profile
- Positions: End, Fullback, Tackle

Personal information
- Born: September 10, 1887; Columbus, Ohio, U.S.
- Died: July 2, 1967 (aged 69); Columbus, Ohio, U.S.
- Listed height: 6 ft 5 in (1.96 m)
- Listed weight: 250 lb (113 kg)

Career information
- College: None

Career history
- 1909–1921: Columbus Panhandles
- Stats at Pro Football Reference

Frederick William Nesser (September 10, 1887 – July 2, 1967) was an American professional football player in the "Ohio League" and the early National Football League (NFL) for the Columbus Panhandles. He was also a member of the Nesser Brothers, a group consisting of seven brothers who made-up the most famous football family in the United States from 1907 until the mid-1920s. He was the tallest and biggest of the football-playing brothers at six feet five inches and 250 pounds. He played mostly tackle or end, but sometimes he lined up in the backfield, to provide blocking.

Fred also was a professional boxer and a legitimate contender for the heavyweight title, held by Jess Willard. However, in 1915, a broken wrist ended his boxing career.

Around 1987 Fred's daughter, Vera, tried to get the city of Columbus to name a street for the Nesser Brothers. Her request was turned down.
