= Harry Flaherty (linebacker) =

American football player (born 1961)

No. 54, 55
- Position: Linebacker

Personal information
- Born: December 25, 1961 (age 64); Red Bank, New Jersey, U.S.
- Listed height: 6 ft 1 in (1.85 m)
- Listed weight: 232 lb (105 kg)

Career information
- High school: Red Bank Catholic
- College: Holy Cross
- NFL draft: 1984: undrafted

Career history
- Philadelphia Eagles (1984)*; Tampa Bay Bandits (1985); Baltimore Stars (1986)*; Dallas Cowboys (1987)
- * Offseason or practice squad member only

Awards and highlights
- Division I-AA third-team All-American (1983); 2× All-New England (1982, 1983)

Career NFL statistics
- Games played: 2
- Stats at Pro Football Reference

Harry Edward Flaherty (born December 15, 1961) is an American former professional football player who was a linebacker in the National Football League (NFL) for the Dallas Cowboys. He also was a member of the Tampa Bay Bandits of the United States Football League (USFL). He played college football for the Holy Cross Crusaders.

== Early life ==
Flaherty attended Red Bank Catholic High School, where he played football, baseball and track.

He accepted a football scholarship from the College of the Holy Cross. He also played baseball. He was a four-year starter at middle linebacker and finished as the school's all-time leader with 447 tackles. As a senior in 1983, he set a school record with 152 tackles in a season, while also contributing to the team winning the Lambert Cup Championship and advancing to the NCAA Division I-AA playoffs for the first time in school history.

In 1995, he was inducted into the Holy Cross Athletic Hall of Fame. In 1997, he was inducted into the Jersey Shore Sports Hall of Fame. In 2015, he was inducted into the Crusader Football Legends Ring of Honor.

== Professional career ==
=== Philadelphia Eagles ===
Flaherty was signed as an undrafted free agent by the Philadelphia Eagles after the 1984 NFL draft on June 18. He was released before the start of the season on August 14.

=== Tampa Bay Bandits (USFL) ===
In 1985, he signed as a free agent with the Tampa Bay Bandits of the United States Football League. He started in some of the games at inside linebacker. He was not re-signed after the season.

=== Baltimore Stars (USFL) ===
In 1986, he was signed as a free agent by the Baltimore Stars, but the league folded and never had a chance to play with the team.

=== Dallas Cowboys ===
After the NFLPA strike was declared on the third week of the 1987 season, those contests were canceled (reducing the 16 game season to 15) and the NFL decided that the games would be played with replacement players. In September, he was signed to be a part of the Dallas Cowboys replacement team that was given the mock name "Rhinestone Cowboys" by the media. He was the backup at left outside linebacker behind Dale Jones. He was released after the strike ended on October 20.

== Personal life ==
In 1988, he married Janine Garrett, sister of former Dallas Cowboys' head coach Jason Garrett. His son Harry Flaherty Jr. tried out at tight end in the NFL, during the 2011 and 2012 preseasons. Since 1995, he has served as New Jersey's director of the ministry Fellowship of Christian Athletes. He also coached tight ends and linebackers at Red Bank Catholic High School.
