= Harry Flaherty (tight end) =

American football player (born 1989)

No. 48
- Position: Tight end

Personal information
- Born: April 26, 1989 (age 37); Oceanport, New Jersey
- Listed height: 6 ft 3 in (1.91 m)
- Listed weight: 250 lb (113 kg)

Career information
- High school: Red Bank Catholic (NJ)
- College: Princeton
- NFL draft: 2011: undrafted

Career history
- New Orleans Saints (2011)*; Dallas Cowboys (2012)*
- * Offseason or practice squad member only
- Stats at Pro Football Reference

Harry Flaherty (born April 26, 1989) is an American former football tight end. He played college football at Princeton University.

== Early life ==
Flaherty attended Red Bank Catholic High School, where he practiced football and track. He was a two-way player at tight end and linebacker. In his career, he posted 36 receptions for 580 yards, 8 touchdowns and 200 tackles. He was a two-time All-county selection and received All-conference honors as a senior.

He was recruited to play football at Princeton University. As a junior, he was named a starter at tight end, registering 18 receptions for 193 yards. He had 5 receptions for 47 yards against Harvard University.

As a senior, he tallied 25 receptions for 212 yards and was used mostly for blocking purposes. He finished his college career with 43 receptions for 405 yards and one pass completion for a touchdown. He also played as a long snapper.

== Professional career ==
Flaherty was signed as an undrafted free agent by the New Orleans Saints after the 2011 NFL draft on July 27. He was released before the start of the season on August 4.

On August 15, 2012, he was signed as a free agent by the Dallas Cowboys, to provide depth at tight end. During his time with the team, he was coached by his uncles Jason Garrett and John Garrett. He was released before the start of the season on August 27.

== Personal life ==
His father Harry Flaherty Sr., played linebacker in the NFL for the Dallas Cowboys. His uncles are Jason Garrett, John Garrett and Judd Garrett. His grandfather was NFL coach and scout Jim Garrett.

From 2013 to 2014, he helped to coach tight ends at the University of Tennessee as a graduate football assistant. In March 2015, Flaherty was named as head coach of the football team at the Lawrenceville School in Lawrenceville, New Jersey. He was also the Junior varsity baseball coach, a history teacher, dorm leader, and an associate dean of admission at the school. In 2021, he was named the football head coach at St. Mark's School of Texas in Dallas.
