= Ted Nesser =

American football player and coach (1883–1941)

Profile
- Positions: Center, Guard, Tackle

Personal information
- Born: April 5, 1883; Dennison, Ohio, U.S.
- Died: June 7, 1941 (aged 58); Columbus, Ohio, U.S.
- Listed height: 5 ft 10 in (1.78 m)
- Listed weight: 230 lb (104 kg)

Career information
- College: None

Career history

Playing
- 1904: Columbus Panhandles
- 1904: Shelby Blues
- 1904–1906: Massillon Tigers
- 1913: Akron Indians
- 1914: Canton Professionals
- 1907–1921: Columbus Panhandles

Coaching
- 1920–1921: Columbus Panhandles
- Coaching profile at Pro Football Reference

Theodore Nesser Jr. (April 5, 1883 – June 7, 1941) was a professional football player-coach in the "Ohio League" and the early National Football League (NFL). During his professional football career, he played for the Columbus Panhandles, Massillon Tigers, Akron Indians, Canton Bulldogs and Shelby Blues.

Ted Nesser, at left, and his brothers comprised the core of the 1921 Columbus Panhandles team.

He was also a member of the Nesser Brothers, a group consisting of seven brothers who made-up the most famous football family in the United States from 1907 until the mid-1920s. Ted was the first Nesser to make money at football, playing for Massillon's state championship teams in 1904, 1905 and 1906.

Ted was considered the toughest of the Nesser brothers. In 1906, he reputedly ended the career of Willie Heston, a former Michigan All-American, with a hard tackle in a Massillon Tigers-Canton Bulldogs game. In 1908, Ted reputedly stayed for a game with two broken bones protruding from an arm, just because he thought that his brothers needed him. Nesser was also reported to have had broken his nose at least eight times.

He was also considered a football genius and is credited with originating several plays including the triple pass, the criss-cross and the short kickoff. These plays became popular in the college game of that day.

None of the Nesser brothers attended college. However, in 1909, Texas A&M coach Charley Moran, fearing a loss to Texas, offered to pay Ted for his help. Even though Ted had never finished high school, he wore a freshman beanie on campus and suited up for the game. The Aggies never trailed, so Ted never got in, but Moran paid him $200 afterward for his trouble.

Ted's son Charlie also played briefly for the Panhandles in 1921. This is marked as the only father-son combination to play together in NFL history.

In 2015, the Professional Football Researchers Association named Nesser to the PRFA Hall of Very Good Class of 2015.
