= Phil Nesser =

American football player (1880–1959)

Profile
- Positions: Guard, Tackle, Wingback

Personal information
- Born: December 10, 1880; Trier, Rhine Province, German Empire
- Died: May 9, 1959 (aged 78); Columbus, Ohio, U.S.
- Listed height: 6 ft 0 in (1.83 m)
- Listed weight: 225 lb (102 kg)

Career information
- College: None

Career history
- 1909–1921: Columbus Panhandles
- Stats at Pro Football Reference

Phillip Gregory Nesser (December 10, 1880 – May 9, 1959) was a German-American professional American football player in the Ohio League and the early National Football League (NFL) for the Columbus Panhandles. He was also a member of the Nesser Brothers, a group consisting of seven brothers who made up the most famous football family in the United States from 1907 until the mid-1920s. He is distinguished as being the first German to play in the NFL.

Phil was primarily a tackle, although he often carried the ball on several plays.

Outside of football, Phil was considered a math genius although he never attended school past the fourth grade. According to his daughter, Phil later taught at Central High School in Columbus until the school's administrators found out he did not have a degree and forced him to resign. In addition to football, he was a champion hammer thrower.
