= Frank Nesser =

American football player (1889–1953)

No. 19, 61
- Positions: Fullback, guard, tackle

Personal information
- Born: June 3, 1889; Columbus, Ohio, U.S.
- Died: January 1, 1953 (aged 63); Columbus, Ohio, U.S.
- Listed height: 6 ft 4 in (1.93 m)
- Listed weight: 245 lb (111 kg)

Career information
- College: None

Career history
- Columbus Panhandles (1907–1924); Akron Indians (1912); Akron Indians (1914); Columbus Tigers (1925–1926)

Awards and highlights
- Ohio League champion (1914)

Career statistics
- Games played: 40
- Games started: 26

Frank Raymond Nesser (June 3, 1889 – January 1, 1953) was an American professional football player in the Ohio League and the early National Football League (NFL). During his career he played mainly for the Columbus Panhandles, however he did also play for a little for the Akron Indians, whenever he was recruited by Indians manager, Peggy Parratt. Frank was a member of the Nesser Brothers, a group consisting of seven brothers who made-up the most famous football family in the United States from 1907 until the mid-1920s.

Nesser frequently engaged in kicking contests with the legendary Jim Thorpe; he once was credited with a 63-yard field goal and his punts were recalled as averaging 70 yards in the air. Frank was a slow but effective runner and a superior passer, with one sportswriter in 1922 reckoning the "big Columbus fullback" could "throw a forward pass as well as any man in the country." He led the Panhandles in scoring during most of his professional seasons.

Nesser was also a minor league baseball player in the Ohio State League from 1910 to 1914. He later played in the North Carolina State League in 1915 and 1916. After abandoning baseball for a few years he restarted his career in the Illinois–Indiana–Iowa League in 1920 and played one final season, in 1921, in the Michigan–Ontario League. He left baseball after nine seasons in which he posted a .325 batting average.

Nesser later worked as a boilermaker for the Pennsylvania Railroad. He died on January 1, 1953, at Doctors Hospital in Columbus, Ohio. He had resided in Amanda, Ohio prior to his death.
