= John Nesser =

American football player (1875–1931)

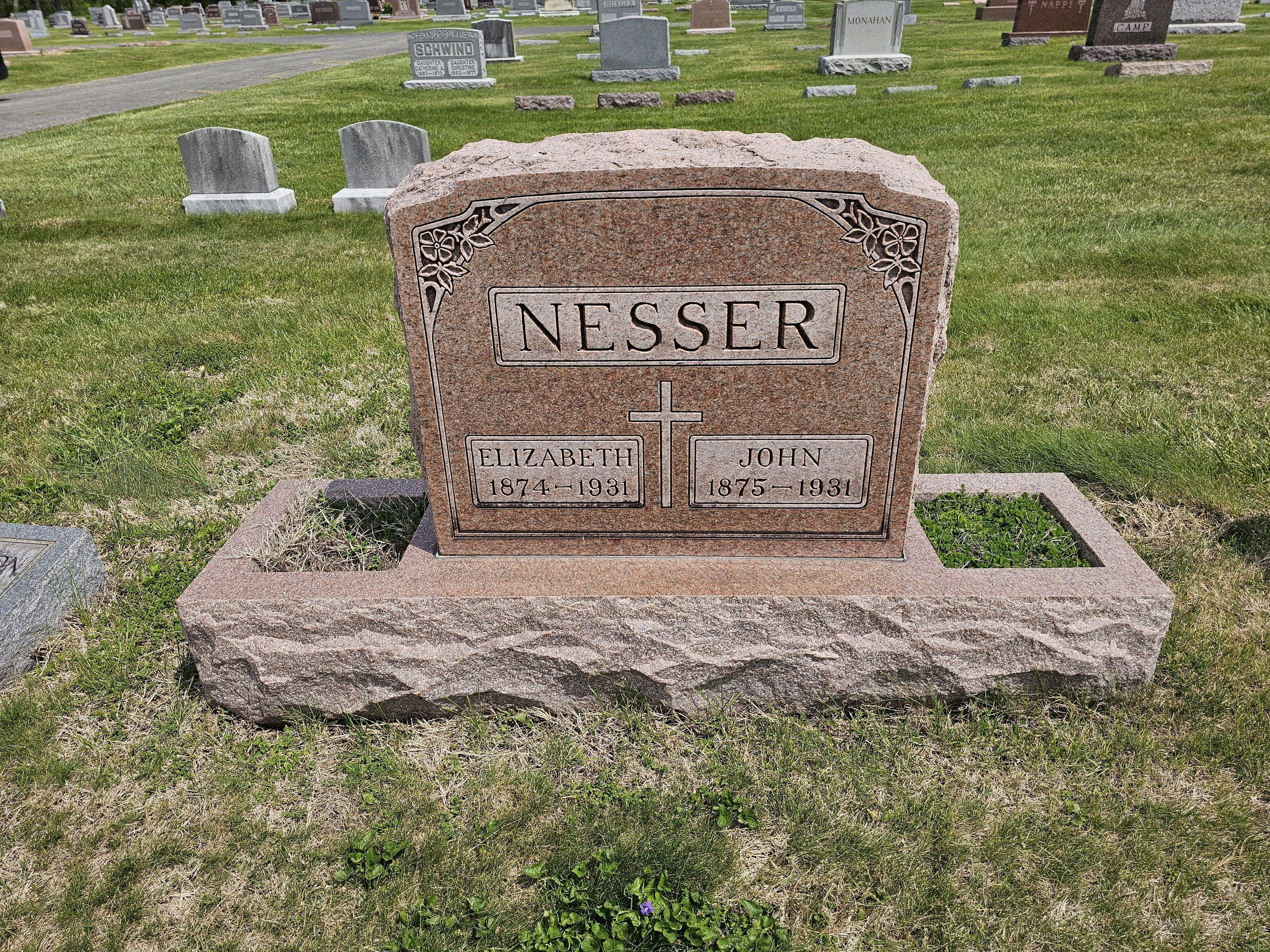

Profile
- Position: Quarterback

Personal information
- Born: April 25, 1875; Trier, German Empire
- Died: July 29, 1931 (aged 56); Columbus, Ohio, U.S.
- Listed height: 5 ft 11 in (1.80 m)
- Listed weight: 195 lb (88 kg)

Career information
- College: None

Career history
- 1909–1921: Columbus Panhandles

John Nesser (April 25, 1875 – July 29, 1931) was a German-American professional American football player in the "Ohio League" and the early National Football League (NFL) for the Columbus Panhandles. He was also the oldest member of the Nesser brothers, a group consisting of seven brothers who made up the most famous football family in the United States from 1907 until the mid-1920s.

Weighing a mere 195 pounds, John was the smallest brother in the family. He usually played quarterback, a position that called primarily for blocking and tackling ability in the 1920s, and on the offensive line. He was an all-around athlete who even won a medal as all-around champion athlete of the Pennsylvania Railroad. His main competition during those events was his own brothers.

After the 1921 season at age 46, Nesser held the record as the NFL's oldest player until it was broken by Bobby Marshall of the Duluth Kelleys in 1925.

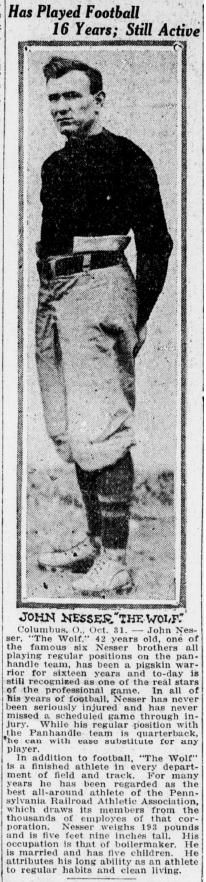
John Nesser
