= Nesser brothers =

Group of American football players

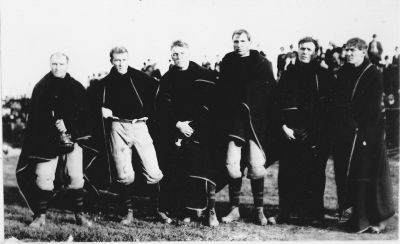
The Nesser brothers in the early 1920s. (L–R) Ted, John, Frank, Fred, Phil, Al

The Nesser brothers were a group of American football-playing brothers who helped make up the most famous football family in the United States from 1902 until 1931. The group consisted of seven brothers who worked for Panhandle Division of the Pennsylvania Railroad in Columbus, Ohio, and who were later used as the foundation for the Columbus Panhandles of the Ohio League, and later the National Football League, when the club was founded by future NFL president Joe Carr in 1907.

== Origins ==
The brothers' father, Theodore, was born on January 20, 1850, in a small town in Germany called Kirsch, near Trier, Rhineland-Palatinate, which was the border region between Germany and France. He eventually got a job with the German railroad as an apprentice boilermaker. Soon afterwards the German government, which operated and controlled all the railroads, sent him to Metz, where he worked for twelve years as a boilermaker.

In 1870, at the age of 20, he fought with the German army in the Franco-Prussian War although he did not care for the fighting. (He lost part of his left hand ring finger when he was shot in the war). After the war, around 1873, Theodore met Katerina Steinbach (born Feb 22, 1854 in Baden, Germany), and the following year the two were married and wasted no time in creating a large family. the couple eventually had 12 children:

1. John Nesser: Born April 25, 1875, in Triere, Germany and died August 1, 1931, in Columbus, Ohio.
2. Anna Kathryn Nesser: b. April 17, 1876 in Triere, Germany and died January 11, 1949, in Columbus, Ohio.
3. John Peter (Pete) Nesser: b. October 22, 1877 in Triere, Germany and died May 29, 1954, in Columbus, Ohio.
4. Ermina Nesser: b. May 5, 1879 in Triere, Germany and died June 24, 1910, in Columbus, Ohio.
5. Philipp Gregory Nesser: b. December 10, 1880 in Triere, Germany and died May 9, 1959, in Columbus, Ohio.
6. Theodore H. (Ted) Nesser: b. April 5, 1883 in Dennison, Ohio, and died June 7, 1941, in Columbus, Ohio.
7. Mary Catherine Nesser: b. May 27, 1885 in Delaware, Ohio, and died May 10, 1900, in Columbus, Ohio.
8. Frederick William Nesser: b. September 10, 1887 in Columbus, Ohio, and died July 2, 1967, in Columbus, Ohio.
9. Francis Raymond (Frank) Nesser: b. June 3, 1889 in Columbus, Ohio, and died January 1, 1953, in Columbus, Ohio.
10. Mary Rose Nesser: b. May 7, 1891 in Columbus, Ohio, and died December 17, 1959, in Columbus, Ohio.
11. Alfred Louis Nesser: b. June 6, 1893 in Columbus, Ohio, and died March 11, 1967, in Columbus, Ohio.
12. Raymond Joseph Nesser: b. March 22, 1898 in Columbus, Ohio, and died September 2, 1969, in Columbus, Ohio.

The railroad sent Theodore to Dennison, Ohio, to start working. By 1882 he had finally saved enough money for Katerina and the five children to make their way to America. He eventually designed the steam engine that would be used by the railroad the years to come. However, when the railroad tweaked his design to get around his patent in 1887, Nesser quit and started a plumbing business in Columbus.

== Pennsylvania Railroad ==
Seven of the eight Nesser boys eventually followed their father to work as boilermakers at the Pennsylvania Railroad. The brothers did backbreaking, muscle-straining work for 10 hours a day at the shops of the Panhandle Division of the Pennsylvania Railroad. However, they always rushed through their 1-hour lunch break so they could practice football for 50 minutes before they returned to work. In the event of rain, they played euchre.

None of the brothers attended college, however, they were offered various scholarships. One brother, Frank, was offered a chance to go to Notre Dame but chose to get married instead. Meanwhile, Phil was a math genius who never had any formal education beyond the fourth grade. Ted was a football genius and is credited with originating several plays: the triple-pass, the criss-cross, and the short kickoff, which became popular plays at the college level.

== Columbus Panhandles ==
In 1907, Joe Carr resurrected and reorganized the Columbus Panhandles, a professional football team that recorded its first season in 1901 but disbanded in 1904 due to financial hardships. With his experience as a sportswriter and a sports executive in baseball, he was ready to make his mark on football, the sport he truly loved. However, if his team was to succeed, he needed an attraction. That led Carr to build his team around pro football's most famous family, the Nesser brothers. Eventually six brothers would play for the Panhandles. Carr used the Nesser brothers as the backbone of the Panhandles, and the football-playing family remained in that role for nearly twenty years.

"Getting hit by a Nesser is like falling off a moving train"

— Knute Rockne, Legendary Notre Dame Coach

Because most of the team's players were employed by the railroad, they could ride the train free of charge. Because of this perk, Carr was able to schedule mostly road games, eliminating the expenses of stadium rental, game promotion, and security for the field. This perk combined combination with the Nesser brothers, made the Panhandles a major attraction in the early days of professional football. The Nesser brothers were bigger and stronger than most of their opponents. In their prime, they averaged more than 210 pounds apiece, in an era in which the average professional lineman weighed about 180 pounds.

The Nessers were a huge draw everywhere they went. During a game against the Detroit Heralds in Navin Field (later renamed Tiger Stadium) in 1916 the team drew 7,000 spectators, even though the Heralds hiked their ticket prices from $1 to $1.50 only for games against the Panhandles and Jim Thorpe's Canton Bulldogs. The brothers were written up extensively in out-of-town newspapers, but barely received notice in their hometown of Columbus. This fact is due to the focus of Columbus fans on the Ohio State University football team. They had little interest in games played by railroad workers. As a consequence, the Panhandles never achieved much of a hometown following.

Ted's son Charlie also played briefly for the Panhandles in 1921. At the time Ted was a player-coach for the team. This led to the only time in NFL history where a father and son played together on the same team. The 1921 Panhandles team reported featured six Nesser brothers, a son (Charlie Nesser), a nephew (Ted Hopkins) and a brother-in-law (John Schneider) on the team. Four of the brothers retired as players after the 1921 season, including 46-year-old John, who held the record as the NFL's oldest player until it was later broken by George Blanda. Meanwhile, Al continue to play until 1931.

== Outside football ==
There were 12 children in the Nesser family. Ironically the only boy who didn't play football was Pete, the largest of the Nesser brothers, who weighed in at 350 pounds. The game simply didn't appeal to him. He worked as a boilermaker for the Pennsylvania Railroad for a remarkable 57 years, starting in 1890 at age 13, and continuing until his retirement in 1947. Pete died on May 29, 1954, at the age of 76.

Meanwhile, the football career of Raymond, the youngest of the brothers, remains somewhat of a mystery. It seems he only played in few games with his brothers, but he did appear in photos advertising the Panhandles. He didn't follow his brothers into the boilermaker trade, either; instead he became a police officer for the city of Columbus. Raymond died on September 2, 1969, at the age of 71.

== Other teams ==
The Nessers also played for the Massillon Tigers, Akron Indians, Akron Pros, Canton Bulldogs, Shelby Blues, Cleveland Panthers and the New York Giants. Ted, the first Nesser to make money at football, played for Massillon's state championship team in 1904, 1905 and 1906. Older brother John also played for the Tigers, in 1905, before Carr formed the Panhandles in 1907. Meanwhile, Al won two NFL Championships with the Akron Pros (1920) and the New York Giants (1927). Frank was usually recruited by Peggy Parratt to play for his Akron Indians.

== Other sports ==
The Nessers were not restricted to playing only football. In addition to football Phil was a champion hammer thrower. Meanwhile, Fred was a professional boxer who was considered a legitimate contender for the heavyweight title, held by Jess Willard. However, in 1915, a broken wrist ended his boxing career. Frank was also a star baseball player who never ranked below third in batting in the Ohio State League and the Southern Association during his six years as a pro.

== Recognition ==
In 1987, Fred's daughter Vera tried to get Columbus to name a street after the football pioneering brothers, however her request was rejected. A display recognizing the Nessers' contributions to pro football is on display at the Pro Football Hall of Fame, although none of the brothers have been formally inducted into the Hall.
