= Charlie Nesser =

American football player (1903–1970)

No. 1
- Position: Halfback

Personal information
- Born: November 30, 1902; Columbus, Ohio, U.S.
- Died: February 26, 1970 (aged 67); Franklin County, Ohio, U.S.
- Listed height: 6 ft 2 in (1.88 m)
- Listed weight: 182 lb (83 kg)

Career information
- College: None

Career history
- Columbus Panhandles (1921)

Career statistics
- Games played: 9
- Games started: 6

Charles Theodore Nesser (November 30, 1902 – February 26, 1970) was a professional football player in the National Football League (NFL) for the Columbus Panhandles. He played only one season, 1921, in the NFL. He was son of Ted Nesser, a member of the Nesser brothers. During the 1921 season, six of the Nessers played for the Panhandles, with Charlie being the seventh family member on the team. The 1921 team was coached by his father, Ted, who served as a player-coach. They are the only father-son combination to play together in NFL history.

== Additional sources ==
- Peterson, Robert W. (1997). Pigskin: The Early Years of Pro Football. Oxford University Press. ISBN 0-19-511913-4.
