= Columbus Panhandles =

Professional American football team based in Columbus, Ohio

General information
- Founded: 1901; 125 years ago
- Folded: 1926; 100 years ago
- Stadium: Indianola Park (1909–1915); Traveling team Neil Park
- Headquartered: Columbus, Ohio, United States
- Colors: Burgundy, gold, white (Panhandles) Black, gold, white (Tigers)

Personnel
- Owners: Joseph F. Carr (1904, 1907–1922); Various businessmen (1922–1926)
- Head coach: William Butler (1901); Harry Greenwood (1902); E.E. Griest (1903); Joseph Carr (1904–1919); Ted Nesser (1920–1921); Herb Dell (1922); Pete Stinchcomb (1923); Gus Tebell (1923); Red Weaver (1924–1925); Jack Heldt (1926)

Nickname
- the "Handles"

Team history
- Panhandle railroad team (1901); Columbus Panhandles (1902–1922); Columbus Tigers (1923–1926)

League / conference affiliations
- Ohio League (1904–1920); National Football League (1920–1926)

The Columbus Panhandles were a professional American football team based in Columbus, Ohio. The club was founded in 1901 by workers at the Panhandle shops of the Pennsylvania Railroad. They were a part of the Ohio League from 1904 before folding after one season. Three years later, the team tried again, playing in the Ohio League from 1907 to 1919, not winning a championship, before becoming charter members of the American Professional Football Association (APFA) which became the National Football League (NFL).

The Panhandles are credited with playing in the first NFL game against the Dayton Triangles. They have no NFL championships, but Joseph Carr, the team's owner from 1907 to 1922, is enshrined in the Pro Football Hall of Fame for his work as NFL president.

== Origins ==
The earliest existence of the Panhandles was in 1900; the Columbus Press-Post reported Jack Walsh creating the "Panhandle railroad team" consisting of "big hardy railroad men." No other articles in 1900 were written about the Panhandles. A game was scheduled for October 19 of next year, however, no source provided an outcome. In 1901, managed by William Butler of the Ohio Medical University, the Panhandles played two games against the Columbus Barracks, a team consisting of local soldiers. The results were split; the first was a 2–6 loss while the second was a 12–6 win.

Butler left the Panhandles for unknown reasons, and the new manager for the 1902 season was Harry Greenwood. Greenwood placed advertisements in every newspaper he could in order to schedule games against local opponents. His ad read "The Panhandle Athletic Club has organized a football team and would like to play any college, high school or manufacturing team on Saturday or Sunday." As a result, the Panhandles scheduled four games in 1902: three against the Columbus Barracks and one against the Dennison Panhandles, and finished with a 0–3–1 record.

Again, the Panhandles got a new manager for the 1903 season, E. E. Griest. Griest needed help with the team, so he hired Ben Chamberlain to coach the team. After an exhibition game against the Ohio State Buckeyes, the Panhandles won their first game of the season, a 38–0 victory over Neil Avenue Athletic Club. This victory gave the team some unexpected press; the Columbus Citizen wrote the first article praising the team. The Panhandles' 1903 season ended with a 5–3 record.

=== Joe Carr ===
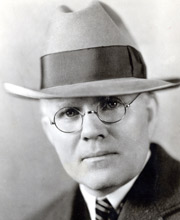
Joseph Carr directed the Panhandles in 1907 until 1922.

In 1904, Joseph Carr, who was a sports writer for the Ohio State Journal and manager of the railroad's baseball team the Famous Panhandle White Sox, took over the football team. However, the Panhandles didn't take off and the team played just two games. Carr tried again three years later in 1907. Carr saw the potential for professional football not only to be a great spectator sport but also to become a successful business venture and envisioned pro football being just as popular as Major League Baseball.

One of the first things Carr did when he became the owner of the Panhandles was to exploit one of the railroad's policies. Since most of the team's players were employed by the railroad, they could ride the train free of charge. Because of this perk, Carr was able to schedule mostly road games, eliminating the expenses of stadium rental, game promotion, and security for the field. While the team did play the majority of their games on the road as a traveling team, their home games were played at Indianola Park.

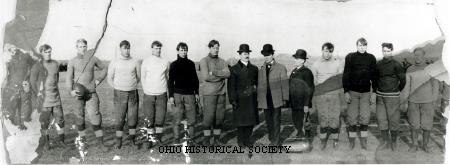
The Columbus Panhandles in 1907

The Panhandles adopted an amateur sandlot mentality for their playing style. Since the team was composed mainly of railroad workers, the scenario gave the players limited time to practice and prepare for games. The Panhandles did the majority of their preparation during their lunch breaks. Workers had a one-hour break during a normal workday, and the players on the team usually took the first 15 minutes to eat lunch and used the remaining 45 minutes to practice football. An athletic field behind the railroad shops in Columbus became the team's practice field.

=== The Nessers ===
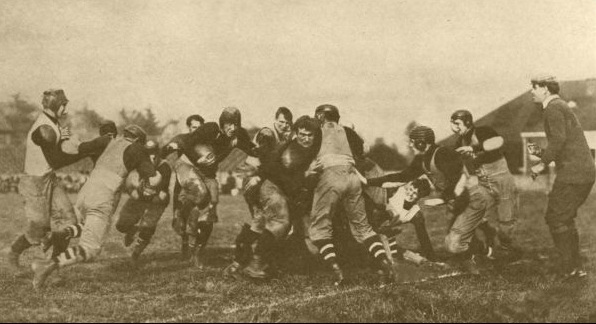
The Columbus Panhandles playing a game during the 1910s at Indianola Park.

However Carr knew that if his team was to succeed, he needed an attraction. Carr built his team around pro football's most famous family, the Nesser Brothers, who were already drawing crowds throughout the country. Carr used the seven Nesser brothers as the backbone of the Panhandles, and the football-playing family remained in that role for nearly 20 years. None of the Nessers attended college, despite many offers. The seven Nesser brothers, who worked as boilermakers for the Pennsylvania Railroad, were exceptionally large and strong for people living in the early 20th century. Frank Nesser was 6-foot 1-inch tall and weighed 235 pounds. They all were exceptionally great athletes for their time. Carr took out ads describing his Panhandles as the toughest professional team in football, led by the famous Nesser brothers. In 1921 the Panhandles line-up included player-coach Ted Nesser and his son Charlie. It is the only time in NFL history a father and son played together on the same team. The Nesser brothers' nephew, Ted Hopkins, and brother-in-law, John Schneider, also played on the team.

The Panhandles' rosters did not include many former college players or All-Americans, so the athletic field in the railroad yards was the place where the team found out who could play. The team's "dirty" reputation was learned and developed on the railroad yards, not in college stadiums. The press sometimes criticized the Panhandles for their rough play, but it was a big draw for the fans and a main reason many paid to attend games.

=== Columbus city champs era ===
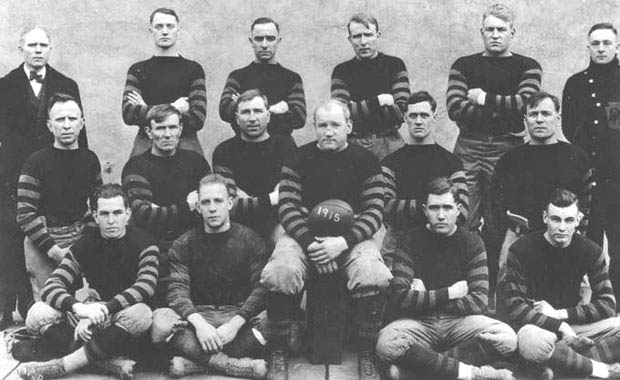
The 1915 Columbus Panhandles team.

Over a span of 20 years, the Panhandles were considered the best pro team in the city of Columbus. The team compiled a 33–5 record against opponents from Columbus, including a 32–1 record over their last 33 games.

Between 1914 and 1916, which were seen as the best years of the franchise, the Nesser-led team went a combined 22–10–1. The majority of the early pro teams would go out of their way to schedule the Panhandles, as they knew it would be easy to advertise a game featuring the famous Nessers. In 1915, the Panhandles were rumored to have played against the legendary Knute Rockne six times in 1915. According to the team, each time they played Rockne, he was on a different team. This rumor, however, is false; Rockne was too much of a family man to play that much pro football, and Notre Dame had most of its home games during the pro football season.

== NFL ==
On August 20, 1920, a meeting attended by representatives of four Ohio League teams—the Canton Bulldogs, the Cleveland Tigers, the Dayton Triangles, and the Akron Pros—was held. At the meeting, the representatives tentatively agreed to introduce a salary cap for the teams, not to sign college players nor players under contract with another team, and became united as the American Professional Football Conference. They then contacted other major professional teams and invited them to a meeting for September 17.

At the meeting in September, held at Ralph Hay's Hupmobile showroom, representatives of the Rock Island Independents, the Muncie Flyers, the Decatur Staleys, the Massillon Tigers, the Chicago Cardinals, the Rochester Jeffersons, and the Hammond Pros were present. The following was achieved: the name of American Professional Football Association was chosen; officers of the league were elected with Jim Thorpe as president; a membership fee of $100 was set; a committee to draft a constitution was named; the secretary of the league was to receive a list of all players used during the season by January 1, 1921; and the trophy that would be awarded to the league champions. During this time, the Panhandles were admitted into the league.

=== First APFA game ===
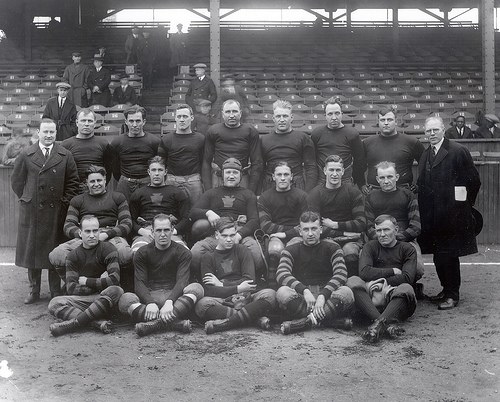
1921 Columbus Panhandles of the National Football League-

The Panhandles may have played in the first game with two APFA opponents. However, due to not having the games start at a standardized time, and the failure of the future NFL to record the start times, historians can not determine for sure which two teams played in the first league match-up. What is known for a fact is that the first contests between teams listed as APFA members occurred on October 3, 1920. On that date, the Panhandles were defeated by the Dayton Triangles, 14–0, at Triangle Park, and the Rock Island Independents beat the Muncie Flyers, 45–0, in Rock Island. Frank Bacon of the Triangles is credited with the first punt return for a touchdown.

=== Columbus Tigers ===
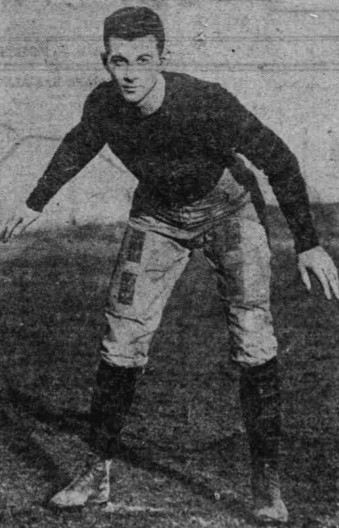
Jack Sack

Following the 1921 season, Carr became the league's new president and renamed the APFA, the NFL. He then discontinued the Panhandles after the 1922 season because of cost and salary demands. Following the 1922 season, the Panhandles became the Columbus Tigers. In 1923, the Tigers attained their best ranking in the NFL, finishing eighth. During that season multiple players won awards. Rookie end Gus Tebell, who was also the coach, was awarded 1st Team All NFL by the Canton Daily News as well as the Green Bay Press-Gazette. Gus Sonnenberg, Paul Goebel, Jack Sack, and Bob Rapp were all awarded 1st Team All-NFL by the Canton Daily News. Pete Stinchcomb was awarded 2nd Team All-NFL by Collyer's Eye. During this time, and at the time of the team folding, Jerry Corcoran was owner of the Tigers.

The next season, they finished tenth. Boni Petcoff was awarded 1st Team All-NFL by the Green Bay Press-Gazette. Petcoff and Paul Goebel were both awarded 2nd Team All NFL by the Green Bay Press-Gazette, with the latter being awarded 2nd Team All NFL by the Collyer's Eye as well. Then, the Tigers ended their final two seasons 20th and 19th, respectively.

== Hall-of-Famers ==
Columbus Panhandles Hall of Famers
Coaches and contributors
Name	Position	Tenure	Inducted
Joseph F. Carr	Head coach Owner/GM	1901–1904, 1907–1918; 1907–1922	1963

=== Notable players ===
- Nesser Brothers
- Jack Sack (1902–1980)

== Season records ==
Season	Team	League	Regular season				Ref
Season	Team	League	Finish	W	L	T	Ref
Columbus Panhandles
1901	1901			1	1	0	
1902	1902			0	3	1	
1903	1903			5	3	0	
1904	1904	Ohio		2	0	0	
1905	1905	No team					
1906	1906	No team					
1907	1907	Ohio		2	3	1	
1908	1908	Ohio		3	3	1	
1909	1909	Ohio		7	1	1	
1910	1910	Ohio		3	2	2	
1911	1911	Ohio		5	4	1	
1912	1912	Ohio		3	5	1	
1913	1913	Ohio		3	4	1	
1914	1914	Ohio		7	2	0	
1915	1915	Ohio		8	3	1	
1916	1916	Ohio		7	5	0	
1917	1917	Ohio		2	6	0	
1918	1918	Ohio		0	1	0	
1919	1919	Ohio		3	6	1	
1920	1920	APFA	13th	2	6	2	
1921	1921	APFA	17th	1	8	0	
1922	1922	NFL	18th	0	8	0	
Columbus Tigers
1923	1923	NFL	8th	5	4	1	
1924	1924	NFL	10th	4	4	0	
1925	1925	NFL	20th	0	9	0	
1926	1926	NFL	19th	1	6	0	
