= Dutch Speck =

American football player (1886–1952)

No. 14 (1921) 17 (1922, 1925) 21 (1923) 18 (1926)
- Position: Offensive Lineman

Personal information
- Born: July 30, 1886; Canton, Ohio, U.S.
- Died: November 18, 1952 (aged 66); Canton, Ohio, U.S.
- Listed height: 5 ft 10 in (1.78 m)
- Listed weight: 220 lb (100 kg)

Career information
- College: None

Career history
- 1910: Shelby Blues
- 1910: Canton Nutshell Tigers
- 1911–1913: Canton Professionals
- 1913: Elyria Athletics
- 1913: Coleman Athletic Club
- 1914: Canton Professionals
- 1915–1923: Canton Bulldogs
- 1924: Akron Pros
- 1925–1926: Canton Bulldogs

Awards and highlights
- 2× NFL champion (1922, 1923); 4× Ohio League champion (1910, 1916, 1917, 1919)
- Stats at Pro Football Reference

Norman John Speck (July 30, 1886 – November 18, 1952) was a professional football player during the early years of the National Football League (NFL). Speck won two NFL championships with the Canton Bulldogs in 1922 and 1923. He played for the Professionals-Bulldogs team during their time in the Ohio League from 1911 until 1919, with the only exception being in 1913, when Speck left Canton after three games to join the Elyria Athletics. After a 20-0 defeat to the Akron Indians, Speck, and seven other former Athletics showed up under the name of the Coleman Athletic Club to challenge Canton. Coleman then defeated Canton 26-0. Speck also played during the 1924 season with the Akron Pros, however most of his professional career was spent with Canton.
