= 1913 Akron Indians season =

American football team season

- Head coach: Peggy Parratt
- Home stadium: League Park

Results
- Record: 11-1
- Division place: No divisions
- Playoffs: No playoffs

The 1913 Akron Indians season was their sixth season in existence. The team played in the Ohio League and posted an 11–1 record to win their third state title.

== Schedule ==
Week	Date	Opponent	Result	Record
1	September 21	Cleveland Genesees	W 47–0	1–0
2	September 28	Columbus Nationals	W 61–0	2–0
3	October 5	Elyria Athletics	L 14–16	2–1
4	October 12	Columbus Panhandles	W 19–0	3–1
5	November 19	Dayton Oakwoods	W 45–0	4–1
6	November 26	Elyria Athletics	W 20–0	5–1
7	November 2	Toledo Maroons	W 47–0	6–1
8	November 16	Shelby Blues	W 20–0	7–1
9	November 23	McKeesport Olympics	W 60–0	8–1
10	November 27	Shelby Blues	T 7–7	8–1–1
11	November 27	Canton Professionals	T 7–7	8–1–2
12	November 30	Coleman Athletic Club	W 30–0	9–1–2
13	December 7	Canton Professionals	Cancelled	9–1–2
