= Professional American football championship games =

List of sports championships

Below is a list of professional football Championship Games in the United States, involving:

- the informal western Pennsylvania professional football circuit (WPC, 1890 to c.1910);
- the 1902 "National" Football League and the World Series of Professional Football (WSF, 1902–1903);
- the Ohio Independent Championship (OIC, 1903–1919);
- the New York Pro Football League (NYPFL, 1916–1919);
- the American Professional Football Association and the National Football League (NFL, 1920–present);
- the All-America Football Conference (AAFC, 1946–1949);
- the American Football League (AFL, 1960–1969);
- the World Football League (WFL, 1974–1975);
- the United States Football League (USFL, 1983–85);
- the XFL (2001);
- the United Football League (2009–2011);
- and any inter-league challenge games that included at least one champion of a major, or borderline-major, league.

Prior to 1920, no national professional football league existed, and play was scattered across semi-pro and professional leagues in the upper midwest. The first efforts at pro football championships were the World Series of Professional Football, featuring teams from and around New York City and the 1902 "National" Football League in Pennsylvania; two of the three "N"FL teams participated as one team in the World Series of Pro Football.

The Ohio League and New York Pro Football League were two prominent regional associations in the 1910s (the NYPFL held an actual championship game in 1919).

In 1920, teams from the Ohio League and New York Pro Football League, along with other midwestern teams, formalized into the American Professional Football Association (APFA), and the league was later renamed the National Football League (NFL).

The NFL conducted play for thirteen years before creating a "Championship Game": from 1920 through 1932, league "champions" were determined by won-loss record with ties excluded, but the schedules and rules were so ill-defined that conflicts exist to this day over who the actual champions were: some teams played more games than others, while some played against college or semi-pro teams, some played after the season was over, and some stopped play before a season was over. For example, in 1921, the Buffalo All-Americans disputed the Chicago Staleys' title, and in 1925, the Pottsville Maroons claimed the championship was theirs, not the Chicago Cardinals'. The APFA also had no official Championship Games before it changed its name to the NFL in 1922.

Boston/Washington Redskins owner George Preston Marshall, who credited with significant innovations by the NFL, convinced the NFL in 1933 to play a Championship Game between the two Division winners following the success of the 1932 Playoff Game.

Thus, 1933 was the year of the first national professional football Championship Game in the United States. See National Football League championships: note that game scores marked with a † (1921 and 1932) were de facto Championship Games, as these were the deciding games in determining a Championship, and also the last game played in that season - further, the Portsmouth Spartans, who were defeated in the 1932 Game, finished third as the Game counted in the season standings.

All games are listed under the year in which the majority of regular season games were played: especially since the 1960s, many championship games have been played in the January or, since 2002, February of the following year (i.e. the Championship Game of the 2011 NFL season was played in February 2012, but is listed here under 2011).

== Prior to 1920 ==
- 1890 (WPC) - Allegheny Athletic Association (3-2-1)
- 1891 (WPC) - Pittsburgh Athletic Club (7-0-0)
- 1892 (WPC) - Allegheny Athletic Association 4, Pittsburgh Athletic Club 0
- 1894 (WPC) - Allegheny Athletic Association 30, Pittsburgh Athletic Club 0
- 1895 (WPC) - Duquesne Country and Athletic Club 10, Pittsburgh Athletic Club 6
- 1896 (WPC) - Allegheny Athletic Association 18, Pittsburgh Athletic Club 0
- 1897 (WPC) - Greensburg Athletic Association 6, Latrobe Athletic Association 0
- 1898 (WPC) - Duquesne Country and Athletic Club 16, Western Pennsylvania All-Stars 0
- 1900 (WPC) - Homestead AC 30, East End Athletic Association (Pittsburgh) 0
- 1901 (WPC) - Homestead AC 18, Philadelphia Athletics 0
- 1902 (NFL1902) – Pittsburgh Stars 11, Philadelphia Athletics 0

(WSF) – All-Syracuse 36, Orange AC 0
(OIC) – Akron East Ends

- 1903 (OIC) – Massillon Tigers (8-1-0) 11, Akron East Ends 0

(WPC) - Latrobe Athletic Association 6, Pennsylvania Railroad YMCA 0
(WSF) – Franklin Athletic Club 12, Watertown Red & Black 0

- 1904 (OIC) – Massillon Tigers (7-0-0) 6, Akron East Ends 5

(WPC) - Latrobe Athletic Association 5, Steelton Athletic Club 0

- 1905 (OIC) – Massillon Tigers (10-0-0) 10, Canton Bulldogs 0
- 1906 (OIC) – Massillon Tigers (10-1-0) 13, Canton Bulldogs 6
- 1907 (OIC) – All-Massillons (7-0-1, won by a common-opponent tiebreaker over the Shelby Blues)
- 1908 (OIC) – Akron Indians 8-0-1
- 1909 (OIC) – Akron Indians (9-0-0) 12, Shelby Blues 9
- 1910 (OIC) – Shelby Blues/Shelby Tigers (14-0-1) 8, Akron Indians 5
- 1911 (OIC) – Shelby Blues (10-0-0) 1, Canton Bulldogs 0 (forfeit)
- 1912 (OIC) – Elyria Athletics (8-0-0)
- 1913 (OIC) – Akron Indians (8-1-2) 20, Shelby Blues 0
- 1914 (OIC) – Akron Indians (8-2-1) 21, Canton Bulldogs 0
- 1915 (OIC) – Youngstown Patricians (8-0-1) 13, Washington Vigilants 7
- 1916 (OIC) – Canton Bulldogs (9-0-1) 24, Massillon Tigers 0
- 1917 (OIC) – Canton Bulldogs (9-1-0) 7, Detroit Heralds 0

(NYPFL) – All-Tonawanda 9, Rochester Jeffersons 7

- 1918 (OIC) – Dayton Triangles (8-0-0) 62, Miamis 0

(Buffalo Semi-Pro FL) – Buffalo Niagaras 5-0-0, did not play outside Buffalo due to 1918 flu pandemic

- 1919 (OIC) – Canton Bulldogs 9-0-1

(NYPFL) – Buffalo Prospects 20, Rochester Jeffersons 0
(Self proclaim) - Rock Island Independents

== 1920-1932 ==
- 1920 (APFA) – Akron Pros (8-0-3) 0, Buffalo/Phoenixville (20-1*-1) 0; Akron wins by virtue of no losses†
- 1921 (APFA) – Chicago Staleys (10-1-1) 10, Buffalo All-Americans 7†
- 1922 (NFL) – Canton Bulldogs 10-0-2
- 1923 (NFL) – Canton Bulldogs 11-0-1
- 1924 (NFL) – Cleveland Bulldogs 7-1-1
- 1925 (NFL) – Chicago Cardinals 11-2-1
- 1926 (NFL) – Frankford Yellow Jackets 14-1-1

(NFL-AFL26 challenge) – New York Giants 31, Philadelphia Quakers 0

- 1927 (NFL) – New York Giants 11-1-1
- 1928 (NFL) – Providence Steam Roller 8-1-2
- 1929 (NFL) – Green Bay Packers 12-0-1
- 1930 (NFL) – Green Bay Packers 10-3-1
- 1931 (NFL) – Green Bay Packers 12-2-0
- 1932 (NFL) – Chicago Bears (7-1-6) 9, Portsmouth Spartans 0†

== 1933-1959 ==
- 1933 (NFL) – Chicago Bears 23, New York Giants 21
- 1934 (NFL) – New York Giants 30, Chicago Bears 13
- 1935 (NFL) – Detroit Lions 26, New York Giants 7
- 1936 (NFL) – Green Bay Packers 21, Boston Redskins 6
- 1937 (NFL) – Washington Redskins 28, Chicago Bears 21
- 1938 (NFL) – New York Giants 23, Green Bay Packers 17
- 1939 (NFL) – Green Bay Packers 27, New York Giants 0
- 1940 (NFL) – Chicago Bears 73, Washington Redskins 0
- 1940 (PCFL–AFL40) – Los Angeles Bulldogs (PCFL) 7, Columbus Bullies (AFL40) 0
- 1941 (AFL40-WIFU) – Columbus Bullies 31, Winnipeg Blue Bombers 1
- 1941 (NFL) – Chicago Bears 37, New York Giants 9
- 1942 (NFL) – Washington Redskins 14, Chicago Bears 6
- 1943 (NFL) – Chicago Bears 41, Washington Redskins 21
- 1944 (NFL) – Green Bay Packers 14, New York Giants 7
- 1944 (PCFL-AFL44) – Hollywood Rangers (AFL44) 21, San Diego Bombers (PCFL) 10
- 1945 (NFL) – Cleveland Rams 15, Washington Redskins 14
- 1946 (AAFC) – Cleveland Browns 14, New York Yankees 9
- 1946 (NFL) – Chicago Bears 24, New York Giants 14
- 1947 (AAFC) – Cleveland Browns 14, New York Yankees 3
- 1947 (NFL) – Chicago Cardinals 28, Philadelphia Eagles 21
- 1948 (AAFC) – Cleveland Browns 49 Buffalo Bills 7
- 1948 (NFL) – Philadelphia Eagles 7, Chicago Cardinals 0
- 1949 (AAFC) – Cleveland Browns 21 San Francisco 49ers 7
- 1949 (NFL) – Philadelphia Eagles 14, Los Angeles Rams 0
  - 1950 (NFL-AAFC) – Cleveland Browns 35, Philadelphia Eagles 10
- 1950 (NFL) – Cleveland Browns 30, Los Angeles Rams 28
- 1951 (NFL) – Los Angeles Rams 24, Cleveland Browns 17
- 1952 (NFL) – Detroit Lions 17, Cleveland Browns 7
- 1953 (NFL) – Detroit Lions 17, Cleveland Browns 16
- 1954 (NFL) – Cleveland Browns 56, Detroit Lions 10
- 1955 (NFL) – Cleveland Browns 38, Los Angeles Rams 14
- 1956 (NFL) – New York Giants 47, Chicago Bears 7
- 1957 (NFL) – Detroit Lions 59, Cleveland Browns 14
- 1958 (NFL) – Baltimore Colts 23, New York Giants 17 (OT)
- 1959 (NFL) – Baltimore Colts 31, New York Giants 16

== 1960-1969 ==
- 1960 (AFL) – Houston Oilers 24, Los Angeles Chargers 16
- 1960 (NFL) – Philadelphia Eagles 17, Green Bay Packers 13
- 1961 (AFL) – Houston Oilers 10, San Diego Chargers 3
- 1961 (NFL) – Green Bay Packers 37, New York Giants 0
- 1962 (AFL) – Dallas Texans 20, Houston Oilers 17 (double OT)
- 1962 (NFL) – Green Bay Packers 16, New York Giants 7
- 1963 (AFL) – San Diego Chargers 51, Boston Patriots 10
- 1963 (NFL) – Chicago Bears 14, New York Giants 10
- 1964 (AFL) – Buffalo Bills 20, San Diego Chargers 7
- 1964 (NFL) – Cleveland Browns 27, Baltimore Colts 0
- 1965 (AFL) – Buffalo Bills 23, San Diego Chargers 0
- 1965 (NFL) – Green Bay Packers 23, Cleveland Browns 12
- 1966 (AFL) – Kansas City Chiefs 31, Buffalo Bills 7
- 1966 (NFL) – Green Bay Packers 34, Dallas Cowboys 27
- 1966 1st World Championship (Super Bowl I) – 1/15/67 NFL Green Bay Packers 35, AFL Kansas City Chiefs 10
- 1967 (AFL) – Oakland Raiders 40, Houston Oilers 7
- 1967 (NFL) – Green Bay Packers 21, Dallas Cowboys 17
- 1967 2nd World Championship (Super Bowl II) – 1/14/68 NFL Green Bay Packers 33, AFL Oakland Raiders 14
- 1968 (AFL) – New York Jets 27, Oakland Raiders 23
- 1968 (NFL) – Baltimore Colts 34, Cleveland Browns 0
- 1968 3rd World Championship (Super Bowl III) – 1/12/69 AFL New York Jets 16, NFL Baltimore Colts 7
- 1969 (AFL) – Kansas City Chiefs 17, Oakland Raiders 7
- 1969 (NFL) – Minnesota Vikings 27, Cleveland Browns 7
- 1969 4th World Championship (Super Bowl IV) – 1/11/70 AFL Kansas City Chiefs 23, NFL Minnesota Vikings 7

== 1970–present ==
- 1970 (NFL) – Super Bowl V – 1/17/71 AFC Baltimore Colts 16, NFC Dallas Cowboys 13
- 1971 (NFL) – Super Bowl VI – 1/16/72 NFC Dallas Cowboys 24, AFC Miami Dolphins 3
- 1972 (NFL) – Super Bowl VII – 1/14/73 AFC Miami Dolphins 14, NFC Washington Redskins 7
- 1973 (NFL) – Super Bowl VIII – 1/13/74 AFC Miami Dolphins 24, NFC Minnesota Vikings 7
- 1974 (WFL) – World Bowl 1 – 12/5/74 Birmingham Americans 22, Florida Blazers 21
- 1974 (NFL) – Super Bowl IX – 1/12/75 AFC Pittsburgh Steelers 16, NFC Minnesota Vikings 6
- 1975 (WFL) – Split season: First half of season was won by Memphis Southmen at 7–2, but the second half was not completed as the league collapsed. The Birmingham Vulcans had the best overall record for the season.
- 1975 (NFL) – Super Bowl X – 1/18/76 AFC Pittsburgh Steelers 21, NFC Dallas Cowboys 17
- 1976 (NFL) – Super Bowl XI – 1/09/77 AFC Oakland Raiders 32, NFC Minnesota Vikings 14
- 1977 (NFL) – Super Bowl XII – 1/15/78 NFC Dallas Cowboys 27, AFC Denver Broncos 10
- 1978 (NFL) – Super Bowl XIII – 1/21/79 AFC Pittsburgh Steelers 35, NFC Dallas Cowboys 31
- 1979 (NFL) – Super Bowl XIV – 1/20/80 AFC Pittsburgh Steelers 31, NFC Los Angeles Rams 19
- 1980 (NFL) – Super Bowl XV – 1/25/81 AFC Oakland Raiders 27, NFC Philadelphia Eagles 10
- 1981 (NFL) – Super Bowl XVI – 1/24/82 NFC San Francisco 49ers 26, AFC Cincinnati Bengals 21
- 1982 (NFL) – Super Bowl XVII – 1/30/83 NFC Washington Redskins 27, AFC Miami Dolphins 17
- 1983 (NFL) – Super Bowl XVIII – 1/22/84 AFC Los Angeles Raiders 38, NFC Washington Redskins 9
- 1984 (NFL) – Super Bowl XIX – 1/20/85 NFC San Francisco 49ers 38, AFC Miami Dolphins 16
- 1985 (NFL) – Super Bowl XX – 1/26/86 NFC Chicago Bears 46, AFC New England Patriots 10
- 1986 (NFL) – Super Bowl XXI – 1/25/87 NFC New York Giants 39, AFC Denver Broncos 20
- 1987 (NFL) – Super Bowl XXII – 1/31/88 NFC Washington Redskins 42, AFC Denver Broncos 10
- 1988 (NFL) – Super Bowl XXIII – 1/22/89 NFC San Francisco 49ers 20, AFC Cincinnati Bengals 16
- 1989 (NFL) – Super Bowl XXIV – 1/28/90 NFC San Francisco 49ers 55, AFC Denver Broncos 10
- 1990 (NFL) – Super Bowl XXV – 1/27/91 NFC New York Giants 20, AFC Buffalo Bills 19
- 1991 (NFL) – Super Bowl XXVI – 1/26/92 NFC Washington Redskins 37, AFC Buffalo Bills 24
- 1992 (NFL) – Super Bowl XXVII – 1/31/93 NFC Dallas Cowboys 52, AFC Buffalo Bills 17
- 1993 (NFL) – Super Bowl XXVIII – 1/30/94 NFC Dallas Cowboys 30, AFC Buffalo Bills 13
- 1994 (NFL) – Super Bowl XXIX – 1/29/95 NFC San Francisco 49ers 49, AFC San Diego Chargers 26
- 1995 (NFL) – Super Bowl XXX – 1/28/96 NFC Dallas Cowboys 27, AFC Pittsburgh Steelers 17
- 1996 (NFL) – Super Bowl XXXI – 1/26/97 NFC Green Bay Packers 35, AFC New England Patriots 21
- 1997 (NFL) – Super Bowl XXXII – 1/25/98 AFC Denver Broncos 31, NFC Green Bay Packers 24
- 1998 (NFL) – Super Bowl XXXIII – 1/31/99 AFC Denver Broncos 34, NFC Atlanta Falcons 19
- 1999 (NFL) – Super Bowl XXXIV – 1/30/00 NFC St. Louis Rams 23, AFC Tennessee Titans 16
- 2000 (NFL) – Super Bowl XXXV – 1/28/01 AFC Baltimore Ravens 34, NFC New York Giants 7
- 2001 (NFL) – Super Bowl XXXVI – 2/03/02 AFC New England Patriots 20, NFC St. Louis Rams 17
- 2002 (NFL) – Super Bowl XXXVII – 1/26/03 NFC Tampa Bay Buccaneers 48, AFC Oakland Raiders 21
- 2003 (NFL) – Super Bowl XXXVIII – 2/1/04 AFC New England Patriots 32, NFC Carolina Panthers 29
- 2004 (NFL) – Super Bowl XXXIX – 2/6/05 AFC New England Patriots 24, NFC Philadelphia Eagles 21
- 2005 (NFL) – Super Bowl XL – 2/5/06 AFC Pittsburgh Steelers 21, NFC Seattle Seahawks 10
- 2006 (NFL) – Super Bowl XLI – 2/4/07 AFC Indianapolis Colts 29, NFC Chicago Bears 17
- 2007 (NFL) – Super Bowl XLII – 2/3/08 NFC New York Giants 17, AFC New England Patriots 14
- 2008 (NFL) – Super Bowl XLIII – 2/1/09 AFC Pittsburgh Steelers 27, NFC Arizona Cardinals 23
- 2009 (UFL) – 2009 UFL Championship Game – 11/27/09 Las Vegas Locomotives 20, Florida Tuskers 17 (OT)
- 2009 (NFL) – Super Bowl XLIV – 2/7/10 NFC New Orleans Saints 31, AFC Indianapolis Colts 17
- 2010 (UFL) – 2010 UFL Championship Game – 11/27/10 Las Vegas Locomotives 23, Florida Tuskers 20
- 2010 (NFL) – Super Bowl XLV – 2/6/11 NFC Green Bay Packers 31, AFC Pittsburgh Steelers 25
- 2011 (UFL) – 2011 UFL Championship Game – 10/21/11 Virginia Destroyers 17, Las Vegas Locomotives 3
- 2011 (NFL) – Super Bowl XLVI – 2/5/12 NFC New York Giants 21, AFC New England Patriots 17
- 2012 (NFL) – Super Bowl XLVII – 2/3/13 AFC Baltimore Ravens 34, NFC San Francisco 49ers 31
- 2013 (NFL) – Super Bowl XLVIII – 2/2/14 NFC Seattle Seahawks 43, AFC Denver Broncos 8
- 2014 (NFL) – Super Bowl XLIX – 2/1/15 AFC New England Patriots 28, NFC Seattle Seahawks 24
- 2015 (NFL) – Super Bowl 50 – 2/7/16 AFC Denver Broncos 24, NFC Carolina Panthers 10
- 2016 (NFL) - Super Bowl LI - 2/5/17 AFC New England Patriots 34, NFC Atlanta Falcons 28 (OT)
- 2017 (NFL) - Super Bowl LII - 2/4/18 NFC Philadelphia Eagles 41, AFC New England Patriots 33
- 2018 (NFL) - Super Bowl LIII - 2/3/19 AFC New England Patriots 13, NFC Los Angeles Rams 3
- 2019 (NFL) - Super Bowl LIV - 2/2/20 AFC Kansas City Chiefs 31, NFC San Francisco 49ers 20
- 2020 (NFL) - Super Bowl LV - 2/7/21 NFC Tampa Bay Buccaneers 31, AFC Kansas City Chiefs 9
- 2021 (NFL) - Super Bowl LVI - 2/13/22 NFC Los Angeles Rams 23, AFC Cincinnati Bengals 20
- 2022 (NFL) - Super Bowl LVII - 2/12/23 AFC Kansas City Chiefs 38, NFC Philadelphia Eagles 35
- 2023 (NFL) - Super Bowl LVIII - 2/11/24 AFC Kansas City Chiefs 25, NFC San Francisco 49ers 22 (OT)
- 2024 (NFL) - Super Bowl LIX - 2/9/25 NFC Philadelphia Eagles 40, AFC Kansas City Chiefs 22
- 2025 (NFL) - Super Bowl LX - 2/8/26 NFC Seattle Seahawks 29, AFC New England Patriots 13

== Spring football Champions ==
- 1971 (TAFL) - San Antonio Toros 20 vs. Texarkana Titans 19
- 1983 (USFL) - Michigan Panthers 24 vs. Philadelphia Stars 22
- 1984 (USFL) - Philadelphia Stars 23 vs. Arizona Wranglers 3
- 1985 (USFL) – Baltimore Stars 28 vs. Oakland Invaders 24
- 1999 (RFL) - Mobile Admirals 14 vs. Houston Outlaws 12
- 2001 (XFL) – Million Dollar Game – Los Angeles Xtreme 38 vs. San Francisco Demons 6
- 2019 (AAF) - Shortened season: The Orlando Apollos had the best overall record when the league collapsed, and were declared champions.
- 2020 (XFL) - Shortened season: The Houston Roughnecks had the best overall record mid-season, but the second half was not completed due to the COVID-19 pandemic.
- 2022 (USFL) – Birmingham Stallions 33 vs. Philadelphia Stars 30
- 2023 (XFL) - Arlington Renegades 35 vs. DC Defenders 26;

(USFL) Birmingham Stallions 28 vs. Pittsburgh Maulers 12

An interleague championship was played March 30, 2024 as the inaugural game of the UFL.
- Birmingham Stallions 27, Arlington Renegades 14
