= 1910 Akron Indians season =

American football team season

- Home stadium: Nollans Park

Results
- Record: 6–2
- Division place: No divisions
- Playoffs: No playoffs

The 1910 Akron Indians season was their third season in existence. The team played in the Ohio League and posted a 6–2 record.

== Schedule ==
Week	Date	Opponent	Result	Record
1	October 2	Canton Blues	W 72–0	1–0
2	October 9	Akron Tigers	W 26–0	2–0
3	October 16	Cleveland Hinkle Athletic Club	W 49–6	3–0
4	October 30	Pittsburgh Lyceum	W 17–0	4–0
5	November 6	Akron East End Blues	W 12–3	5–0
6	November 13	Shelby-Mansfield Blues	L 6–16	5–1
7	November 20	Akron Tigers	W 5–0	6–1
8	November 24	at Shelby Tigers	Cancelled	6–1
8	November 24	Shelby-Mansfield Blues	L 5–8	6–2
