= 1911 Akron Indians season =

American football team season

- Home stadium: League Park

Results
- Record: 7–3
- Division place: No divisions
- Playoffs: No playoffs

The 1911 Akron Indians season was their fourth season in existence. The team played in the Ohio League and posted a 7–3 record.

== Schedule ==
Week	Date	Opponent	Result	Record
1	September 24	Cleveland Genesees	W 27–0	1–0
2	October 1	Cleveland Broadway Athletic Club	W 2–0	2–0
3	October 8	Cleveland Neagle Indians	W 37–0	3–0
4	October 15	Columbus Panhandles	W 6–3	4–0
5	October 22	Massillon Tigers	W 25–0	5–0
6	October 29	Shelby Blues	L 0–3	5–1
7	November 5	Cleveland Hinkle Athletic Club	W 16–0	6–1
8	November 19	Youngstown, Ohio	W 9–0	7–1
9	November 30	Shelby Blues	L 0–6	7–2
10	December 3	Shelby Blues	L 0–3	7–3
