= Homer Davidson =

American baseball and football player (1884–1948)

Profile
- Positions: Quarterback, kicker

Personal information
- Born: October 14, 1884; Cleveland, Ohio, U.S.
- Died: July 26, 1948 (aged 63); Detroit, Michigan, U.S.

Career information
- College: Pennsylvania

Career history

Playing
- Shelby Blues (1905–1906); Massillon Tigers (1906); Shelby Blues (1909); Shelby Tigers (1910); Shelby Blues (1911–19); Elyria Athletics (1912–1913); Coleman Athletic Club (1913); Akron Indians (1914); Massillon Tigers (1915)

Coaching
- Elyria Athletics (1912–1913)

Awards and highlights
- 5× Ohio League champion (1906, 1910, 1911, 1912, 1914)

Homer Hurd Davidson (October 14, 1884 – July 26, 1948) was an American professional Major League Baseball player for the Cleveland Naps (later renamed the Cleveland Indians in 1914). Born in Cleveland, Ohio, he played only six games for the Naps during the 1908 season. Davidson was better known as a professional football player. He played in the Ohio League, which was the direct predecessor to the modern National Football League (NFL). One veteran Ohio sportswriter once rated Davidson to be the equal of Walter Eckersall, an infamous quarterback from the University of Chicago. He attended college at the University of Pennsylvania and played on the Penn Quakers baseball team.

== Career ==
=== 1905–1908 ===
Davidson began his professional football career in 1905, as the quarterback and kicker for the Shelby Blues. Davidson was considered the greatest professional kicker of his era. He continued to play for the Blues the next season in 1906. However, he was signed to play for Massillon Tigers in the Ohio League championship against the Canton Bulldogs in a two-game series. Massillon would go on to lose the first game of the series, 10–5, but won the second game by a score of 13–6 and clinched the 1906 league championship. However rumors of a betting fix tainted the championship. After the series, Davidson returned Shelby and played there in 1907. He chose to sit out the 1908 season because he was under contract to Cleveland Naps and did not want to risk injury.

=== 1909–1911 ===
Homer Davidson
- Outfielder, Catcher
- Batted: Right Threw: Right

MLB debut
- April 25, 1908, for the Cleveland Naps

Last MLB appearance
- August 11, 1908, for the Cleveland Naps

MLB statistics
- Games Played: 6
- FLD%: 1.000
- Runs: 2
- At Bats: 4
- Stats at Baseball Reference

Teams
- Cleveland Naps 1908

Davidson returned to the Shelby Blues in 1909 and played in the league alongside, Peggy Parratt, the team's new player-coach. Homer would go on to win many games for Parratt with his punts and field goals. While there are some slight indications that Davidson and Parratt disliked each other, Davidson usually played for him anyway.

In 1910 he was recruited to play for the Shelby Tigers, where he became the team's star attraction. In 1911, the Davidson's Shelby Tigers and Parratt's Shelby Blues merged and took the "Blues" name. That season the Blues defeated the Akron Indians, 3–0, on a Davidson field goal. Due to their outstanding play Davidson and Parratt were often targeted by opposing teams on the field. In 1911, the Canton Professionals (later renamed the Canton Bulldogs) fans greeted the Blues with large signs reading "Get Parratt!" and "Get Davidson!" The team had heard rumors that the Canton Professionals had hired two professional boxers to hurt Shelby's star player. While no boxers showed up in uniform for the Professionals that game, the first half of the game resulted in several fist fights. Davidson and the Blues would go on to win the 1911 Ohio League title.

=== 1912–1913 ===
The 1912 season saw Davidson as the player-coach of the Elyria Athletics. It was rumored throughout Canton, Ohio that Elyria was being secretly managed by Paeggy Parratt, who was now the player-coach of and the Akron Indians. The conspiracy theory stated that Davidson and Parratt were going to merge their teams when it came time to play Canton. However, only two Elyria players were in the Akron line-up when the two team met that season. Davidson suffered a shoulder injury that practically ended his season during a 14–0 win over Parratt and the Indians a week later. Ed Kagy then took over as the team's quarterback. However Davidson still played as the team's kicker, since only his shoulder was injured. Davidson's kick helped the Athletics defeat the Akron Indians 10–0 and win the 1912 Ohio League title.

Homer returned to the Athletics in 1913. On October 5, the team defeated Parratt's Akron Indians 16–14 on a drop-kicked, 20-yard field goal by Davidson in the final five minutes of the game. However two weeks later Parratt defeated Elyria and Davidson, 20–0. Soon afterwards the Elyria team folded. A week later Davidson and several other ex-Athletics players were in the line-up for the newly formed Coleman Athletic Club. The team defeated Canton, 26–0 in its first game. However, the team lost the rematch 7–6, in a controversial call by the referee, named "Schleininger", who claimed that Davidson missed a 28-yard field goal that would have given Coleman a 9–6 victory. Davidson disagreed violently with the referee, who just happened to be a Canton resident.

=== 1914–1915 ===
In 1914 Davidson rejoined Parratt and played for the Akron Indians. He won another Ohio league title when the Indians defeated Canton, 20–1. The next season saw Davidson sign with the Massillon Tigers. He started the first few games at quarterback until Massillon hired Gus Dorais from the Fort Wayne Friars.
