= William B. Seaman =

American football and baseball player and coach (1875–1910)

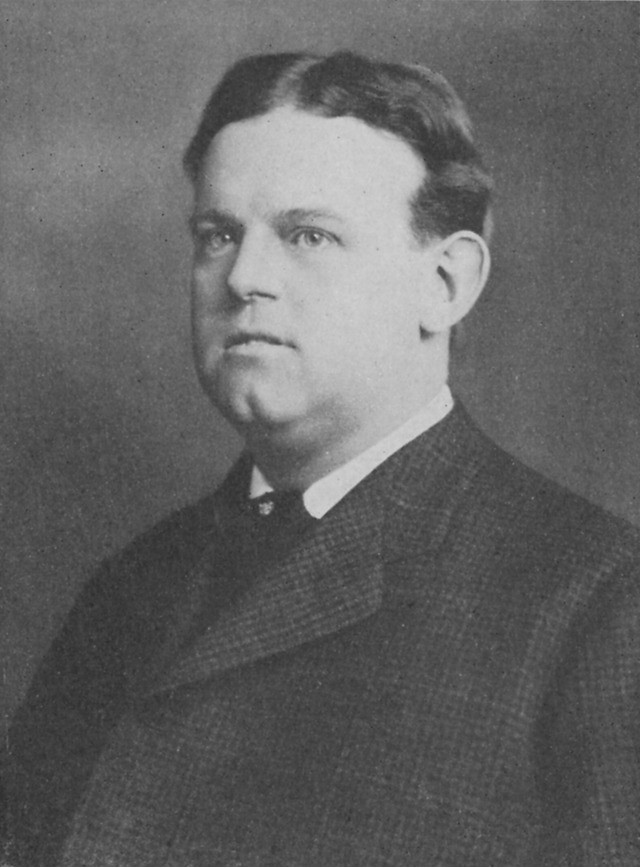

Biographical details
- Born: March 28, 1874; Washington, Pennsylvania, U.S.
- Died: April 18, 1910 (aged 36); Washington, Pennsylvania, U.S.

Playing career

Football
- 1895–1896: Washington & Jefferson
- 1896: Latrobe Athletic Association
- Position: Guard

Coaching career (HC unless noted)

Football
- 1897: Waynesburg
- 1900: Washington & Jefferson (assistant)
- 1902–1904: Washington & Jefferson
- 1906–1909: Western Reserve

Baseball
- 1906–1907: Washington Senators

Head coaching record
- Overall: 46–17–5 (football); 102–101 (baseball)

Accomplishments and honors

Championships
- 2 OAC (1907–1908)

William Bryson "Budget" Seaman ({March 28, 1874 – April 18, 1910) was an American football and baseball player and coach. He served as the head football coach at Waynesburg College by—now known as Waynesburg University–in 1897, Washington & Jefferson College from 1900 to 1904, and Western Reserve University—now known as Case Western Reserve University—from 1906 to 1909. His Western Reserve team won two Ohio Athletic Conference titles, in 1907 and 1908, during his four-year tenure.

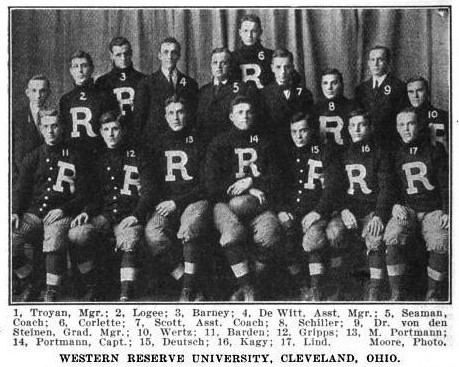
Seaman with his 1908 Western Reserve football team; players included Ed Kagy, Del Wertz, Milton "Muff" Portmann, and Ursus "Doc" Portmann

Seaman played college football as a guard at Washington & Jefferson in 1895 and 1896. He left partway through the 1896 season to play for the Latrobe Athletic Association. He began his coaching career in 1897 at Waynesburg.

As a baseball manager of the Washington Senators in the Pennsylvania–Ohio–Maryland League for its only two seasons, he posted records of 57–44 in 1906—enough for league runner-up—and 45–75 in 1907.

Seaman was to remain the Western Reserve football coach for the 1910 season. However, he caught pneumonia in April 1910 and died in his hometown of Washington, Pennsylvania.

== Head coaching record ==
=== Football ===
Year	Team	Overall	Conference	Standing	Bowl/playoffs
Waynesburg Yellow Jackets (Independent) (1897)
1897	Waynesburg	1–1			
Washington & Jefferson Red and Black (Independent) (1902–1904)
1902	Washington & Jefferson	6–4			
1903	Washington & Jefferson	8–2			
1904	Washington & Jefferson	5–3–1			
Washington & Jefferson:		19–9–1			
Western Reserve (Ohio Athletic Conference) (1906–1909)
1906	Western Reserve	4–2–3	1–2	3rd	
1907	Western Reserve	8–1	5–1	1st	
1908	Western Reserve	9–1	6–1	1st	
1909	Western Reserve	5–3–1	1–1–1	4th	
Western Reserve:		26–7–4	13–5–1		
Total:		46–17–5			
