= 1913 Canton Professionals season =

Fifth season in the Ohio League

- Head coach: Harry Hazlett
- Home stadium: League Field

Results
- Record: 4–2–2

The 1913 Canton Professionals season was their fifth season in the Ohio League. The team finished with a record of 4–2–2.

== Schedule ==
Game	Date	Opponent	Result
1	September 28	Salem Programs	W 28–0
2	October 5	Toledo Maroons	T 0–0
3	October 12	Elyria Athletics	L 0–13
4	October 26	Columbus Panhandles	W 6–0
5	November 2	at Coleman Athletic Club	L 0–26
6	November 16	Coleman Athletic Club	W 7–6
7	November 23	Altoona Indians	W 14–0
8	November 27	Akron Indians	T 7–7
