= Oscar D. Hollenbeck =

American football coach and player

Playing career
- 1907–1909: Colgate
- 1919: Akron Indians
- Positions: Center, guard

Coaching career (HC unless noted)
- 1910: Westminster (PA)

Head coaching record
- Overall: 6–2

Oscar D. Hollenbeck was an American football coach and player. He served as the head football coach at Westminster College in New Wilmington, Pennsylvania for one season, in 1910, compiling a record of 6–2. He played college football at Colgate University, lettering from 1907 to 1909. He spent one year with the Akron Indians of the Ohio League.

== Head coaching record ==
| Year | Team | Overall | Conference | Standing | Bowl/playoffs |
|---|---|---|---|---|---|
Westminster Titans (Independent) (1910)
| 1910 | Westminster | 6–2 | | | |
| Westminster: | | 6–2 | | | |
| Total: | | 6–2 | | | |
