= Harry Turner (American football) =

American football player (1887–1914)

Profile
- Position: Center

Personal information
- Born: March 5, 1887; Canton, Ohio, United States
- Died: November 15, 1914 (aged 27); Canton, Ohio, United States

Career history
- 1907: Canton Indians
- 1908: Canton Cohen Tigers
- 1909: Canton Simpson Tigers
- 1911–1914: Canton Professionals

Harry Turner (March 5, 1887 – November 15, 1914) was an American professional football player. He was one of the most popular players on the Canton Professionals, the pre-National Football League version of the Canton Bulldogs who played in the Ohio League. The team's center, Turner played with the Pros from around 1911 until his death in 1914.

== Canton Professionals ==
By 1911 Turner became the captain of the Professionals. At this time a rivalry existed between the team and Peggy Parratt, the captain of Shelby Blues. Parratt, prior to joining Shelby Blues, was the captain of the hated Massillon Tigers, the top rival for Canton.

During a game in 1911, Turner pulled his entire team from the field to protest a referee's call in favor of the Shelby blues. In a post-game statement, Turner told the Canton Repository on November 26, 1911, "Right or wrong, no more football for me after this; these old football duds, mud and dirt, go up to the attic to rot ... I'm done!"

== Death ==
Nonetheless, Turner returned to the gridiron for the next three seasons. He continued to play for the Pros and kept up the rivalry with Parratt. However, tragedy struck near the end of the 1914 season when Turner was severely injured during a game against Parratt and the Akron Indians. While making a tackle on Akron's Joe Collins, Turner's back was fractured and his spinal cord was completely severed. According to Canton manager Jack Cusack, who was at Turner's bedside when he died, his last words were "I know I must go," he said, "but I'm satisfied, for we beat Peggy Parratt." Canton won the game 6–0.

The death of Turner was taken hard by the team. It was the first fatal accident involving a major professional football team in Ohio. The Professionals easily lost a rematch to the Indians a few days later.
