= 1913 Columbus Panhandles season =

American football team season

- Head coach: Joseph F. Carr
- Home stadium: Indianola Park

Results
- Record: 3–4–2

The 1913 Columbus Panhandles season was their eighth season in existence. The team played in the Ohio League and posted a 3-4-2 record.

== Schedule ==
Game	Date	Opponent	Result
1	October 12, 1913	at Akron Indians	L 19-0
2	October 26, 1913	at Canton Professionals	L 6-0
3	November 2, 1913	at Dayton Oakwoods	T 0-0
4	November 9, 1913	Columbus Bates Pirates	Canceled
5	November 15, 1913	at McKeesport Olympics	T 0-0
6	November 16, 1913	at Cincinnati Celts	L 7-0
7	November 23, 1913	at Columbus Muldoons	W 23-0
8	November 27, 1913	at Wabash Athletic Association	L 14-3
9	November 30, 1913	Columbus Barracks	W 23-0
10	December 14, 1913	Columbus Fahrney Nationals	L 3-0
