= Joe Collins (American football) =

American football player

Profile
- Position: End

Career information
- College: Notre Dame

Career history

Playing
- 1912–1914: Akron Indians

Coaching
- 1911–1912: Heidelberg

Awards and highlights
- 2× Ohio League champion (1913, 1914)

Joseph Collins was an American football player for the University of Notre Dame in 1908 and 1909. During his time at Notre Dame, Collins discovered and recommended Knute Rockne to the football team's coach, Frank Longman.

He later played at the professional level for the Akron Indians, after being recruited by the team's coach, Peggy Parratt. In 1914, Harry Turner, the captain of the Canton Professionals (renamed the Canton Bulldogs in 1915), died when his spine broke during a tackle on Collins. Turner's death marked the first fatal accident involving a major professional football team in Ohio.
