= Milton C. Portmann =

American athlete, soldier, lawyer (1888–1967)

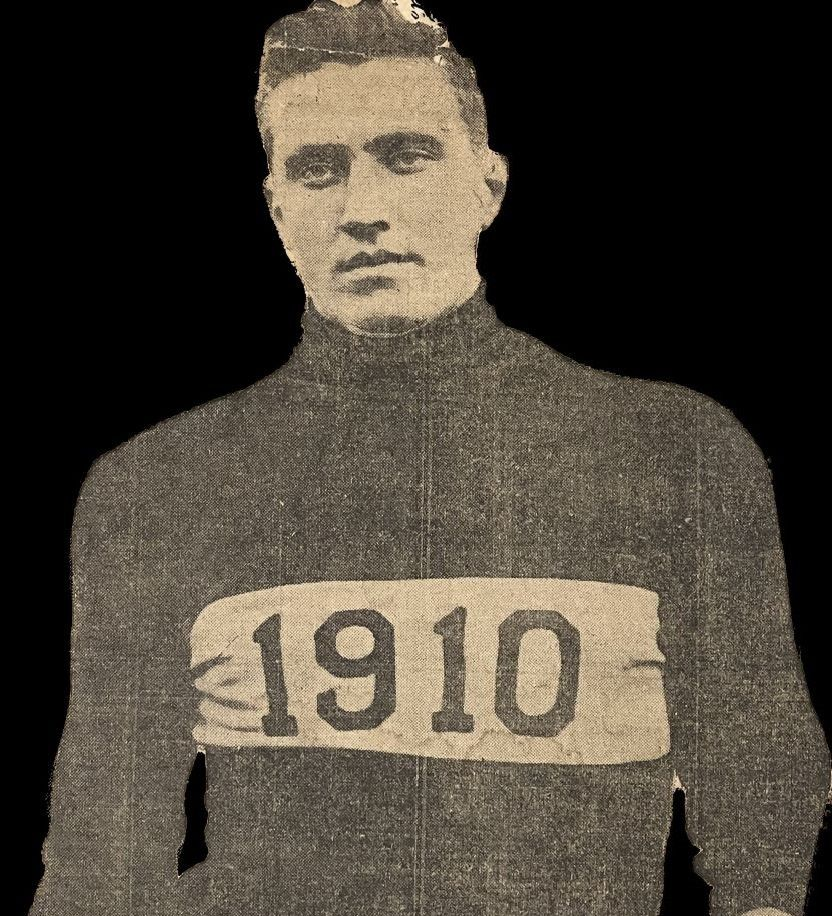
- Milton C. Portmann 1909/10 Western Reserve
- Born: October 20, 1888; Jackson, Minnesota U.S.
- Died: August 14, 1967 (aged 78); Cleveland, Ohio, U.S.
- Football career

Profile
- Position: OL/End/FB

Personal information
- Listed height: 6 ft 6 in (1.98 m)
- Listed weight: 243 lb (110 kg)

Career information
- College: Western Reserve

Career history
- 1911: Shelby Blues
- 1912–1914: Akron Indians
- 1915: Massillon Tigers
- 1916: Cleveland Indians

Awards and highlights
- 2× OAC champion (1907 and 1908); 4× Ohio League champion (1911, 1913, 1914, 1915); Hall of Fame class of 1976 Case Western Reserve
- Military career
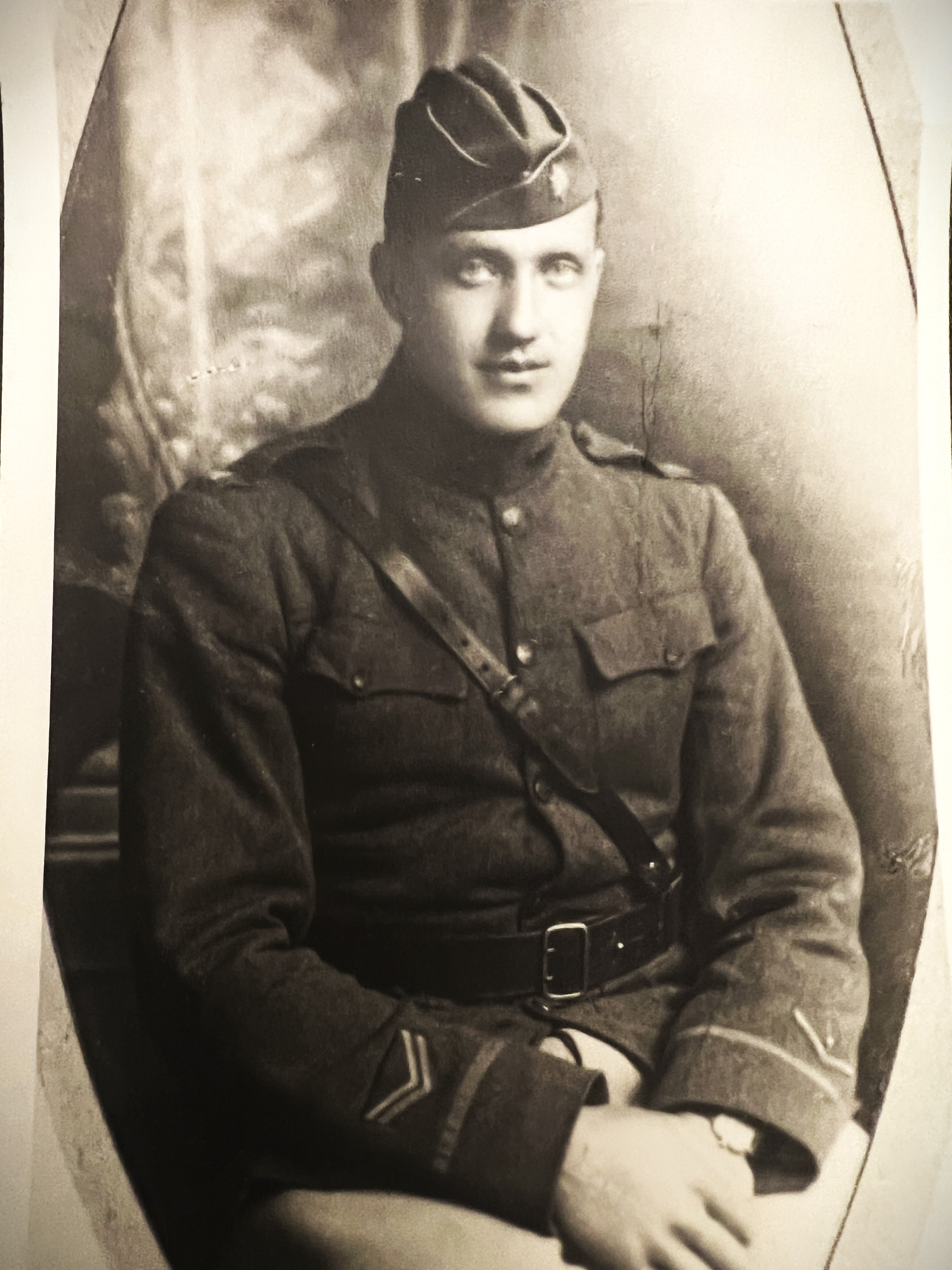
- Allegiance: United States of America
- Branch: United States Army
- Service years: 1917–1919
- Rank: Major
- Units: 89th Infantry Division; 177th Infantry Brigade; 353rd Infantry Regiment; Company E
- Commands: 1st Battalion & 2nd Battalion
- Conflicts: World War I: St. Mihiel Offensive; Meuse-Argonne Offensive; Defensive Sector; Lucey Sector (Lorraine) Aug 4 – Sept 11 1918; Euvezin Sector (Lorraine) Sept 18 – Oct 8 1918
- Awards: Silver Star; Purple Heart (1) OLC; WWI Victory Medal (4) Battle Clasps; Order of Leopold (Belgium); Croix de Guerre (Fourragère)

Milton Claudius Portmann (October 20, 1888 – August 14, 1967) was an American professional football player in the Ohio League, an attorney, and United States Army officer veteran of World War I. Milton was born in Jackson, Minnesota. Briefly he worked at his law firm Townes (Clayton C. Townes) & Portmann in Cleveland, Ohio while also playing professional football. In 1917, he enlisted in the United States Army.

== Early life and family ==
Milton Portmann was born October 20, 1888, in Jackson, Minnesota, the second born of three sons of Dr. William C. Portmann and Emma Ball. His father emigrated to the United States as a 10-year-old from Herbetswil, Switzerland with his parents in 1869. Dr. William Claudius Portmann was town physician, council member, mayor of Jackson, Minnesota, Jackson County coroner, and Jackson school board president. His uncle E.O. Portmann was President McKinley's home physician and after the president died was the First Lady's physician. His mother Emma Ball was the youngest daughter of American inventor and U.S. Civil War Colonel of the 162nd Ohio Infantry Regiment, Ephraim Ball. Portmann had two brothers, a roentgenologist Ursus and Arthur. Arthur was Senator Rob Portman's grandfather making Milton his granduncle.

== Education ==
Portmann studied Law and was a member of Delta Tau Delta fraternity. He had a role in the 1907 and 1908 OAC Championship title in football and was captain of the Western Reserve Football team in 1909/10. In track, he set two school records in one day at the Big Six Meet in Columbus. Those records in the hammer and discus throws stood unchallenged for several years. He also helped Western Reserve to a pair of victories on the ice versus CIT in 1909 and was selected to the WRU 50-Year Football All-Star Team at offensive tackle. Portmann passed the bar exam in 1911. He was inducted into the Case Western Reserve Hall of Fame in 1976.

Western Reserve Football
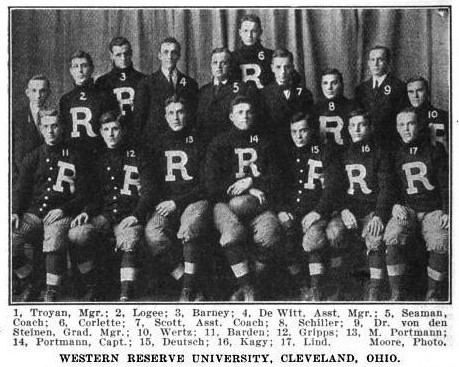
1908 Western Reserve University Football Team (Milton No. 13, brother Ursus #14)

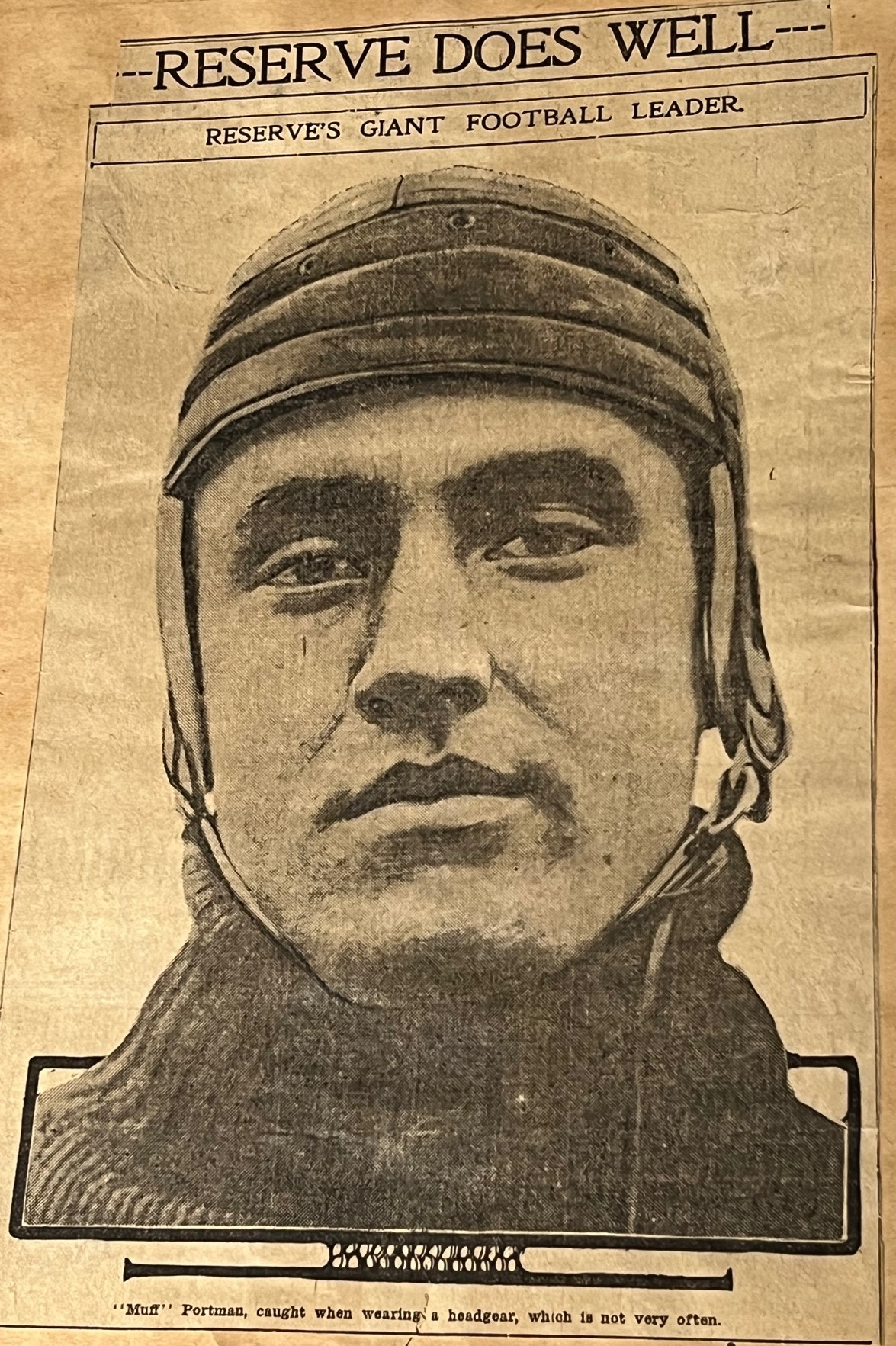
Reserve Does Well Reserves Giant Football Leader 1909

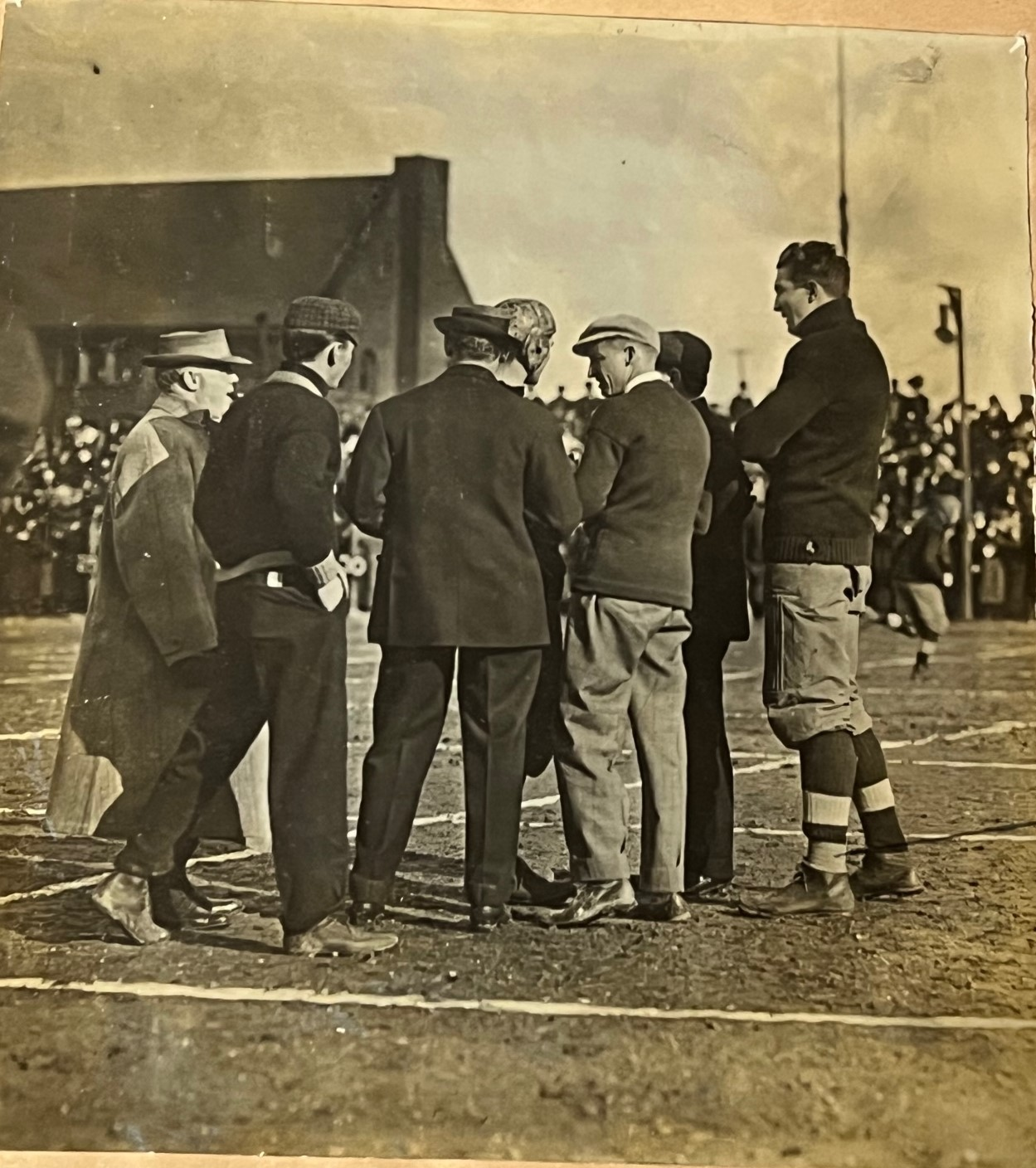
Milton Portmann with Western Reserve coaches on field sidelines in 1910 (Person furthest right)

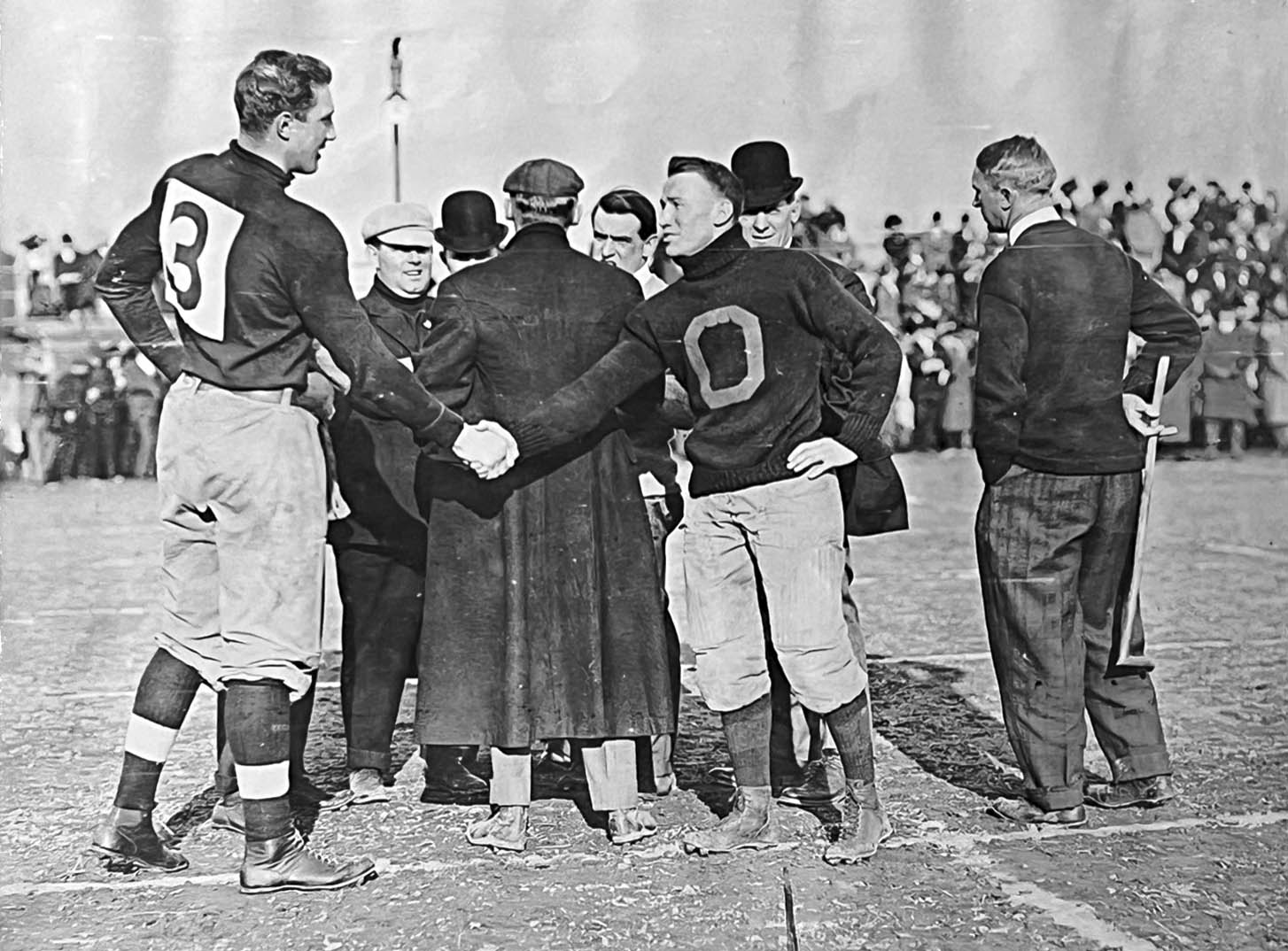
Milton Portmann (Left) shakes hands with Oberlin captain Glen Gray (Right) November 5, 1910

== Football career ==
In 1911 Portmann had his rookie professional season with the Shelby Blues. The team went 9–1 under coach and quarterback George "Peggy" Parratt. The Blues won the Ohio League title. In 1912, both Parratt and Portmann moved to Akron. Going 7–3, Akron was defeated by the Elyria Athletics for the title. In 1913 and 1914, Portmann continued play for Akron under Parratt. They won Ohio League titles in 1913, going 8–1 and 1914 going 8–2.

Portmann played in the Ohio League in 1915 with the Massillon Tigers and in 1916 with the Cleveland Indians. In the 1915 season with Massillon, he started and played three games. In 1916, Parratt joined the Cleveland Indians and recruited players including Portmann to join. He started in five games and played in six. The 1916 Cleveland Indians season was their first season in existence. In the Ohio League, Cleveland posted an 8-3-1 record. Play ended in December 1916. The following year in 1917, Portmann enlisted in the United States National Army.

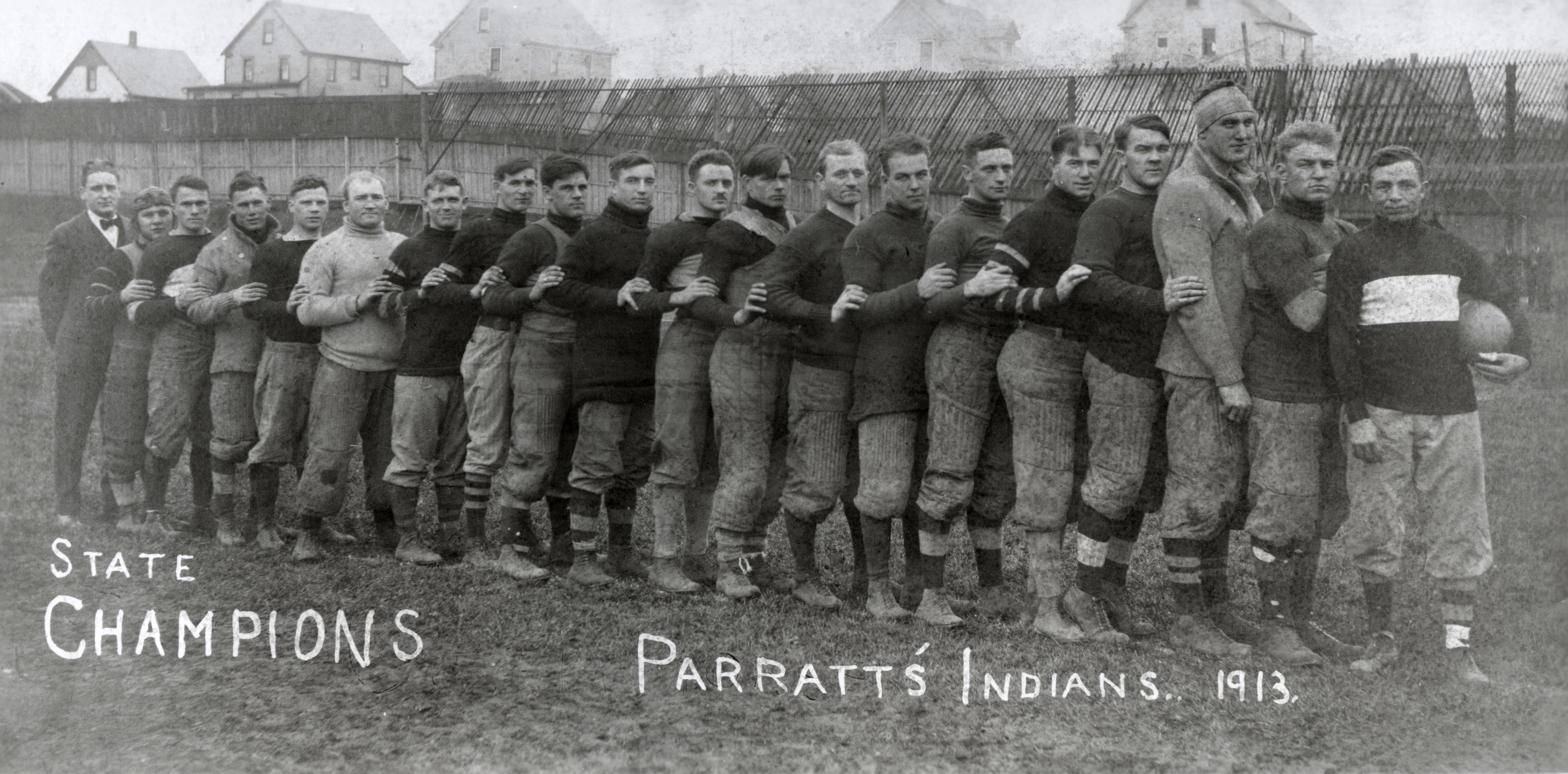
Milton Portmann and the 1913 Akron Parratt Indians (Third in from the right.)

== World War I ==
Portmann enlisted into service on August 27, 1917, at Fort Benjamin Harrison in Lawrence Township, Indiana as a Private in the Officers Reserve Corp of the National Army. He was assigned to Company E of the 353rd Infantry Regiment of the 89th Division AEF. He was stationed at Fort Benjamin Harrison from August 27, 1917, to November 27, 1917. From November 27, 1917, to May 23, 1918, he was assigned to Camp Funston in Fort Riley, Kansas and was promoted to Captain on November 27, 1917. He was stationed in Camp Funston until the 89th Division embarked on its voyage to Europe preparing for war.

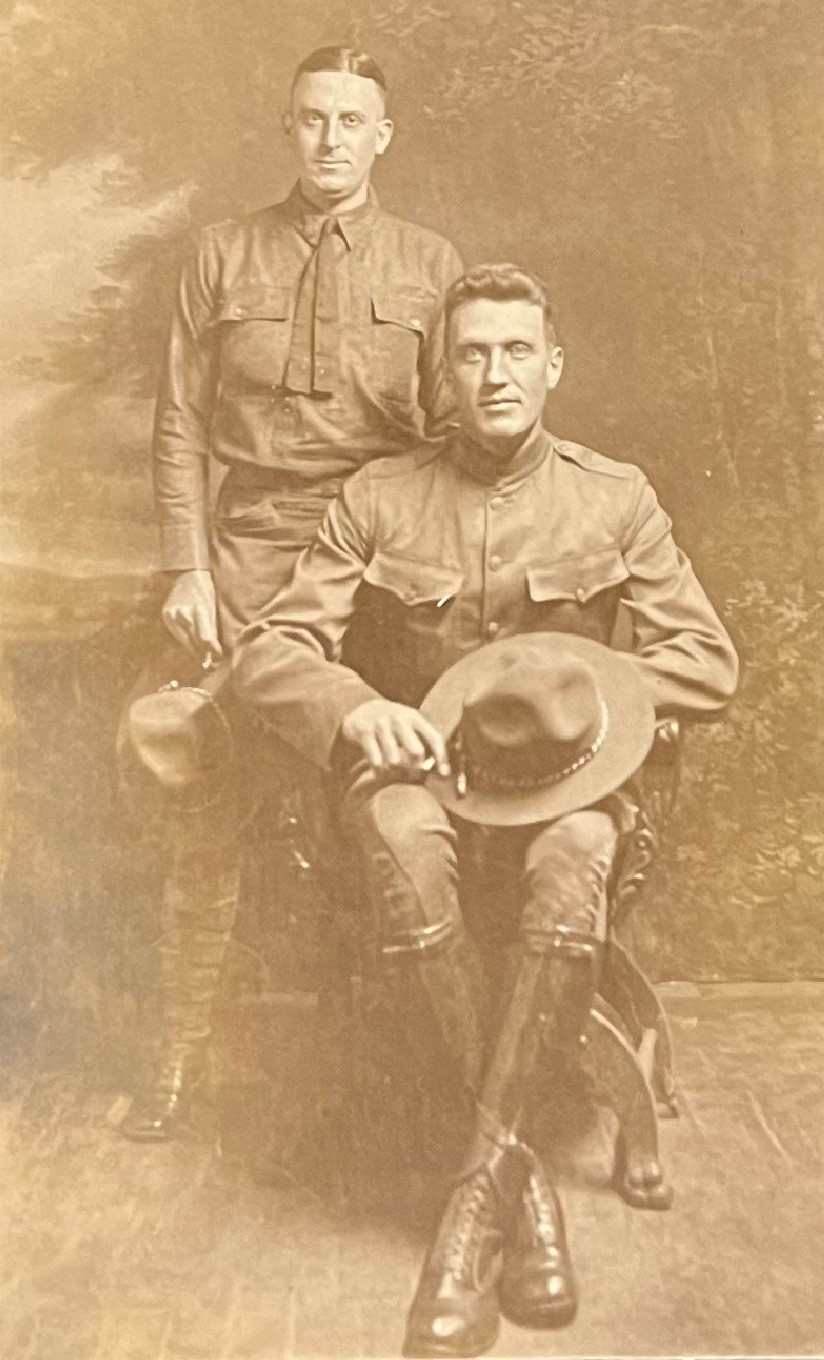
Capt. Portmann (Seated) of Co. E with 1Lt Alvin Seith of Co. M of the 353rd Infantry at Camp Funston before deployment. 1LT Seith was KIA September 30, 1918

On June 3, 1918, Portmann and the 89th Division in New York City boarded the SS Karmala. They arrived in Liverpool, England June 17, 1918. On June 25, the 2nd Battalion of the 353rd Infantry arrived in Saint-Blin, France, for combat training. Portmann assumed command of the battalion. On August 3, the 2nd Battalion left Saint-Blin to accompany and support the 1st Battalion that had already moved towards the front lines. The path of the 2nd Battalion was Saint-Blin through Liffol-le-Grand, Neufchateau, and Toul. Portmann gathered three other men of the company and patrolled No man's land. They were to take a German soldier back for questioning if possible. All three made it through the barbed-wire to encircle a German sentry without being seen. Portmann used the butt-end of his trench knife to knock out the German. They dragged him back to AEF lines before the raid was known and shooting started. The men of Company E would hold this position until August 22, 1918, when they fell back to Manonville in lieu of the 3rd Battalion.

On September 12, 1918, Portmann crashed through German barbed wire that lined their trench. Using his Army issued field glasses he looked for the MG-08 machine gun that was causing heavy casualties and a machine gun burst fired at him missing his head by a foot. The machine gun bullets had hit rocks beside him fragmenting bits of stone and bullet embedding into his face. Another gun shot went directly through his left hand. "Every officer of the company was either killed or wounded in the first 15 minutes of the fight, but Captain Milton C. Portmann, though painfully wounded continued to lead his men against these guns and put them out of action." Portmann was the only officer left in the fight. Iodine and gauze from medics treated his wounded hand and face.

During routine command patrol morning of September 17, 1918, an aid to Brigadier general Frank L. Winn, then commander of the 177th Brigade, noticed men of Company E were in plain sight of German aircraft or balloon forces. Portmann, then command officer of E, was court-martialed for this offence. 353rd infantry Col. James H Reeves defended Portmann stating,

The action of the Commanding General causes the deepest humiliation to one of the bravest, ablest and most brilliant officers that I have known. The action of Captain Portmann on September 12th was absolutely superb. There are no other words by which to describe it. He gallantly lead his company against the most exposed point attacked by our lines, suffered the heaviest casualties in his company, yet carried it on through, never lost contact with the other company of the leading echelon. After crossing the fourth objective, when the passage of the lines had been effected by the third battalion passed through the second and the third battalion was forming up in the first echelon and the second battalion in the second echelon and ready to carry forward the attack to the fifth objective, they were unsupported both on the right and on the left. Nothing could be seen of the neighboring brigade on the left; nothing could be seen, nor could a hasty reconnaissance patrol find any indication of the connecting regiment of the division on our right. By my direction, Captain Portmann hastily scraped together a few stragglers of the 9th and 23rd infantries and other organizations, and quickly forming them into a compact effective body some fifty men strong, went forward as a combat liaison group on the right of the third battalion which formed the first echelon protecting the flank of this battalion and joined in the assault and reaching of the fifth objective. He is in every way worthy of promotion and his recommendation to a higher grade has twice before this been suggested by me.

— James H. Reeves, Colonel, Commanding

Portmann was reinstated on September 18, 1918. For his gallantry in action during the Battle of St. Mihiel, Portmann was cited by Commanding General John J. Pershing on June 3, 1919, for his actions.

Distinguished Service Citation

(Upgraded by US Army to Silver Star)

By direction of the President, under the provisions of the act of Congress approved July 9, 1918 (Cit. Or. No. 4, A.E.F., 1918), Captain (Infantry) Milton Portmann, United States Army, is cited by the Commanding General, American Expeditionary Forces, for gallantry in action and a silver star may be placed upon the ribbon of the Victory Medals awarded him, Captain (Infantry) Portmann distinguished himself by gallantry in action while serving with the 353rd Infantry, American Expeditionary Forces, in action during the St. Mihiel Offensive, France, 12–13 September 1918, and by his brilliant leadership.

On October 21, 1918 in the drive to Argonne, German artillery shelling increased in the Bois de Bantheville where Portmann commanding the 1st Battalion with the 353rd infantry regiment was located. Portmann received artillery shrapnel through his right thigh. Severely wounded, he was evacuated to Regimental base hospital. He spent the next five months in various hospitals. He was moved by ambulance train and arrived in Hyeres Base Hospital #99 by direction of his brother Ursus, where as a United States Army physician was stationed. As Portmann was infirmed, he had learned that he received a battlefield promotion to Major. May 4, 1919, French General Fénelon François Germain Passaga of the 32nd Army Corps (France)., Commandment de Mange of the French General Staff along with Major General Frank L. Winn, the divisional commander, presented the colors of the 353rd Infantry Regiment with the Croix de Guerre for their service in St. Mihiel. He was home in May 1919 with an open wound still in his leg.

== Military awards ==

Silver Star Medal
Purple Heart Medal with (1) Oak Leaf Cluster	World War I Victory Medal Four bronze service stars: France, St. Mihiel, Meuse-Argonne, and Defensive Sector	Order of Leopold (Belgium)

== Later life and death ==
After his return from World War I, Portmann resumed his legal career in Cleveland, where he was a partner in the firm of Townes & Portmann. Local political leaders encouraged him to enter public service, including a proposed candidacy for mayor of Cleveland shortly after his overseas service, though he did not ultimately pursue elected office. The law firm of Townes & Portmann grew to Townes, Krueger, Portmann, and Belton in 1921. In August 1919, Portmann was among the founders of Cleveland’s Army and Navy American Legion Post 54, reflecting his involvement in veterans' affairs. He married Dorothy Clampitt in 1923. They had three children together, and both sons were World War II veterans. He practiced law with his son Richard in the firm Portmann & Portmann until his death from leukemia on August 14, 1967, at the Cleveland Clinic in Cleveland, Ohio.

A cenotaph honoring his military service is located at Arlington National Cemetery.

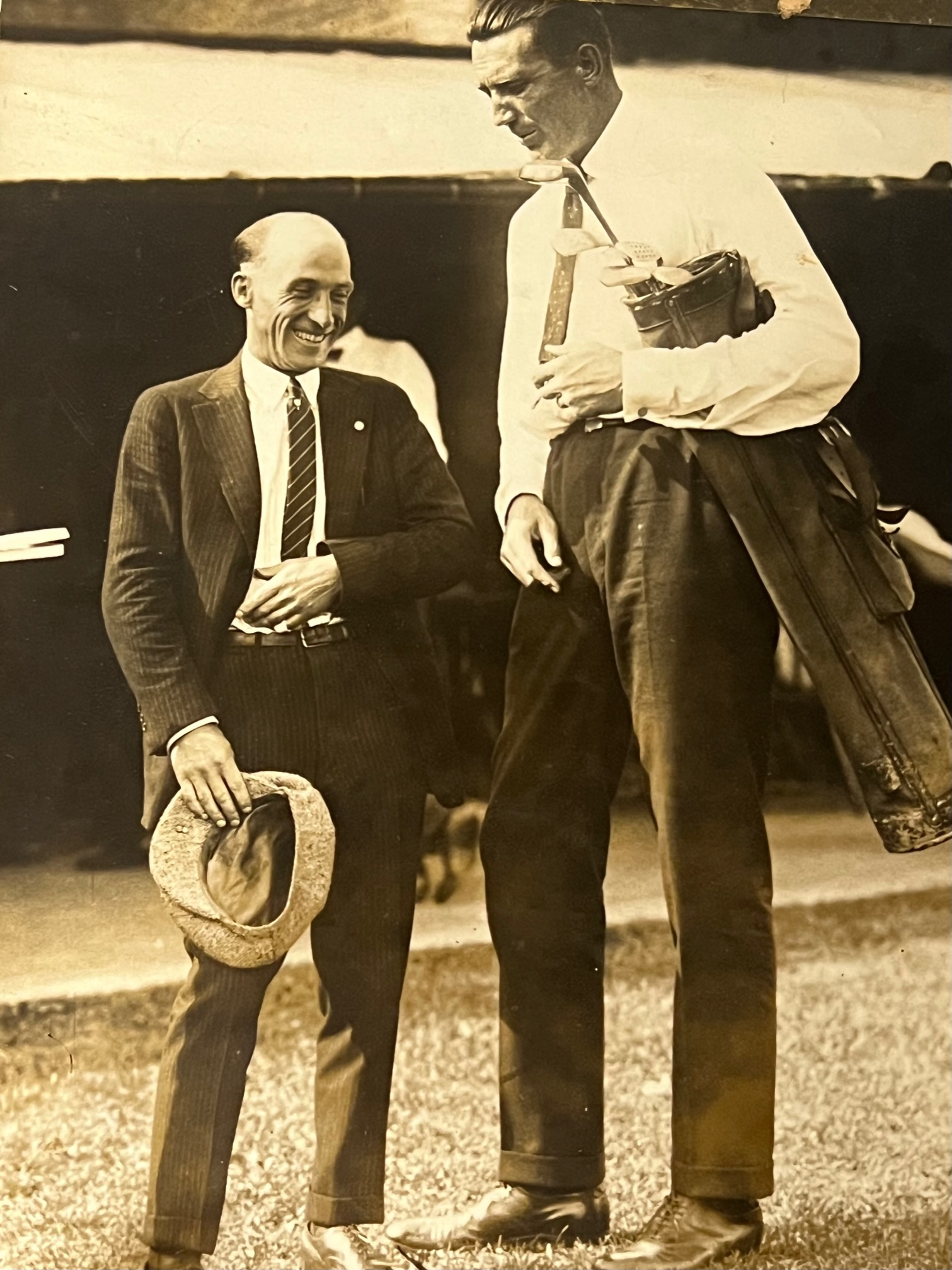
Milton Portmann at Westwood Country Club in Rocky River, Ohio

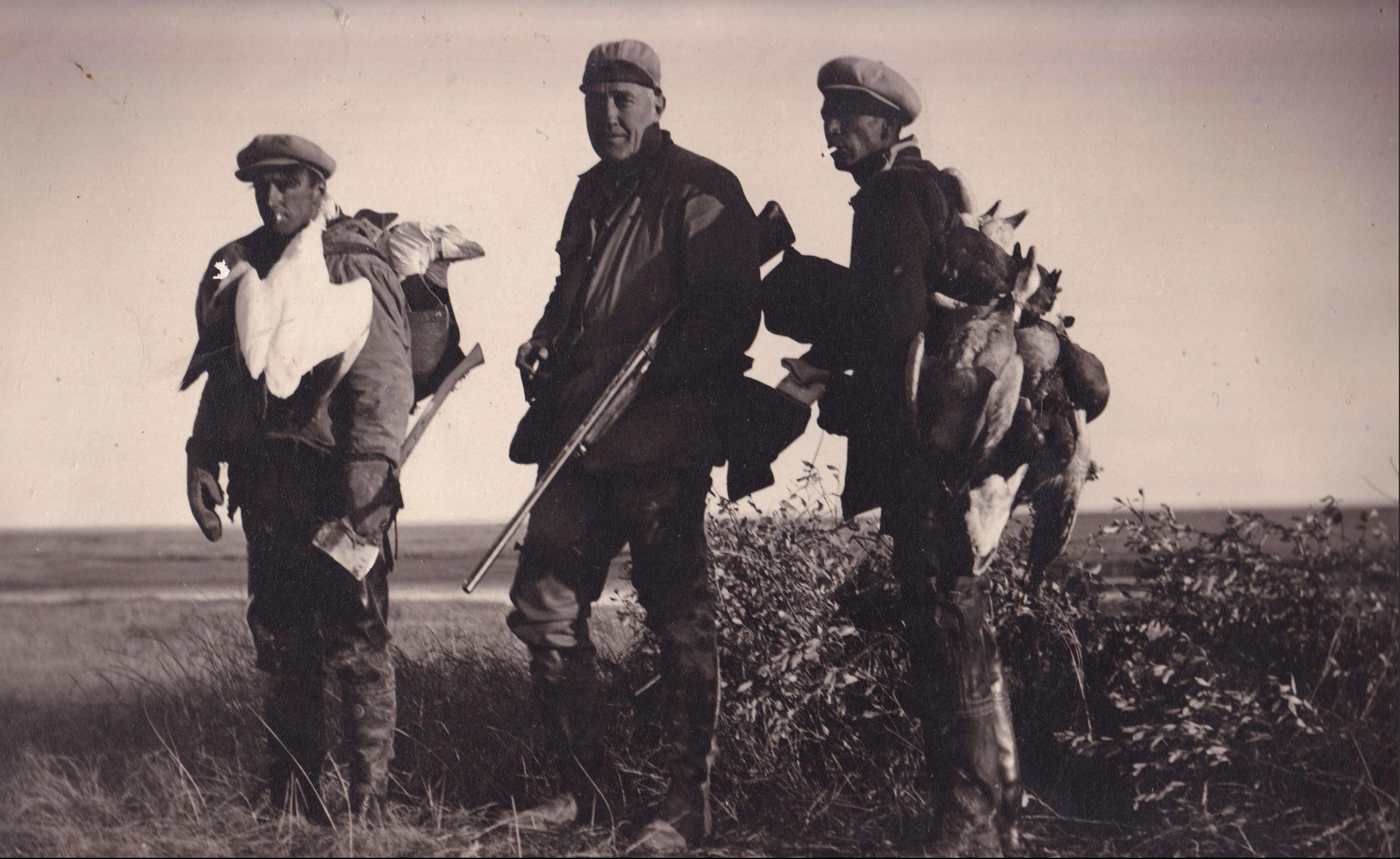
Milton Portmann goose hunting.

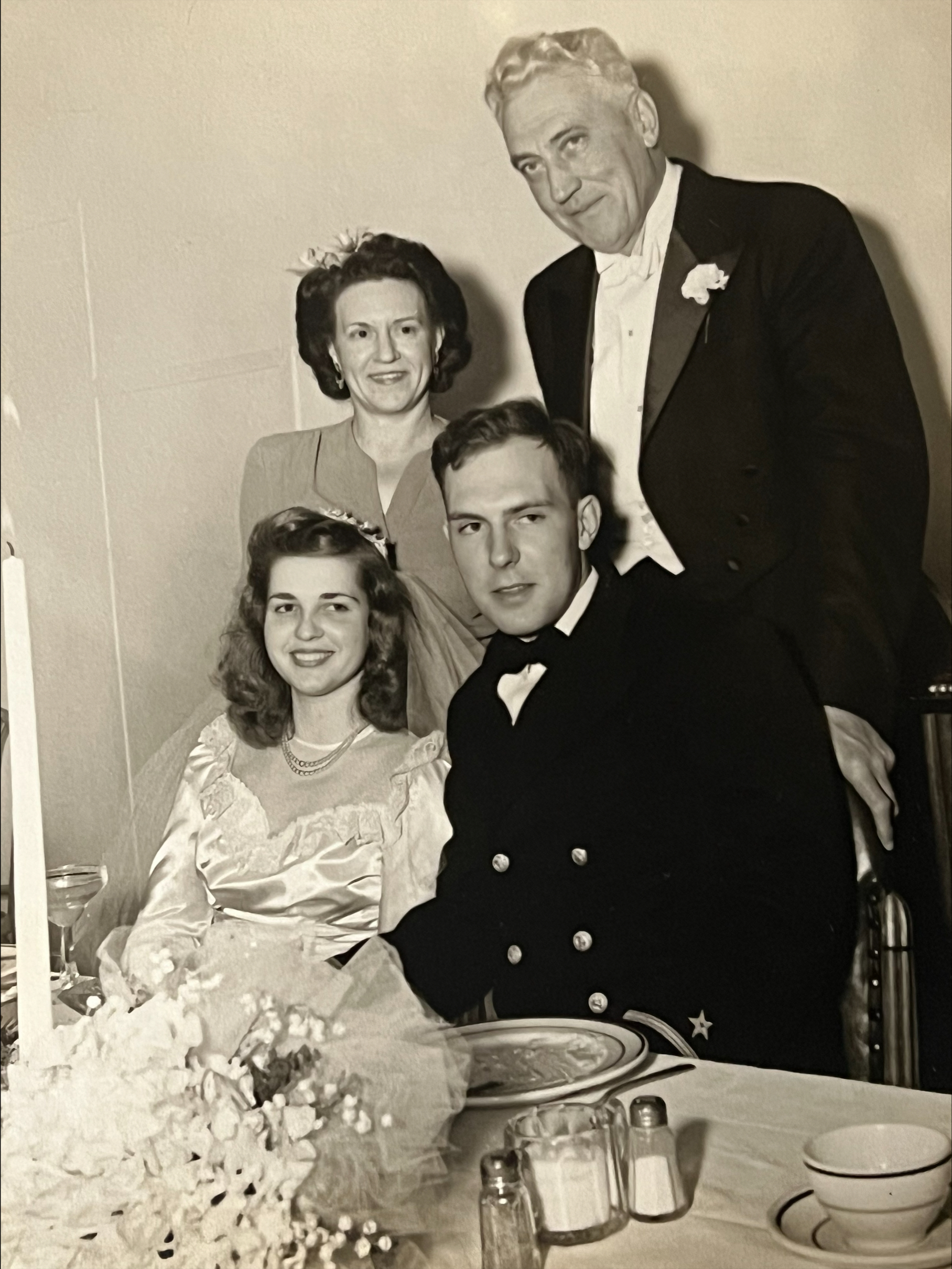
Milton and Dorothy Portmann (top) at oldest son's (seated) wedding, 1945

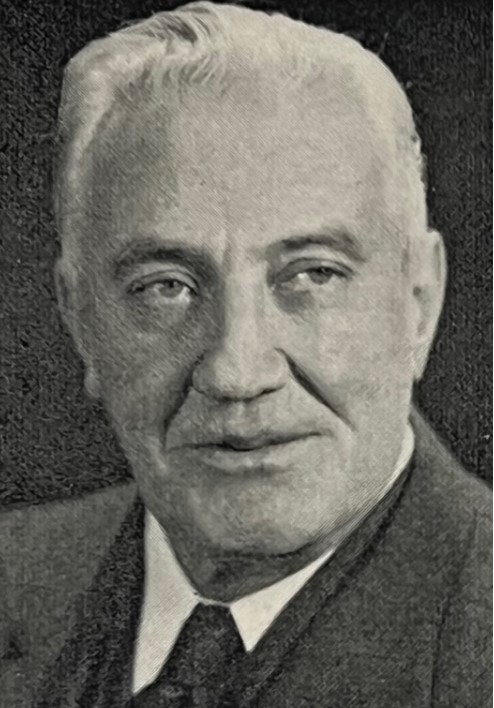
Milton Portmann October 1962 photograph from Army Navy Post 54 The Bugle
