= 1908 Western Reserve football team =

American college football season

1908 Western Reserve football
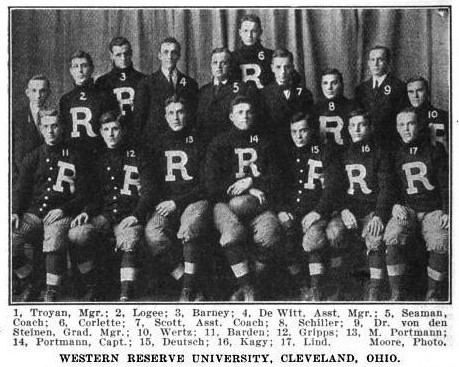
- The image includes players Ed Kagy, Del Wertz, Milton "Muff" Portmann, and Ursus "Doc" Portmann

OAC champion
- Conference: Ohio Athletic Conference
- Record: 9–1 (6–1 OAC)
- Head coach: William B. Seaman (3rd season)
- Captain: Ursus “Doc” Portmann

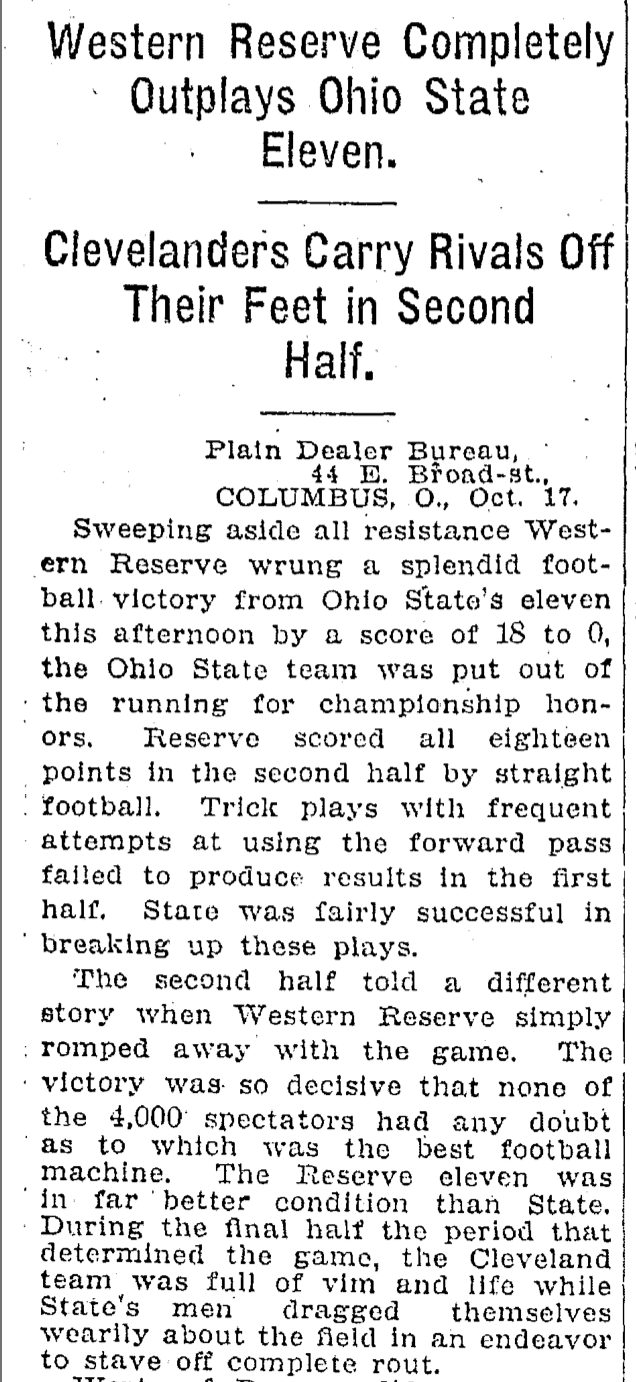
Plain Dealer article describing the Western Reserve-Ohio State football game the next day on October 18, 1908

1908 Ohio Athletic Conference football standings
	Conf.					Overall
Team	W		L		T	W		L		T
Western Reserve $	6	–	1	–	0	9	–	1	–	0
Kenyon	3	–	1	–	1	7	–	1	–	1
Ohio State	4	–	3	–	0	6	–	4	–	0
Case	4	–	2	–	1	6	–	3	–	1
Oberlin	2	–	2	–	0	3	–	4	–	0
Denison	2	–	3	–	0	5	–	5	–	0
Ohio Wesleyan	2	–	3	–	0	4	–	4	–	0
Wooster	1	–	5	–	0	3	–	5	–	0
Heidelberg	0	–	4	–	0	1	–	6	–	0
$ – Conference champion

The 1908 Western Reserve football team represented Western Reserve University of Cleveland, Ohio, now known as Case Western Reserve University, during the 1908 college football season. The team's coach was William B. Seaman . Assistant coach was Xen C. Scott.

== Schedule ==
Date	Opponent	Site	Result	Attendance	Source
September 26	Baldwin–Wallace*	Van Horn Field; Cleveland, OH	W 29–0		
October 3	at Washington & Jefferson*	Washington, PA	W 11–0		
October 10	at Wooster	Wooster, OH	W 16–4		
October 17	at Ohio State	Ohio Field; Columbus, OH	W 18–0	4,000	
October 24	Kenyon	Van Horn Field; Cleveland, OH	L 0–4		
October 31	at Hiram*	Hiram, OH	W 30–0		
November 7	at Oberlin	Oberlin, OH	W 12–5		
November 14	Denison	Van Horn Field; Cleveland, OH	W 11–0		
November 21	Heidelberg	Van Horn Field; Cleveland, OH	W 54–0		
November 26	at Case	Van Horn Field; Cleveland, OH	W 11–7		
*Non-conference game
