= Howe Welch =

American football player

Howard A. "Howe" Welch was a professional football player for the Akron Indians. Around 1916, the Indians were briefly referred to as the Burkhardts, a semi-pro team was organized by Suey around his brothers Howe and Chang, and Carl Cardarelli. After three seasons, Welch performed for and/or coached the Suey Welch-backed and managed Akron Indians playing against many of professional football's early stars including Al Nesser, Ralph Waldsmith and Fred Sefton.
