= Suey Welch =

American manager (born 1898)

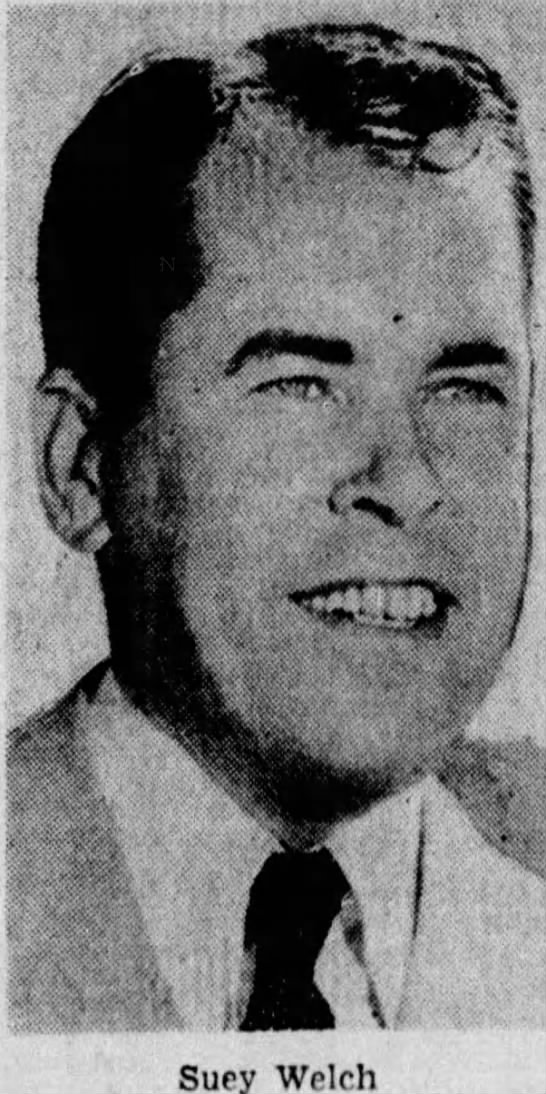

Profile
- Position: Head coach

Personal information
- Born: c.1898 Akron, Ohio, U.S.
- Died: January 16, 1974; Long Beach, California, U.S.

Career information
- College: None

Career history

Playing
- 1916–1918: Akron Burkhardts

Coaching
- 1917–1918: Akron Burkhardts

Awards and highlights
- World Boxing Hall of Fame

Stephen H. "Suey" Welch (born 1898 or 1899 – January 16, 1974) was an Akron, Ohio-based manager who handled boxers from the 1920s through the 1970s. He specialized in bringing fighters from Ohio to Southern California, where many of them went on to become main event fighters. Most notably, he managed Middleweight Champion Gorilla Jones. One of the last fighters he brought to Southern California in the 1970s was Gil King of Akron. He purportedly got his name of Suey, while catching rides on a Chinese laundryman's truck as a child.

== Work at the Olympic Auditorium ==
Welch was named the matchmaker at the Olympic Auditorium on March 16, 1937, after previous matchmaker Joe Waterman was fired (Waterman's claim) or resigned (Olympic's claim) from his position. Welch made his debut on March 23, 1937, with a main event between Baby Arizmendi and Wally Hally. In January 1938, Welch was made the supervisor of all of Olympic manager Harry Popkin's boxing operations in Los Angeles and San Francisco. Waterman was then reinstated as matchmaker at the Olympic, though Welch would still assist him in making matches. Welch left his position at the Olympic in April 1939, amidst allegations that Lou and Jack Daro managers of the Olympic and powerful figures in the wrestling game, were paying sportswriters and local politicians. Welch was subsequently cited for tax evasion by the State of California in 1937 and 1938, during which time he was paid $19,000, while claiming a salary of $100 per week. The state also invested claims of fixed boxing matches, which included the Chuck Crowell and Al (Big Boy) Bray bout.

== Akron Indians ==
For a few years, Suey played alongside his brothers Chang and Howe for the Akron Indians of the "Ohio League" from around 1916 until 1918. The Indians were reestablished in 1916 and temporarily called the Akron Burkhardts, after a local brewer. In 1921, Welch bought the "Akron Indians" name and fielded his own independent team.

Welch, a bachelor, died January 16, 1974, in Long Beach, California, after a series of heart attacks. He was later inducted into the World Boxing Hall of Fame.

== Stable ==
Other boxers in his stable included:

- Andy Bundy (1934, while in Los Angeles}
- K.O. Christner
- Charley (Killer) Coates
- Art Hafey
- Hank Hankinson
- Tommy Hart
- Gus Lesnevich (1936, while boxing in Los Angeles)
- Al Manfredo (1935–37)
- Emilio Martinez (1936, after drawing with John Henry Lewis)
- Sammy O'Dell
- Billy Peacock
- Charley Powell
