= Earl Cramer =

American football player (1896–1962)

No. 2, 1, 9
- Positions: Fullback, halfback, quarterback

Personal information
- Born: December 2, 1896; Verona Township, Faribault County, Minnesota, U.S.
- Died: June 1, 1962 (aged 65); Glendale, California, U.S.
- Listed height: 5 ft 11 in (1.80 m)
- Listed weight: 184 lb (83 kg)

Career information
- High school: Winnebago (Winnebago, Minnesota)
- College: Hamline (1915–1916, 1919)

Career history

Playing
- Cleveland Tigers (1920); Akron Pros / Indians (1921–1926)

Coaching
- Akron Pros (1923) Player-coach
- Stats at Pro Football Reference

Earl Edward Cramer (December 2, 1896 – June 1, 1962) was a professional football player who played as a fullback, halfback and quarterback in the National Football League (NFL). He played college football for the Hamline Pipers.

== College career ==
Cramer was educated at Hamline University in Saint Paul, Minnesota. He played two seasons with the Pipers, before the program was suspended due to the United States' involvement in World War I. Cramer subsequently joined the United States Army, where he served in the United States Army Ambulance Service (USAAS), and played on the unit's football team. He returned to college football to play in the 1919 season.

== Professional career ==
Cramer spent his entire professional career in the state of Ohio. In 1920, he joined the Cleveland Tigers of the American Professional Football Association (later renamed the National Football League). The following year, he joined the Akron Pros (which reverted to its former name, the Akron Indians, in 1926). Cramer is the franchise's all-time leading scorer.

In 1922, Cramer began a coaching career with the Pros, serving as an assistant coach. In 1923, he served as a player-coach for the Pros. He split coaching duties that season with Dutch Hendrian, which ended when Hendrian left the team to join the Canton Bulldogs.

Cramer's NFL.com and Pro Football Reference profiles list him as "Carl Cramer", indicating that he might have played under that name professionally. This presumably derives from his college nickname, "Curley".
