= Del Wertz =

American baseball player (1888–1958)

Profile
- Position: Halfback

Personal information
- Born: October 11, 1888; Canton, Ohio, U.S.
- Died: May 26, 1958 (aged 69); Sarasota, Florida, U.S.

Career information
- College: Western Reserve

Career history
- 1912: Shelby Blues
- 1912: Elyria Athletics
- 1913: Akron Indians
- 1914: Youngstown Pros
- 1914: Akron Indians

Awards and highlights
- 1912 Ohio League Champs; 1913 Ohio League Champs; 1914 Ohio League Champs

Del Wertz
- Shortstop
- Batted: Right Threw: Right

MLB debut
- May 23, 1914, for the Buffalo Buffeds

Last MLB appearance
- May 26, 1914, for the Buffalo Buffeds

MLB statistics
- Batting average: --
- Home runs: 0
- RBI: 0
- Stats at Baseball Reference

Teams
- Buffalo Buffeds (1914)

Dwight Lyman Moody "Del" Wertz (October 11, 1888 – May 26, 1958) was a right-handed baseball shortstop for the Buffalo Buffeds of the Federal League in 1914 and a professional football player in the Ohio League.

== Early life ==
Dwight "Del" Wertz was born in Canton, Ohio on October 11, 1888. He was the son of Anna Elizabeth (née Smith) and Henry Wertz. He had three brothers, DeWitt Milton, Arthur Dubbs, and Thorold Jay, and sister Florence Catheryn. He attended Western Reserve University, now known as Case Western Reserve University. Del married Gwendolyn Thompson on January 27, 1917 in St. Joseph County, Indiana. They had three daughters: Elizabeth Jane, Roxana Ruth, and Nila Catherine.

== Baseball career ==
Del spent three games with the Buffalo Buffeds, getting no at-bats. However, he did score a run, indicating that he was a pinch runner in at least one of the games in which he appeared. He played in one game in the field, making one putout at shortstop. He appeared in his final game on May 26, 1914, exactly 44 years before his death in 1958.

== Football career ==
Wertz was better known for his professional football career in the Ohio League, the direct predecessor to the modern National Football League. During his three seasons in the Ohio League, Wertz played for the Shelby Blues, Elyria Athletics, Akron Indians and Youngstown Pros. He earned league titles in 1914 with Elyria and with Akron in 1913 and 1914.

== Later life ==
Wertz died on May 26, 1958, in Sarasota, Florida. He was interred at Highland Cemetery in South Bend, Indiana.
