= Ed Kagy =

American football player (1889–1960)

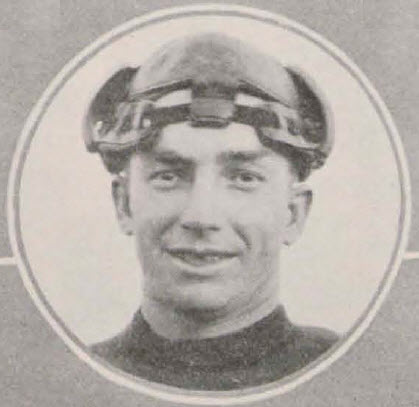
- Kagy while playing for Camp Sherman in 1917

Profile
- Position: Halfback

Personal information
- Born: April 21, 1889; Cleveland Heights, Ohio, U.S.
- Died: November 16, 1960 (aged 71); Cleveland, Ohio, U.S.

Career information
- College: Western Reserve

Career history
- 1912: Shelby Blues
- 1912: Elyria Athletics
- 1913–1914: Akron Indians
- 1915: Massillon Tigers
- 1917: Camp Sherman

Awards and highlights
- 3× Ohio League Champs (1912, 1913, 1914)

Edmund Leroy Kagy (April 21, 1889 – November 16, 1960) was an American professional football player in the Ohio League, which was the direct predecessor to the modern National Football League (NFL), from 1912 until 1915. During that time he played with the Shelby Blues, Elyria Athletics, Akron Indians and the Massillon Tigers. He won championships with Elyria, in 1914, and Akron in 1913 and 1914.

Prior to his professional career, Kagy played college level at Western Reserve, now known as Case Western Reserve University, from 1908 to 1910. In 1917 he played for the Camp Sherman Football Team. He played for the team on November 29, 1917, in a 28–0 loss to the Ohio State Buckeyes. On April 18, 1980, Kagy was inducted into Case's varsity sports hall of fame. Kagy coached Western Reserve's basketball team for two seasons spanning from 1911 to 1913, and Western Reserve's baseball team during the 1912 season. Kagy was also an assistant football coach in 1911.

In 1912, Kagy co-founded Gyro International, where he remained involved until he retired in 1953. He was enduringly known within the organization as the "Grey Eagle.” He resided in Chagrin Falls, OH much of his adult life.
