= Gyro International =

Social, service, and fraternal organization

Gyro International is a non-profit social, service, and fraternal club for men located in the United States, Canada and Japan. Gyro was founded by Paul Schwan, Clarence (Gus) Handerson, and Edmund (Ed) Kagy, three college friends, in April 1912 in Cleveland, Ohio. The primary purpose of the club is the promotion of fun and friendship amongst men of all nations.

The first formal meeting was held on June 24, 1912, during which a constitution was presented and accepted, even though the club had no official name at the time. On January 7, 1913 the name Gyro (suggested by new member Jimmie Hubbell) was adopted. It was drawn from the word gyroscope, symbolizing the ability to maintain a desired course and attitude regardless of outside influences.

== Playground movement ==
In Canada during the first half the twentieth century, Gyro clubs were notable patrons of playgrounds, along with other service clubs like the Kinsmen and the Kiwanis.

Gyro parks are found in the Province of Alberta in the cities of Calgary, Edmonton, and Lethbridge. In the Province of British Columbia Gyro Parks are in the cities of Trail, Saanich (Cadboro Bay), Penticton, Osoyoos, Grand Forks, Nanaimo, Victoria, Port Alberni, Prince George, Nelson, and Kelowna.

The International Association of Gyro Clubs convention in Winnipeg from June 21 to 25, 1926 at the Royal Alexandra Hotel in Winnipeg was claimed to be the largest international service club gathering held in Canada.

The Nanaimo club is still very active with parks and continues to donate money and manpower to build and maintain parks.

== See also ==
- National Playing Fields Association, established 1925, patron of playgrounds in the United Kingdom
