= Ralph Waldsmith =

American football player (1892–1925)

No. 10 (1922)
- Positions: Guard, Center

Personal information
- Born: August 7, 1892; Akron, Ohio, U.S.
- Died: June 7, 1925 (aged 32)
- Listed height: 5 ft 9 in (1.75 m)
- Listed weight: 225 lb (102 kg)

Career information
- College: Akron

Career history

Playing
- 1914: Akron Indians
- 1916–1917: Canton Bulldogs
- 1919: Akron Indians
- 1921: Cleveland Indians
- 1922: Canton Bulldogs

Coaching
- 1916, 1919: Akron Indians

owner
- 1919: Akron Indians

Awards and highlights
- NFL champion (1922); 3× Ohio League champion (1914, 1916, 1917); Signed Fritz Pollard to the Akron Indians (1919); Varsity “A” Sports Hall of Fame (1978)

Ralph George "Fat" Waldsmith (August 7, 1892 – June 7, 1925) was a professional football player during the early years of the National Football League (NFL). Waldsmith won an NFL championship with the Canton Bulldogs in 1922. before that season, he played for the Cleveland Indians in the American Professional Football Association, which was the run-up to the NFL.

== Pre-NFL era ==
Prior to playing the NFL, Waldsmith played in the Ohio League with the Akron Indians in 1914, alongside Knute Rockne. He played in every game that season. In 1916 and 1917, Ralph won the Ohio League championship with the Canton Bulldogs. In 1919 Waldsmith was the coach and co-owner of the Akron Indians. That year, he signed Fritz Pollard to play for Akron ao that the team could compete against the Massillon Tigers and Canton.

== Akron Zips Hall of Fame ==
In 1978, Waldsmith was inducted into the University of Akron's Varsity “A” Sports Hall of Fame.
