= Charles Follis =

American baseball and football player (1879–1910)

Profile
- Position: Halfback

Personal information
- Born: February 3, 1879; Cloverdale, Virginia
- Died: April 15, 1910 (aged 31); Cleveland, Ohio
- Listed height: 6 ft 0 in (1.83 m)
- Listed weight: 200 lb (91 kg)

Career information
- High school: Wooster (Wooster, Ohio)
- College: Wooster

Career history
- Wooster Athletic Association (1901); Shelby Blues (1902–1906)

Awards and highlights
- First black professional football player

Charles W. Follis, also known as "the Black Cyclone", (February 3, 1879 – April 5, 1910) was the first Black professional American football player. He played for the Shelby Blues of the "Ohio League" from 1902 to 1906. On September 16, 1904, Follis signed a contract with the Blues, making him the first Black man contracted to play professional football on an integrated team. He was also the first Black catcher to move from college baseball into the Negro leagues.

== Biography ==
Charles W. Follis was born on February 3, 1879, to James Henry and Catherine Matilda Anderson Follis in Cloverdale, Virginia. James Henry (b. 1846– d. 1910) and Catherine Matilda (b. 1848 – d.1922) were married in Virginia in 1873. Charles W. Follis' father was a farm laborer.

Charles was probably the third born of seven children. The older siblings were Lelia M. (b. 1874) and Cora Belle (b. 1876). Sister Laura Alice was born in 1880 and brother Curtis W. was born in 1884 and died in 1903. In 1885, the family moved to Wooster, Ohio, where Walter Joseph (b. 1888) and Lucy Jane (b. 1890) were born.

=== Football career ===
Follis entered Wooster College, in 1901, however, he chose to play football for the amateur Wooster Athletic Association, rather than the college squad. As a member of the Wooster Athletic Association, he would earn the nickname, "Charles The Speedy." At the end of the 1901 season, Wooster played the Shelby Blues in a two-game series. Follis' performance brought him to the attention of the Shelby team manager, Frank C. Schiffer, who decided he wanted Follis to play with his team, not against them. He secured Follis for his team and set him up with a job at a local hardware store. Charles' working hours were arranged so that he could both practice and play football.

During the 1902 and 1903 seasons, Follis played for Shelby. During a 58–0 win over a team from Fremont, Follis ran for a 60-yard touchdown. In 1904, he helped lead the Blues to an 8–1–1 record. Their only loss was to the Massillon Tigers, the 1904 Ohio League champions. In 1906, the Blues became an entirely open professional team. Charles missed the early part of the season due to an injury, however, he did return in the second half of the season. Finally, on Thanksgiving Day 1906, while playing against the Franklin Athletic Club of Cleveland, he suffered another injury, though this one ended his career. He earned many trophies during his college football career.

=== Baseball ===
Follis was also the first Black catcher to move from college baseball into the Negro leagues. During the 1901 and 1902 seasons, while playing for Wooster University, Follis became well known in the Ohio college circuit. His closest competitor at the position, was Branch Rickey of nearby Ohio Wesleyan University.

In 1902, he left Wooster University and by 1909 he was catching for the Cuban Giants. He became the Giants' star catcher, their leading slugger and their most popular player. Follis was credited with many stolen bases, double plays, and even two triple plays in his career. However, he had a better reputation as a power hitter. On May 16, 1906, Buttons Briggs, a pitcher formerly of the National League's Chicago Cubs, was brought in by Elyria to pitch against the Wooster Giants. This moved was intended to intimate Wooster, since Briggs won 20 games in 1905. However Follis as the lead-off batter in the first inning, first ball hit a home run off the former major league star's first pitch. He completed the day with four-for-six against Buttons.

=== Death ===
Follis developed pneumonia after playing a game with the Giants and died in Cleveland on April 5, 1910, at age 31. He is buried in Wooster Cemetery in Wooster.

== Legacy ==
=== First black professional football player ===
While Follis' professionalism was reported by the local press, his role as the first Black professional football player was not known by sports historians until many years later. In 1975, researchers rediscovered halfback Follis' on-the-field-achievements while reviewing old pages of the Shelby Daily Globe, with the goal to locate evidence that Follis had played as a professional. After hours of examining the tattered newspapers, researchers finally came across an article in the September 16, 1904 edition that announced Follis had signed a contract for the upcoming season.

=== Branch Rickey ===
One of Follis' Shelby teammates during the 1902 and 1903 seasons was Branch Rickey. Rickey would later become the general manager of baseball's Brooklyn Dodgers and Pittsburgh Pirates. He was often hired to play for Shelby while attending nearby Ohio Wesleyan University. Rickey also played against Follis on October 17, 1903, when he ran for a 70-yard touchdown against the Ohio Wesleyan football team. It is highly probable that Rickey's first-hand observation of Follis influenced his decision to sign Jackie Robinson to a Major League Baseball contract in 1947, breaking baseball's color barrier.

=== Honorific namings ===
In 1998, the football field/outdoor track facility at Wooster High School, Follis Field, was dedicated in his honor.

The town of Shelby, Ohio named a street after Follis in September 2020.

=== Hall of Fame ===
In 2013, Follis was inducted into the College of Wooster Hall of Fame. However, despite his impact on American sports he still has yet to be inducted into or even honored by the Pro Football Hall of Fame.

== See also ==
- Bud Fowler – the first Black professional baseball player
