= Coleman Athletic Club =

1913 American football team

General information
- Founded: 1913
- Folded: 1913
- Headquartered: Akron, Ohio, United States
- Colors: Unknown

Personnel
- General manager: C.P. Parker

Team history
- Coleman Athletic Club (1913)

League / conference affiliations
- Ohio League (1913)

The Coleman Athletic Club of Akron was a professional American football team based in Akron, Ohio, in 1913. The team played in the Ohio League and was formed when C.P. Parker, secretary of the baseball's Akron Giants, of the Interstate League, formed a new Akron-based football team to compete with Peggy Parratt and his Indians. Parker first convinced a few of Parratt's regulars to sign with his club. He then loaded the rest of roster with ex-players from the Elyria Athletics, which had just folded a week prior.

Unlike many of the Athletic Club teams of the early 1900s, there was no actual "Coleman Athletic Club" in existence. Instead the name was given to the team, since it played all home games at Akron's Coleman Athletic Field. In Akron, they were sometimes called Coleman's Akron Indians as opposed to Parrett's Akron Indians.

Coleman opened its season against the Canton Professionals (renamed the Canton Bulldogs in 1915). Coleman defeated Canton 26–0, by scoring two touchdowns on recovered fumbles and another on a pass interception. Coleman's halfback, Tony Wein, scored the only offensive touchdown on a goal line plunge. However, two weeks later, Canton defeated Coleman 7–6 as the result of a controversial call by the referee, named "Schleininger", who claimed that Coleman's Homer Davidson missed a 28-yard field goal that would have given Coleman a 9–6 victory. Davidson disagreed violently with the referee, who just happened to be a Canton resident. However, the earlier loss to Coleman removed Canton from any chance of winning the Ohio League title.

The Akron Indians would go on to win the 1913 Ohio League title. However, they did not have an undisputed claim to the Akron City Championship, because they did not play the Coleman Athletic Club. To remedy the situation, Akron's Peggy Parratt scheduled a game between Coleman and the Indians. Coleman then lost to Parratt and the Indians, 30–0.
