= Shelby Tigers =

General information
- Founded: 1910
- Folded: 1911 (merged with Shelby Blues)
- Headquartered: Shelby, Ohio, United States
- Colors: Black, Orange

Personnel
- General manager: Frank Schiffer
- Head coach: Homer Davidson

Team history
- Shelby Tigers (1910–1911); Shelby Blues (1911–1919)

League / conference affiliations
- Ohio League (1910–1911)

Championships
- League championships: 1 Ohio League championship (1910)

The Shelby Tigers was a professional American football team, based in Shelby, Ohio, from 1910 until 1911. The team played in the Ohio League, which was the direct predecessor to the modern National Football League.

== 1910 season ==
The team was established and managed by Frank Schiffer, a former executive of the Shelby Athletic Club when the team first started paying players, including the first African-American professional football player, Charles Follis. The coach and quarterback of the 1910 Tigers team was Homer Davidson, a star player for the cross-town, Shelby Blues. Meanwhile Bullet Riley, who caught the first legal forward pass from Peggy Parratt while playing for the Massillon Tigers in 1906, signed with the team in 1910.

The Tigers marched to an undefeated season in 1910. The team then signed a contract to play the Akron Indians on Thanksgiving Day. However Akron needed to play the Shelby Blues again after losing to the team the week before. The rematch was needed to decide the championship of the Ohio League. Indians were forced to cancel their game with the Tigers and forfeited their $100 guarantee. The Blues would defeat Akron 8–5 and claim the title.

=== Ohio League champions? ===
The Blue and Tigers both laid claim to the 1910 Ohio League title. The Blues were unbeaten with one tie and had those two big victories over the Akron Indians. Meanwhile the Tigers were unbeaten, untied, and unscored upon. The Blues played a harder schedule, but the Tigers won more convincingly. Frank Schiffer challenged the Blues to winner-take-all game for the title and suggested that the entire gate and $500 go to the winner. However having a championship game between the Tigers and Blues was impossible since too many players had seen action for both teams in 1910. Any game between the Blues and Tigers would force several players to choose sides, while the outcome of the game would depend simply on how their loyalties divvied up.

It was later determined that since both teams were from Shelby, they should simply share the championship. The players for the Blues and Tigers were so intertwined that it was very hard to determine who was a Tiger and who was a Blues player. Both teams combined for a 13–0–1 record.

== 1911 (the merge) ==
In 1911, the Shelby Blues and Shelby Tigers merged, taking the "Blues" name. A second "Shelby Tigers" team began play that season and continued as a semi-professional team into 1912.

Achievements
Preceded by Akron Indians; 1908–1909	Ohio League Champions; Shelby Tigers & Shelby Blues; 1910	Succeeded by Shelby Blues; 1911
