= McKeesport Olympics =

Football team from Pennsylvania, US

General information
- Founded: 1896; 130 years ago
- Folded: c.1940
- Headquartered: McKeesport, Pennsylvania, United States
- Colors: Unknown

Personnel
- Owner: McKeesport Athletic Club

Team history
- McKeesport Olympics (1896-c1940)

League / conference affiliations
- Western Pennsylvania Circuit

The McKeesport Olympics were a professional football team from McKeesport, Pennsylvania from 1896 until around 1940. The Olympics were considered one of the top football teams in Pennsylvania from 1910 until 1919.

== History ==
The Olympics played against many of the teams that later formed the National Football League. These teams included the Buffalo All-Americans, Rochester Jeffersons and the Canton Bulldogs. The primary reason the Olympics never joined the NFL during the early era was the state of Pennsylvania's blue laws which prevented football from being played on Sunday; as a result, no Pennsylvania team joined the NFL (which played most of its games on Sundays) until 1924, though because most teams were available to play on Saturdays, they were able to schedule exhibition games against NFL teams fairly easily. Why the Olympics never joined after that was unclear. In 1929, the Olympics were crowned as Sandlot Grid Champs with Art Rooneys team, Rooneys Majestics, placing second.

The team also played against a current NFL team, the Pittsburgh Pirates (renamed the Pittsburgh Steelers in 1940) twice. The first game between the two clubs was held on October 31, 1938. The Pirates, led by Byron White, won that game 21-6. However, almost a year later, on October 4, 1939, in McKeesport, while the Pirates won that game too, the semi-pro Olympics held them to a much closer score, 9-6.

The Olympics also played against several strong clubs that never made it into the NFL. These teams included the Youngstown Patricians and the Shelby Blues. However, the Olympics main rivals were the Pitcairn Quakers, another strong team from the Pittsburgh-area. In 1919 the Olympics had won the first game of the two-game series, 3-0 and had employed the entire Cleveland Indians team just for that game. However, Pitcairn would win the second game due to a last minute field goal by Paul Rupp.

The team disappears from the records shortly after the 1939 contests and likely shut down, as many professional football teams and leagues did, due to World War II.
