= Dutch Hendrian =

American football player and actor (1896–1953)

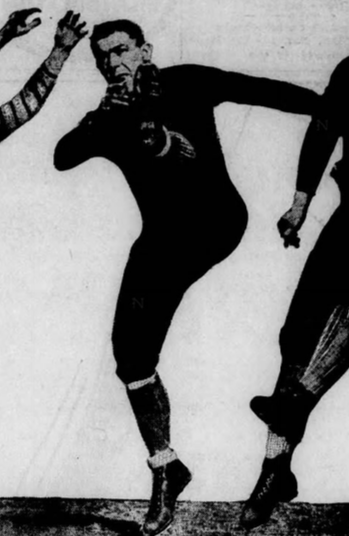

Profile
- Position: Running back

Personal information
- Born: January 19, 1896; Detroit, Michigan, U.S.
- Died: December 13, 1953 (aged 57); Los Angeles County, California, U.S.

Career information
- College: Pittsburgh (freshman football); Princeton

Career history

Playing
- 1923: Akron Pros
- 1923: Canton Bulldogs
- 1924: Green Bay Packers
- 1925: New York Giants
- 1925: Rock Island Independents

Coaching
- 1923: Akron Pros
- Coaching profile at Pro Football Reference

Oscar George "Dutch" Hendrian (January 19, 1896 – December 13, 1953) was an American actor and former American football player in the National Football League (NFL).

== Career ==
=== Football ===
Hendrian first played college football at the University of Pittsburgh where he played on the school's freshman football team in 1919. He also played on the school's freshman baseball team and performed in the university's student theatrical Cap and Gown Club in the spring of 1920. Hendrian then transferred to Princeton University where he finished out his college football career. He started his professional career as a running back in the NFL with the Akron Pros in 1923. He then played for the Canton Bulldogs, the Green Bay Packers, the New York Giants, and the Rock Island Independents.

=== Acting ===
He made his debut in the movie The Happy Hottentots, playing Rosco. Many of his roles were uncredited, and he rarely had lines, usually playing extras. His two most notable movies were Son of Kong and The Most Dangerous Game. He retired from acting after his last movie, Belle of the Yukon, playing a miner. He died in Los Angeles, California on December 13, 1953.
