= Akron Pros =

Early era National Football League team in the US

General information
- Founded: 1908
- Folded: 1927
- Stadium: League Park
- Headquartered: Akron, Ohio, United States
- Colors: Blue, white

Personnel
- General manager: Art Ranney (1919–1927)
- Head coach: Peggy Parratt (1912–1915); Ralph Waldsmith (1916); Suey Welch (1917–1918); Ralph Waldsmith (1919); Elgie Tobin (1920–1921); Fritz Pollard (1921); Untz Brewer (1922); Earl Cramer & Dutch Hendrian (1923); Jim Flower (1924); George Barry (1925); Rube Ursella & Al Nesser (1926)

Team history
- Akron Indians (1908–1916); Akron Burkhardts (1916–1917); Akron Indians (1918–1919); Akron Pros (1920–1925); Akron Indians (1926)

League / conference affiliations
- Ohio League (1908–1919); National Football League (1920–1926)

The Akron Pros were a professional football team that played in Akron, Ohio from 1908 to 1926. The team originated in 1908 as a semi-pro team named the Akron Indians, but later became Akron Pros in 1920 as the team set out to become a charter member of the American Professional Football Association (later renamed the National Football League (NFL) in 1922). Fritz Pollard, the first black head coach in the NFL, co-coached the Akron Pros in 1921. Paul Robeson played for the team in 1921 as well. He was among the earliest stars of professional football before football became segregated from 1934 to 1946. In 1926, the name was changed back to the Akron Indians, after the earlier semi-pro team. Due to financial problems, the team suspended operations in 1927 and surrendered its franchise the following year.

== History ==
=== Origins ===
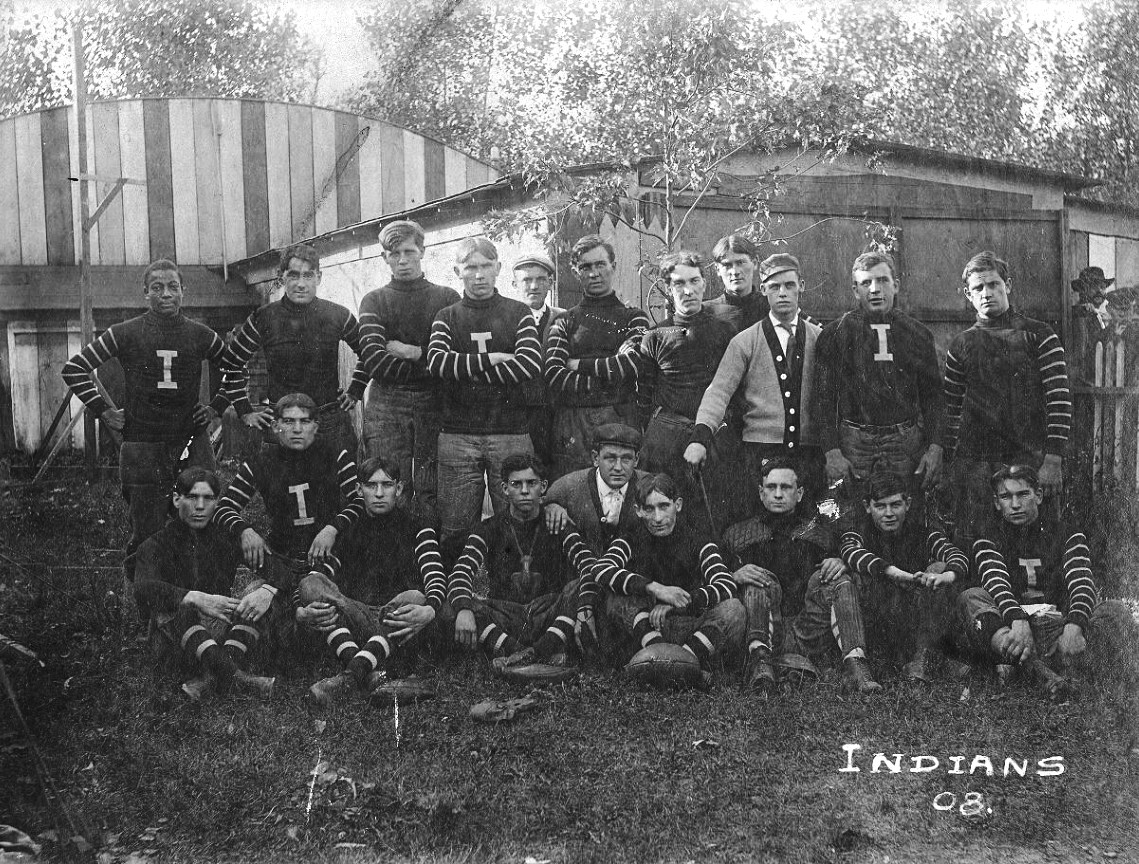
The 1908 Akron Indians.

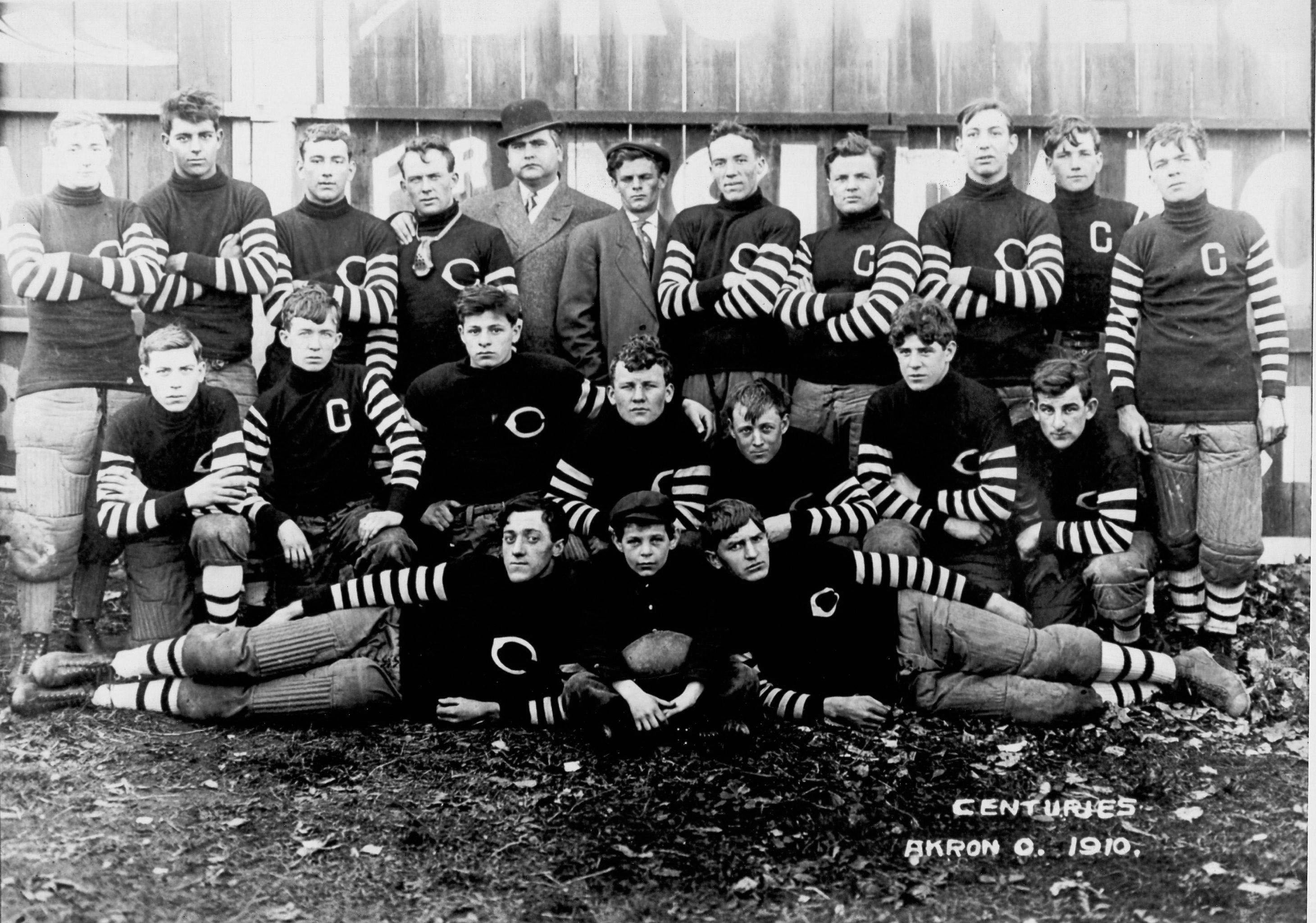
The Akron Pros in 1910.

Before 1908, several semi-pro and amateur teams dominated the Akron football scene. The most dominant of these was a team known as the Akron East Ends. The East Ends' dominance of Ohio football went unmatched until the Massillon Tigers paid several ringers from the recently disbanded Pittsburgh Stars to defeat the East Ends in 1903.

The Akron Indians date as far back as 1908. The early Indians teams went on to win Ohio League championships in 1908, 1909, 1913 and 1914. The team was always referred to as the Indians by the fans. From 1908 to 1913, the Indians had a reputation of playing more of a style of football seen at the college level than that of the early athletic clubs. For example, the Indians preferred passing the ball as opposed to running.

=== Parratt's Indians ===
Peggy Parratt.

Before the 1912 season, Peggy Parratt, an early football star with the Massillon Tigers, Franklin Athletic Club and the Shelby Blues, joined the Indians. He made the move after realizing that he could make more money in the large football market that Akron provided. When he arrived in Akron, his first move was to change the team name from the "Akron" Indians to "Parratt's Indians". With Peggy as a player, coach, and owner-manager, the Indians split their series with Shelby and twice defeated Canton, 14–7 and 19–7. However, they were defeated by the unheard-of Elyria Athletics, who then took the Ohio championship. The Athletics were mostly former Blues players who formed a team in Elyria after Parratt left for Akron.

The following season, Parratt brought most of Elyria's 1912 championship team to Akron and added them to his roster. The Indians then beat Shelby and Elyria. They also managed to tie the rapidly improving Canton Pros. During the Indians' championship game against Shelby, the Blues loaded their team with a collection of famous players from big eastern schools and supported each member with a payroll of $700 for just that one game. However, the game was canceled due to a snowstorm. A week later when the Blues returned to Akron, the Indians were prepared with newly recruited talent that was viewed as even superior to that of Shelby's. The Indians won the game 20–0 and brought the Ohio title back to Akron.

For his 1914 recruiting efforts, Parratt signed the usual big-name players, which consisted of a lineup that changed from week to week, with just enough stars on hand to guarantee a win. However, in 1914, he also employed several former Notre Dame stars, including the legendary Knute Rockne, Howard "Horse" Edwards, "Deke" Jones, and Joe Collins, as well as several Ohio collegiate stars like Milton C. Portmann, Ed Kagy, Dwight Wertz, Homer Davidson, Frank Nesser, and Ralph "Fat" Waldsmith. By late season, the entire left side of his Akron Indian line was from Notre Dame. The team dominated the Ohio League for the season. However, it managed to lose to Canton 6–0 on November 15, 1914. Despite the win, Canton's captain Harry Turner died when his spine broke during a tackle on Akron fullback Joe Collins. Turner's death marked the first fatal accident involving a major professional football team in Ohio.

To avoid an Akron title in 1915 the owners of the Massillon Tigers raided Parratt's Akron roster and took away many of his star players. Canton manager Jack Cusack also picked up some former Akron players and signed Jim Thorpe to his renamed Canton Bulldogs team. By the end of the season, Parratt's team was made up mostly of Akron sandlotters. After the disastrous 1915 season, Parratt returned to Cleveland, where he took some of his former Akron players and a few ex-collegians and formed a respectable team, which he named the Cleveland Tigers.

=== Burkhardts ===
In 1916 a local brewer, Burkhardt Brewing Company, took over the remains of the Indians and renamed the club the Akron Burkhardts. The team was reorganized by Howe Welch and his brothers Chang and Suey. After three seasons, Welch was a player, coach, and manager for Akron, playing against many of professional football's early stars. The 1916 Burkhardts had a winning record despite falling to the Bulldogs and splitting a two-game series with the Columbus Panhandles. In 1918 the team was once again renamed the Indians, however, this is disputed due to many records of the time still referring to the club as the Burkhardts until 1920. The 1919 team, finished their season 5–5–0. However, the Indians lost money despite the presence of one of the country's best breakaway runners, Fritz Pollard, the league's first black player. From 1917 through at least 1921, the Indians name was sold off to Suey Welch, who fielded it as an independent club.

=== Pros ===
After experiencing financial losses from 1912 to 1919, the team was sold to Art Ranney, an Akron businessman and former football player at the University of Akron, and Frank Nied, a cigar store proprietor in 1920. The new owners soon dropped the Indian moniker and went with "Pros", hoping to inspire better results, or at least better attendance. Nied and Ranney befriended and signed Fritz Pollard to their team. The two co-owners later made Pollard the first African-American coach in the NFL.

==== Founding of the National Football League (NFL) ====
The minutes for the September 17, 1920, meeting that formed the APFA, were kept on the stationery of the Akron Pros football team by one of the owners, Art Ranney. Ranney was then elected secretary-treasurer of the league (later renamed the National Football League in 1922).

==== 1920 NFL champions ====
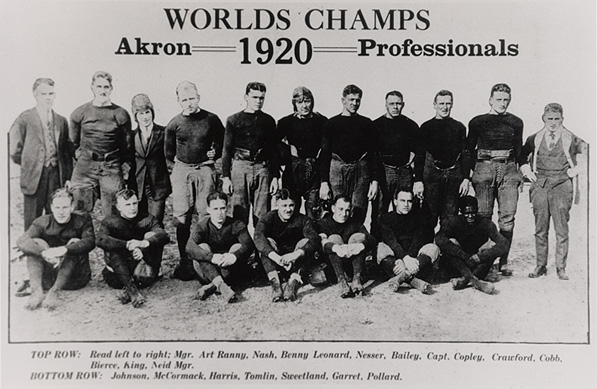
Akron Pros' 1920 team photo

Pollard and most of the top 1919 players planned to return to the Pros in 1920. The team opened the season at League Park in early October by defeating the Wheeling Stogies, 43–0. Al Nesser, one of the infamous football-playing Nesser Brothers, scored three touchdowns on fumble recoveries. The following week the Pros defeated the Columbus Panhandles 37–0 using former guard, Frank McCormick as a wingback. After a 13–0 win over the Cincinnati Celts, the Pros played the Cleveland Tigers, a team composed mainly of ex-stars from the Massillon Tigers. Bob Nash, who played for Massillon in 1919, broke up a Stan Cofall punt resulting in an Akron touchdown and a final score of 7–0. The Pros then shocked the league by beating the Canton Bulldogs, who were considered the top team in the nation in 1920 with stars Jim Thorpe, Joe Guyon, Pete Calac, and Pete Henry, 10–0. However, after a rained-out game against the Detroit Heralds, the Pros played a reorganized Tigers team that held the Pros to a 7–7 tie. The team, under the rushing of Pollard and McCormick, rebounded by defeating the Dayton Triangles 13–0. After a 7–0 victory in a rematch to Canton, as well as a second win over Dayton, the Pros were recognized as the top team in Ohio.

The Pros then held the Buffalo All-Americans to a scoreless tie in front of only 3,000. At the game, Nied and Ranney agreed to sell Bob Nash to Buffalo for $300 and five percent of the gate in the first known player deal between NFL clubs. However, since the Pros held the best record in the league, they only had to avoid losing a game, while Buffalo and the Decatur Staleys had to win to capture the AFPA Championship. The Pros held the Staleys to a scoreless tie in front of 12,000 fans at Cub Park.

Both the All-Americans and the Staleys complained about the championship, arguing that Akron had not defeated them. The Pros were not named the AFPA Champs until April 30, 1921, after the team managers got together at Canton and voted the title to Akron, granting the team the Brunswick-Balke Collender Cup. (Not coincidentally, Ranney, then the league's secretary, presided over the meeting as de facto President of the league, since neither President Jim Thorpe nor Vice President Stan Cofall appeared at the meeting.) According to modern NFL tie-breaking rules, the 1920 Buffalo All-Americans would be co-champions. They would be tied with the Pros in win percentage, 9 1/2 wins to 1 1/2 losses (.864), both teams beating out the Decatur Staleys, who would have a season that counted 11 wins to 2 losses (.846).

=== Decline ===
The Pros finished in 3rd place in 1921 and 10th place in 1922. The team only finished higher than 13th place in 1925, when it completed the season at fifth. Following the 1925 season, the Pros returned to being the Akron Indians. This new team played for the next four seasons before disbanding due to declining financial support and the team's poor record after the 1926 season. The team suspended operations in 1927 and formally surrendered its franchise the following year.

== Hall of famers ==
Akron Pros Hall of Famers
Players
No.	Name	Position	Tenure	Inducted
—	Fritz Pollard	HB	1920–1921	2005

== Season records ==
Season	Team	League	Regular season				Post Season Results	References
Season	Team	League	Finish	W	L	T	Post Season Results	References
Akron Pros
1920	1920	APFA †	1st †	8	0	3 ♦	Named APFA Champions †	
1921	1921	APFA	3rd	8	3	1	The APFA did not hold playoff games	
1922	1922	NFL	10th	3	5	2	The NFL did not hold playoff games until 1932	
1923	1923	NFL	16th	1	6	0	The NFL did not hold playoff games until 1932	
1924	1924	NFL	13th	2	6	0	The NFL did not hold playoff games until 1932	
1925	1925	NFL	T-4th	4	2	2	The NFL did not hold playoff games until 1932	
Akron Indians
1926	1926	NFL	T-16th	1	4	3	The NFL did not have playoff games until 1932	

=== Legend ===
Finish	Final position in league, division, or conference
W	Wins
L	Loses
T	Ties
T-#	Finished tied in that position with one or more teams
†	NFL champions (1920–1969)
♦	League leader

== Notes ==
Achievements
Preceded by Massillon Tigers; 1903–1907	Ohio League Champions; Akron Indians; 1908 & 1909	Succeeded by Shelby Blues & Shelby Tigers; 1910
Preceded by Elyria Athletics; 1912	Ohio League Champions; Akron Indians; 1913 & 1914	Succeeded by Youngstown Patricians; Massillon Tigers; Canton Bulldogs; 1915
Preceded by First	APFA Champions; Akron Pros; 1920	Succeeded by Chicago Staleys; 1921
