= Shelby Blues =

American football team based in Shelby, Ohio

General information
- Founded: 1900
- Folded: 1928
- Headquartered: Shelby, Ohio, U.S.
- Colors: Blue, White

Personnel
- Head coach: Peggy Parratt (1910–1911)

Team history
- Shelby Blues (1905–1928)

League / conference affiliations
- Ohio League (1902–1919); Independent (1926–1928)

The Shelby Blues was an American football team based in Shelby, Ohio. The team played in the Ohio League from 1900 to 1919. In 1920, when the Ohio League became the APFA (now known as the National Football League), the Blues did not join but continued to play against APFA teams, only to later suspend operations. The Blues returned to play as an independent between 1926 and 1928.

The team was named for their blue uniforms that were worn in their first year. In 1905, the Blues replaced the Shelby Athletic Club as the top football team in town. A year later the team was the runner-up for the Ohio League title, behind only the Akron Indians. The Blues won Ohio League championships in 1910 and 1911, with Peggy Parratt, an early pioneer and master of the forward pass, at quarterback. In 1904, the Blues are credited with signing the first black player in American professional football, halfback Charles Follis.

1902 Shelby Blues team photo

== Notable players and alumni ==
- Peggy Parratt (BB/QB) – Early pioneer of the forward pass.
- Milton C. Portmann (OL/DL) Decorated US Army Officer of WWI and professional football player.
- Charles Follis (HB) – First black professional player in American football.
- Branch Rickey – Baseball pioneer, was instrumental in breaking Major League Baseball's color barrier.
- John Miller (HB) – First year captain, would later managed and coached the team.
- Homer Davidson (BB/K) – Considered to be the best kicker of the era.
- Frank C. Schiffer (Manager) – Signed the first black professional player in American football (Charles Follis).
- Guy Schulz (C) – Brother of Germany Schulz.

Achievements
Preceded by Akron Indians; 1908–1909	Ohio League Champions; Shelby Tigers & Shelby Blues; 1910	Succeeded by Shelby Blues; 1911
Preceded by Shelby Blues & Shelby Tigers; 1910	Ohio League Champions; Shelby Blues; 1911	Succeeded by Elyria Athletics; 1912
