= Elyria Athletics =

Defunct American football team

General information
- Founded: 1912
- Folded: 1920
- Headquartered: Elyria, Ohio, U.S.

Team history
- Elyria Athletics (1912–1920)

League / conference affiliations
- Ohio League (1919); Independent (1920)

The Elyria Athletics were an American football team based in Elyria, Ohio. They played in the Ohio League until 1919, and then became an independent team. The team won the 1912 Ohio League championship, with an upset win over Peggy Parratt's Akron Indians.

However, the team declined to join the American Professional Football Association, later known as the National Football League, in 1920. Still the Athletics did continue to play APFA teams, including a Thanksgiving game against the Columbus Panhandles. The team folded after the 1920 season.

== Notes ==
Achievements
Preceded by Shelby Blues; 1911	Ohio League Champions; Elyria Athletics; 1912	Succeeded by Akron Indians; 1913 & 1914
