= Ohio League =

Precursor to NFL

- Sport: American football
- Founded: 1902
- First season: 1902
- Folded: 1919
- Claim to fame: Predecessor to the National Football League (NFL)
- No. of teams: 23
- Country: United States
- Venues: Armory Park; Idora Park; Indianola Park; League Field; League Park; Luna Bowl; Swayne Field; Tank Stadium; Triangle Park
- Last champion: Canton Bulldogs
- Most titles: Massillon Tigers (5)
- Related competitions: New York Pro Football League (NYPFL); Western Pennsylvania Professional Football Circuit; Chicago League

The Ohio League was an informal and loose association of American football clubs active between 1902 and 1919 that competed for the Ohio Independent Championship (OIC). As the name implied, its teams were mostly based in Ohio. It is the direct predecessor to the modern National Football League (NFL).

A proposal to add teams from outside Ohio, such as the Latrobe Athletic Association, to form a formal league known as the "Football Association" fell through prior to the 1904 season.

Though a champion was declared by the group throughout its existence, a formal league was not founded until 1920, when several Ohio League teams added clubs from other states to form the American Professional Football Association. In 1922, the APFA became the National Football League.

All but one of the remaining Ohio League teams left the NFL after the 1926 season, with the sole remaining team, the Dayton Triangles, surviving until 1929, before moving to Brooklyn, playing as the Dodgers. That team merged with the Boston Yanks in 1945. The merger ended after the end of 1945 season. The league cancelled the Brooklyn franchise.

== Championships ==
Year	Champion	W	L	T	Deciding game
1902	Akron East Ends				
1903	Massillon Tigers	8	1	0	def. Akron East Ends, 11-0
1904	Massillon Tigers	7	0	0	def. Akron East Ends, 6-5
1905	Massillon Tigers	10	0	0	def. Canton Bulldogs, 10-0
1906	Massillon Tigers	10	1	0	def. Canton Bulldogs, 13-6
1907	Massillon Tigers	7	0	1	
1908	Akron Indians	8	0	1	
1909	Akron Indians	9	0	0	def. Shelby Blues, 12-9
1910	Shelby Blues and Shelby Tigers	14	0	1	def. Akron Indians, 8-5
1911	Shelby Blues	10	0	0	def. Canton Bulldogs, 1-0 (forfeit)
1912	Elyria Athletics	8	0	0	def. Akron Indians
1913	Akron Indians	8	1	2	def. Shelby Blues, 20-0
1914	Akron Parratt's Indians	8	2	1	def. Canton Bulldogs, 21-0
1915	Disputed				
1916	Canton Bulldogs	9	0	1	def. Massillon Tigers, 24-0
1917	Canton Bulldogs	9	1	0	def. Detroit Heralds, 7-0
1918	Dayton Triangles	8	0	0	def. Detroit Heralds
1919	Canton Bulldogs	9	0	1	

== Other teams ==
- Akron Pros
- Cincinnati Celts
- Cleveland Panthers (debuted 1919, mainly played non-Ohio teams)
- Cleveland Tigers
- Coleman Athletic Club
- Columbus Panhandles
- Franklin Athletic Club of Cleveland
- Ironton Tanks (merger of Irish Town Rags and the Lombards)
- Lancaster Anchors
- Portsmouth Spartans (moved to Detroit in 1933, now known as the Detroit Lions)
- Shelby Tigers (merged with Shelby Blues in 1911)
- Toledo Maroons
- Washington Vigilants
- Youngstown Patricians
- Zanesville Mark Greys

Further, the Detroit Heralds, though based in Michigan, played many of its games against Ohio teams.

== Successor leagues ==
=== Ohio Valley League (1925-1929) ===
Some of the better teams of the 1920s, who did not join the NFL existed in the Ohio Valley, and would form an unofficial but recognized circuit - The Ohio Valley League - which resembled the old Ohio League. The "league" collapsed at the beginning of the Great Depression.

The two stronger teams in the league were the Portsmouth Spartans and the Ironton Tanks, that in the year after the circuit died (1930) beat the New York Giants and Chicago Bears, while the Spartans would join the NFL and would later become the Detroit Lions. Two other noteworthy teams were the Armco Corporation employees teams - Ashland Armco Yellowjackets (Kentucky) and Middletown Armco Blues (Ohio), who featured many former college All-Americans, including Red Roberts.

==== Champions ====
1925 Ironton Tanks (9-1-2)
1926 Ironton Tanks (11-1-1)
1927 Ashland Armco Yellowjackets (7-1-3)
1928 Ironton Tanks (7-1-3)
1929 Portsmouth Spartans (12-2-1)

=== Ohio Professional Football League (1941) ===
In 1941, there was a resurgence in pro football in Ohio, as local teams tried to form a new professional league called The Ohio Professional Football League (also known as Ohio Valley League). Six teams came together in an attempt to restore the region's former old glory: The Dayton Dakotas, Dayton Merchants, Cincinnati Pepsi-Colas, Columbus Avondales, Middletown Merchants, and another Canadian team the Thomas Athletic Club from Windsor, Ontario, but they withdrew from the league before the season started.

The circuit operated on a much smaller scale from previous leagues, and did not return for a second season.

1941 League standings
Team	W	L	T	PCT
Cincinnati Pepsi-Colas	7	0	0	1.000
Dayton Dakotas	5	2	0	.714
Middletown Merchants	3	3	1	.500
Columbus Avondales	1	5	0	.167
Dayton Merchants	0	7	1	.063

== See also ==
- Canton Bulldogs-Massillon Tigers Betting Scandal
- History of the National Football League
- New York Pro Football League, another NFL predecessor
- Western Pennsylvania Professional Football Circuit, another early pro football circuit that competed at times with various Ohio League teams.

== Notes ==
- Braunwart, Bob; Carroll, Bob (1981). "The Ohio League" (PDF). The Coffin Corner. 3 (7). Professional Football Researchers Association. Archived from the original (PDF) on 2014-08-22.
- NFL.com history pages: 1869-1910 and 1911-1920
- Sye, Roy. Independent Football History (Sye is Vice-President of the Professional Football Researchers Association committee in charge of researching professional football prior to 1920.)
