= Case Western Reserve Spartans =

Varsity intercollegiate athletic team

- University: Case Western Reserve University
- Nickname: Spartans
- NCAA: Division III
- Conference: University Athletic Association; Presidents' Athletic Conference (Football only)
- Athletic director: TJ Shelton
- Location: Cleveland, Ohio
- Varsity teams: 19
- Football stadium: DiSanto Field
- Basketball arena: Horsburgh Gymnasium
- Baseball stadium: Nobby's Ballpark (Baseball) Mather Park (Softball)
- Other venues: Adelbert Gymnasium
- Colors: CWRU Blue, white, and gray
- Mascot: Spartie
- Fight song: Fight On
- Website: athletics.case.edu
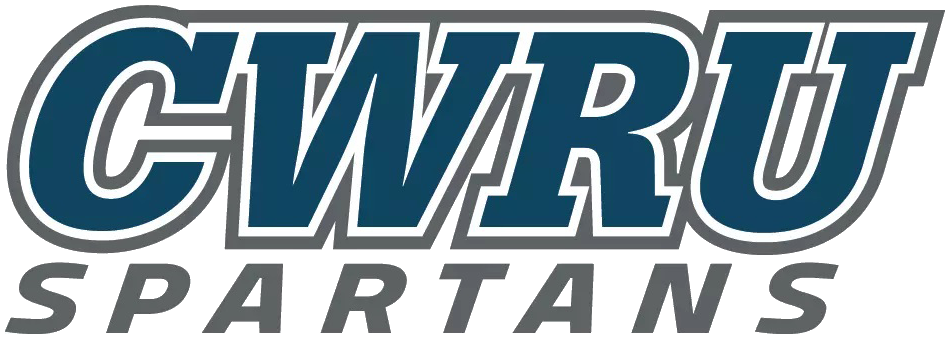

Men's sports	Women's sports
Baseball	Basketball
Basketball	Cross country
Cross country	Soccer
Football	Softball
Soccer	Swimming & diving
Swimming & diving	Tennis
Tennis	Track & field^{†}
Track & field^{†}	Volleyball
Wrestling	
† – Track and field includes both indoor and outdoor.

The Case Western Reserve Spartans are the varsity intercollegiate athletic teams of Case Western Reserve University, located in Cleveland, Ohio, United States. Case Western Reserve University competes at the NCAA Division III level. The Spartans compete in the University Athletic Association (UAA), except in football where the team competes as an associate member of the Presidents' Athletic Conference (PAC). The university offers 19 sports—10 men's sports and 9 women's sports.

All 19 varsity teams wear a commemorative patch on their uniforms honoring Case alumnus, M. Frank Rudy, inventor of the Nike air-sole.

The Spartans' primary athletic rival is Carnegie Mellon University.

== History ==
The Case Western Reserve Spartans' heritage stems from the combination of two long and storied sports histories of Western Reserve University and Case Institute of Technology.

=== Mascots ===
Case, originally known as Case School of Applied Science, carried the name Scientists from 1918 to 1939. In 1940, the mascot was changed to the Rough Riders, in honor of their head coach Ray A. Ride. Case formally updated its school name in 1947 to Case Institute of Technology. Western Reserve originally used the mascot Pioneers from 1921 to 1927, until being forced to change by Marietta College, who claimed earlier usage of the namesake. The famous Red Cats mascot was then used beginning in 1928. Upon the merger of the two schools, the Spartans name was adopted in 1970, as the team is now known.

=== Conferences ===
In 1902, Case Tech and Western Reserve University were both founding members of the Ohio Athletic Conference (OAC). Western Reserve left the OAC in 1931 to compete as an independent, while Case Tech stayed in until 1948. Breaking away from independence and looking to compete with larger schools, Western Reserve became a charter member of the Mid-American Conference (MAC) in 1946. After less than a decade, Western Reserve withdrew from the MAC in 1954, citing the need for the school to focus more energy on academics and less money and resources on athletics spearheaded by President John S. Millis.

Returning to their roots of competing in the same conference, Case Tech and Western Reserve became founding members of the Presidents' Athletic Conference (PAC) in 1955. When the athletic departments of the two universities merged in 1971 they dominated the PAC for several years. The university remained a member of the PAC until 1983. In the fall of 1984 the university joined the North Coast Athletic Conference (NCAC), a pioneer in gender equality in sports, as a charter member. In conjunction with other top research universities in the country, Case Western Reserve became a charter member of University Athletic Association (UAA) in 1986, while maintaining joint conference membership affiliation with the NCAC until the 1998–1999 school year. In 2014, the football team, while maintaining membership in the UAA, began competing as an associate member of the PAC.

Founding charter members of five conferences:

- Ohio Athletic Conference (OAC), 1902 (Case Tech and Western Reserve)
- Mid-American Conference (MAC), 1946 (Western Reserve)
- Presidents' Athletic Conference (PAC), 1955 (Case Tech and Western Reserve)
- North Coast Athletic Conference (NCAC), 1984 (Case Western Reserve)
- University Athletic Association (UAA), 1986 (Case Western Reserve)

== NCAA National champions ==
=== Team ===
Year	Winner	Sport
2023	Case Western Reserve	Men's Tennis

=== Individual ===
Year	Winner	Name	Sport	Event
1968	Case	C.B. Crouse	Outdoor Track & Field	Discus Throw
1970	Case Western Reserve	John Nadas	Fencing	Épée
1982	Case Western Reserve	Lisa Bernard	Swimming & Diving	1,650-yard freestyle
1987	Case Western Reserve	Vincent Van Burik	Outdoor Track & Field	800-meter run
1988	Case Western Reserve	John Bradshaw	Swimming & Diving	100-yard butterfly
1989	Case Western Reserve	John Bradshaw	Swimming & Diving	100-yard butterfly
1990	Case Western Reserve	Sheila Ballado	Outdoor Track & Field	100-meter hurdles
1990	Case Western Reserve	Kevin Luthy	Outdoor Track & Field	Decathlon
1991	Case Western Reserve	Kevin Luthy	Outdoor Track & Field	Decathlon
1992	Case Western Reserve	Jay Gindin	Swimming & Diving	200-yard butterfly
1994	Case Western Reserve	Chris Ricklic	Wrestling	167 pounds
1995	Case Western Reserve	Leslie Kindling	Indoor Track & Field	High Jump
1995	Case Western Reserve	Chris Ricklic	Wrestling	167 pounds
1995	Case Western Reserve	Leslie Kindling	Outdoor Track & Field	Heptathlon
1996	Case Western Reserve	Derek Messmer	Wrestling	Heavyweight
2003	Case Western Reserve	Alicia Kendig	Swimming & Diving	500-yard freestyle
2008	Case Western Reserve	Esther Erb	Outdoor Track & Field	10,000-meter run
2010	Case Western Reserve	Isaac Dukes	Wrestling	149 pounds
2010	Case Western Reserve	Obinna Nwanna	Outdoor Track & Field	Decathlon
2014	Case Western Reserve	Eric Klawitter	Men's Tennis	Doubles
2014	Case Western Reserve	Christopher Krimbill	Men's Tennis	Doubles
2019	Case Western Reserve	Cassandra Laios	Outdoor Track & Field	Hammer Throw
2022	Case Western Reserve	James Hopper	Men's Tennis	Doubles
2022	Case Western Reserve	Jonathan Powell	Men's Tennis	Doubles
2023	Case Western Reserve	James Hopper	Men's Tennis	Doubles
2023	Case Western Reserve	Vishwa Aduru	Men's Tennis	Doubles

== Sports ==
=== Football ===
Conference Titles:

Year	Winner	Coach	Conference	Postseason
1902	Case	Joseph Wentworth	OAC
1903	Case	Joseph Wentworth	OAC
1904	Case	Joseph Wentworth	OAC
1905	Case	Joseph Wentworth	OAC
1907	Western Reserve	William B. Seaman	OAC
1908	Western Reserve	William B. Seaman	OAC
1915	Western Reserve	Walter D. Powell	OAC
1932	Case	Ray Ride	OAC
1933	Case	Ray Ride	Big Four Conference
1934	Western Reserve	Sam Willaman	Big Four Conference
1935	Western Reserve	Bill Edwards	Big Four Conference
1936	Western Reserve	Bill Edwards	Big Four Conference
1937	Western Reserve	Bill Edwards	Big Four Conference
1938	Western Reserve	Bill Edwards	Big Four Conference
1940	Western Reserve	Bill Edwards	Big Four Conference	Won Sun Bowl
1941	Case	Ray Ride	OAC
1941	Western Reserve	Tom Davies	Big Four Conference
1942	Western Reserve	Tom Davies	Big Four Conference
1955	Western Reserve	Eddie Finnigan	PAC
1958	Western Reserve	Eddie Finnigan	PAC
1960	Western Reserve	Eddie Finnigan	PAC
1984	Case Western Reserve	Jim Chapman	NCAC
1988	Case Western Reserve	Ronald Stuckey	UAA
1996	Case Western Reserve	Regis Scafe	UAA
2007	Case Western Reserve	Greg Debeljak	UAA	Won vs Widener, Loss vs Wabash
2008	Case Western Reserve	Greg Debeljak	UAA	Loss vs Wabash
2009	Case Western Reserve	Greg Debeljak	UAA	Loss vs Trine
2011	Case Western Reserve	Greg Debeljak	UAA
2016	Case Western Reserve	Greg Debeljak	UAA
2017	Case Western Reserve	Greg Debeljak	PAC & UAA	Won vs Illinois Wesleyan, Loss vs Mount Union
2019	Case Western Reserve	Greg Debeljak	PAC	Loss vs Union

=== Men's tennis ===
The 2023 men's tennis team won the school's first ever team national championship, defeating the Tufts University Jumbos 5–2 in the NCAA Division III national finals match. The team finished 33–4 overall, including a perfect 28–0 record against Division III competition. The Spartans also won the University Athletic Association (UAA) title.

The 2022 team finished the season again as the National Runner-Up, this time losing to another UAA foe, University of Chicago. In tournament play, the team defeated Ohio Northern, Wisconsin–Whitewater, Williams, and Middlebury. James Hopper and Jonathan Powell won the NCAA men's doubles national title. At the beginning of the season, the team won the 2022 ITA Division III Men’s National Team Indoor Championship.

In 2021, the team went undefeated in Division III regular season play, finishing as the National Runner-Up losing to Emory. In the tournament, the team defeated Illinois Tech, Gustavus Adolphus, Trinity (TX), and Washington (MO).

In 2019, Matthew Chen and James Hopper won the Division III doubles title in the 2019 ITA Cup.

In 2014, the Spartan men's tennis team was ranked in the Division III Top 10 for most of the season, and advanced to the NCAA Elite Eight before falling to Middlebury College. That same year, two CWRU tennis players, Eric Klawitter and Christopher Krimbill, won the NCAA men's doubles national title.

Conference Titles:

Year	Winner	Coach	Conference	Postseason
1965	Western Reserve	Arthur I. Rosenberg	PAC
1970	Western Reserve	Arthur I. Rosenberg	PAC
1971	Western Reserve	Arthur I. Rosenberg	PAC
1972	Case Western Reserve	Douglas E. Mooney	PAC
1973	Case Western Reserve	Douglas E. Mooney	PAC
1974	Case Western Reserve	Douglas E. Mooney	PAC
1975	Case Western Reserve	Douglas E. Mooney	PAC
1976	Case Western Reserve	Douglas E. Mooney	PAC
1977	Case Western Reserve	Douglas E. Mooney	PAC
1978	Case Western Reserve	Douglas E. Mooney	PAC
1979	Case Western Reserve	Douglas E. Mooney	PAC
2013	Case Western Reserve	Todd Wojtkowski	none	Sweet 16
2014	Case Western Reserve	Todd Wojtkowski	none	Elite 8
2016	Case Western Reserve	Todd Wojtkowski	none	Sweet 16
2021	Case Western Reserve	Todd Wojtkowski	none	National Runner-Up
2022	Case Western Reserve	Todd Wojtkowski	none	National Runner-Up
2023	Case Western Reserve	Todd Wojtkowski	UAA	National Champion
2024	Case Western Reserve	Todd Wojtkowski	none	Elite 8
2025	Case Western Reserve	Todd Wojtkowski	UAA	National Runner-Up
2026	Case Western Reserve	Todd Wojtkowski	none	Final 4

=== Men's cross country ===
Since 1972, the Spartans have had fourteen All-Americans. In 1972, Greg Bowser finished 14th. In 1973, Jeff Tanchon and Greg Bowser finished 15th and 16th respectively. In 1974, Greg Bowser and Doug Leary finished 6th and 19th. In 1975, Peter Kummant finished 2nd, the best finish for any Spartan cross country runner to date. In 1976 and 1977, Peter Kummant finished 6th and 10th. It took 16 years for the Spartans to put another runner on the podium. In 1993, Steve Cullen finished 16th. In 1994, teammates Steve Cullen and Brian Casselberry finished 19th and 27th. After another 10 year drought, Aaron Johnston-Peck finished 7th in 2004. Most recently, Sam Merriman finished 21st and 11th in 2016 and 2017.

Additionally, since 1946, 119 male athletes and 16 teams have represented the university, with the best finish occurring in 1986 with a 7th-place finish. Four of those athletes sent either pre-date the All-American designation and/or would be considered All-Americans under new guidelines.

Conference Titles:

Year	Winner	Coach	Conference	All-Ohio	Postseason
1947	Case	Claude B. Sharer	OAC		12th Nationals
1958	Case	Bill Sudeck	PAC
1967	Case	Bill Sudeck	PAC
1968	Case	Bill Sudeck	PAC
1969	Case	Bill Sudeck	PAC		27th Nationals
1970	Case	Bill Sudeck	PAC
1971	Case Western Reserve	Bill Sudeck	PAC	13th (All Divisions)	40th Nationals
1972	Case Western Reserve	Bill Sudeck	PAC		26th Nationals
1973	Case Western Reserve	Bill Sudeck	PAC	5th (All-Divisions)	12th Nationals
1974	Case Western Reserve	Bill Sudeck	PAC	12th (All-Divisions)	15th Nationals
1975	Case Western Reserve	Bill Sudeck	PAC	2nd (All-Divisions)	13th Nationals
1976	Case Western Reserve	Bill Sudeck	PAC	3rd	20th Nationals
1977	Case Western Reserve	Bill Sudeck	PAC	12th (All-Divisions)	21st Nationals
1985	Case Western Reserve	Bill Sudeck	NCAC	5th (All-Divisions)	2nd Regional, 18th Nationals
1986	Case Western Reserve	Bill Sudeck	NCAC	9th (All-Divisions)	1st Regional, 7th Nationals
1988	Case Western Reserve	Bill Sudeck	NCAC	15th (All-Divisions)	6th Regional
1992	Case Western Reserve	Bill Sudeck	All-Ohio
1993	Case Western Reserve	Bill Sudeck	NCAC	1st All-Ohio
1993	Case Western Reserve	Bill Sudeck	UAA
1994	Case Western Reserve	Bill Sudeck	NCAC	3rd	4th Regional
2008	Case Western Reserve	Kathy Lanese	All-Ohio		5th Regional, 29th National

Individual Champions:

Year	Athlete	School	Conference
1959	Guido Wernicke	Case Institute of Tech.	PAC
1966	John Papp	Case Institute of Tech.	PAC
1967	Paul Ehrlich	Western Reserve	PAC
1970	Jim Detweiler	Case Institute of Tech.	PAC
1971	Greg Williams	Case Western Reserve	PAC
1971	Jeff Tanchon	Case Western Reserve	PAC
1972	Greg Bowser	Case Western Reserve	PAC
1973	Greg Bowser	Case Western Reserve	PAC
1974	Greg Bowser	Case Western Reserve	PAC
1975	Peter Kummant	Case Western Reserve	PAC
1976	Peter Kummant	Case Western Reserve	PAC
1977	Peter Kummant	Case Western Reserve	PAC
1978	Peter Kummant	Case Western Reserve	PAC
1985	Mark Roshon	Case Western Reserve	NCAC
1989	Karl Knoll	Case Western Reserve	NCAC
1993	Steve Cullen	Case Western Reserve	NCAC
1994	Brian Casselberry	Case Western Reserve	NCAC
2003	Steve Hrinda	Case Western Reserve	All-Ohio
2004	Aaron Johnson-Peck	Case Western Reserve	UAA
2008	Dominic Smith	Case Western Reserve	All-Ohio
2016	Sam Merriman	Case Western Reserve	All-Ohio

=== Women's cross country ===
The women's cross country team earned five consecutive team qualifying years to the NCAA Championship Meet from 2006 to 2010. In 2006, the team was undefeated up until Nationals, including defeating several Division I schools during the season. During this stretch, the Spartan women finished in the top 10 twice, including 2007, when the team finished sixth in the nation. individually during these five years, team members earned 8 All-American Titles, including multiple by future professional marathoner Esther Erb.

Conference Titles:

Year	Winner	Coach	Conference	Postseason
2006	Case Western Reserve	Kathy Lanese	UAA	1st Regionals, 10th Nationals
2008	Case Western Reserve	Kathy Lanese	UAA	2nd Regionals, 16th Nationals

=== Men's basketball ===
The 2024 team claimed its second UAA title, returning to the NCAA Division III men's basketball tournament.

The 2023 team claimed the UAA title for the first time in school history and returned to the NCAA Division III men's basketball tournament, winning their first game against Arcadia before falling to Wisconsin-Whitewater.

The 2022 team was the first team in school history to make the NCAA Division III men's basketball tournament, defeating Dubuque and Wisconsin-Oshkosh, before falling to Mary Hardin-Baylor in overtime in the Sweet 16.

Western Reserve's first varsity team was in 1897, only six years after the game was invented by Dr. James Naismith. Case Tech played its first varsity season in 1912.

The first college sporting event televised in Cleveland aired on December 18, 1947, where Western Reserve's basketball team defeated Fenn College, now the Cleveland State Vikings, at Adelbert Gym, 63–26.

Conference Titles and playoffs:

Year	Winner	Coach	Conference	Postseason
1960–1961	Case	Philip K. "Nip" Heim	PAC
1969–1970	Case	Bill Sudeck	PAC
2021–2022	Case Western Reserve	Todd McGuinness	none	Sweet 16
2022–2023	Case Western Reserve	Todd McGuinness	UAA	Round of 32
2023-2024	Case Western Reserve	Todd McGuinness	UAA	Sweet 16

=== Baseball ===
Varsity baseball teams for Western Reserve College date back to the 1870s. During this era, Clarence Emir Allen is famously credited as the first college baseball player to throw and perfect the curveball, and notably never lost a game once mastering the "curve." Other notable players in school history include Bob Kelly, Paul O'Dea, and Ed Andrews.

Western Reserve won the PAC in 1967 and 1968.

In recent years, the Case Western Reserve baseball team has competed in the NCAA playoffs, earning spots in 2011, 2013, 2014, 2019, 2023, 2024, and 2025.

In 2011, Spartan third baseman Chad Mullins was named the D3Baseball.com Player of the Year after hitting .437 with eight home runs and 71 RBIs. Mullins also ranked in the Division III national top ten in hits, runs scored, and total bases. The 2013 team won two NCAA playoff games and the UAA title. The 2014 team set a school record for victories with 34, won the UAA title, and won four playoff games advancing to the NCAA Mideast Regional Championship.

From 2013 to 2017, Bianca Smith served as director of baseball operations; she would later become the first black woman professional baseball coach, hired by the Boston Red Sox in 2021.

Conference Titles and Playoffs:

Year	Winner	Coach	Conference	Postseason
1967	Western Reserve	Flory Mauriocourt	PAC
1968	Western Reserve	Flory Mauriocourt	PAC
2013	Case Western Reserve	Matt Englander	UAA	Won vs St. Scholastica, St. Thomas, Loss vs Wisc-Whitewater, Wisc-Stevens Point
2014	Case Western Reserve	Matt Englander	UAA	Won vs Thomas More, La Roche, and Widener, Loss vs Salisbury
2018	Case Western Reserve	Matt Englander	UAA
2019	Case Western Reserve	Matt Englander	–	Won vs Otterbein, Rochester, Loss vs Wooster
2022	Case Western Reserve	Matt Englander	UAA
2023	Case Western Reserve	Matt Englander	–	Won vs Mary Washington, Loss vs Marietta, Loss vs Adrian
2024	Case Western Reserve	Matt Englander	UAA	Won vs Alvernia (2x), Loss vs Lynchburg (2x)
2025	Case Western Reserve	Matt Englander	UAA	Won vs North Central, Won vs Arcadia, Won vs Centre, Loss vs Johns Hopkins (2x)

=== Softball ===
Finishing with a school best record of 40–9, the 2024 team won its third consecutive UAA championship and made it to nationals played at Marshall, Texas for the NCAA Division III tournament for a second time in school history.

The 2023 team won the UAA and made it to the NCAA Division III tournament, finishing with a record of 38–5.

The 2022 team won the UAA and made it to the Sweet 16 of the NCAA Division III tournament, finishing the season 30–12.

During the 2018 season, Case Western Reserve softball team earned an at-large bid in the NCAA Division III tournament, making a deep run in the playoffs to nationals in Oklahoma City, Oklahoma, finishing the season ranked 6th nationally. The team won the first regional in school history, defeating Mt. Aloysius, St. Mary's, and Ohio Northern twice. The Spartans won the super regional against Hope, and achieved a win at nationals against Rowan, before being defeated by University of Texas at Tyler and Luther. The 2018 team finished the season 38–12.

The softball team previously had made the NCAA Division III tournament in 2001.

Karen (Chambers) Farrell founded the university softball team in 1996 and coached the first four seasons, winning three UAA titles in 1997, 1998, and 1999.

Conference Titles and Playoffs

Year	Winner	Coach	Conference	Postseason
1997	Case Western Reserve	Karen (Chambers) Farrell	UAA
1998	Case Western Reserve	Karen (Chambers) Farrell	UAA
1999	Case Western Reserve	Karen (Chambers) Farrell	UAA
2001	Case Western Reserve	Jennie Amodio	no title	?
2014	Case Western Reserve	Josie Henry	UAA
2018	Case Western Reserve	Josie Henry	no title	Loss vs Ohio Northern, Won vs Mt. Aloysius, Won vs St. Mary's, Won vs Ohio Northern (2x), Loss vs Hope, Won vs Hope (2x), Loss vs Texas-Tyler, Won vs Rowan, Loss vs Luther
2022	Case Western Reserve	Josie Henry	UAA	Won vs The College of New Jersey (2x), Loss vs Concordia (Wisconsin), Won vs Concordia (Wisconsin) (2x), Loss vs Trine (2x)
2023	Case Western Reserve	Josie Henry	UAA	Won vs Penn State Altoona, Loss vs Mount Union, Loss vs Hiram
2024	Case Western Reserve	Josie Henry	UAA	Won vs Penn St. Behrend, Loss vs Calvin, Won vs Dominican, Won vs Calvin (2x), Won vs Coe (2x), Loss vs Belhaven, Loss vs Rowan
2025	Case Western Reserve	Josie Henry	no title	Won Lebanon Valley (2x), Loss Wisconsin-Whitewater (2x)

=== Men's soccer ===
The 2006 men's soccer team finished the season with a 17–2–2 record, a UAA title, and first-ever playoff appearance. The team reached the Sweet 16 in the NCAA Division III tournament appearance and concluded the season ranked 12th in the nation. In 2011, the team returned to the NCAA Division III tournament after winning the UAA and finishing 15–5. In 2018, the team reemerged to national prominence, finishing 16–4–2 and making its deepest run in the NCAA Division III tournament, making it to the quarterfinals.

Conference Titles and Playoffs:

Year	Winner	Coach	Conference	Postseason
1958	Case	Claude B. Sharer	PAC
1960	Case	Claude B. Sharer	PAC
1961	Case	Claude B. Sharer	PAC
1962	Case	Claude B. Sharer	PAC
1965	Case	Claude B. Sharer	PAC
1966	Case	Claude B. Sharer	PAC
1967	Case	Philip K. Heim "Nip" and Joe Siklosi	PAC
1968	Western Reserve	Ronald P. "Buzz" Ellis	PAC
1969	Case	Eric Dobson	PAC
2006	Case Western Reserve	Dan Palmer	UAA	Won vs Denison, Tie vs Ohio Wesleyan
2011	Case Western Reserve	Dan Palmer	UAA	Won vs DePauw, Loss vs Ohio Northern
2018	Case Western Reserve	Brandon Bianco	no title	Won vs Keystone, Won vs Capital, Won vs Kenyon, Loss vs Calvin
2026	Case Western Reserve	Carter Poe	UAA	TBD

=== Men's outdoor track and field ===
Since 1968, the university has had 29 Outdoor All-Americans, including 5 National Champions, and an additional 26 NCAA qualifiers. The first and only relay team to qualify did so in the 4x400 in 2017, consisting of Jon Haling, Andrew Ibibo, Joe Cabral, and Nate Wahner. From 1985 to 1999, the Spartans had 45 NCAC individual champions.

Notably, the 1946 Western Reserve team was coached by Cleveland Browns halfback Don Greenwood while he was still a player.

Conference Titles:

Year	Winner	Coach	Conference	Postseason
1926	Case		NE Ohio
1927	Case		NE Ohio
1936	Western Reserve		Big Four
1937	Western Reserve		Big Four
1941	Case		Big Four
1958	Western Reserve	Herbert Bee	PAC
1959	Western Reserve	Herbert Bee	PAC
1960	Western Reserve	Herbert Bee	PAC
1967	Case	Bill Sudeck	PAC	10th All-Ohio
1968	Case	Bill Sudeck	PAC	10th Regional, 17th Nationals
1970	Case	Bill Sudeck	PAC
1971	Case	Bill Sudeck	PAC
1972	Case Western Reserve	Bill Sudeck	PAC
1973	Case Western Reserve	Bill Sudeck	PAC
1974	Case Western Reserve	Bill Sudeck	PAC	T-32nd Nationals
1975	Case Western Reserve	Bill Sudeck	PAC
1978	Case Western Reserve	Bill Sudeck	PAC	T-48th Nationals
1994	Case Western Reserve	Bill Sudeck	NCAC	T-36th Nationals
1994	Case Western Reserve	Bill Sudeck	UAA

=== Men's indoor track and field ===
Conference Titles:

Year	Winner	Coach	Conference	Postseason
1994	Case Western Reserve	Bill Sudeck	NCAC
1995	Case Western Reserve	Bill Sudeck	NCAC

=== Women's soccer ===
The women's soccer team played their first season in 1984. The team made it to the NCAA tournament in 2011, 2019, and from 2021 to 2024.

In 2021, the Spartans went 16–2–2 and finished the regular season ranked 10th nationally. The 16 wins were the most victories in a single season in program history, also advancing three games into the tournament.

The 2022 season set a new record for wins in a single season at 20–1–1, under first year head coach Abby Richter, finishing as the National Runner Up losing to Johns Hopkins.

The 2023 team made it for a third straight year to the NCAA Tournament, winning one playoff game.

The 2024 team made it for a fourth straight year to the NCAA Tournament, winning one playoff game.

Conference Titles and Playoffs:

Year	Winner	Coach	Conference	Postseason
2011	Case Western Reserve	Tiffany Crooks	no title	Won vs Lebanon Valley, Loss vs Cortland State
2019	Case Western Reserve	Jen Simonetti	no title	Tie vs Wooster
2021	Case Western Reserve	Jen Simonetti	no title	Won vs Chatham, Won vs Ohio Northern, Loss vs Chicago
2022	Case Western Reserve	Abby Richter	UAA	Won vs Pitt-Greensburg, Won vs Ithaca, Won vs Loras, Won vs William Smith, Won vs Virginia Wesleyan, Loss vs Johns Hopkins
2023	Case Western Reserve	Abby Richter	no title	Won vs Grove City, Loss vs John Carroll
2024	Case Western Reserve	Abby Richter	no title	Won vs Skidmore, Loss vs Messiah

=== Women's tennis ===
In 2022, the team made it to the third round of the NCAA Women's Division III Doubles Championships, before losing to the eventual Division III NCAA Champion, Claremont-Mudd-Scripps.

In 2018, doubles pair Nithya Kanagasegar and Madeleine Paolucci were named the first All-Americans in program history. Nationally ranked, they advanced to the quarterfinals of NCAA Women's Division III Doubles Championships in Claremont, California.

=== Women's volleyball ===
In 1971, volleyball became the first documented Case Western Reserve women’s varsity sport, established shortly before Title IX was passed in 1972.

During the 2010 and 2015 seasons, the team made the NCAA Division III Tournament, earning their first tournament win in 2015, led by coach Karen Farrell.

Year	Winner	Coach	Conference	Postseason
2010	Case Western Reserve	Karen Farrell	none	First Round
2015	Case Western Reserve	Karen Farrell	none	Second Round

=== Wrestling ===
Case Western Reserve wrestling has won four individual NCAA Division III national titles and produced Olympic wrestler William Kerslake.

Conference Titles:

Year	Winner	Coach	Conference	Postseason
1961	Western Reserve	Edward W. Lewis	PAC
1988	Case Western Reserve	Bob Del Rosa	UAA
1991	Case Western Reserve	Bob Del Rosa	UAA
1993	Case Western Reserve	Bob Del Rosa	UAA
1994	Case Western Reserve	Bob Del Rosa	UAA
1996	Case Western Reserve	Bob Del Rosa	UAA

== University Athletic Association championships ==
- Football: 1988, 1996, 2007, 2008, 2009, 2011, 2016, 2017
- Softball: 1997, 1998, 1999, 2014, 2022, 2023, 2024
- Baseball: 2013, 2014, 2018, 2022, 2024, 2025
- Wrestling: 1988, 1991, 1993, 1994, 1996
- Men's Tennis: 2023, 2025
- Men's Basketball: 2023, 2024
- Men's Soccer: 2006, 2011
- Women's Cross Country: 2006, 2008
- Men's Track & Field (Outdoor): 1994
- Men's Cross Country: 1993

== Olympians ==
Year	Winner	Name	Sport	Event	Medal
1932	Western Reserve	M. "Flip" Rowland Wolfe	Gymnastics	Tumbling	Gold
1952	Case	William Kerslake	Wrestling	Heavyweight
1956	Western Reserve	Caldwell Esselstyn	Rowing		Gold
1956	Case	William Kerslake	Wrestling	Heavyweight
1956	Western Reserve	David Jenkins	Figure Skating		Bronze
1960	Case	William Kerslake	Wrestling	Heavyweight
1960	Western Reserve	David Jenkins	Figure Skating		Gold
1964	Western Reserve	Sandra Knott	Outdoor Track & Field	800-meter run
1980	Case Western Reserve	Walter "Ty" Danco	Luge
1996	Case Western Reserve	Matt Ghaffari	Wrestling	Greco-Roman	Silver

== Fight song ==
John F. Anderson, a Case Tech alum of 1933, composed the music and lyrics of the Case Western Reserve fight song.

Fight On
Fight on, you men of Case Reserve
Make foemen fear your strength and verve
Display the old unflinching nerve—
Go, Case Reserve, fight on!
In days of yore in annual bout
Across the fence, we fought it out
The fence is down, today we shout:
Go, Case Reserve, fight on!
The blue and white team we'll uphold
Old Case Reserve will never fold
So, on to vict'ries yet untold
Go, Case Reserve, fight on!

== Facilities ==
=== DiSanto Field ===
DiSanto Field is a 2,400-seat multi-purpose stadium home to the football, men's soccer, women's soccer, and track and field teams.

The press box includes the Coach Bill Edwards president's suite, named after the College Football Hall of Fame inductee coach. In 2008, the eight-lane track surrounding the field was named Coach Bill Sudeck Track. In 2014, the Wyant Field House opened, which included the 4500-square foot Steve Belichick Varsity Weight Room, gifted by Bill Belichick in honor of his father.

=== Nobby's Ballpark ===
Home to the Case Western Reserve Spartans baseball team, Nobby's Ballpark seats 500 fans and sit between the streets of East 115th and East 118 along Wade Park Ave and Finnegan's Way. The ballpark opened in 2006 thanks to the contribution of alumnus Nobby Lewandowski. In 2009, the new public address system and naming of the press box was provided by Tom and Cynthia Friedberg. In 2013, Nobby Lewandowski gifted a state-of-the-art scoreboard. An Astroturf infield was installed prior to the 2018 season, increasing playability in poor weather, while the outfield consists of natural grass.

=== Mather Park ===
Mather Park is home to the Spartan softball team and seats 250 fans. The park sits along Mistletoe Drive near its intersection with Wade Park Ave. In April 2008, the facility was officially renamed after the Flora Stone Mather Alumnae Association, after its endowment was transferred to Case Western Reserve University. In 2009, Vice President for Student Affairs, Glenn Nicholls, made a donation in honor of his late wife, Peggy, for a new press box. The field was dedicated on April 15, 2009. A state-of-the-art scoreboard was added during the 2012 season by the Mather Alumnae Association.

=== Horsburgh Gymnasium ===
Home to the Spartan basketball, wrestling, and volleyball teams, Horsburgh Gymnasium holds a capacity of 1,600 fans. Named after alumnus Robert G. Horsburgh (1914), the gymnasium opened May 24, 1957, being refurbished and physically incorporated into the Veale Center complex rededicated on April 22, 1998.

=== Adelbert Gymnasium ===
The original Adelbert Gymnasium was constructed in 1888, followed by the much larger armory expansion being erected between 1918 and 1919, dedicated on June 1, 1919. Originally built for use in World War I, the war ended before construction was finished, so it was used only for athletics. Basketball played there for over 50 years, ending during the 1969–1970 season. In 2013, the facility was upgraded with a refurbished playing court. Adelbert Gym is most commonly used for varsity athletic practice as well as intramural, club sport, and campus recreational functions. For variety athletics official contests, it is still used for heritage-type basketball games and wrestling matches.
