= 1937 Western Reserve Red Cats football team =

American college football season

1937 Western Reserve Red Cats football

Big Four champion
- Conference: Big Four Conference
- Record: 8–2 (3–0 Big Four)
- Head coach: Bill Edwards (3rd season)
- Home stadium: League Park

The 1937 Western Reserve Red Cats football team represented Western Reserve University, now known as Case Western Reserve University, during the 1937 college football seasonThe team was led by third-year head coach Bill Edwards, assisted by Gene Myslenski and Roy A. "Dugan" Miller. Notable players included Frank "Doc" Kelker, Phil Ragazzo, Albie Litwak, Mike Rodak, and Johnny Wilson.

The Red Cats went undefeated while at home. The loss to Dayton on October 30 ended a 28-game unbeaten streak stretching back to the 1934 season.

== Schedule ==
Date	Opponent	Site	Result	Attendance	Source
September 25	at Cincinnati*	Nippert Stadium; Cincinnati, OH	W 32–6	3,500	
October 2	Hillsdale*	League Park; Cleveland, OH	W 58–0	5,000	
October 9	Ohio*	League Park; Cleveland, OH	W 7–0	12,000	
October 16	Baldwin–Wallace	League Park; Cleveland, OH	W 21–7	13,000	
October 23	at Boston University*	Fenway Park; Boston, MA	W 7–0	5,000	
October 30	at Dayton*	Dayton Stadium; Dayton, OH	L 6–18	12,000	
November 6	at Syracuse*	Archbold Stadium; Syracuse, NY	L 6–27	17,000	
November 13	Ohio Wesleyan*	League Park; Cleveland, OH	W 41–13		
November 20	at John Carroll	Cleveland Municipal Stadium; Cleveland, OH	W 20–0	3,500	
November 25	Case	League Park; Cleveland, OH	W 6–0	17,000	
*Non-conference game
