= 1938 Western Reserve Red Cats football team =

American college football season

1938 Western Reserve Red Cats football

Big Four champion
- Conference: Big Four Conference
- Record: 9–0 (3–0 Big Four)
- Head coach: Bill Edwards (4th season)
- Home stadium: League Park

The 1938 Western Reserve Red Cats football team represented Western Reserve University, now known as Case Western Reserve University, during the 1938 college football season. The team was led by fourth-year head coach Bill Edwards, assisted by Gene Myslenski and Roy A. "Dugan" Miller. Notable players included Johnny Wilson, Mike Rodak, Steve Belichick, and Dick Booth. The team went undefeated and outscored opponents by a total of 259 to 31. Tackle Frank Crisci was selected as a second-team player on the 1938 Little All-America college football team.

== Schedule ==
Date	Opponent	Site	Result	Attendance	Source
September 24	Ohio Wesleyan*	Shaw Stadium; East Cleveland, OH	W 33–0	12,000	
October 1	at Youngstown*	Youngstown South High School; Youngstown, OH	W 33–0	11,000	
October 8	Ohio*	League Park; Cleveland, OH	W 26–14	12,000	
October 15	Baldwin–Wallace	League Park; Cleveland, OH	W 40–0	8,000	
October 22	at Cincinnati*	Nippert Stadium; Cincinnati, OH	W 33–0		
October 29	Boston University*	League Park; Cleveland, OH	W 47–6	12,000	
November 5	West Virginia*	League Park; Cleveland, OH	W 7–0	15,000	
November 12	John Carroll	League Park; Cleveland, OH	W 27–8	18,321	
November 24	Case	League Park; Cleveland, OH	W 13–3	10,000	
*Non-conference game
