= 1936 Western Reserve Red Cats football team =

American college football season

1936 Western Reserve Red Cats football

Big Four champion
- Conference: Big Four Conference
- Record: 10–0 (3–0 Big Four)
- Head coach: Bill Edwards (2nd season)
- Home stadium: League Park

The 1936 Western Reserve Red Cats football team represented Western Reserve University, now known as Case Western Reserve University, during the 1936 college football season. The team was led by second-year head coach Bill Edwards, assisted by Roy A. "Dugan" Miller and George Brown. Notable players included Frank "Doc" Kelker, Ray Zeh, Phil Ragazzo, Gene Myslenski, and Albie Litwak. The team went undefeated beating opponents by a combined 244–28, the defense posting six shutouts.

The annual Thanksgiving Day rivalry game against Case was postponed due to heavy snow.

== Schedule ==
Date	Opponent	Site	Result	Attendance	Source
September 19	vs. Findlay*	Harding Stadium; Warren, OH	W 59–0	4,000	
September 26	vs. Bowling Green*	Massillon Field; Massillon, OH	W 40–0	3,000	
October 3	at Akron*	Buchtel Field; Akron, OH	W 14–0	9,600	
October 10	Ohio Wesleyan*	League Park; Cleveland, OH	W 20–12	6,000	
October 17	Baldwin–Wallace	League Park; Cleveland, OH	W 20–6	18,000	
October 24	at Toledo*	Libbey Field Stadium; Toledo, OH	W 14–0	4,000	
October 31	at Dayton*	Dayton Stadium; Dayton, OH	W 19–7	5,000	
November 7	John Carroll	League Park; Cleveland, OH	W 19–0	7,500	
November 14	West Virginia*	League Park; Cleveland, OH	W 7–0	8,000	
December 5	Case	League Park; Cleveland, OH	W 32–3	15,000	
*Non-conference game
