= Edward L. Finnigan =

American football and basketball player and coach

Eddie Finnigan
Biographical details
- Born: May 10, 1911; Cleveland, Ohio, U.S.
- Died: July 10, 1968 (aged 57); Cleveland, Ohio, U.S.

Playing career

Football
- 1930–1932: Western Reserve
- Position: Quarterback

Coaching career (HC unless noted)

Football
- 1949–1950: Baldwin–Wallace
- 1951–1965: Western Reserve

Basketball
- 1935–1940: Baldwin–Wallace

Track
- 1940–1948: Baldwin–Wallace
- 1963–1966: Western Reserve

Golf
- 1954–1958: Western Reserve

Administrative career (AD unless noted)
- 1951–1968: Western Reserve

Head coaching record
- Overall: 66–54–9 (football); 25–56 (basketball)

Accomplishments and honors

Championships
- Football; 3 PAC (1955, 1958, 1960)

Edward Leo Finnigan (May 10, 1911 – July 10, 1968) was an American football and basketball coach and player. He served as the head football coach at Baldwin–Wallace College—now known as Baldwin Wallace University—from 1949 to 1950 and at Western Reserve University—now known as Case Western Reserve University—from 1951 to 1965, compiling a career college football coaching record of 68–52–9. Finnigan was also the head basketball coach at Baldwin–Wallace from 1935 to 1940, tallying a mark of 25–56.

== Playing career ==
In high school, Finnigan was a star athlete at John Adams High School in Cleveland.

Finnigan was the first Western Reserve University athlete to earn nine varsity letters—three each in football, basketball, and track—at a time when freshmen were unable to play varsity sports. He was football team captain and quarterback his senior year in 1932 leading the Red Cats to a 7–1 record.

His best sport was basketball, where he was an All-American during the 1932–33 season.

== Honors and death ==
In recognition of his many contributions to the athletic community, both the cities of Berea and Cleveland proclaimed November 4, 1967 as "Eddie Finnigan Day".

Finnegan died of cancer July 10, 1968, at the Cleveland Clinic.

Present day, the roadway in between DiSanto Field and Nobby's Ballpark is named "Finnegan's Way."

== Head coaching record ==
Year	Team	Overall	Conference	Standing	Bowl/playoffs
Baldwin–Wallace Yellow Jackets (Independent) (1949–1950)
1949	Baldwin–Wallace	6–2			
1950	Baldwin–Wallace	5–2–1			
Baldwin–Wallace:		11–4–1			
Western Reserve Red Cats (Mid-American Conference) (1951–1954)
1951	Western Reserve	2–6–1	1–3	5th	
1952	Western Reserve	5–4	1–4	T–6th	
1953	Western Reserve	5–3–1	1–2–1	5th	
1954	Western Reserve	3–4–1	2–3	6th	
Western Reserve Red Cats (Presidents' Athletic Conference) (1955–1965)
1955	Western Reserve	5–1–1	3–0	1st	
1956	Western Reserve	4–3	1–2	3rd	
1957	Western Reserve	2–4	1–2	3rd	
1958	Western Reserve	4–3	4–0	1st	
1959	Western Reserve	3–4	3–2	4th	
1960	Western Reserve	6–1	6–0	1st	
1961	Western Reserve	5–2	5–2	3rd	
1962	Western Reserve	3–3–1	3–2–1	3rd	
1963	Western Reserve	1–5–1	1–4–1	8th	
1964	Western Reserve	4–3–1	4–3–1	6th	
1965	Western Reserve	3–4–1	3–4–1	5th	
Western Reserve:		55–50–8	39–33–5		
Total:		66–54–9			
National championship Conference title Conference division title or championship game berth
