= Greg Debeljak =

American football player and coach (born 1965)

Current position
- Title: Head coach
- Team: Case Western Reserve
- Conference: PAC
- Record: 155–68–1

Biographical details
- Born: April 9, 1965 (age 61); Cleveland, Ohio, U.S.

Playing career
- 1985–1988: John Carroll
- Position: Defensive back

Coaching career (HC unless noted)
- 1988–1989: John Carroll (GA)
- 1990–1998: John Carroll (QB/WR)
- 1998–2000: John Carroll (OC)
- 2001–2003: Case Western Reserve (OC)
- 2004–present: Case Western Reserve

Head coaching record
- Overall: 155–68–1
- Tournaments: 2–5 (NCAA D-III playoffs)

Accomplishments and honors

Championships
- 6 UAA (2007–2009, 2011, 2016, 2017); 2 PAC (2017, 2019)

Awards
- 7x UAA Coaching Staff of the Year (2004, 2007–2009, 2011, 2016, 2017); PAC Coach of the Year (2017, 2019)

Greg Debeljak (born April 9, 1965) is an American college football coach and former player. He is the head football coach for Case Western Reserve University, a position he has held since 2004. Debeljak and his Spartans compete at the NCAA Division III level as a member of the Presidents' Athletic Conference and University Athletic Association.

== Playing career ==
Debeljak graduated from Mentor High School and earned his bachelor's degree from John Carroll University in Cleveland, Ohio. He was a two-sport athlete in college, competing on both the basketball and football teams. Debeljak played multiple positions for the Blue Streaks including defensive back, wide receiver and quarterback. He earned all-conference honors as a defensive back.

As a basketball player, Debeljak helped his team claim two Presidents' Athletic Conference titles. He also set the school record for most assists in a single game with 13.

== Assistant football coach ==
Debeljak spent two seasons as a graduate assistant for the Blue Streaks following his graduation in 1988. He then spent eight years as a quarterbacks and wide receivers coach before becoming the team's offensive coordinator in 1998. Most notably, he recruited Josh McDaniels. After 12 seasons as an assistant for John Carroll, Debeljak was hired as an offensive coordinator by the neighboring Case Western Reserve University in 2001.

With Debeljak as offensive coordinator, the Case Western Reserve Spartans saw their first "back-to-back-to-back" .500 seasons since 1986. The Spartans saw success in the national ratings as well finishing in the top tree for both total offense and passing offense in 2002.

In February 2004, head coach Joe Perella resigned after three seasons with the program. The university subsequently selected Debeljak as the new head coach of Case Western football.

== Head football coach ==
Debeljak was named head football coach at Case Western Reserve on March 24, 2004 after serving the previous three seasons as offensive coordinator for the program. Debeljak had a rough start in his early years at Case Western but found significant success in the seasons following 2006.

=== 2004 ===
In his first year as head coach, Debeljak led the Spartans to a 5–5 overall record and 2–1 mark in University Athletic Association (UAA) play. The Spartans played their home games at Brush High School's Korb Field in nearby Lyndhurst, Ohio while the DiSanto Field was under construction, which would be completed for the 2005 season.

=== 2007 ===
After a disappointing season the previous year, Debeljak and his team found success in 2007. The Spartans went undefeated in conference play and 11–1 overall with an appearance in the second Round of the NCAA Division III playoffs. The 2007 Case Western season ended with a 38–23 loss to the Wabash Little Giants. Debeljak was selected as one of five finalists for the NCAA Division III Liberty Mutual Coach of the Year Award in 2007.

=== 2008 ===
The Spartans carried their success into the 2008 campaign with an undefeated regular season and a second consecutive UAA Title. Debeljak's achievements earned him the "Lee Tressel Ohio College Coach of the Year Award" in 2008. He was again a finalist for the NCAA Division III Liberty Mutual Coach of the Year Award.

=== 2009 ===
The 2009 Case Western team saw continued success with another undefeated regular season and their third straight conference championship. The Spartants repeated their record of 10–1 from the previous season and lost in the first round of the NCAA Division III playoffs. Case Western Reserve ended their regular season with a seventh-place ranking in the final American Football Coaches Association (AFCA) regular season poll—their highest regular season finish under Debeljak. Debeljak was again selected as one of five finalists for the Liberty Mutual Coach of the Year Award.

=== 2010 ===
On October 30 2010, the Case Western Spartans lost to the Chicago Maroons at the University of Chicago's Stagg Field. This loss ended the Spartans' 38 game regular season winning streak going back to the final game of the 2006 campaign. The 2010 season ended on November 11 with a fourth straight win over rival Carnegie Mellon.

=== 2011 ===
The 2011 Case Western team ended with another win over Carnegie Mellon and a 9–1 overall record. The Spartans went undefeated in conference play and claimed their fourth UAA title in five years.

On December 13, 2011, after 27 years with the University Athletic Association, the Case Western Reserve Spartans announced they would join the Presidents' Athletic Conference (PAC) prior to the start of the 2014 season. Case Western Reserve was a founding member of the PAC in 1955 but left for the North Coast Athletic Conference in 1984. They joined the UAA two years later. Rival Carnegie Mellon announced they would also join the PAC with the Spartans.

=== 2014 ===
The Spartans went 3–7 overall with a last place finish in their inaugural season as a member of the PAC.

=== 2015 ===
In 2015, the Spartans improved upon their previous season by going 7–3 overall with a third-place finish in the Presidents' Athletic Conference. This was Debeljak's tenth top-three conference finish in his 12 seasons as a head coach.

=== 2016 ===
The Spartans finished 9–1 finishing 2nd in the PAC and sharing the UAA champion title at 2–1.

=== 2017 ===
The Spartans finished the regular season an undefeated 10–0, sharing the PAC conference title with 10–0 Washington & Jefferson. In its final season of play, the Spartans also won the UAA title at 2–0. Coach Debeljak recorded his 100th career win against Westminster during the ninth game of the season on November 4, 2017.

In the first round of the NCAA Division III playoffs, Debeljak's Spartans shut out the Illinois Wesleyan Titans 28–0 in a game that saw heavy snow. In the second round, the Spartans were soundly defeated by the Mount Union Purple Raiders 45–16.

=== 2018 ===
The Spartans ended the year 8–2 finishing 2nd in the PAC and 2nd in the UAA.

== Head coaching record ==
Year	Team	Overall	Conference	Standing	Bowl/playoffs
Case Western Reserve Spartans (University Athletic Association) (2004–2013)
2004	Case Western Reserve	5–5	2–1	2nd	
2005	Case Western Reserve	3–7	0–3	4th	
2006	Case Western Reserve	5–5	1–2	3rd	
2007	Case Western Reserve	11–1	3–0	1st	L NCAA Division III Second Round
2008	Case Western Reserve	10–1	3–0	1st	L NCAA Division III First Round
2009	Case Western Reserve	10–1	3–0	1st	L NCAA Division III First Round
2010	Case Western Reserve	8–2	1–2	3rd	
2011	Case Western Reserve	9–1	3–0	1st	
2012	Case Western Reserve	6–4	2–1	2nd	
2013	Case Western Reserve	5–4	2–1	2nd	
Case Western Reserve Spartans (Presidents' Athletic Conference) (2014–present)
2014	Case Western Reserve	3–7	3–5	T–7th	
2015	Case Western Reserve	7–3	6–2	T–3rd	
2016	Case Western Reserve	9–1	7–1	2nd	
2017	Case Western Reserve	11–1	8–0	T–1st	L NCAA Division III Second Round
2018	Case Western Reserve	8–2	7–2	2nd	
2019	Case Western Reserve	9–2	8–1	1st	L NCAA Division III First Round
2020–21	No team—COVID-19				
2021	Case Western Reserve	6–4	5–4	5th	
2022	Case Western Reserve	6–4	5–3	T–4th	
2023	Case Western Reserve	7–3	7–3	4th	
2024	Case Western Reserve	6–4	6–4	5th	
2025	Case Western Reserve	4–5–1	4–4	T–5th	
2026	Case Western Reserve	7–1	4–1		
Case Western Reserve:		155–68–1	90–40		
Total:		155–68–1			
National championship Conference title Conference division title or championship game berth
