= Mickey Sanzotta =

American football player (1921–1999)

- Sanzotta, c. 1942

No. 42, 18
- Position: Fullback

Personal information
- Born: April 28, 1921; Geneva, Ohio, U.S.
- Died: January 29, 1999 (aged 77); Geneva, Ohio, U.S.
- Listed height: 5 ft 9 in (1.75 m)
- Listed weight: 188 lb (85 kg)

Career information
- High school: Geneva
- College: Western Reserve (1938-1941)
- NFL draft: 1942: 4th round, 30th overall pick

Career history
- Detroit Lions (1942, 1946); Jacksonville Naval (1943)

Awards and highlights
- Detroit Lions leading rusher (1942)

Career NFL statistics
- Rushing yards: 340
- Rushing average: 4.4
- Receptions: 7
- Receiving yards: 35
- Stats at Pro Football Reference

Dominic Franklin "Mickey" Sanzotta (April 28, 1921 – January 21, 1999), sometimes known as "Dom" Sanzotta, was an American football player. He played college football for Western Reserve from 1938 to 1941 and professional football for the Detroit Lions in 1942 and 1946.

== Early life ==
Sanzotta was born in 1921 at Geneva, Ohio. In 1937, he was captain of the Geneva High School football team, scored 63 of the team's 120 points, and led the team to its first Lake Shore League championship in 30 years.

== Western Reserve ==
Sanzotta enrolled at Western Reserve University (now known as Case Western Reserve University) where he played college football from 1938 to 1941. He played halfback and was co-captain of the 1941 Western Reserve Red Cats football team. He helped lead Western Reserve to consecutive conference championships in 1940 and 1941 and a victory over Arizona in the 1941 Sun Bowl. He was selected as the most valuable player in the Big Four Conference for the 1941 season.

== Detroit Lions and Jacksonville Naval ==
Sanzotta was selected by the Detroit Lions in the fourth round (30th overall pick) in the 1942 NFL draft. He played for the Lions in 1942 and 1946. He was the Lions' leading rusher in 1942 with 268 rushing yards on 71 carries. He missed the 1943 to 1945 seasons while serving in the Navy during World War II. He played for the 1943 Jacksonville Naval Air Technical Training Center Air Raiders football team.

== Later life ==
In 1986, Sanzotta was inducted into the Case Western Reserve University Athletics Hall of Fame. He died in 1999 at age 77 in Geneva, Ohio.
