= Jim Chapman (American football) =

American football coach (1935–2019)

Biographical details
- Born: September 19, 1935; Marion, Ohio, U.S.
- Died: September 26, 2019 (aged 84); Monroe, North Carolina, U.S.

Coaching career (HC unless noted)
- 1960–1965: Anderson HS (OH) (RB)
- 1966–1967: Fairport HS (OH)
- 1968–1981: Willoughby South HS (OH)
- 1982–1986: Case Western Reserve
- 1987–1989: West Geauga HS (OH)
- 1990–1992: Mercyhurst

Head coaching record
- Overall: 47–23–2 (college); 101–35–6 (high school)

Accomplishments and honors

Championships
- 1 NCAC (1984)

Awards
- Ohio High School Football Coaches Association Hall of Fame (2010)

Jimmy Dale Chapman (September 19, 1935 – September 26, 2019) was an American football coach. He served as the head football coach at Case Western Reserve University from 1982 to 1986 and at Mercyhurst College—now known as Mercyhurst University—from 1990 to 1992, compiling a career college football coaching record of 47–23–2.

== Early years ==
Chapman graduated from Marion Harding High School in 1953, earning six combined letters in football, basketball, and baseball, including earning first-team all-Buckeye League as defensive back his senior season.

Chapman was a veteran of the United States Marine Corps and graduated Ohio University in 1960 with his bachelor's degree and University of Cincinnati in 1965 with his master's degree.

== Coaching ==
=== Willoughby South High School ===
At the high school level, he coached Willoughby South to a 101–35–6 (.732) record from 1968 to 1981, earning five Greater Cleveland Conference championships (1970, 1973, 1974, 1978 and 1980).

=== Case Western Reserve University ===
According to Sports Illustrated, Chapman's 1983 Christmas card to the players read: "9-0 and Number 1 in the NCAC and NCAA."

For the first time in 46 years, the Spartans went undefeated, winning the first ever North Coast Athletic Conference title during its inaugural season in 1984. Even though they defeated playoff team Washington and Jefferson 34–16 during the regular season, they were not invited to the 8-team 1984 NCAA Division III playoffs. The Spartans were led by two-time All-American quarterback Fred DiSanto and defensively by three-time All-American Ron Stepanovic.

Chapman achieved a record of 36–7–1 (.830) over his five seasons. He holds the highest winning percentage (.830) for any Spartans coach in school post-merger history, and is second all-time to only Coach Bill Edwards (.877), the College Football Hall of Fame coach from the Western Reserve Red Cats days.

== Honors and death ==
In 2010, Chapman was inducted into the Ohio High School Football Coaches Association Hall of Fame (OHSFCA).

Chapman died on September 26, 2019, in Monroe, North Carolina.

== Head coaching record ==
=== College ===
Year	Team	Overall	Conference	Standing	Bowl/playoffs
Case Western Reserve Spartans (Presidents' Athletic Conference) (1982–1983)
1982	Case Western Reserve	5–3	5–2	2nd	
1983	Case Western Reserve	8–1	6–1	2nd	
Case Western Reserve Spartans (North Coast Athletic Conference) (1984–1986)
1984	Case Western Reserve	9–0	6–0	1st	
1985	Case Western Reserve	7–2	5–1	2nd	
1986	Case Western Reserve	7–1–1	5–1	2nd	
Case Western Reserve:		36–7–1	27–5		
Mercyhurst Lakers (NCAA Division III independent) (1990–1992)
1990	Mercyhurst	1–8			
1991	Mercyhurst	5–4			
1992	Mercyhurst	5–4–1			
Mercyhurst:		11–16–1			
Total:		47–23–2			
National championship Conference title Conference division title or championship game berth
