= Case Western Reserve Spartans football =

Football team for Case Western Reserve University

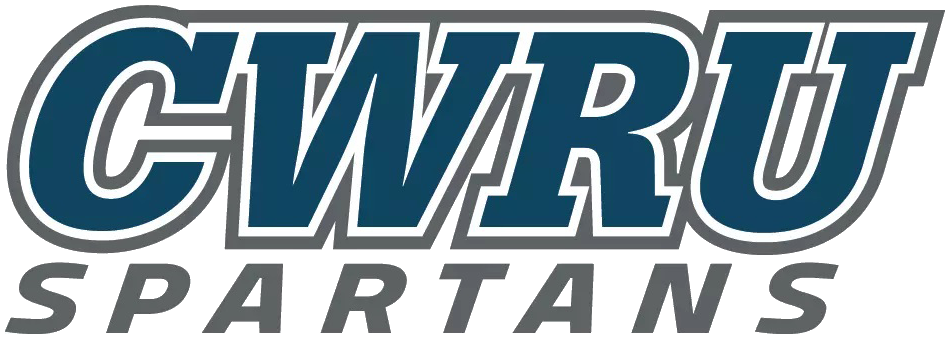
- First season: 1890; 136 years ago (Note: Originally two separated institutions, the Case football team played their first season in 1891; 135 years ago. The current team was formed in 1970; 56 years ago, by a merger between Western Reserve University and the Case Institute of Technology.)
- Head coach: Greg Debeljak; 21st season, 155–68–1 (.694)
- Location: Cleveland, Ohio, U.S.
- Stadium: DiSanto Field
- NCAA division: Division III
- Conference: PAC
- Colors: CWRU Blue, white, and gray
- Bowl record: 1–0 (1.000)

Conference championships
- 23
- Rivalries: Carnegie Mellon Tartans (rivalry)
- Fight song: Fight On
- Mascot: Spartie
- Outfitter: Nike
- Website: athletics.case.edu

The Case Western Reserve Spartans football team is the varsity intercollegiate football team representing Case Western Reserve University in Cleveland, Ohio. They compete in the National Collegiate Athletic Association (NCAA) at the Division III level and hold dual membership in both the Presidents' Athletic Conference (PAC) and the University Athletic Association (UAA). They are coached by Greg Debeljak. Home games are played at DiSanto Field. The team in its current form was created in 1970 after the federation of Western Reserve University and Case Institute of Technology.

== History ==
=== Pre-merger (1890–1969) ===
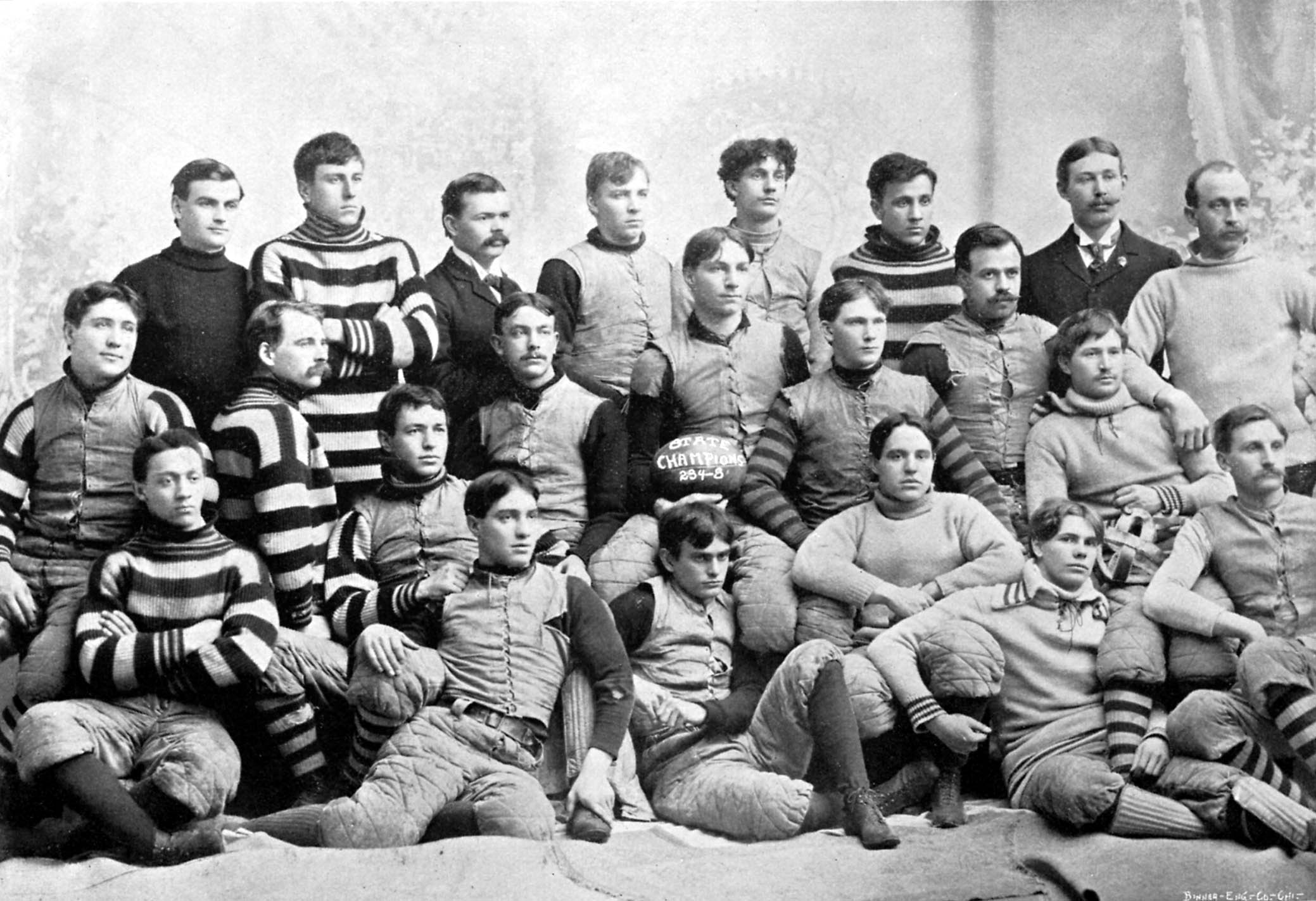
The undefeated 1894 Western Reserve football team, also showing the first player in football history holding a helmet, invented and patented by Clevelander Thomas W. Larwood.

Western Reserve played its first season in 1890 and Case began the following year in 1891. Physically bordering each other, the two schools became instant rivals. From 1894 to 1953, the rivalry game was played mostly on Thanksgiving Day, creating a Cleveland tradition. Due to high civic interest and large crowds, the games were often held at larger Cleveland city venues, such as League Park and Cleveland Municipal Stadium. Western Reserve led the all-time series 49–20–5.

In 1892, Western Reserve declined Clevelander John Heisman's offer to be their head coach, and then ironically faced him and his Oberlin Yeomen during the season opener, getting destroyed 38–8. Western Reserve would have their revenge two years later in 1894, finally defeating Heisman while at home in Cleveland, ending the season with a 7–0 undefeated record. In fact, the team outscored opponents a combined 232–8, and posted five shutouts. Only Oberlin and Ohio State scored on Western Reserve that year. Interestingly, the undefeated 1893 Case team handed coach John Heisman his first career loss after he started his coaching career with a 13–0 record.

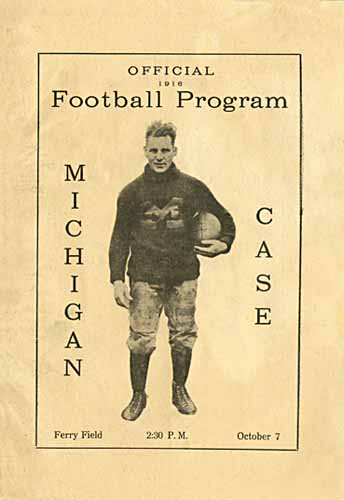
Michigan vs Case series occurred from 1894 to 1923, where Michigan hosted Case in sixteen home openers.

When the Ohio Athletic Conference was formed in 1902, Case dominated the early years winning its first four titles (1902–1905), posting a combined 18–1–1 league record, led by Chester Orr and Peggy Parratt, a quarterback who would later throw the first forward pass in professional football history. The 1902 team scored the first touchdown against Michigan's legendary coach Fielding H. Yost, who began his coaching career posting twelve consecutive shutouts. In fact, the headline in the Detroit Free Press referred not to Michigan's victory but instead read, "MICHIGAN'S GOAL LINE CROSSED." Western Reserve emerged to win league titles in both 1907 and 1908, and again in 1915. Finally in OAC play, Case would win two more titles—first in 1932, ironically losing only to Western Reserve who exited the conference in 1931—and another in 1941, again suffering their only loss to rival Western Reserve.

Western Reserve is the only Ohio team with a winning record, 6–5–1, against the Ohio State Buckeyes, playing from 1891 to 1934. Ohio State University's only death of a player from game-related injuries, team captain John Sigrist, occurred against Western Reserve in 1901. Case Tech holds a 10–11–2 all-time record against the Ohio State Buckeyes, with Coach Joe Fogg posting a perfect 4–0 record during his tenure.

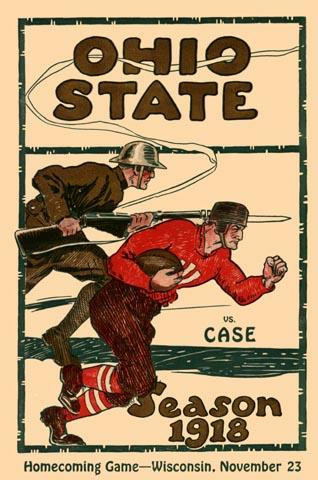
Ohio State vs Case, November 9, 1918. Military images were common on football programs during World War I

Famed Notre Dame coach, Knute Rockne, made his head coaching debut on September 28, 1918, against Case held at University Circle's Van Horn Field. George "The Gipper" Gipp led the Fighting Irish to a 26–6 victory rushing for two touchdowns. Although the home team could not play spoiler in his debut, Case lays claim to scoring the first touchdown against Rockne. The AP story recounted the scoring drive: "Case scored in the opening period when brilliant open field running by Hale and a forward pass, Hale to Wolf, placed the ball on Notre Dame's two-yard line. Capt. McCune plunged over."

In 1920, The Alabama Crimson Tide played their first ever game in the north at University Circle's Van Horn Field against Case, mainly due to coach Xen C. Scott, prior coach of both Case and Western Reserve, wanting to showcase his new team to the Cleveland audience.

Cleveland had its own Big Four Conference, which was formed in 1933 consisting of Baldwin-Wallace, Case Tech, John Carroll, and Western Reserve. Some of the highest attended games in school history occurred during this decade, needing to be played at Cleveland Municipal Stadium and League Park to handle the larger crowds. The champion received the Douglas S. Campbell Trophy. Case Tech won the inaugural in 1933 and then Western Reserve won eight out of the next nine—1934, 1935, 1936, 1937, 1938, 1940, 1941, and 1942. The local tradition came to an end due to the interruption of World War II.

The Bill Edwards era (1936–1941) propelled Western Reserve into the national spotlight, achieving three undefeated seasons (1935, 1936, and 1938), a 28-game win streak, and the school's only bowl game — 1941 Sun Bowl, played Jan 1, 1941. The undefeated teams featured strong play from Ray Zeh, Frank "Doc" Kelker, Phil Ragazzo, Albie Litwak, Johnny Ries, Gene Myslenski, Mike Rodak, Dick Booth, and Johnny Wilson. During the 1935 college football season, Ray Zeh led the nation in scoring with 112 points. Over his six-year tenure, Coach Edwards guided the team to a 49–6–2 (0.877) record, earning a spot in the College Football Hall of Fame before heading off to coach the Detroit Lions.

After a short hiatus during World War II, football resumed in 1946 where Western Reserve pushed hard to elevate the program to the national stage scheduling teams such as Pittsburgh, Cincinnati, Rutgers, West Virginia, Marshall, Kent State, Miami of Ohio, Ohio University, Western Michigan, Colgate, Brown, and Duquesne. In 1946, Western Reserve became a charter member with the formation of the Mid-American Conference, in conjunction with Ohio University, Butler, Cincinnati, and Wayne State. Ohio's first ever intercollegiate TV football game aired on October 23, 1948, where Western Reserve battled Kent State to a 14–14 tie.

In 1954, Western Reserve withdrew from the MAC, citing the need for the school to focus more energy on academics and the high cost of running a big time program spearheaded by President John S. Millis. In conjunction with reviving the Case Institute program who had disbanded in 1954, both teams helped form the Presidents' Athletic Conference as charter members in 1955, with Western Reserve winning conference titles in 1955, 1958, and 1960.

=== Post-merger (1970–present) ===
The football teams combined in 1970, a few years after the federation of the two universities. Both the Red Cats and Rough Riders names were dropped, and the new mascot, Spartans, was adopted. A new rivalry game emerged in 1970 against the Carnegie Mellon Tartans. In 1986, the annual game and trophy was officially dubbed the Academic Bowl. Another rivalry against the College of Wooster began in 1984, where the winner holds on to the Baird Brothers Trophy.

The Spartans played in the PAC until 1983. The following season, they helped charter their fourth conference, the North Coast Athletic Conference. During the league's first year in 1984, the Spartans achieved a 9–0 undefeated season, winning the first conference title led by two-time All-American quarterback Fred DiSanto. The most successful coach by winning percentage in the post-merger era was Coach Jim Chapman, who amassed a 36–7–1 (0.830) record from 1982 to 1986, including a 14-game win streak.

In conjunction with other top research universities in the country, Case Western Reserve University became a charter member of its fifth and final conference, the University Athletic Association, being joined by the football teams of University of Chicago, Washington University in St. Louis, Carnegie Mellon University, and University of Rochester in 1986. Conference titles were won in 1988 and 1996. The Spartans played as a member of both the NCAC and UAA, until finally departing the NCAC in 1999.

In 2004, Coach Greg Debeljak moved into the head coaching role, where he set and holds the record for most wins in post-merger era history. Within a few years, the Spartans achieved three consecutive 10–0 undefeated seasons in (2007, 2008, and 2009), which helped set an all-time school record of a 38-game regular season win streak, leading to the school's first NCAA DIII playoff appearances (2007, 2008, and 2009) and playoff win (2007). Six UAA conference titles (2007, 2008, 2009, 2011, 2016, and 2017) have been won. In 2017, he recorded another perfect 10–0 regular season, sharing the PAC conference title with Washington and Jefferson, also earning another playoff victory. Coach Greg Debeljak holds a 10–8 record against rival Carnegie Mellon.

After a couple decade hiatus, the team rejoined the PAC in 2014 while retaining its membership in the UAA.

=== Mascot names ===
Case, originally known as Case School of Applied Science, carried the name Scientists from 1918 to 1939. In 1940, the mascot was changed to the Rough Riders, in honor of their head coach Ray A. Ride. Case formally updated their school name in 1947 to Case Institute of Technology. Western Reserve originally used the mascot Pioneers from 1921 to 1927, until being forced to change by Marietta College, who claimed earlier usage of the namesake. The famous Red Cats mascot was then used beginning in 1928. Upon the merger of the two schools, the Spartans name was adopted in 1970, as the team is now known.

== Postseason and conference championships ==
=== Conference titles ===
A total of eleven undefeated seasons have been recorded—Western Reserve (1894, 1935, 1936, and 1938) and Case (1892, 1893) both while Independent and Case Western Reserve while in the NCAC or UAA (1984, 2007, 2008, 2009, and 2017).

A total of 23 conference titles have been earned—9 (OAC), 8 (UAA), 5 (PAC), and 1 (NCAC).

Year	Conference	Coach	Over.	Conf.	Winner	Postseason
1902	OAC	Joseph Wentworth	6–3	5–0	Case	
1903	OAC	Joseph Wentworth	8–1	5–0	Case	
1904	OAC	Joseph Wentworth	7–2	4–1	Case	
1905	OAC	Joseph Wentworth	8–1–1	4–0–1	Case	
1907	OAC	William B. Seaman	8–1	5–1	Western Reserve	
1908	OAC	William B. Seaman	9–1	6–1	Western Reserve	
1915	OAC	Walter D. Powell	7–2	6–1	Western Reserve	
1932	OAC	Ray Ride	7–2	6–0	Case	
1933	Big Four Conference	Ray Ride	5–3–1	1–1–1	Case	
1934	Big Four Conference	Sam Willaman	7–1–1	3–0	Western Reserve	
1935	Big Four Conference	Bill Edwards	9–0–1	3–0	Western Reserve	
1936	Big Four Conference	Bill Edwards	10–0	3–0	Western Reserve	
1937	Big Four Conference	Bill Edwards	8–2	3–0	Western Reserve	
1938	Big Four Conference	Bill Edwards	9–0	3–0	Western Reserve	
1940	Big Four Conference	Bill Edwards	8–1	3–0	Western Reserve	Won Sun Bowl
1941	OAC	Ray Ride	7–1	4–0	Case	
1941	Big Four Conference	Tom Davies	7–1	3–0	Western Reserve	
1942	Big Four Conference	Tom Davies	8–3	3–0	Western Reserve	
1955	PAC	Eddie Finnigan	5–1–1	3–0	Western Reserve	
1958	PAC	Eddie Finnigan	4–1	4–0	Western Reserve	
1960	PAC	Eddie Finnigan	6–1	6–0	Western Reserve	
1984	NCAC	Jim Chapman	9–0	6–0	Case Western Reserve	
1988	UAA	Ronald Stuckey	7–3	2–0	Case Western Reserve	
1996	UAA	Regis Scafe	5–5	3–1	Case Western Reserve	
2007	UAA	Greg Debeljak	11–1	3–0	Case Western Reserve	Won vs Widener, Loss vs Wabash
2008	UAA	Greg Debeljak	10–1	3–0	Case Western Reserve	Loss vs Wabash
2009	UAA	Greg Debeljak	10–1	3–0	Case Western Reserve	Loss vs Trine
2011	UAA	Greg Debeljak	9–1	3–0	Case Western Reserve	
2016	UAA	Greg Debeljak	9–1	2–1	Case Western Reserve	
2017	PAC & UAA	Greg Debeljak	11–1	8–0 & 3–0	Case Western Reserve	Won vs Illinois Wesleyan, Loss vs Mount Union
2019	PAC	Greg Debeljak	9–2	8–1	Case Western Reserve	Loss vs Union

=== 1941 Sun Bowl ===
Arguably the most significant game in school history was played between Western Reserve University and Arizona State University in the 1941 Sun Bowl. For the Red Cats, Steve Belichick, father of NFL coach Bill Belichick, scored the first touchdown. Johnny Ries led the Red Cats offense with two rushing touchdowns. Four other future NFL players played in the game for Western Reserve, Dom "Mickey" Sanzotta, Stan Skoczen, Dick Booth, and Andy Logan. This would become both the only bowl game played and won in school history, ending in a 26–13 victory.

=== NCAA Division III playoffs ===
The Spartans reached the playoffs during the 2007, 2008, and 2009 seasons, led by quarterback Dan Whalen. The lone playoff victory during this stretch occurred in 2007, with a thrilling 21–20 victory over Widener University

In the first round of the 2017 playoffs, the Spartans traveled to and shut out Illinois Wesleyan 28–0. In the second round, they were defeated by 45–16 by Mount Union.

== Conference affiliation ==
Founding charter members of five conferences:

- Ohio Athletic Conference (OAC), 1902 (Case Tech and Western Reserve)
- Mid-American Conference (MAC), 1946 (Western Reserve)
- Presidents' Athletic Conference (PAC), 1955 (Case Tech and Western Reserve)
- North Coast Athletic Conference (NCAC), 1984 (Case Western Reserve)
- University Athletic Association (UAA), 1986 (Case Western Reserve)

Western Reserve University Case Tech Case Western Reserve University

== Notable affiliates and alumni ==
Notable Case Western Reserve Spartans football affiliates
Name	Notability
Steve Belichick	Father of Bill Belichick
Tom Davies	College Football Hall of Fame inductee (1970)
Bill Edwards	College Football Hall of Fame inductee coach and former NFL head coach of the Detroit Lions
Frank "Doc" Kelker	African American All-American unable to play professional football due to existing color barrier
Ray Mack (Mlckovsky)	Drafted in the 1938 NFL draft by the Chicago Bears (Round 11, Pick 100), but declined in order to play Major League Baseball
Gordon McCarter	NFL official 1967–1995
Frank Ryan	Cleveland Browns quarterback 1962–1968
Frank Ryan	Assistant Professor of Mathematics at Case 1967–1971
Lou Saban	Former NFL head coach of the New England Patriots, Buffalo Bills, and Denver Broncos
Mike Scarry	NFL and AAFC center for Cleveland Rams and Cleveland Browns
Jerry Schuplinski	Quarterbacks coach for the Houston Texans.
Xen C. Scott	Captain of 1904 Western Reserve Football. Assistant coach of Western Reserve football 1906–1909. Head football coach 1910 Western Reserve. Head football coach of Penn State University (1917) and University of Alabama (1919–1922)
Dan Whalen	
Charley Winner	Former NFL head coach of the New York Jets and St. Louis Cardinals
Tommy Zagorski	Offensive Coordinator for the Akron Zips

== Former NFL players ==
NFL and earlier professional players and/or draftees who played for Case Western Reserve
Name	First season	Last season	Notes
Johnny Badaczewski	1946	1953	
Steve Belichick	1941		
Dick Booth	1941	1945	
Hal "Candy" Carroll			Drafted in the 1956 NFL draft by the Cleveland Browns
Frank Civiletto	1923		
Ken Fryer	1944		
Erwin Grabisna			Drafted in the 1988 NFL draft by the Raiders (Round 6, Pick 143). Arena Football League champion (1992)
Billy Gribben	1926		
Ed Kagy	1912	1917	
Roger "Red" Kirkman	1933	1935	
Bill Laub	1902	1905	First head coach of the Canton Bulldogs, former mayor of Akron
Warren Lahr	1949	1959	Pro Bowl, All-Pro, NFL Champion (3X), AAFC Champion
Bob Linn			Drafted in the 1952 NFL draft by the Washington Redskins
Andy Logan	1941		
Bill Lund	1946	1947	AAFC Champion (2X)
Peggy Parratt	1905	1916	Credited for throwing the first legal forward pass in professional football history
Milton "Muff" Portmann	1911	1916	
Phil Ragazzo	1938	1947	
Mike Rodak	1939	1942	
George Roman	1948	1950	
Dom "Mickey" Sanzotta	1942	1946	
Stan Skoczen	1944		
E. J. "Doc" Stewart	1903	1906	
Saul Weinberg	1923		
Del Wertz	1912	1914	
Johnny Wilson	1939	1942	
