= 1984 Case Western Reserve Spartans football team =

American college football season

1984 Case Western Reserve Spartans football

NCAC champion
- Conference: North Coast Athletic Conference
- Record: 9–0 (6–0 NCAC)
- Head coach: Jim Chapman (3rd season)

1984 North Coast Athletic Conference football standings
	Conf.					Overall
Team	W		L		T	W		L		T
Case Western Reserve $	6	–	0	–	0	9	–	0	–	0
Denison	4	–	2	–	0	8	–	2	–	0
Kenyon	4	–	2	–	0	7	–	3	–	0
Oberlin	3	–	3	–	0	4	–	6	–	0
Ohio Wesleyan	3	–	3	–	0	3	–	6	–	0
Allegheny	1	–	5	–	0	3	–	7	–	0
Wooster	0	–	6	–	0	0	–	9	–	0
$ – Conference champion

The 1984 Case Western Reserve Spartans football team represented Case Western Reserve University in the American city of Cleveland, Ohio, during 1984 NCAA Division III football season. The team's coach was Jim Chapman.

For the first time in 46 years, the Spartans went undefeated, winning the first ever North Coast Athletic Conference title during its inaugural season. Even though they defeated playoff team Washington & Jefferson 34–16 during the regular season, they were not invited to the 8-team 1984 NCAA Division III playoffs. The Spartans were led by two-time All-American quarterback Fred DiSanto and defensively by three-time All-American Ron Stepanovic.

The team won the inaugural Baird Brothers Trophy rivalry game, defeating Wooster Fighting Scots 21–14.
