= 1935 Western Reserve Red Cats football team =

American college football season

1935 Western Reserve Red Cats football

Big Four champion
- Conference: Big Four Conference
- Record: 9–0–1 (3–0 Big Four)
- Head coach: Bill Edwards (1st season)
- Home stadium: League Park

The 1935 Western Reserve Red Cats football team represented Western Reserve University, now known as Case Western Reserve University, during the 1935 college football season. The team was led by first-year head coach Bill Edwards, who was assisted by Cyril Surington and George Brown. Notable players included Frank "Doc" Kelker, Ray Zeh, George "Puck" Burgeon, Gene Myslenski, and Phil Ragazzo. The Red Cats went undefeated while at home.

Ray Zeh led college football in scoring during the 1935 season with 112 points.

== Schedule ==
Date	Opponent	Site	Result	Attendance	Source
September 27	Hillsdale*	Cleveland Heights High School Stadium; Cleveland Heights, OH	W 26–0	1,500	
October 5	at Cornell*	Schoellkopf Field; Ithaca, NY	W 33–19	4,500	
October 12	Buffalo*	League Park; Cleveland, OH	W 60–0	6,000	
October 19	Baldwin–Wallace	League Park; Cleveland, OH	W 27–14	25,000	
October 25	at Findlay*	Donnell Stadium; Findlay, OH	W 27–7	5,000	
November 1	at John Carroll	Cleveland Municipal Stadium; Cleveland, OH	W 37–13	6,000	
November 9	at Ohio Wesleyan*	Selby Field; Delaware, OH	T 7–7		
November 16	Denison*	League Park; Cleveland, OH	W 38–0	6,000	
November 23	at Oberlin*	Dill Field; Oberlin, OH	W 40–0		
November 28	Case	League Park; Cleveland, OH	W 6–0	10,000	
*Non-conference game
