= Xen C. Scott =

American football player and sports coach (1882–1924)

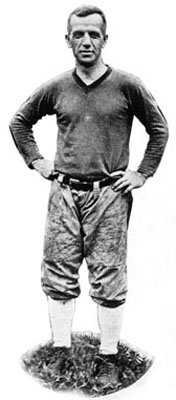

Biographical details
- Born: July 6, 1882; Pasadena, California, U.S.
- Died: April 21, 1924 (aged 41); Cleveland, Ohio, U.S.

Playing career

Football
- c. 1904: Western Reserve
- ?: Massillon Tigers
- Positions: End, quarterback

Coaching career (HC unless noted)

Football
- 1906–1909: Western Reserve (assistant)
- 1910: Western Reserve
- 1911–1913: Case
- 1917: Penn State (head field coach)
- 1918: Cleveland Naval Reserve
- 1919–1922: Alabama

Basketball
- 1910: Nebraska State Normal

Baseball
- 1910: Nebraska State Normal

Head coaching record
- Overall: 49–26–4 (football); 7–1 (men's basketball); 1–3–1 (women's basketball); 11–1 (baseball)

Xenophon Cole "Xen" Scott (July 6, 1882 – April 21, 1924) was an American football player, coach of football, basketball, and baseball, and a sportswriter. He served as the head football coach at Western Reserve University in 1910, at the Case School of Applied Science from 1911 to 1913—both Western Reserve and Case are now part of Case Western Reserve University—and at the University of Alabama from 1919 to 1922, compiling a career college football record of 49–26–4.

Born in Pasadena, California in 1882, Scott moved to Cleveland, Ohio with his family when he was four. He played college football as an end and quarterback at Western Reserve, from which he graduated in 1905, and then professionally with the Massillon Tigers.

Prior to being hired as head football coach, Scott was a horse-racing writer in Cleveland. He also contributed material to the Spalding's Official Foot Ball Guide in 1907 and 1908. In 1907 he became an assistant coach at Western Reserve University in Cleveland, often attributed as a key reason for the success of the 1907 and 1908 Western Reserve teams. After the unexpected death of Western Reserve head coach William B. Seaman, Scott began his head coaching career at Western Reserve for the 1910 football season.

In 1910, Scott was hired to be head coach at the Nebraska State Normal School in Peru, Nebraska, where he also coached baseball and basketball. He compiled a 29–9–3 (.744) record at Alabama. His first Tide team went 8–1 to set a school record for victories in a season; his second team did better, going 10–1 and finishing atop the standings of the Southern Intercollegiate Athletic Association.

Scott recruited Joe Sewell to Alabama and then sent him to the Cleveland Indians when Sewell's football days were over; Joe Sewell went to the Baseball Hall of Fame. Scott's Tide scored 110 points against Marion Institution in 1922, an Alabama football record which still stands today.

In 1922, Scott's Tide beat Penn, 9–7, a shocking upset at the time and one which heralded the arrival of Alabama as a national football power. However, Scott did not get to enjoy his success; a case of cancer of the mouth and tongue forced his resignation after the 1922 season and he died in 1924, in Cleveland, at age 41.

== Head coaching record ==
=== Football ===
Year	Team	Overall	Conference	Standing	Bowl/playoffs
Western Reserve (Ohio Athletic Conference) (1910)
1910	Western Reserve	5–4	4–3	5th	
Western Reserve:		5–4	4–3		
Case (Ohio Athletic Conference) (1911–1913)
1911	Case	6–2–1	5–1–1	2nd	
1912	Case	4–6	3–3	T–5th	
1913	Case	5–5	3–3	T–7th	
Case:		15–13–1	11–7–1		
Alabama Crimson Tide (Southern Intercollegiate Athletic Association) (1919–1921)
1919	Alabama	8–1	6–1	3rd	
1920	Alabama	10–1	6–1	4th	
1921	Alabama	5–4–2	2–4–2	18th	
Alabama Crimson Tide (Southern Conference) (1922)
1922	Alabama	6–3–1	3–2–1	8th	
Alabama:		29–9–3	17–8–3		
Total:		49–26–4			
