= Regis Scafe =

American football coach (born c. 1948)

Biographical details
- Born: c. 1948 (age 77–78)
- Education: Case Western Reserve University (1971); Cleveland State University (1983)

Playing career
- 1967–1970: Case Western Reserve
- Position: Defensive back

Coaching career (HC unless noted)
- 1972–1977: St. Peter Chanel HS (OH) (assistant)
- 1978–1986: St. Peter Chanel HS (OH)
- 1987–1993: John Carroll (AHC/DC)
- 1994–1998: Case Western Reserve
- 1999–2012: John Carroll
- 2013: Notre Dame (OH) (LB)
- 2015–2017: Thomas More
- 2019–2023: St. Thomas (FL) (DB)

Head coaching record
- Overall: 130–94 (college)
- Tournaments: 5–3 (NCAA D-III playoffs)

Accomplishments and honors

Championships
- 2 PAC (2015–2016)

Regis D. Scafe (born c. 1948) is an American college football coach. He was the head football coach for St. Peter Chanel High School from 1978 to 1986, Case Western Reserve University from 1994 to 1998, John Carroll University from 1999 to 2012, and Thomas More College—now known as Thomas More University—from 2015 to 2017. He also coached for Notre Dame (OH) and St. Thomas (FL). He played college football for Case Western Reserve as a defensive back.

== Head coaching record ==
=== College ===
Year	Team	Overall	Conference	Standing	Bowl/playoffs	D3^{#}
Case Western Reserve Spartans (North Coast Athletic Conference) (1994–1998)
1994	Case Western Reserve	1–9	1–5	7th		
1995	Case Western Reserve	2–8	1–5	8th		
1996	Case Western Reserve	5–5	2–4	7th		
1997	Case Western Reserve	3–7	2–4	7th		
1998	Case Western Reserve	5–5	4–2	4th		
Case Western Reserve:		16–34	10–20			
John Carroll Blue Streaks (Ohio Athletic Conference) (1999–2012)
1999	John Carroll	7–3	6–3	T–3rd		
2000	John Carroll	7–3	6–3	4th		
2001	John Carroll	7–3	6–3	T–3rd		
2002	John Carroll	12–2	8–1	2nd	L NCAA Division III Semifinal	
2003	John Carroll	7–3	6–3	4th		
2004	John Carroll	6–4	6–3	T–3rd		
2005	John Carroll	7–3	6–3	T–4th		
2006	John Carroll	5–5	5–4	T–4th		
2007	John Carroll	6–4	5–4	T–4th		
2008	John Carroll	5–5	4–5	T–5th		
2009	John Carroll	3–7	3–6	T–6th		
2010	John Carroll	5–5	5–4	T–4th		
2011	John Carroll	5–5	5–4	T–4th		
2012	John Carroll	6–4	5–4	5th		
John Carroll:		88–56	76–50			
Thomas More Saints (Presidents' Athletic Conference) (2015–2017)
2015	Thomas More	11–1	8–0	1st	L NCAA Division III Second Round	11
2016	Thomas More	9–2	8–0	1st	L NCAA Division III Second Round	18
2017	Thomas More	6–4	5–3	T–4th		
Thomas More:		26–7	21–3			
Total:		130–94				
National championship Conference title Conference division title or championship game berth
