= 1940 Western Reserve Red Cats football team =

American college football season

1940 Western Reserve Red Cats football

Big Four champion

Sun Bowl, W 26–13 vs. Arizona State
- Conference: Big Four Conference
- Record: 8–1 (3–0 Big Four)
- Head coach: Bill Edwards (6th season)
- Home stadium: Cleveland Stadium, League Park

1940 Big Four Conference (Ohio) football standings
	Conf.					Overall
Team	W		L		T	W		L		T
Western Reserve $	3	–	0	–	0	8	–	1	–	0
Case	2	–	1	–	0	6	–	2	–	0
Baldwin–Wallace	1	–	2	–	0	4	–	4	–	0
John Carroll	0	–	3	–	0	2	–	6	–	0
$ – Conference champion

The 1940 Western Reserve Red Cats football team represented the Western Reserve University—later merged into Case Western Reserve University—as a member of the Big Four Conference during the 1940 college football season. Led by Bill Edwards in his sixth and final season as head coach, the Red Cats compiled an overall record of 8–1 with a mark of 3–0 in conference play, winning the Big Four title. Western Reserve concluded the season with a win in the Sun Bowl over Arizona State. The team played home games at Cleveland Stadium and League Park in Cleveland.

Edwards was assisted by Gene Myslenski and Roy A. "Dugan" Miller. Notable players included Johnny Reis, Andy Logan, Stan Skoczen , Steve Belichick, Mickey Sanzotta and Dick Booth. The season opener against the Akron was the first game played at the Rubber Bowl. Western Reserve was ranked at No. 113 (out of 697 college football teams) in the final rankings under the Litkenhous Difference by Score system for 1940.

== Schedule ==
Date	Time	Opponent	Site	Result	Attendance	Source
October 4	8:15 p.m.	at Akron*	Rubber Bowl; Akron, OH	W 6–0	20,000	
October 12	3:00 p.m.	at Dayton*	University of Dayton Stadium; Dayton, OH	L 12–20	4,300	
October 19	2:00 p.m.	Baldwin–Wallace	Cleveland Stadium; Cleveland, OH	W 2–0	2,500–3,000	
October 26	2:00 p.m.	Miami (OH)*	League Park; Cleveland, OH	W 47–6	3,000	
November 2	2:00 p.m.	Boston University*	League Park; Cleveland, OH	W 19–0	3,500	
November 9	2:00 p.m.	Ohio*	League Park; Cleveland, OH	W 6–0	7,500–9,000	
November 16	2:00 p.m.	at John Carroll	League Park; Cleveland, OH	W 12–0	3,000	
November 21	10:30 a.m.	Case	League Park; Cleveland, OH	W 15–14	15,000	
January 1		vs. Arizona State*	Kidd Field; El Paso, TX (Sun Bowl)	W 26–13	12,000	
*Non-conference game; All times are in Eastern time
