= Johnny Wilson (American football, born 1915) =

American football player (1915–2002)

Profile
- Position: End

Personal information
- Born: November 2, 1915; Dover, Ohio, U.S.
- Died: August 24, 2002 (aged 86); Rawlings, Maryland, U.S.
- Listed height: 6 ft 3 in (1.91 m)
- Listed weight: 203 lb (92 kg)

Career information
- High school: Stuebenville, OH
- College: Western Reserve

Career history
- Cleveland Rams (1939–1942)

Career statistics
- Receiving yards: 429
- Receiving Touchdowns: 4

John S. "Long John" Wilson (November 2, 1915 – August 24, 2002) was an American football player.

Wilson, born in Dover, Ohio, played high school football for the Steubenville Big Red where we earned All-Ohio status. He then played his college football for the Western Reserve Red Cats, present-day Case Western Reserve University, from 1935 – 1938 where he greatly contributed to a number of undefeated teams under Coach Bill Edwards. His combined collegiate record was 36-2-1.

Wilson played four seasons in the National Football League (NFL) for the Cleveland Rams from 1939 – 1942.
