= Steve Belichick =

American football coach and scout (1919–2005)

- Belichick in Yackety Yack 1954, University of North Carolina yearbook

Biographical details
- Born: January 7, 1919; Monessen, Pennsylvania, U.S.
- Died: November 19, 2005 (aged 86); Annapolis, Maryland, U.S.

Playing career

Football
- 1938–1940: Western Reserve
- 1941: Detroit Lions
- 1942: Great Lakes Navy
- Position: Fullback

Coaching career (HC unless noted)

Football
- 1946–1948: Hiram
- 1949–1952: Vanderbilt (backfield)
- 1953–1955: North Carolina (backfield)
- 1956–1989: Navy (backfield/scout)

Basketball
- 1946–1949: Hiram

Head coaching record
- Overall: 8–12–2 (football); 24–29 (basketball)

Accomplishments and honors

Awards
- Case Western Reserve Hall of Fame (1976)

Stephen Nickolas Belichick (January 7, 1919 – November 19, 2005) was an American football player, coach, and scout. He played college football at Western Reserve University, now part of Case Western Reserve University, from 1938 to 1940 and then in the National Football League (NFL) with the Detroit Lions in 1941. After serving in the United States Navy during World War II, he was the head football and basketball coach at Hiram College from 1946 to 1949. He then became an assistant coach at Vanderbilt University (1949–1952), the University of North Carolina at Chapel Hill (1953–1955), and the United States Naval Academy (1956–1989), where he spent 34 years, primarily as a scout. His 1962 book Football Scouting Methods became a standard work on the subject.

Belichick's son, Bill, won six Super Bowls as head coach of the NFL's New England Patriots and became head coach of the North Carolina Tar Heels in 2025, the program where his father had been an assistant from 1953 to 1955. Two of Bill's sons, Stephen and Brian, also became coaches and served on their father's staffs with the Patriots and at North Carolina.

== Playing career ==
After graduation from Struthers High School in Struthers, Ohio, Belichick played college football at Western Reserve University in Cleveland, now known as Case Western Reserve University, where he played at fullback on the Red Cats squad. Most notably, he was a member of the 1938 team, which went a perfect 9–0, and the bowl-qualifying 1940 team, where he scored several touchdowns in his senior season. During the school's first and only bowl game, the 1941 Sun Bowl victory over Arizona State, he scored the first touchdown of the game.

After graduation, he worked as an equipment manager for the Detroit Lions of the National Football League (NFL). The team was struggling, and Belichick reportedly told the coach, Bill Edwards, "I can do better than most of the guys you've got." Edwards, who had coached Belichick at Western Reserve, agreed, and signed him as a player. Although the team's fortunes did not improve, Belichick had some success, scoring a 65-yard punt return touchdown in a loss against the New York Giants.

== Military service ==
After the 1941 season, Belichick enlisted in the United States Navy and trained at Naval Station Great Lakes near Chicago. He played for the 1942 Great Lakes Navy Bluejackets football team and helped coach the team in 1943. He later became an officer and served in both Europe and the Pacific during World War II.

== Coaching and scouting career ==
After the war, Belichick became the head coach at Hiram College, southeast of Cleveland, in 1946. In 1949, he left Hiram to become the backfield coach at Vanderbilt University, where he spent four seasons before joining the University of North Carolina as an assistant to George Barclay in 1953. At both schools he worked with Bill Edwards, who had coached him at Western Reserve and with the Lions; Edwards was Vanderbilt's head coach from 1949 to 1952 and then joined Barclay's North Carolina staff.

In 1956, Belichick joined the United States Naval Academy staff under Eddie Erdelatz, where he served primarily as a scout for over 30 years. Belichick's book Football Scouting Methods (Ronald Press, 1962) became a standard, described by Charley Casserly as the best book on the subject he had read, and by Bleacher Report as the "Bible" of football scouting.

In 1982, Nick Saban joined the Navy staff as the defensive backs coach. That summer, Belichick introduced Saban to his son, Bill, over dinner at the Belichick home in Annapolis, beginning a friendship that led Bill to hire Saban as his defensive coordinator with the Cleveland Browns in 1991.

== Personal life ==
Steve Belichick was the youngest of five children born to Marija Barković and Ivan Biličić, who immigrated to the United States in 1897 from Draganić, Karlovac, Croatia and settled in Monessen, Pennsylvania. After their marriage, the couple changed their names legally to Mary and John Belichick, reportedly at the suggestion of Immigration Center. In 1924, the family moved to Struthers, Ohio, where Steve Belichick maintained strong ties with the local Croatian community. In 1951, he married Jeannette Ruth Munn, with whom he had one child, Bill. Their son is the former head coach of the New England Patriots and has cited his father, with whom he began analyzing game film at the age of 10, as his chief early influence.

== Legacy ==
Belichick was inducted into the Case Western Reserve University Athletics Hall of Fame for both football and basketball in 1976.

The Belichick Library on the campus of the United States Naval Academy was principally donated by Steve Belichick, and consists of books on football strategy and history, as well as Navy Football memorabilia. His son has contributed to it in recent years, and it is considered one of the largest collections of football-related works outside of the Pro Football Hall of Fame.

The Steve Belichick Varsity Weight Room of the Case Western Reserve Spartans football team is located inside the Wyant Field House at DiSanto Field in Cleveland. The 4,500-square-foot facility was constructed in 2013, funded in part by a donation from son Bill.

In 2019, Struthers High School named its outdoor athletic facilities the Steve Belichick Complex.

== Head coaching record ==
=== Football ===
Year	Team	Overall	Conference	Standing	Bowl/playoffs
Hiram Terriers (Independent) (1946–1948)
1946	Hiram	5–3			
1947	Hiram	2–4–1			
1948	Hiram	1–5–1			
Hiram:		8–12–2			
Total:		8–12–2			
