= Ray Zeh =

American football player (1914–2003)

Western Reserve Red Cats
- Positions: Quarterback; Kicker

Personal information
- Born: October 22, 1914
- Died: December 23, 2003 (aged 89); Downers Grove, Illinois, U.S.

Career information
- High school: Collinwood (OH) (1930–1933)
- College: Western Reserve (1934–1936)

Raymond Fredrick Zeh (October 22, 1914 – December 23, 2003) was an American football quarterback and kicker who played college football for Western Reserve University—now known as Case Western Reserve University—from 1934 to 1936. During the 1935 season, he led college football in scoring with 112 points. Western Reserve has a combined record of 26–1–2 during his Zeh's three on the team, with the only loss coming against the Ohio State Buckeyes in 1934.

Zeh graduated from Collinwood High School in Cleveland in 1933. He was a member of Phi Gamma Delta fraternity while at Western Reserve. Zeh married Evelyn M. Anderson, 1938 grad of Mather College, and together had a son named Raymond Zeh, Jr., born in 1944.

Zeh is buried at Clarendon Hills Cemetery, located in Darien, Illinois.
