= Mike Rodak =

American football player (1917–1980)

Profile
- Position: Halfback/Guard

Personal information
- Born: February 11, 1917; Orient, Pennsylvania, U.S.
- Died: December 31, 1980 (aged 63)
- Listed height: 5 ft 10 in (1.78 m)
- Listed weight: 194 lb (88 kg)

Career information
- High school: Weirton, WV
- College: Western Reserve

Career history
- Cleveland Rams (1939–1940); Detroit Lions (1941) (Injured Reserve); Pittsburgh Steelers (1942)

Michael Rodak (February 11, 1917 – December 31, 1980) was an American football player.

Rodak, born in Orient, PA, played high school football for the Weir High School in Weirton, WV. He then played his college football at Western Reserve from 1935 – 1938 where he greatly contributed to a number of undefeated teams under Coach Bill Edwards. His combined collegiate record was 36-2-1.

Rodak played in the National Football League (NFL), two for the Cleveland Rams from 1939 and 1940, and one with the Pittsburgh Steelers in 1942. He was a member of the Detroit Lions in 1941, but missed the entire season due to a broken ankle suffered before the season.

During World War II, Rodak was a paratrooper with the 187th Infantry Regiment of 11th Airborne Division in the Pacific theater. After the war, Rodak became the player-coach of the 11th Airborne Division football team. His team won the Pacific Championship going undefeated. He was discharged in 1946.

In 1947, Rodak coached the Weirton Independent Union "Weiriters" semi-pro football team, earning a record of 9-1, and winning the Tri-State Area championship. He coached at Weir High School from 1948-1950, before ending up at Mingo High School for the remainder of his career.
