= Joseph Wentworth =

American football player, coach, and lawyer (1877–1944)

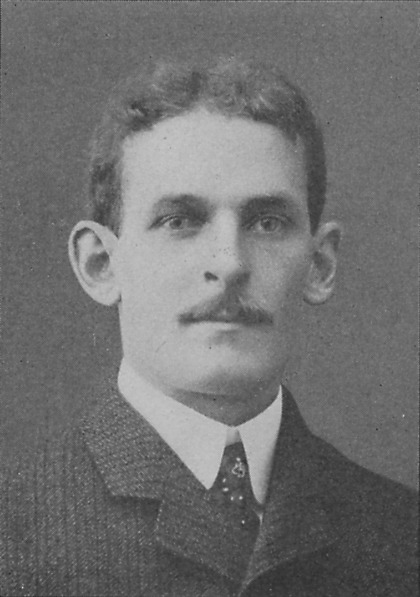

Biographical details
- Born: January 29, 1877; Sandwich, New Hampshire, U.S.
- Died: April 7, 1944 (aged 67); Boston, Massachusetts, U.S.
- Education: Dartmouth; Harvard Law School

Playing career

Football
- 1896–1899: Dartmouth

Baseball
- 1899-1900: Dartmouth
- Position: Quarterback

Coaching career (HC unless noted)

Football
- 1900–1901: Kenyon
- 1902–1906: Case

Head coaching record
- Overall: 46–15–3

Accomplishments and honors

Championships
- 4 OAC (1902–1905)

Joseph "Little Joe" Wentworth (January 29, 1877 – April 7, 1944) was an American college football player, coach, and lawyer.

Wentworth was born January 29, 1877, in Sandwich, New Hampshire, to Paul and Ellen Tilton (Dunklee) Wentworth. Wentworth attended the Holderness School from 1890 to 1896 and Phillips Academy Andover from 1893 to 1896. For his undergraduate career, he attended Dartmouth College, graduating in 1900. He was a member of the Sphinx, a Dartmouth secret society, and Alpha Delta Phi fraternity. Wentworth graduated from Harvard Law School in 1903, and spent most of his professional career with the law firm Choate, Hall & Stewart in Boston.

== Playing career ==
As a collegiate athlete, he played football at Dartmouth as a quarterback. He captained the freshmen team in 1896 and played varsity from 1897 to 1899. Wentworth captained the varsity team his final season in 1899. He was a member of the varsity baseball team during his junior and senior years playing centerfield.

== Coaching career ==
Wentworth began his career coaching for Kenyon from 1900 to 1901.

When hired in 1902 by Case School of Applied Science in Cleveland, Coach Wentworth was the highest paid football coach in the nation at $3,000.

Upon its formation in 1902, Wentworth won the first four titles of the Ohio Athletic Conference with Case School of Applied Science. During this four year stretch, he achieved a dominating league record of 18–1–1, including beating archrival Western Reserve by a combined 132–0.

In 1906, college football's rules changed allowing for the forward pass. After coaching one season under the new rules, Coach Wentworth decided to resign, saying he would go back to Boston and practice law rather than learn football all over again.

== Professional career and later years ==
After graduating Harvard Law School, Wentworth became a member of the Massachusetts bar in 1903 and was associated with the firm Choate, Hall & Stewart of Boston, before officially becoming a member of the firm in 1909.

== Head coaching record ==
Year	Team	Overall	Conference	Standing	Bowl/playoffs
Kenyon Lords (Independent) (1900–1901)
1900	Kenyon	6–1–1			
1901	Kenyon	7–2			
Kenyon:		13–3–1			
Case (Ohio Athletic Conference) (1902–1906)
1902	Case	6–3	5–0	1st	
1903	Case	8–1	5–0	1st	
1904	Case	7–2	4–1	1st	
1905	Case	8–1–1	4–0–1	1st	
1906	Case	4–5–1	2–3	4th	
Case:		33–12–2	20–4–1		
Total:		46–15–3			
