= Baird Brothers Trophy =

Annual college football game trophy

- Teams: Case Western Reserve Spartans; Wooster Fighting Scots
- First meeting: September 22, 1984; Case Western Reserve 21, Wooster 14
- Latest meeting: October 6, 2012; Case Western Reserve 31, Wooster 28

Statistics
- Total meetings: 25
- All-time series: Wooster leads 13–12
- Largest victory: Wooster 49, Case Western Reserve 7 (2004)
- Longest win streak: Wooster, 10 (1995–2006)
- Current win streak: Case Western Reserve, 6 (2007–present)

The Baird Brothers Trophy is awarded the winner of the annual college football game between the Spartans of Case Western Reserve University and the Fighting Scots of The College of Wooster. The idea for the trophy originated with brothers Bob and Bill Baird, economics professors at Case and Wooster, respectively, for whom the trophy is named. The trophy was created by American artist Eugenie Torgerson, who was married to Bob Baird at the time. The winning school gets to keep the trophy, a distinctive chain of brass fish representing each game played in the rivalry, and gets to add a new fish to the chain to represent that year's game. A four-inch blue gill signified the first 21–14 narrow win for Case Western Reserve. Other fish represented on the trophy include a northern pike, a flounder, a carp, a walleye, a catfish, a rainbow trout, a sturgeon, a sucker, a crappie, a muskie, a sheepshead, a gar, a largemouth bass, and a smallmouth bass.

In 1996, Sports Illustrated recognized the Baird Brothers Trophy as one of the most distinctive in college football. In October 2012, the trophy was highlighted on ESPN College GameDay.

Wooster leads the series 13–12.

The teams last met on October 6, 2012 at Cleveland, a 31–28 victory for Spartans.

== Game results ==
Case Western Reserve victories	Wooster victories

No.	Date	Location	Winner	Score
1	September 22, 1984	Wooster, OH	Case Western Reserve	21–14
2	September 21, 1985	Cleveland, OH	Case Western Reserve	37–0
3	October 26, 1986	Cleveland, OH	Case Western Reserve	17–0
4	October 25, 1987	Wooster, OH	Case Western Reserve	20–13
5	October 15, 1988	Cleveland, OH	Case Western Reserve	38–27
6	October 14, 1989	Wooster, OH	Wooster	35–14
7	September 29, 1990	Cleveland, OH	Wooster	22–15
8	October 5, 1991	Wooster, OH	Wooster	23–20
9	October 15, 1994	Cleveland, OH	Case Western Reserve	40–23
10	October 14, 1995	Wooster, OH	Wooster	14–13
11	September 28, 1996	Wooster, OH	Wooster	21–7
12	September 27, 1997	Cleveland, OH	Wooster	21–14
13	November 7, 1998	Wooster, OH	Wooster	42–16

No.	Date	Location	Winner	Score
14	November 6, 1999	Cleveland, OH	Wooster	31–27
15	September 28, 2002	Wooster, OH	Wooster	27–22
16	September 27, 2003	Cleveland, OH	Wooster	62–33
17	September 25, 2004	Wooster, OH	Wooster	49–7
18	September 24, 2005	Cleveland, OH	Wooster	38–21
19	September 23, 2006	Wooster, OH	Wooster	21–7
20	September 22, 2007	Cleveland, OH	Case Western Reserve	30–17
21	October 11, 2008	Cleveland, OH	Case Western Reserve	28–7
22	October 10, 2009	Wooster, OH	Case Western Reserve	53–32
23	October 23, 2010	Cleveland, OH	Case Western Reserve	28–14
24	October 22, 2011	Wooster, OH	Case Western Reserve	24–21^{OT}
25	October 6, 2012	Cleveland, OH	Case Western Reserve	31–28
Series: Wooster leads 13–12
