= 1907 Western Reserve football team =

American college football season

1907 Western Reserve football

OAC champion
- Conference: Ohio Athletic Conference
- Record: 8–1 (5–1 OAC)
- Head coach: William B. Seaman (2nd season)
- Captain: Edgar "Tip" Tyler

1907 Ohio Athletic Conference football standings
| | Conf. | | | | | Overall |
| Team | W | | L | | T | W | | L | | T |
|---|---|---|---|---|---|---|---|---|---|---|
| Western Reserve $ | 5 | – | 1 | – | 0 | 8 | – | 1 | – | 0 |
| Ohio State | 5 | – | 1 | – | 1 | 7 | – | 2 | – | 1 |
| Oberlin | 3 | – | 1 | – | 0 | 6 | – | 2 | – | 0 |
| Case | 5 | – | 2 | – | 0 | 6 | – | 3 | – | 0 |
| Kenyon | 3 | – | 4 | – | 0 | 4 | – | 4 | – | 0 |
| Ohio Wesleyan | 2 | – | 3 | – | 0 | 7 | – | 3 | – | 0 |
| Wooster | 1 | – | 4 | – | 1 | 2 | – | 4 | – | 1 |
| Denison | 1 | – | 5 | – | 0 | 3 | – | 5 | – | 0 |
| Heidelberg | 0 | – | 4 | – | 0 | 2 | – | 4 | – | 0 |
$ – Conference champion

The 1907 Western Reserve football team represented Western Reserve University of Cleveland, Ohio, now known as Case Western Reserve University, during the 1907 college football season. The team's coach was William B. Seaman. Assistant coach was Xen C. Scott.

== Schedule ==
| Date | Opponent | Site | Result | Source |
|---|---|---|---|---|
| October 5 | Wooster | Cleveland, OH | W 29–0 | |
| October 12 | at Heidelberg | Tiffin, OH | W 44–0 | |
| October 19 | Marietta* | Case field; Cleveland, OH | W 45–0 | |
| October 26 | at Baldwin–Wallace* | Berea, OH | W 40–0 | |
| November 2 | Oberlin | Cleveland, OH | L 0–16 | |
| November 9 | at Ohio Northern* | Ada, OH | W 23–0 | |
| November 16 | Kenyon | Cleveland, OH | W 17–6 | |
| November 23 | at Denison | Granville, OH | W 50–0 | |
| November 28 | at Case | Van Horn Field; Cleveland, OH | W 11–4 | |
*Non-conference game
