= Frank Kelker =

American football and basketball player (1913–2003)

Frank "Doc" Kelker
Western Reserve Red Cats
- Position: End

Personal information
- Born: December 9, 1913; Woodville, Florida, U.S.
- Died: May 23, 2003 (aged 89); Henderson, Nevada, U.S.

Career information
- High school: Dover (OH) (1930–1933)
- College: Western Reserve (1935–1937)

Awards and highlights
- Silver All-American, Sports Illustrated (1962); Case Western Reserve Hall of Fame (1975); Dover High Athletic Hall of Fame (2010)

Frank Leon "Doc" Kelker (December 9, 1913 – May 23, 2003) was an All-American college football end, college basketball player, and track star for Western Reserve, now known as Case Western Reserve University, from 1935 to 1937. Spanning high school and college, he played in 54 consecutive football games without a loss. As an African American, his athletic career ended after college as no professional sports had yet broken the color barrier.

== Early life ==
Kelker was born in Woodville, Florida in 1913. He and his family moved north to Dover, Ohio in 1918.

== High school ==
Kelker attended Dover High School in Dover, where he was described as "Mr. Everything," earning 14 varsity letters in football, basketball, baseball, and track. Doc was the first Ohio high school athlete to be named All-Ohio in both football and basketball in the same calendar year.

The Dover football team posted a combined 30–1 record the three seasons he played (1931–1933), including two wins over the Massillon Tigers, famously coached by Paul Brown. He was voted captain his senior year.

As a senior on the basketball team, he played an integral role in the team winning the 1933 Ohio basketball state championship.

As a member of the baseball squad in 1932 and 1933, Kelker's unofficial stats included a .521 batting average with 12 doubles, 7 triples, 5 home runs and 22 stolen bases. The team posted a combined record of 23–4, including a victory over state champion Warren.

In track as a ninth grader, he set the school record for the 100-yard dash at 9.9 seconds.

== College ==
Kelker attended Western Reserve, now known as Case Western Reserve University, in Cleveland, earning nine varsity letters in football, basketball, and track.

During his college football career, the team went a combined 27–2–1, with victories over Cornell, West Virginia, Cincinnati, Bowling Green, Ohio, Toledo, and Akron. In Big Four Conference league play, the team was a perfect 9–0, winning all three titles against John Carroll, Baldwin Wallace, and Case Tech.

The 1937 basketball team went 11–3, including wins over Syracuse, Cincinnati, and Dayton.

== Later life ==
After graduation, Kelker first became a cadet teacher and assistant coach at Cleveland's Central High School, working there for two years. In 1940, he began working at the Cedar Avenue Branch of the Cleveland YMCA as a youth secretary where he served as mentor for many black youths, most notably Louis and Carl Stokes. in 1950, Kelker moved to Kansas City to take the role of executive secretary at the Paseo Branch YMCA. He returned to Cleveland in 1956 to lead as the executive secretary of the Cedar Avenue Branch of the Cleveland YMCA. Kelker also served as a founding trustee and board chair of Cuyahoga Community College.

== Legacy ==
The Frank "Doc" Kelker Scholarship is given annually at Case Western Reserve University to an undergraduate to "remove the barriers between young scholars and their potential".
