= DiSanto Field =

College football/multipurpose stadium

- Interactive map of DiSanto Field
- Former names: Finnigan Fields, Case Field
- Location: 1747 E 118th St, Cleveland, OH 44106
- Coordinates: 41°30′48.4″N 81°36′13.1″W
- Owner: Case Western Reserve University
- Operator: Case Western Reserve University
- Capacity: 2,400
- Surface: FieldTurf
- Public transit: East 115th Street; Little Italy–University Circle

Construction
- Opened: August 2005
- Cost: $126 million USD
- Architect: Goody Clancy

Tenants
- Case Western Reserve Spartans—football, soccer, track and field (NCAA) (2005–present); AFC Cleveland (NPSL) (2014); Cleveland Fusion (WFA) (2014)

DiSanto Field, on the campus of Case Western Reserve University in Cleveland, Ohio, is a 2,400-seat multi-purpose football stadium home to the Case Western Reserve Spartans football, men's and women’s soccer and men's and women's track and field teams.

The press box includes the Coach Bill Edwards president's suite, named after the College Football Hall of Fame inductee coach. In 2008, the eight-lane track surrounding the field was named Coach Bill Sudeck Track.

The Case Western Reserve Spartans football team played its first home game in the new stadium on September 10, 2005, defeating the Denison Big Red 20-6.

== Renovation history ==
In 2014, the Wyant Field House opened, which included the 4500-square foot Steve Belichick Varsity Weight Room, gifted by Bill Belichick in honor of his father.

In 2017, the field was resurfaced with FieldTurf Revolution 360 fiber and an EcoSense EPDM (ethylene propylene diene) fill.

== Draft Day ==
In the 2014 movie, Draft Day, DiSanto Field stood in for Camp Randall Stadium of the Wisconsin Badgers.
