= 1941 Sun Bowl =

American college football game

Western Reserve Red Cats	Arizona State Bulldogs
(7–1)	(7–1–2)
Big Four (Ohio)	Border Conference
26	13
Head coach: Bill Edwards	Head coach: Dixie Howell
	1	2	3	4	Total
Western Reserve	7	0	6	13	26
Arizona State	0	13	0	0	13
- Date: January 1, 1941
- Season: 1940
- Stadium: Kidd Field
- Location: El Paso, Texas
- Referee: Steve Coutchie
- Attendance: 12,000

The 1941 Sun Bowl was a college football postseason bowl game between the Arizona State Bulldogs from Arizona State Teachers College at Tempe in Tempe, Arizona, and the Western Reserve Red Cats from Western Reserve University in Cleveland, known today as Case Western Reserve University.

== Background ==
The Bulldogs were champions of the Border Intercollegiate Athletic Association for the second straight year. The Red Cats were 48–6–2 in the six-year tenure of Coach Bill Edwards, as they made their first ever bowl game. The Red Cats were champions of their regional Ohio league, Big Four Conference, six of the last seven seasons.

== Game summary ==
Steve Belichick (father of NFL head coach Bill Belichick), ran for the first touchdown of the game to give the Red Cats a 7–0 lead. Joe Hernandez threw a touchdown pass to Wayne Pitts to narrow the lead, though the extra point was no good. Arizona State would take the lead on a record setting run. Backed at one point into his endzone while rushing, Hascall Henshaw soon broke free and went 94 yards to the endzone, to give the Bulldogs a 13–7 lead at halftime. Henshaw's run was the school record for longest run from scrimmage until 1968. The Red Cats jumped back into the lead when Willis Waggle recovered a blocked punt and returned it to the endzone for a touchdown. In the fourth quarter, Richard Booth and Johnny Ries both scored a rushing touchdown to make the score 26–13. The Bulldogs only seriously threatened again once, when they drove all the way to the 14-yard line of the Red Cats, but they failed to convert on 4th down at the 12, as the Reserve held on to win the game. In a losing effort, Henshaw had 147 yards rushing.

== Aftermath ==
Howell left the Bulldogs after the game to join the Navy after World War II started. It would not be until 1971 that the team, renamed the Sun Devils in 1946, won a bowl. Edwards left the team to coach the Detroit Lions, and later become the coach at Vanderbilt and Wittenberg. The Red Cats de-emphasized athletics during the 1950s and, in 1970, merged with their longtime rivals, the Case Rough Riders. The new team, the Case Western Reserve Spartans, became part of NCAA Division III when it was created in 1973.
