= Dick Booth =

American football player (1918–1987)

Profile
- Positions: Halfback; Punter

Personal information
- Born: July 13, 1918; Newell, West Virginia
- Died: November 25, 1987 (aged 69); East Liverpool, Ohio
- Listed height: 6 ft 1 in (1.85 m)
- Listed weight: 190 lb (86 kg)

Career information
- High school: East Liverpool
- College: Western Reserve

Career history
- Detroit Lions (1941, 1945)

Career statistics
- Rushing yards: 100
- Rushing Touchdowns: 1
- Receiving yards: 193
- Receiving Touchdowns: 1
- Passing yards: 135
- Passing Touchdowns: 2
- Stats at Pro Football Reference

Richard Thomas Booth (July 13, 1918 – November 25, 1987) was an American football player who played professional football in the National Football League (NFL) for the Detroit Lions in 1941 and 1945.

Booth was born in Newell, WV, before moving to East Liverpool, OH where he played high school football alongside his brother Bill, who would go on to play for the Ohio State Buckeyes football team. Dick Booth played college football at Western Reserve from 1938 to 1941, where he was instrumental in the 1941 Sun Bowl victory against Arizona State.
