= Phil Ragazzo =

American football player (1915–1994)

No. 36, 31, 77, 39, 71
- Positions: Tackle, guard

Personal information
- Born: June 24, 1915; Niles, Ohio, U.S.
- Died: October 3, 1994 (aged 79); Warren, Ohio, U.S.
- Listed height: 6 ft 0 in (1.83 m)
- Listed weight: 216 lb (98 kg)

Career information
- High school: McKinley (Niles)
- College: Case Western Reserve
- NFL draft: 1938: 8th round, 67th overall pick

Career history
- Cleveland Rams (1938–1940); Philadelphia Eagles (1940-1941); New York Giants (1945–1947)

Career NFL statistics
- Games played: 63
- Games started: 31
- Fumble recoveries: 1
- Stats at Pro Football Reference

Philip John Ragazzo (June 24, 1915 – October 3, 1994) was an American professional football player who was a lineman in the National Football League (NFL) for the Cleveland Rams, the Philadelphia Eagles, and the New York Giants. He played college football for the Western Reserve Red Cats (now known as the Case Western Reserve Spartans) and was selected in the eighth round of the 1938 NFL draft by the Green Bay Packers. A graduate of Niles High, he was a three-year letterman for the Red Dragons, graduating in 1934. He was an all- county and All-Ohio selection during a storied scholastic career, playing collegiately for Western Reserve from 1934 to 1937 where he earned All-American honors as a lineman. Considered one of the toughest at his position during his era, he played seven seasons in the National Football League, starting first with the Cleveland Rams (1938–1940) and then moving over to the Philadelphia Eagles (1940–1941) after being traded by the Rams. His play was interrupted by World War II, but he returned to the NFL as a member of the New York Giants where he played from 1945 to 1947. After football, he became a history teacher at Niles McKinley Hs where he taught until his retirement. He died in Niles, Ohio of natural causes, October 3, 1994, at age 79.
