= Bill Edwards (American football coach) =

American football player and coach (1905–1987)

- Miller as new coach of Lions, 1941

Biographical details
- Born: June 21, 1905; Massillon, Ohio, U.S.
- Died: June 12, 1987 (aged 81); Springfield, Ohio, U.S.

Playing career
- 1928–1930: Wittenberg
- Position: Center

Coaching career (HC unless noted)
- 1931: Springfield HS (OH) (assistant)
- 1932–1933: Fostoria HS (OH)
- 1934: Western Reserve (assistant)
- 1935–1940: Western Reserve
- 1941–1942: Detroit Lions
- 1943: Saint Mary's Pre-Flight (assistant)
- 1947–1948: Cleveland Browns (assistant)
- 1949–1952: Vanderbilt
- 1953–1954: North Carolina (assistant)
- 1955–1968: Wittenberg

Administrative career (AD unless noted)
- 1949–1953: Vanderbilt
- 1955–1973: Wittenberg

Head coaching record
- Overall: 168–45–8 (college); 4–9–1 (NFL)
- Bowls: 1–0

Accomplishments and honors

Championships
- 2 NCAA College Division by poll (1962, 1964); 5 Big Four Conference (1935–1938, 1940); 5 OAC (1958, 1961–1964)

Awards
- Ohio College Football Coach of the Year (1957); 2× AFCA College Division COY (1962–1963); Ohio Football Coaches Association Hall of Fame (1979); Wittenberg Athletics Hall of Honor (1985); Case Western Reserve Hall of Fame (1986); Vanderbilt Hall of Fame (1986)
- College Football Hall of Fame; Inducted in 1986 (profile)

William Miller Edwards (June 21, 1905 – June 12, 1987) was an American football player and coach. He served as the head football coach at Western Reserve University, Vanderbilt University and Wittenberg University in a career lasting more than 30 years, compiling a win-loss-tie record of 168–45–8. Edwards also coached the Detroit Lions of the National Football League (NFL) from 1941 to 1942, tallying a 4–9–1 record, and served as an assistant coach for the NFL's Cleveland Browns in the late 1940s.

Raised near Massillon, Ohio, Edwards was the son of an immigrant from Wales who worked in the area's coal mines. He played football at Massillon Washington High School and enrolled at Ohio State University, where he stayed for a year before transferring to Wittenberg University. After college, Edwards began his coaching career at high schools in Ohio. He got his first job as a college head coach in 1935 at Western Reserve, now known as Case Western Reserve University, in Cleveland, Ohio and guided the team to a 49–6–2 record over six seasons. Edwards was then hired to coach the Lions, but his brief stay there was unsuccessful, and he was fired at the beginning of the 1942 season. He enlisted in the U.S. Navy later that year and served in the military during World War II until his discharge in 1946.

Edwards spent a year selling sporting goods in Cleveland, returning to football in 1947 with the Browns as an assistant to head coach Paul Brown, a close friend and former Massillon schoolmate. After two years as the team's tackle coach, he was hired by Vanderbilt in 1949. He stayed there for four years and amassed a 21–19–2 record, but resigned in 1953 under pressure from alumni. After two years as an assistant coach at the University of North Carolina, Edwards was hired by Wittenberg, his alma mater, as head football coach and athletic director. He spent the rest of his career there, serving as head coach until 1968 and remaining as athletic director until 1973. While at Wittenberg, he was named the country's college football coach of the year twice, and his teams posted an overall record of 98–20–4. He was inducted into the College Football Hall of Fame in 1986. Edwards, described as a tough but compassionate coach, had an influence on many men he worked with, including Steve Belichick, the father of former New England Patriots coach Bill Belichick. Steve Belichick played for Edwards at Western Reserve and with the Lions, and coached with him at Vanderbilt and North Carolina. Edwards was the godfather of Bill.

== Early life and college ==
Edwards grew up in Massillon, Ohio and attended Massillon Washington High School. He was a schoolmate of Paul Brown, who later became the coach of the Cleveland Browns and helped found the Cincinnati Bengals in the National Football League. The son of a Welsh coal miner, Edwards dropped out of school when he was 14 to help his family by working in the mines of East Greenville, near Massillon. He returned three years later, however, and became a star player on Massillon's football team. Edwards was a linebacker at Massillon between 1922 and 1924.

Edwards enrolled at Ohio State University where he captained the Buckeyes freshman football team and was roommates with Paul Brown, his former Massillon teammate. After the season, however, he transferred to Wittenberg University in Springfield, Ohio. At Wittenberg, he played as a center starting in 1928 and was the captain of the football team in 1929 and 1930. A tough player, Edwards did not like to wear a helmet, saying "you skin your ears a little without them, but I never had any trouble." He won All-Ohio honors at Wittenberg and was named an honorable mention All-American in 1930. One of Edwards's most memorable games as a collegian came in 1928 against the Ohio Wesleyan Battling Bishops. In the last game of a season in which Wesleyan had a perfect record and beat football powerhouses Michigan and Syracuse, Edwards kicked an extra point as time expired and gave Wittenberg a 7–6 victory. Grantland Rice, a prominent sportswriter of the time, called him the best center in college football. Walter Eckersall of the Chicago Tribune named him an All-American.

== Coaching career ==
=== High school and Western Reserve ===
Edwards got his first coaching job in 1931, when he was hired as an assistant football coach at Springfield High School. He also taught history at the school. The following year, he got his first head coaching job at Fostoria High School in Fostoria, Ohio. After two seasons at Fostoria, during the second of which the team put in its best performance in 10 years with an 8–2 record, he left to coach the freshman football team at Western Reserve University in Cleveland, Ohio in 1933. When Reserve head coach Sam Willaman died suddenly in August 1935, players lobbied for Edwards to take his place; Edwards got the job. Edwards brought in former Massillon and Wittenberg teammate and Fostoria aide Roy A. "Dugan" Miller as his chief assistant, and the Western Reserve Red Cats went undefeated in his first two seasons as coach. The team had a 49–6–2 record between the 1935 and 1940 seasons under Edwards. In his last season, Western Reserve reached the Sun Bowl in El Paso, Texas against Arizona State and won the game 26–13 on New Year's Day in 1941.

=== Detroit Lions, military service, and Cleveland Browns ===
Having built a strong record at Western Reserve, Edwards was in the running for head coaching roles at a number of larger universities and professional teams. He met with officials at Marquette University and was considered a candidate for coaching duties at the University of Colorado and for the National Football League's Detroit Lions. After visiting with Lions owner Fred Mandel, Edwards ultimately was hired in February 1941 to succeed George Clark. Both Edwards and Dugan Miller signed two-year contracts. Edwards was given a $10,000 annual salary ($218,891 in 2025 dollars), more than double the $4,420 he was paid at Western Reserve.

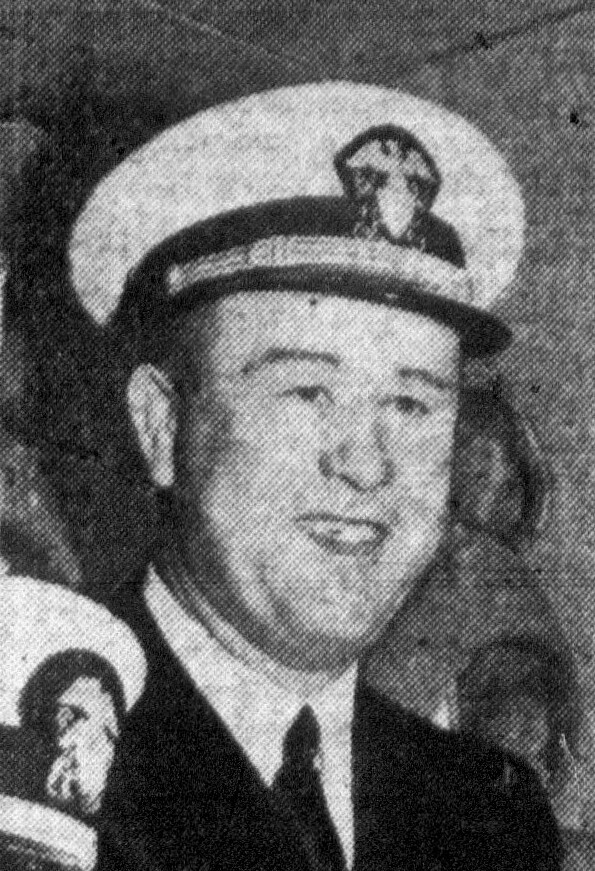
Edwards in 1943

Edwards's stint as the Lions coach was unsuccessful. He guided the team to a 4–6–1 record in 1941, and Mandel fired him after three straight losses to begin the 1942 season as the team's roster was depleted by players' service in World War II. Detroit went on to lose all the rest of its games after John Karcis was named his replacement.

Edwards enlisted in the U.S. Navy later in 1942 as America's involvement in the war intensified. While in the military, he served at St. Mary's Pre-Flight, a training program in California, and coached the Air Devils football team there. He also served at a base in Pensacola, Florida. Edwards was discharged in 1946, and spent a year in the sporting goods business in Cleveland, Ohio before reuniting with Brown, who had become the first coach of the Cleveland Browns in the All-America Football Conference (AAFC). Edwards took a position as a tackle coach and remained with the team for two seasons. He coached tackles including Ernie Blandin, Lou Rymkus and future Pro Football Hall of Fame member Lou Groza. The Browns won the AAFC championship in both of Edwards's years as an assistant; the team won all of its games in 1948, turning in professional football's first perfect season.

=== Vanderbilt, North Carolina, and Wittenberg ===
Edwards was hired as Vanderbilt University's head football coach and athletic director in 1949, replacing Henry Russell Sanders when Sanders left to become head coach at the University of California, Los Angeles. Vanderbilt gave the 43-year-old coach a three-year contract paying a $12,500 salary ($169,143 in today's dollars). "I don't like to leave the Cleveland Browns and Paul Brown in particular," he said at the time. "I'll never forget my experiences with the Browns over the past two years." Edwards remained at Vanderbilt for four seasons, building up a 21–19–2 record. He instituted a modern T formation offense to replace Sanders's more traditional single-wing formation. He resigned in 1953 under pressure from Vanderbilt alumni following a 3–5–2 season. He then moved to the University of North Carolina, where he was an assistant on the football team's coaching staff in 1953 and 1954.

Edwards was hired as athletic director and head football coach at Wittenberg, his alma mater, in 1955. He put in a pro-style offense and focused on passing because his players were smaller than many opponents. "We had small players, but little guys can throw the football and little guys can catch it, whereas you need big guys to block for a running game," he said in 1973. Under Edwards, the Wittenberg Tigers were a major success, amassing a 98–20–4 record in 14 seasons and winning the NCAA College Division national championship poll in 1962 and 1964. Edwards's teams were unbeaten three times and lost one game in five of his seasons there. He was named Ohio College Football Coach of the Year in 1957 by his fellow coaches. The American Football Coaches Association named him coach of the year in 1963 and 1964, when the Tigers won all of their games. He was called "a combination of Genghis Khan and Santa Claus" by Sports Illustrated for being both tough and sympathetic to his players.

== Later life and death ==
Edwards resigned from coaching in 1969, when he was 63 years old, although he continued to work at Wittenberg as the school's athletic director. Dave Maurer, his long-time assistant, took over as the school's coach. By the end of his career, Edwards's 168–45–8 overall college record gave him the second-best winning percentage in the country among active coaches with at least 100 wins. Edwards was given a commendation by President Richard Nixon for his achievements as a coach and won a Football Writers Association of America award for contributions to the game. "His retirement is Wittenberg's loss, but more than that, it is college football's loss," University of Alabama coach Bear Bryant said at the time.

Edwards retired in February 1973 after 39 years as a coach and administrator and said he would concentrate on hunting and fishing. He was inducted into the Ohio Football Coaches Association Hall of Fame in 1979, Wittenberg's Athletics Hall of Honor in 1985 and into the College Football Hall of Fame in 1986. He was also inducted into the Western Reserve Hall of Fame and the Vanderbilt Hall of Fame in 1986. Edwards died in 1987. He and his wife Dorothy had three children.

The tough but compassionate approach to coaching Edwards espoused influenced many men who worked under him, including Maurer, who led Wittenberg to a 129–23–3 record between 1969 and 1983. Wittenberg's football stadium is named Edwards-Maurer Field in honor of both head coaches. The winner of the Case Western Reserve–Wittenberg football game receives the Bill Edwards Trophy.

Edwards was also close with Steve Belichick, who played for him at Western Reserve and for the Detroit Lions and later served as an assistant under him at Vanderbilt and North Carolina. Belichick's son Bill was named after Edwards, who was also Bill's godfather. Bill Belichick later became an assistant and head coach in the NFL and became the head coach of the New England Patriots. At what is now known as Case Western Reserve University, the football stadium, DiSanto Field, hosts its distinguished guests inside the Coach Bill Edwards President's Suite.

== Head coaching record ==
=== College ===
Year	Team	Overall	Conference	Standing	Bowl/playoffs
Western Reserve Red Cats (Big Four Conference) (1935–1940)
1935	Western Reserve	9–0–1	3–0	1st	
1936	Western Reserve	10–0	3–0	1st	
1937	Western Reserve	8–2	3–0	1st	
1938	Western Reserve	9–0	3–0	1st	
1939	Western Reserve	5–3–1	1–2	3rd	
1940	Western Reserve	8–1	3–0	1st	W Sun
Western Reserve:		49–6–2	16-2		
Vanderbilt Commodores (Southeastern Conference) (1949–1952)
1949	Vanderbilt	5–5	4–4	7th	
1950	Vanderbilt	7–4	3–4	7th	
1951	Vanderbilt	6–5	3–5	T–7th	
1952	Vanderbilt	3–5–2	1–4–1	11th	
Vanderbilt:		21–19–2	11–17–1		
Wittenberg Tigers (Ohio Athletic Conference) (1955–1968)
1955	Wittenberg	4–3–2	3–3–2	T–7th	
1956	Wittenberg	5–2–1	5–2–1	T–4th	
1957	Wittenberg	7–2	6–1	2nd	
1958	Wittenberg	8–1	6–0	1st	
1959	Wittenberg	5–3	5–3	6th	
1960	Wittenberg	8–1	5–1	T–3rd	
1961	Wittenberg	8–1	6–0	1st	
1962	Wittenberg	9–0	6–0	1st	
1963	Wittenberg	8–0–1	6–0–1	1st	
1964	Wittenberg	8–0	7–0	1st	
1965	Wittenberg	6–2	4–1	T–2nd	
1966	Wittenberg	8–1	4–0	2nd	
1967	Wittenberg	8–1	3–1	T–4th	
1968	Wittenberg	6–3	3–2	6th	
Wittenberg:		98–20–4	70–14–4		
Total:		168–45–8			
National championship Conference title Conference division title or championship game berth

=== Professional ===
Team	Year	Regular season					Postseason			
Team	Year	Won	Lost	Ties	Win %	Finish	Won	Lost	Win %	Result
DET	1941	4	6	1	36.36	3rd in NFL West Division	-	-	-	
DET	1942	0	3	0	0.0	5th in NFL West Division	-	-	-	
Professional Total		4	9	1	28.57		-	-	-	0 league titles in 2 seasons
Source: Pro-Football-Reference.com
