= North Coast Athletic Conference =

NCAA Division III athletic conference

- Association: NCAA
- Founded: 1983
- Commissioner: Keri Alexander Luchowski
- Sports fielded: 23; men's: 11; women's: 12
- Division: Division III
- No. of teams: 9
- Headquarters: Cleveland, Ohio
- Region: Great Lakes
- Website: northcoast.org

Locations
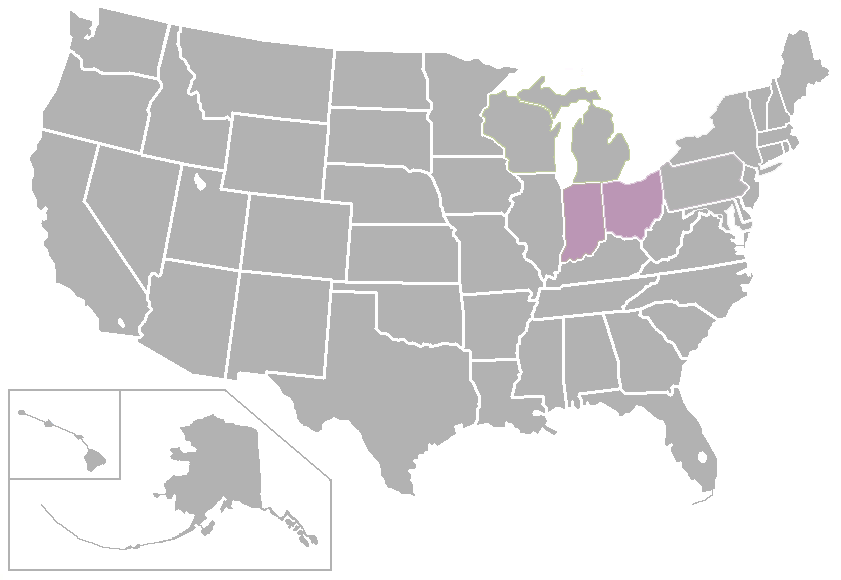

North Coast Athletic Conference
Location of NCAC members: full members

The North Coast Athletic Conference (NCAC) is an intercollegiate athletic conference that competes in the National Collegiate Athletic Association (NCAA) Division III which is composed of colleges located in Ohio and Indiana. It sponsors 23 sports, 11 for men and 12 for women.

== History ==
The formation of the NCAC was announced at joint news conferences in Cleveland, Columbus and Pittsburgh in February 1983. Allegheny College, Case Western Reserve University (CWRU), Denison University, Kenyon College, Oberlin College, Ohio Wesleyan University, and The College of Wooster were charter members in 1984, the same year that NCAC athletic conference play began. The conference offered 10 women's sports, the most offered by a conference at that time.

In 1988, Earlham College and Wittenberg College accepted invitations to join the NCAC, pushing conference membership to nine schools in three states. The two schools would begin play in the fall of 1989. In 1998, Hiram College, and Wabash College accepted invitations to join the NCAC, pushing conference membership to 10 schools in three states, which both schools began play in the fall of 1999. Case Western Reserve, a charter member of the NCAC, announced that it would leave the NCAC following the 1998–99 academic year. The Spartans would compete on a full-time basis in the University Athletic Association (UAA) after more than a decade of joint conference membership affiliation.

Earlham announced it would depart the NCAC for the Heartland Collegiate Athletic Conference (HCAC), beginning with the 2010–11 season. DePauw University became the 10th member of the NCAC beginning in the 2011–12 season.

Allegheny left the NCAC after the 2021–22 school year to return to its former home of the Presidents' Athletic Conference (PAC). Allegheny and Earlham remain single-sport NCAC members in field hockey. Later in 2022, Transylvania University and Washington & Jefferson College were announced as single-sport NCAC members for field hockey, beginning with the 2023 season.

The most recent changes to the NCAC membership were announced in 2024. First, on January 18, John Carroll University announced it was leaving the Ohio Athletic Conference to join the NCAC. Then on April 23, Hiram announced it would leave the NCAC in 2025 to return to the PAC, which it had left in 1989.

=== Chronological timeline ===
- 1983 – In February 1983, the North Coast Athletic Conference (NCAC) was founded. Charter members included Allegheny College, Case Western Reserve University (CWRU), Denison University, Kenyon College, Oberlin College, Ohio Wesleyan University and The College of Wooster, beginning the 1984–85 academic year.
- 1989 – Earlham College and Wittenberg College joined the NCAC in the 1989–90 academic year.
- 1999:
  - Case Western Reserve left the NCAC to fully align all of its sports to the University Athletic Association (UAA) after the 1998–99 academic year.
  - Hiram College and Wabash College joined the NCAC in the 1999–2000 academic year.
- 2010 – Earlham left the NCAC to join the Heartland Collegiate Athletic Conference (HCAC) after the 2009–10 academic year; while it remained in the conference as an affiliate member for field hockey, beginning the 2010–11 school year.
- 2011 – DePauw University joined the NCAC in the 2011–12 academic year.
- 2022 – Allegheny left the NCAC to rejoin the Presidents' Athletic Conference (PAC) after the 2021–22 academic year; while it remained in the conference as an affiliate member for field hockey, beginning the 2022–23 school year.
- 2023 – Transylvania University and Washington & Jefferson College joined the NCAC as affiliate members for field hockey in the 2023 fall season (2023–24 academic year).
- 2025:
  - Hiram left the NCAC to rejoin the PAC after the 2024–25 academic year.
  - John Carroll University joined the NCAC beginning the 2025–26 academic year.
- 2026 – Washington University in St. Louis joined the NCAC as an affiliate member for football, beginning the 2026 fall season (2026–27 academic year).

=== Diversity, equity, and inclusion (DEI) initiatives ===
In 2019, the NCAC was one of the first NCAA conferences to participate in the organization's LGBTQ OneTeam Program, which launched in fall 2019. Two facilitators from the NCAC – Seth Hayes of Denison University and Rhea Debussy of Kenyon College – were among the first 30 facilitators for this NCAA Division III program. In 2021, the NCAA announced that two NCAC staff members – Kate Costanzo of Allegheny College and Rhea Debussy of Kenyon College – were finalists for the NCAA Division III LGBTQ Administrator/Coach/Staff of the Year Award.

== Member schools ==
=== Current members ===
The NCAC currently has nine full members, all private schools.

Institution	Location	Founded	Affiliation	Enrollment	2022 US News ranking	2021 Forbes Top Colleges	Nickname	Joined (Note: Represents the calendar year when fall sports competition begins.)	Colors
Denison University	Granville, Ohio	1831	Nonsectarian	2,100	42	288	Big Red	1984	
DePauw University	Greencastle, Indiana	1837	Methodist	2,350	46	130	Tigers	2011	
John Carroll University	University Heights, Ohio	1886	Catholic (Jesuit)	2,615			Blue Streaks	2025	
Kenyon College	Gambier, Ohio	1824	Episcopal/Anglican	1,640	30	287	Owls	1984	
Oberlin College	Oberlin, Ohio	1833	Nonsectarian	2,850	37	290	Yeomen & Yeowomen	1984	
Ohio Wesleyan University	Delaware, Ohio	1842	Nonsectarian (Note: Formerly affiliated with the United Methodist Church until 2019.)	1,850	98	446	Battling Bishops	1984	
Wabash College (Note: This institution is a men's college, therefore it does not compete in women's teams.)	Crawfordsville, Indiana	1832	Nonsectarian	850	57	327	Little Giants	1999	
Wittenberg University	Springfield, Ohio	1845	Lutheran ELCA	2,050	155	435	Tigers	1989	
The College of Wooster	Wooster, Ohio	1866	Nonsectarian	1,827	71	428	Fighting Scots	1984	

=== Affiliate members ===
The NCAC has five affiliate members, all are private schools.

Institution	Location	Founded	Affiliation	Enrollment	Nickname	Joined (Note: Represents the calendar year when fall sports competition begins.)	NCAC sport(s)	Primary conference
Allegheny College (Note: Allegheny was a full member of the NCAC from 1984–85 to 2021–22.)	Meadville, Pennsylvania	1815	United Methodist	1,442	Gators	2022	Field hockey	Presidents' (PAC)
Earlham College (Note: Earlham was a full member of the NCAC from 1989–90 to 2009–10.)	Richmond, Indiana	1847	Quaker	900	Quakers	2010	Field hockey	Heartland (HCAC)
Transylvania University	Lexington, Kentucky	1780	Disciples of Christ	963	Pioneers	2023	Field hockey	Heartland (HCAC)
Washington & Jefferson College	Washington, Pennsylvania	1781	Nonsectarian	1,168	Presidents	2023	Field hockey	Presidents' (PAC)
Washington University in St. Louis	St. Louis, Missouri	1853	Nonsectarian	14,117	Bears	2026	Football	University (UAA)

=== Former members ===
The NCAC has four former full members, all private schools.

Institution	Location	Founded	Affiliation	Enrollment	Nickname	Joined (Note: Represents the calendar year when fall sports competition begins.)	Left (Note: Represents the calendar year when spring sports competition ends.)	Current conference
Allegheny College (Note: Allegheny remains in the NCAC as an affiliate member in field hockey.)	Meadville, Pennsylvania	1815	United Methodist	2,100	Gators	1984	2022	Presidents' (PAC)
Case Western Reserve University (Note: Case Western Reserve had dual athletic conference membership with the University Athletic Association from 1986–87 to 1998–99, then the Spartans left the NCAC in order to fully align with the UAA.)	Cleveland, Ohio	1826	Nonsectarian	11,824	Spartans	1984	1999	University (UAA)
Earlham College (Note: Earlham remains in the NCAC as an affiliate member in field hockey.)	Richmond, Indiana	1847	Quakers	1,181	Quakers	1989	2010	Heartland (HCAC)
Hiram College	Hiram, Ohio	1850	Disciples of Christ	1,395	Terriers	1999	2025	Presidents' (PAC)

=== Membership timeline ===
Full member (all sports) Full member (non-football) Associate member (football) Associate member (sport)

== Sports ==
Conference Sports

Sport	Men's	Women's
Baseball	✓	
Basketball	✓	✓
Cross Country	✓	✓
Field Hockey		✓
Football	✓	
Golf	✓	✓
Lacrosse	✓	✓
Soccer	✓	✓
Softball		✓
Swimming & Diving	✓	✓
Tennis	✓	✓
Track & Field (Indoor)	✓	✓
Track & Field (Outdoor)	✓	✓
Volleyball		✓

=== Men's Sports ===
School	Baseball	Basketball	Cross Country	Football	Golf	Lacrosse	Soccer	Swimming & Diving	Tennis	Track & Field (Indoor)	Track & Field (Outdoor)	Total NCAC Sports
Denison	✓	✓	✓	✓	✓	✓	✓	✓	✓	✓	✓	11
DePauw	✓	✓	✓	✓	✓	✓	✓	✓	✓	✓	✓	11
John Carroll	✓	✓	✓	✓	✓	✓	✓	✓	✓	✓	✓	11
Kenyon	✓	✓	✓	✓	✓	✓	✓	✓	✓	✓	✓	11
Oberlin	✓	✓	✓	✓	✗	✓	✓	✓	✓	✓	✓	10
Ohio Wesleyan	✓	✓	✓	✓	✓	✓	✓	✓	✓	✓	✓	11
Wabash	✓	✓	✓	✓	✓	✓	✓	✓	✓	✓	✓	11
Wittenberg	✓	✓	✓	✓	✓	✓	✓	✓	✓	✓	✓	11
Wooster	✓	✓	✓	✓	✓	✓	✓	✓	✓	✓	✓	11
Totals	9	9	9	9+1	8	9	9	9	9	9	9	98+1
Affiliate Members
WashU				✓								1

==== Men's varsity sports not sponsored by the NCAC ====
School	Bowling	Squash	Volleyball	Wrestling
Denison		LL		
John Carroll				IND
Ohio Wesleyan				IND
Wabash			MCVL	IND
Wittenberg	OBC		MCVL	

=== Women's Sports ===
School	Basketball	Cross Country	Field Hockey	Golf	Lacrosse	Soccer	Softball	Swimming & Diving	Tennis	Track & Field (Indoor)	Track & Field (Outdoor)	Volleyball	Total NCAC Sports
Denison	✓	✓	✓	✓	✓	✓	✓	✓	✓	✓	✓	✓	12
DePauw	✓	✓	✓	✓	✓	✓	✓	✓	✓	✓	✓	✓	12
John Carroll	✓	✓	✓	✓	✓	✓	✓	✓	✓	✓	✓	✓	12
Kenyon	✓	✓	✓	✓	✓	✓	✓	✓	✓	✓	✓	✓	12
Oberlin	✓	✓	✓	✗	✓	✓	✓	✓	✓	✓	✓	✓	11
Ohio Wesleyan	✓	✓	✓	✓	✓	✓	✓	✓	✓	✓	✓	✓	12
Wittenberg	✓	✓	✓	✓	✓	✓	✓	✓	✓	✓	✓	✓	12
Wooster	✓	✓	✓	✓	✓	✓	✓	✓	✓	✓	✓	✓	12
Totals	8	8	8+4	7	8	8	8	8	8	8	8	8	95+4
Affiliate Members
Allegheny			✓										1
Earlham			✓										1
Transylvania			✓										1
Washington & Jefferson			✓										1

==== Women's varsity sports not sponsored by the NCAC ====
School	Bowling	Fencing	Squash	Wrestling
Denison		CCFC	LL	
John Carroll				AMCC
Wittenberg	OBC			

== See also ==
- Five Colleges of Ohio
- NCAC men's basketball tournament
