= List of Chicago Maroons football seasons =

This is a list of seasons completed by the Chicago Maroons football team of the National Collegiate Athletic Association (NCAA) Division III and have been a football-only member of the Midwest Conference since 2017. The University of Chicago was a founding member of the Big Ten Conference and the Maroons were coached by Amos Alonzo Stagg for 41 seasons. In the late 1930s, university president Robert Maynard Hutchins decided that big-time college football and the university's commitment to academics were not compatible. The University of Chicago abolished its football program in 1939 and withdrew from the Big Ten in 1946. Football returned to the University of Chicago in 1963 in the form of a club team, which was upgraded to varsity status in 1969. The Maroons began competing in Division III in 1973.

== Seasons ==
| Year | Coach | Overall | Conference | Standing | Bowl/playoffs | Coaches^{#} | AP^{°} |
|---|---|---|---|---|---|---|---|
Amos Alonzo Stagg (Independent) (1892–1895)
| 1892 | Amos Alonzo Stagg | 1–4–2 | | | | | |
| 1893 | Amos Alonzo Stagg | 6–4–2 | | | | | |
| 1894 | Amos Alonzo Stagg | 11–7–1 | | | | | |
| 1895 | Amos Alonzo Stagg | 7–3 | | | | | |
Amos Alonzo Stagg (Western Conference / Big Ten Conference) (1896–1932)
| 1896 | Amos Alonzo Stagg | 11–2–1 | 3–2 | 4th | | | |
| 1897 | Amos Alonzo Stagg | 8–1 | 3–1 | 2nd | | | |
| 1898 | Amos Alonzo Stagg | 9–2–1 | 3–1 | 2nd | | | |
| 1899 | Amos Alonzo Stagg | 12–0–2 | 4–0 | 1st | | | |
| 1900 | Amos Alonzo Stagg | 7–5–1 | 2–3–1 | 6th | | | |
| 1901 | Amos Alonzo Stagg | 5–5–2 | 0–4–1 | 9th | | | |
| 1902 | Amos Alonzo Stagg | 11–1 | 5–1 | 2nd | | | |
| 1903 | Amos Alonzo Stagg | 10–2–1 | 4–1 | 4th | | | |
| 1904 | Amos Alonzo Stagg | 8–1–1 | 5–1–1 | 3rd | | | |
| 1905 | Amos Alonzo Stagg | 11–0 | 7–0 | 1st | | | |
| 1906 | Amos Alonzo Stagg | 4–1 | 3–1 | 4th | | | |
| 1907 | Amos Alonzo Stagg | 4–1 | 4–0 | 1st | | | |
| 1908 | Amos Alonzo Stagg | 5–0–1 | 5–0 | 1st | | | |
| 1909 | Amos Alonzo Stagg | 4–1–2 | 4–1–1 | 2nd | | | |
| 1910 | Amos Alonzo Stagg | 2–5 | 2–4 | T–5th | | | |
| 1911 | Amos Alonzo Stagg | 6–1 | 5–1 | 2nd | | | |
| 1912 | Amos Alonzo Stagg | 6–1 | 6–1 | 2nd | | | |
| 1913 | Amos Alonzo Stagg | 7–0 | 7–0 | 1st | | | |
| 1914 | Amos Alonzo Stagg | 4–2–1 | 4–2–1 | 7th | | | |
| 1915 | Amos Alonzo Stagg | 5–2 | 4–2 | 3rd | | | |
| 1916 | Amos Alonzo Stagg | 3–4 | 3–3 | 5th | | | |
| 1917 | Amos Alonzo Stagg | 3–2–1 | 2–2–1 | 5th | | | |
| 1918 | Amos Alonzo Stagg | 0–6 | 0–5 | 10th | | | |
| 1919 | Amos Alonzo Stagg | 5–2 | 4–2 | 3rd | | | |
| 1920 | Amos Alonzo Stagg | 3–4 | 2–4 | 8th | | | |
| 1921 | Amos Alonzo Stagg | 6–1 | 4–1 | 2nd | | | |
| 1922 | Amos Alonzo Stagg | 5–1–1 | 4–0–1 | 1st | | | |
| 1923 | Amos Alonzo Stagg | 7–1 | 7–1 | 3rd | | | |
| 1924 | Amos Alonzo Stagg | 4–1–3 | 3–0–3 | 1st | | | |
| 1925 | Amos Alonzo Stagg | 3–4–1 | 2–2–1 | 7th | | | |
| 1926 | Amos Alonzo Stagg | 2–6 | 0–5 | 10th | | | |
| 1927 | Amos Alonzo Stagg | 4–4 | 4–4 | 5th | | | |
| 1928 | Amos Alonzo Stagg | 2–7 | 0–5 | 10th | | | |
| 1929 | Amos Alonzo Stagg | 7–3 | 1–3 | 7th | | | |
| 1930 | Amos Alonzo Stagg | 2–5–2 | 0–4 | 10th | | | |
| 1931 | Amos Alonzo Stagg | 2–6–1 | 1–4 | 8th | | | |
| 1932 | Amos Alonzo Stagg | 3–4–1 | 1–4 | 8th | | | |
Clark Shaughnessy (Big Ten Conference) (1933–1939)
| 1933 | Clark Shaughnessy | 3–3–2 | 0–3–2 | T–8th | | | |
| 1934 | Clark Shaughnessy | 4–4 | 2–4 | 7th | | | |
| 1935 | Clark Shaughnessy | 4–4 | 2–3 | T–7th | | | |
| 1936 | Clark Shaughnessy | 2–5–1 | 1–4 | 7th | | | |
| 1937 | Clark Shaughnessy | 1–6 | 0–4 | 9th | | | |
| 1938 | Clark Shaughnessy | 1–6–1 | 0–4 | 10th | | | |
| 1939 | Clark Shaughnessy | 2–6 | 0–3 | 10th | | | |
Walter Hass (Independent) (1969–1975)
| 1969 | Walter Hass | 2–4 | | | | | |
| 1970 | Walter Hass | 2–5 | | | | | |
| 1971 | Walter Hass | 3–4 | | | | | |
| 1972 | Walter Hass | 1–6 | | | | | |
| 1973 | Walter Hass | 0–6–1 | | | | | |
| 1974 | Walter Hass | 0–8 | | | | | |
| 1975 | Walter Hass | 1–7 | | | | | |
Bob Lombardi (Midwest Collegiate Athletic Conference) (1976–1978)
| 1976 | Bob Lombardi | 4–4 | 1–3 | T–3rd (East) | | | |
| 1977 | Bob Lombardi | 2–6 | 1–3 | 4th (East) | | | |
| 1978 | Bob Lombardi | 3–5 | 1–3 | 4th (Blue) | | | |
Tom Kurucz (Midwest Collegiate Athletic Conference) (1979)
| 1979 | Tom Kurucz | 2–6 | 1–3 | T–4th (Red) | | | |
Robert Larsen (Midwest Collegiate Athletic Conference) (1980–1982)
| 1980 | Robert Larsen | 1–8 | 1–7 | T–9th | | | |
| 1981 | Robert Larsen | 2–6–1 | 2–6 | T–8th | | | |
| 1982 | Robert Larsen | 0–9 | 0–4 | 5th (North) | | | |
Mick Ewing (Midwest Collegiate Athletic Conference) (1983–1986)
| 1983 | Mick Ewing | 2–7 | 0–4 | 5th (North) | | | |
| 1984 | Mick Ewing | 3–6 | 1–6 | 6th (North) | | | |
| 1985 | Mick Ewing | 5–4 | 3–4 | T–3rd (North) | | | |
| 1986 | Mick Ewing | 3–6 | 2–5 | T–5th (North) | | | |
Mick Ewing (Independent) (1987)
| 1987 | Mick Ewing | 5–3 | | | | | |
Rich Parrinello (University Athletic Association) (1988)
| 1988 | Rich Parrinello | 3–6 | 0–3 | 4th | | | |
Greg Quick (University Athletic Association) (1989–1993)
| 1989 | Greg Quick | 2–7 | 0–3 | 4th | | | |
| 1990 | Greg Quick | 1–9 | 0–4 | 5th | | | |
| 1991 | Greg Quick | 0–10 | 0–4 | 5th | | | |
| 1992 | Greg Quick | 3–7 | 1–3 | 3rd | | | |
| 1993 | Greg Quick | 5–5 | 2–2 | 3rd | | | |
Dick Maloney (University Athletic Association) (1994–2012)
| 1994 | Dick Maloney | 5–5 | 2–2 | 3rd | | | |
| 1995 | Dick Maloney | 8–2 | 2–2 | 3rd | | | |
| 1996 | Dick Maloney | 4–5 | 1–3 | 4th | | | |
| 1997 | Dick Maloney | 5–4 | 1–3 | 3rd | | | |
| 1998 | Dick Maloney | 7–2 | 4–0 | 1st | | | |
| 1999 | Dick Maloney | 5–4 | 1–3 | 4th | | | |
| 2000 | Dick Maloney | 7–2 | 4–0 | 1st | | | |
| 2001 | Dick Maloney | 6–3 | 1–3 | 3rd | | | |
| 2002 | Dick Maloney | 4–5 | 2–2 | 2nd | | | |
| 2003 | Dick Maloney | 2–7 | 1–3 | 4th | | | |
| 2004 | Dick Maloney | 3–6 | 0–3 | 4th | | | |
| 2005 | Dick Maloney | 5–4 | 3–0 | 1st | | | |
| 2006 | Dick Maloney | 4–5 | 0–3 | 4th | | | |
| 2007 | Dick Maloney | 4–5 | 0–3 | 4th | | | |
| 2008 | Dick Maloney | 3–6 | 1–2 | T–2nd | | | |
| 2009 | Dick Maloney | 5–4 | 1–2 | T–2nd | | | |
| 2010 | Dick Maloney | 8–2 | 3–0 | 1st | | | |
| 2011 | Dick Maloney | 5–5 | 0–3 | 4th | | | |
| 2012 | Dick Maloney | 4–6 | 0–3 | 4th | | | |
Chris Wilkerson (University Athletic Association) (2013–2014)
| 2013 | Chris Wilkerson | 6–4 | 1–2 | 3rd | | | |
| 2014 | Chris Wilkerson | 8–1 | 3–0 | 1st | | | |
Chris Wilkerson (Southern Athletic Association) (2015–2016)
| 2015 | Chris Wilkerson | 6–4 | 5–3 | T–4th | | | |
| 2016 | Chris Wilkerson | 4–6 | 4–4 | T–5th | | | |
Chris Wilkerson (Midwest Conference) (2017–2021)
| 2017 | Chris Wilkerson | 6–4 | 3–2 | T–2nd (North) | | | |
| 2018 | Chris Wilkerson | 7–3 | 4–1 | 2nd (North) | | | |
| 2019 | Chris Wilkerson | 6–3 | 3–1 | 2nd (South) | | | |
| 2020 | No team | | | | | | |
| 2021 | Chris Wilkerson | 8–2 | 7–2 | 3rd | | | |
Todd Gilcrist Jr. (Midwest Conference) (2022–2023)
| 2022 | Todd Gilcrist Jr. | 7–3 | 6–3 | 4th | | | |
| 2023 | Todd Gilcrist Jr. | 6–4 | 6–3 | 4th (South) | | | |
Max Andrews (Midwest Conference) (2024)
| 2024 | Max Andrews | 6–4 | 6–3 | 4th | | | |
Craig Knoche (Midwest Conference) (2025–present)
| 2025 | Craig Knoche | 7–3 | 7–2 | T–2nd | | | |
| 2026 | Craig Knoche | 8–2 | 7–1 | T–2nd | Lakefront Bowl | | |
| Total: | | 472–423–32 | | | | | |
National championship Conference title Conference division title or championship game berth
^{†}Indicates Bowl Coalition, Bowl Alliance, BCS, or CFP / New Years' Six bowl.; ^{#}Rankings from final Coaches Poll.

== See also ==
- List of Big Ten Conference football standings (1896–1958)
