= List of Chicago Maroons head football coaches =

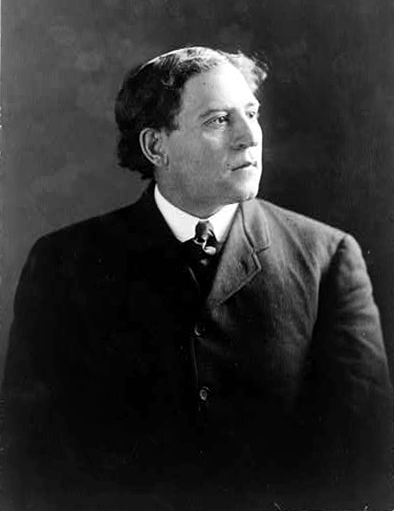
Football legend Amos Alonzo Stagg was the first head coach at Chicago.

The Chicago Maroons football program is a college football team that represents University of Chicago in the University Athletic Association, a part of the NCAA Division III. The team has had 12 head coaches since its first recorded football game in 1892. The current coach is Todd Gilcrist, Jr., who took over for Chris Wilkerson.

== Key ==
Key to symbols in coaches list
General		Overall		Conference		Postseason (Note: Although the first Rose Bowl Game was played in 1902, it has been continuously played since the 1916 game, and is recognized as the oldest bowl game by the NCAA. "—" indicates any season prior to 1916 when postseason games were not played.)	
No.	Order of coaches (Note: A running total of the number of head coaches, with coaches who served separate tenures being counted only once. Interim head coaches are represented with "Int" and are not counted in the running total. "—" indicates the team played but either without a coach or no coach is on record. "X" indicates an interim year without play.)	GC	Games coached	CW	Conference wins	PW	Postseason wins
DC	Division championships	OW	Overall wins	CL	Conference losses	PL	Postseason losses
CC	Conference championships	OL	Overall losses	CT	Conference ties	PT	Postseason ties
NC	National championships	OT	Overall ties (Note: Overtime rules in college football were introduced in 1996, making ties impossible in the period since.)	C%	Conference winning percentage		
†	Elected to the College Football Hall of Fame	O%	Overall winning percentage (Note: When computing the win–loss percentage, a tie counts as half a win and half a loss.)				

== Coaches ==
No.	Name	Term	GC	OW	OL	OT	O%	CW	CL	CT	C%	PW	PL	CCs	Awards
1	Amos Alonzo Stagg^{†}	1892–1932	412	270	113	29	.691	—	—	—	—	—	—	—	National Champions: 1905, 1913; Big Ten Conference Champions: 1899, 1905, 1907, 1908, 1913, 1922, 1924
2	Clark Shaughnessy^{†}	1933–1939	55	17	34	4	.345	—	—	—	—	—	—	—	—
3	Walter Hass	1963–1975	60	11	48	1	.192	—	—	—	—	—	—	—	—
4	Bob Lombardi	1976–1978	24	9	15	0	.375	—	—	—	—	—	—	—	—
5	Tom Kurucz	1979	8	2	6	0	.250	—	—	—	—	—	—	—	—
6	Robert Larsen	1980–1982	27	3	23	1	.130	—	—	—	—	—	—	—	—
7	Mick Ewing	1983–1987	44	18	26	0	.409	—	—	—	—	—	—	—	—
8	Rich Parrinello	1988	9	3	6	0	.333	—	—	—	—	—	—	—	—
9	Greg Quick	1989–1993	49	11	38	0	.224	—	—	—	—	—	—	—	—
10	Dick Maloney	1994–2012	176	94	82	0	.525	—	—	—	—	—	—	—	University Athletic Association conference champions: 1998, 2000, 2005, 2010
11	Chris Wilkerson	2013–2021	78	51	27	0	.654	—	—	—	—	—	—	—	University Athletic Association conference champions: 2014
12	Todd Gilcrist Jr.	2022–2023	20	13	7	0	.650	—	—	—	—	—	—	—	—
13	Max Andrews	2024	10	6	4	0	.600	—	—	—	—	—	—	—	—
14	Craig Knoche	2025–present	10	7	3	0	.700	—	—	—	—	—	—	—	—
