= Sachar =

Sachar may refer to:

- Sachar (biblical figure), a minor biblical figure
- Abram L. Sachar, American historian and Brandeis University president
- Bhim Sen Sachar, Indian politician
- David B. Sachar, American gastroenterologist
- Edward J. Sachar (1933–1984), American psychiatrist
- Howard Sachar, American historian and an author
- Louis Sachar, American author of young adult books
- Raghav Sachar, Indian singer
- Rajinder Sachar, Chief Justice of High Court of Delhi, New Delhi

== See also ==
- Sacchar (Greek for sugar), the root word of saccharine.
- Sakar (disambiguation)
