= 2013 NCAA Division III men's basketball tournament qualifying teams =

Qualifying teams

This is a list of qualifying teams for the 2013 NCAA Division III men's basketball tournament. A total of 62 teams entered the tournament. Forty-one of the teams earned automatic bids by winning their conference tournaments. The automatic bid of the University Athletic Association, which does not conduct a post-season tournament, went to its regular season champion. The remaining twenty teams were granted at-large bids, which are extended by the NCAA Selection Committee.

== Qualifying teams ==
=== Automatic bids ===
Automatic bids to the tournament were granted for winning a conference championship tournament, except for the automatic bid of the University Athletic Association given to the regular season champion. Seeds listed were seeds within the conference tournaments. Runners-up in bold face were given at-large berths.

Automatic bids
Qualifying school	Record (conf.)	Last app.	Conference	Finish	Regular season second place	Second place record (conf.)	Finish
Washington U.	20-5 (10-4)	2012	UAA	1st	**Rochester**	21-4 (10-4)	2nd
Qualifying School	Record (Conf.)	Last app.	Conference	Seed	Conf. Finals Runner-Up	Runner-up Record (Conf.)	Runner-up Seed
Cabrini	22-5 (16–2)	2012	Colonial States	1	Keystone	18-10 (13–5)	3
Ramapo	26–6 (14–2)	2011	New Jersey	1	**Rutgers-Newark**	20-7 (13-5)	2
Fitchburg State	16-10 (5-7)	Never	MASCAC	5	Mass. College	14-13 (9-3)	2
Delaware Valley	19-8 (11-3)	2011	MAC-Freedom	2	DeSales	21–6 (12–2)	1
Curry	21-7 (15-3)	2008	Commonwealth Coast	1	Gordon	21-7 (14-4)	2
Albertus Magnus	24-4 (15-3)	2012	Great Northeast	2	Anna Maria	20-8 (16-2)	1
Elms	18-9 (14-2)(	2011	New England	1	Regis	13-15 (11-5)	3
Husson	18-9 (14-4)	2011	North Atlantic	2	Castleton State	16-12 (12-6)	4
Alvernia	23-4 (15-3)	2011	MAC-Commonwealth	1	Lycoming	17-10 (10-8)	3
Penn State-Behrend	20-8 (13-5)	2011	Allegheny Mountain	3	Medaille	18-10 (13-5)	4
Ithaca	19-8 (10-4)	2012	Empire 8	2	**Stevens**	22-5 (11-3)	1
Hobart	21-6 (15-1)	2012	Liberty	1	RPI	17-10 (10-8)	3
Aurora	22-6 (14-2)	2010	Northern	South 1	Lakeland	22-6 (13-3)	North 1
St. Mary's (Md.)	24-3 (10-2)	2012	Capital	1	**Wesley**	20-7 (9-3)	2
St. Norbert	20-5 (15-3)	2011	Midwest	1	Carroll	18-7 (13-5)	3
Cortland State	23-4 (15-3)	2006	SUNYAC	1	**Plattsburgh State**	19-8 (14-4)	2
Staten Island	22-5 (14-2)	2012	CUNYAC	1	John Jay	15-13 (9-7)	3
Rhode Island College	25-3 (13-1)	2012	Little East	1	Keene State	17-11 (9-5)	3
Christopher Newport	21-5 (11-3)	2012	USA South	1	Greensboro	18-9 (9-5)	3
Catholic	24-3 (12-2)	2007	Landmark	1	Juniata	18-9 (9-5)	3
Dickinson	20-7 (13-5)	1997	Centennial	2	Franklin and Marshall	20-7 (14-4)	1
Rose-Hulman	24-3 (16-2)	2012	Heartland	1	Hanover	18-9 (14-4)	3
Ohio Wesleyan	22-5 (12-4)	2011	North Coast	2	**Wooster**	22-5 (14-2)	1
SUNY-Purchase	22-5 (14-4)	2011	Skyline	2	Farmingdale State	20–8 (14–4)	4
Spalding	20-7 (15-1)	Never	SLIAC	1	Eureka	18-9 (12-4)	2
Calvin	24–3 (13-1)	2007	Michigan	1	Hope	18-9 (12–4)	2
Marietta	20-7 (14-4)	2011	Ohio	2	Mount Union	13-15 (9-9)	4
St. Vincent	23-5 (15-1)	Never	Presidents'	1	Thomas More	23-5 (14-2)	2
Northwestern (Minn.)	21-6 (12-2)	2012	Upper Midwest	1	Bethany Lutheran	12-14 (9-5)	2
UW-Whitewater	23-4 (13-3)	2012	Wisconsin	2	UW-Platteville	19-9 (10-6)	5
North Central (Ill.)	24-3 (11-3)	2012	CCIW	1	Augustana	19-8 (8-6)	4
Whitworth	24-3 (14-2)	2012	Northwest	1	Whitman	19-8 (12-4)	2
Redlands	22-5 (15-1)	2011	SCIAC	1	Claremont-Mudd-Scripps	18-8 (13-3)	2
Amherst	25-2 (10-0)	2012	NESCAC	1	**Williams**	23-4 (9-1)	2
WPI	25-2 (10-2)	2011	NEWMAC	1	**Springfield**	19-9 (9-3)	3
Morrisville State	21-5 (13-2)	2012	North Eastern	North 1	Wells	13-14 (8-7)	North 2
Concordia (Texas)	23-5 (15-4)	Never	American Southwest	West 2	**Mary Hardin-Baylor**	23-5 (17-2)	West 1
Dubuque	22-6 (9-5)	1990	Iowa	3	Wartburg	15-12 (8-6)	4
St. Thomas	26-1 (19-1)	2012	Minnesota	1	Augsburg	21-7 (14-6)	3
Randolph-Macon	19-9 (11-5)	2012	Old Dominion	4	**Virginia Wesleyan**	21-6 (14-2)	2
Trinity (Texas)	20-7 (12-3)	2012	SCAC	1	Colorado College	16-11 (11-4)	2

=== At-large Bids ===
Conference	School	Appearance	Last Bid	Pool
Southern	Centre	15th	2011	Pool B
UAA	Emory	2nd	1990	Pool C
Old Dominion	Hampden-Sydney	14th	2007	Pool C
CCIW	Illinois Wesleyan	22nd	2012	Pool C
American Southwest	Mary Hardin-Baylor	6th	2012	Pool C
NESCAC	Middlebury	6th	2012	Pool C
NEWMAC	MIT	5th	2012	Pool C
SUNYAC	Plattsburgh State	7th	2010	Pool C
Old Dominion	Randolph	1st	Never	Pool C
UAA	Rochester	14th	2011	Pool C
New Jersey	Rutgers-Newark	2nd	2010	Pool C
NEWMAC	Springfield	6th	2005	Pool C
Empire 8	Stevens	2nd	2007	Pool C
Heartland	Transylvania	9th	2012	Pool C
Wisconsin	UW-Stevens Point	12th	2012	Pool C
Old Dominion	Virginia Wesleyan	13th	2012	Pool C
Capital	Wesley	3rd	2010	Pool C
CCIW	Wheaton (Ill.)	9th	2012	Pool C
NESCAC	Williams	13th	2011	Pool C
North Coast	Wooster	22nd	2012	Pool C

=== Conferences with multiple bids ===
Bids	Conference	Schools
4	Old Dominion	**Randolph-Macon**, Hampden-Sydney, Virginia Wesleyan, Randolph
3	CCIW	**Illinois Wesleyan**, North Central (Ill.), Wheaton (Ill.)
3	NESCAC	**Amherst**, Middlebury, Williams
3	NEWMAC	**WPI**, MIT, Springfield
3	UAA	**Washington U.**, Brandeis, Emory
2	American Southwest	**Concordia (Texas)**, Mary Hardin-Baylor
2	Capital	**St. Mary's (Md.)**, Wesley
2	Empire 8	**Ithaca**, Stevens
2	Heartland	**Rose-Hulman**, Transylvania
2	New Jersey Athletic Conference	**Ramapo**, Rutgers-Newark
2	North Coast	**Ohio Wesleyan**, Wooster
2	SUNYAC	**Cortland State**, Plattsburgh State
2	Wisconsin	**UW-Whitewater**, UW-Stevens Point

All other conferences have only one bid (see Automatic Bids)
NOTE: Teams in bold represent the conference's automatic bid.

== Bids by state ==
Bids	State(s)	Schools
8	Massachusetts	Amherst, Curry, Elms, Fitchburg State, MIT, Springfield, Williams, WPI
8	New York	Cortland State, Hobart, Ithaca, Morrisville State, Plattsburgh State, Rochester, Staten Island, SUNY-Purchase
6	Pennsylvania	Alvernia, Cabrini, Delaware Valley, Dickinson, Penn State-Behrend, St. Vincent
5	Virginia	Christopher Newport, Hampden-Sydney, Randolph, Randolph-Macon, Virginia Wesleyan
4	Illinois	Aurora, Illinois Wesleyan, North Central (Ill.), Wheaton (Ill.)
3	Kentucky	Centre, Spalding, Transylvania
3	New Jersey	Ramapo, Rutgers-Newark, Stevens
3	Ohio	Marietta, Ohio Wesleyan, Wooster
3	Texas	Concordia (Texas), Mary Hardin-Baylor, Trinity (Texas)
3	Wisconsin	St. Norbert, UW-Stevens Point, UW-Whitewater
2	Minnesota	Northwestern (Minn.), St. Thomas
1	California	Redlands
1	Connecticut	Albertus Magnus
1	Delaware	Wesley
1	District of Columbia	Catholic
1	Georgia	Emory
1	Iowa	Dubuque
1	Indiana	Rose-Hulman
1	Maine	Husson
1	Maryland	St. Mary's (Md.)
1	Michigan	Calvin
1	Missouri	Washington U.
1	Rhode Island	Rhode Island College
1	Vermont	Middlebury
1	Washington	Whitworth
