= 2012 NCAA Division III men's basketball tournament qualifying teams =

This is a list of qualifying teams for the 2012 NCAA Division III men's basketball tournament. A total of 62 teams entered the tournament. Forty-one of the teams earned automatic bids by winning their conference tournaments. The automatic bid of the University Athletic Association, which does not conduct a postseason tournament, went to its regular season champion. The remaining twenty teams were granted at-large bids, which are extended by the NCAA Selection Committee.

== Qualifying teams ==
=== Automatic bids ===
Automatic bids to the tournament were granted for winning a conference championship tournament, except for the automatic bid of the University Athletic Association given to the regular season champion. Seeds listed were seeds within the conference tournaments. Runners-up in bold face were given at-large berths.

Automatic bids
| Qualifying School | Record (Conf.) | Last app. | Conference | Finish | Regular season Second Place | Second place Record (Conf.) | Finish |
|---|---|---|---|---|---|---|---|
| Washington U. | 20-7 (11-3) | 2010 | UAA | 1st | **NYU** | 21-6 (10-4) | 2nd |
| Qualifying School | Record (Conf.) | Last app. | Conference | Seed | Conf. Finals Runner-Up | Runner-up Record (Conf.) | Runner-up Seed |
| Cabrini | 31-2 (18-0) | 2011 | Colonial States | 1 | Keystone | 21-6 (14-4) | 2 |
| William Paterson | 24-4 (11–2) | 2010 | New Jersey | N1 | Richard Stockton | 20-9 (12-1) | S1 |
| Salem State | 20-8 (10-2) | 2010 | MASCAC | 1 | Bridgewater State | 16-12 (9-3) | 2 |
| Misericordia | 21-7 (11-3) | Never | MAC-Freedom | 1 | Wilkes | 17-10 (9-5) | 2 |
| Endicott | 20-9 (12-6) | 2006 | Commonwealth Coast | 2 | Salve Regina | 21-10 (15-3) | 1 |
| Albertus Magnus | 28-2 (18-0) | 2010 | Great Northeast | 1 | Anna Maria | 14-15 (10-8) | 6 |
| Becker | 24-5 (16-0) | 2011 | New England | 1 | Elms | 18-11 (11-5) | 2 |
| Castleton State | 19-10 (15-3) | 2004 | North Atlantic | 1 | Colby-Sawyer College | 20-8 (15-3) | 2 |
| Messiah | 20-7 (12-2) | 2007 | MAC-Commonwealth | 1 | Lycoming | 19-8 (8-6) | 3 |
| Medaille | 25-3 (17-1) | 2010 | Allegheny Mountain | 1 | Penn State-Behrend | 16-12 (13-5) | 3 |
| Ithaca | 14-14 (9-5) | 2011 | Empire 8 | 4 | Nazareth | 18-8 (10-4) | 2 |
| Skidmore | 19-9 (11-5) | 2011 | Liberty | 2 | **Hobart** | 23-6 (14-2) | 1 |
| Edgewood | 22-6 (14-2) | 2010 | Northern | 3 | Lakeland | 21-7 (12-4) | 5 |
| York (Pa.) | 18-11 (10-6) | 2006 | Capital | 4 | Mary Washington | 18-9 (12-4) | 2 |
| Carroll | 17-10 (10-8) | 2011 | Midwest | 4 | St. Norbert | 16-9 (12-6) | 3 |
| Oswego State | 26-4 (18-0)) | 2011 | SUNYAC | 1 | Cortland State | 22-7 (14-4 | 2 |
| Staten Island | 26-5 (11-0) | 2002 | CUNYAC | 1 | Medgar Evers | 17-12 (5-6) | 6 |
| Eastern Connecticut | 24-5 (11-3) | 2000 | Little East | 1 | **Rhode Island College** | 23-7 (10-4) | 3 |
| Christopher Newport | 23-5 (12-0) | 2011 | USA South | 1 | Greensboro | 18-10 (7-5) | 3 |
| Scranton | 23-8 (11-3) | 2011 | Landmark | 1 | Juniata | 19-10 (9-5) | 3 |
| Franklin and Marshall | 28-3 (16-2) | 2011 | Centennial | 1 | Muhlenberg College | 18-9 (11-7) | 2 |
| Rose-Hulman | 20-9 (11-7) | 2012 | Heartland | 3 | **Transylvania** | 23-5 (16-2) | 1 |
| Wooster | 26-5 (12-4) | 2011 | North Coast | 2 | Denison | 14-14 (9-7) | 5 |
| Farmingdale State | 23-6 (16-2) | 2009 | Skyline | 2 | SUNY Purchase | 14-14 (10-8) | 4 |
| Westminster (Mo.) | 17-11 (11-5) | 2010 | SLIAC | 2 | MacMurray | 14-13 (10-6) | 4 |
| Hope | 27-2 (14-0) | 2011 | Michigan | 1 | Adrian | 17-9 (9-5) | 2 |
| Capital | 19-10 (13-5) | 2009 | Ohio | 2 | Wilmington (Ohio) | 15-13 (10-8) | 5 |
| Bethany | 25-4 (14-2) | 2011 | Presidents' | 1 | Thomas More | 20-8 (13-3) | 3 |
| Northwestern (Minn.) | 17-11 (10-4) | 2012 | Upper Midwest | 2 | Bethany Lutheran | 16-11 (13-1) | 1 |
| UW-River Falls | 20-8 (12-4) | 2011 | Wisconsin | 2 | **UW-Whitewater** | 29-4 (13-3) | 1 |
| North Central (Ill.) | 22-8 (12-2) | 2006 | CCIW | 1 | **Wheaton (Ill.)** | 23-7 (11-3) | 2 |
| Whitworth | 26-4 (15-1) | 2011 | Northwest | 1 | Puget Sound | 20-7 (11-5) | 2 |
| Claremont-Mudd-Scripps | 24-4 (12-2) | 2010 | SCIAC | 1 | Pomona-Pitzer | 16-10 (10-4) | 2 |
| Amherst | 26-3 (10-0) | 2011 | NESCAC | 1 | **Middlebury** | 26-4 (9-1) | 2 |
| MIT | 29-2 (11-1) | 2011 | NEWMAC | 1 | Springfield | 17-10 (7-5) | 3 |
| Morrisville State | 19-9 (14-1) | Never | North Eastern | N1 | Penn State-Harrisburg | 20-7 (12-2) | S1 |
| McMurry | 20-9 (13-8) | 2011 | American Southwest | W3 | Hardin-Simmons | 21-7 (16-5) | W2 |
| Buena Vista | 17-11 (11-5) | 2008 | Iowa | 2 | Coe | 19-8 (12-4) | 1 |
| St. Thomas | 22-7 (16-4) | 2011 | Minnesota | 1 | **Gustavus Adolphus** | 20-8 (16-4) | 2 |
| Virginia Wesleyan | 27-4 (14-2) | 2012 | Old Dominion | 1 | Randolph | 15-14 (7-9) | 6 |
| Trinity (Texas) | 21-9 (12-4) | 2012 | SCAC | W1 | Centre | 18-9 (10-6) | E3 |

=== At-large Bids ===
| Conference | School | Appearance | Last Bid | Pool |
|---|---|---|---|---|
| Great South | Maryville (Tenn.) | 15th | 2010 | Pool B |
| SCAC | Birmingham-Southern | 1st | 2012 | Pool C |
| Minnesota | Gustavus Adolphus | 13th | 2005 | Pool C |
| Empire 8 | Hartwick | 6th | 2011 | Pool C |
| Liberty | Hobart | 2nd | 2001 | Pool C |
| CCIW | Illinois Wesleyan | 21st | 2011 | Pool C |
| American Southwest | Mary Hardin-Baylor | 5th | 2011 | Pool C |
| NESCAC | Middlebury | 5th | 2011 | Pool C |
| UAA | NYU | 26th | 2006 | Pool C |
| North Coast | Ohio Wesleyan | 3rd | 2008 | Pool C |
| Old Dominion | Randolph-Macon | 12th | 2011 | Pool C |
| Little East | Rhode Island College | 9th | 2011 | Pool C |
| Skyline | St. Joseph's-Long Island | 2nd | 2009 | Pool C |
| Capital | St. Mary's (Md.) | 4th | 2011 | Pool C |
| Heartland | Transylvania | 8th | 2009 | Pool C |
| Wisconsin | UW-Stevens Point | 11th | 2011 | Pool C |
| Wisconsin | UW-Whitewater | 17th | 2011 | Pool C |
| Little East | Western Connecticut | 12th | 2011 | Pool C |
| CCIW | Wheaton (Ill.) | 8th | 2010 | Pool C |
| North Coast | Wittenberg | 26th | 2011 | Pool C |

=== Conferences with multiple bids ===
| Bids | Conference | Schools |
|---|---|---|
| 3 | CCIW | **North Central (Ill.)**, Illinois Wesleyan, Wheaton (Ill.) |
| 3 | Little East | **Eastern Connecticut**, Rhode Island College, Western Connecticut |
| 3 | North Coast | **Wooster**, Ohio Wesleyan, Wittenberg |
| 3 | Wisconsin | **UW_River Falls**, UW-Stevens Point, UW-Whitewater |
| 2 | American Southwest | **McMurry**, Mary Hardin-Baylor |
| 2 | Capital | **York (Pa.)**, St. Mary's (Md.) |
| 2 | Empire 8 | **Ithaca**, Hartwick |
| 2 | Heartland | **Rose-Hulman**, Transylvania |
| 2 | Liberty | **Skidmore**, Hobart |
| 2 | Minnesota | **St. Thomas**, Gustavus Adolphus |
| 2 | NESCAC | **Amherst**, Middlebury |
| 2 | Old Dominion | **Virginia Wesleyan**, Randolph-Macon |
| 2 | SCAC | **Trinity (Texas)**, Birmingham Southern |
| 2 | Skyline | **Farmingdale State**, St. Joseph's-Long Island |
| 2 | UAA | **Washington U.**, NYU |

All other conferences have only one bid (see Automatic Bids)
NOTE: Teams in bold represent the conference's automatic bid.

== Bids by state ==
| Bids | State(s) | Schools |
|---|---|---|
| 11 | New York | Farmingdale State, Hartwick, Hobart, Ithaca, Medaille, Morrisville State, NYU, Oswego State, Skidmore, St. Joseph's-Long Island, Staten Island |
| 6 | Pennsylvania | Cabrini, Franklin and Marshall, Messiah, Misericordia, Scranton, York (Pa.) |
| 5 | Massachusetts | Amherst, Becker, Endicott, MIT, Salem State |
| 5 | Wisconsin | Carroll, Edgewood, UW-River Falls, UW-Stevens Point, UW-Whitewater |
| 4 | Ohio | Capital, Ohio Wesleyan, Wittenberg, Wooster |
| 3 | Connecticut | Albertus Magnus, Eastern Connecticut, Western Connecticut |
| 3 | Illinois | Illinois Wesleyan, North Central (Ill.), Wheaton (Ill.) |
| 3 | Minnesota | Gustavus Adolphus, Northwestern (Minn.), St. Thomas |
| 3 | Texas | Mary Hardin-Baylor, McMurry, Trinity (Texas) |
| 3 | Virginia | Christopher Newport, Randolph-Macon, Virginia Wesleyan |
| 2 | Missouri | Washington U., Westminster (Mo.) |
| 2 | Vermont | Castleton State, Middlebury |
| 1 | Alabama | Birmingham-Southern |
| 1 | California | Claremont-Mudd-Scripps |
| 1 | Iowa | Buena Vista |
| 1 | Indiana | Rose-Hulman |
| 1 | Kentucky | Transylvania |
| 1 | Maryland | St. Mary's (Md.) |
| 1 | Michigan | Hope |
| 1 | New Jersey | William Paterson |
| 1 | Rhode Island | Rhode Island College |
| 1 | Tennessee | Maryville (Tenn.) |
| 1 | Washington | Whitworth |
| 1 | West Virginia | Bethany |
