= Kurucz =

Kurucz is a Hungarian surname. Notable people with the surname include:

- Ivett Kurucz (born 1994), Hungarian handballer
- Levente Kurucz (born 2003), Hungarian canoeist
- Péter Kurucz (born 1988), Hungarian footballer
- Tom Kurucz (born c. 1947), American football coach

== See also ==
- Kuruc
