= Greg Quick =

Canadian football coach (born 1956)

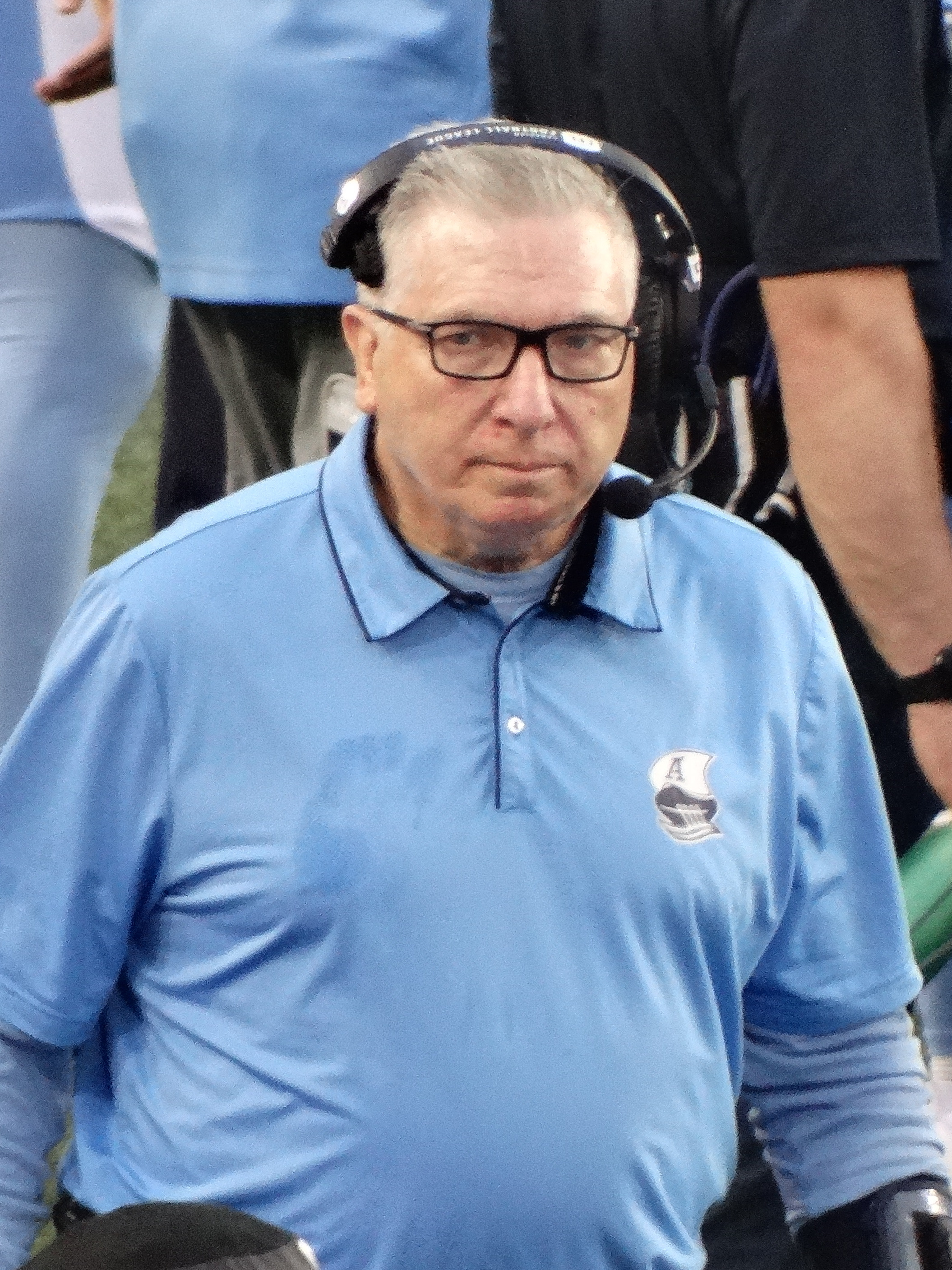
- Quick with the Toronto Argonauts in 2026

Current position
- Title: Defensive coordinator Linebackers coach
- Team: Toronto Argonauts

Biographical details
- Born: November 30, 1956 (age 69)

Playing career
- late 1970s: Baldwin–Wallace
- Position: Center

Coaching career (HC unless noted)
- 1979–1983: Emporia State (DC/OL/DB)
- 1984: St. Edward HS (LB)
- 1985: Heidelberg (OC/OL)
- 1986: New Mexico State (LB)
- 1987: Edinboro (PA) (DC/DB)
- 1988: Claremont-Mudd-Scripps (DC)
- 1989–1993: Chicago
- 1994–1998: St. Norbert
- 1999–2002: San Diego (OC/OL)
- 2003–2008: Concord
- 2010–2011: Toronto Argonauts (LB)
- 2014: Montreal Alouettes (LB)
- 2015: Saskatchewan Roughriders (DC)
- 2016–2017: Montreal Alouettes (LB)
- 2018: Toronto Argonauts (LB)
- 2021–2026: Montreal Alouettes (LB)
- 2026–present: Toronto Argonauts (DC/LB)

Head coaching record
- Overall: 48–112

Accomplishments and honors

Championships
- Grey Cup champion (2023); MWC North Division (1994)

Phillip "Greg" Quick (born November 30, 1956) is an American football coach who is the defensive coordinator and linebackers coach for the Toronto Argonauts of the Canadian Football League (CFL). He is formerly a gridiron football player. Quick served as the head football coach at the University of Chicago (1989–1993), St. Norbert College (1994–1998), and Concord University (2003–2008), compiling a career college football record of 48–112. He has also served as the Director of Global Scouting for the CFL. In this capacity, he was responsible for attending combines held in different countries and identifying global players that could play in the CFL.

== Coaching career ==
It was announced on January 8, 2026, that Quick had joined the Toronto Argonauts to serve as the team's defensive coordinator and linebackers coach.

== Head coaching record ==
Year	Team	Overall	Conference	Standing	Bowl/playoffs
Chicago Maroons (University Athletic Association) (1989–1993)
1989	Chicago	2–7	0–3		
1990	Chicago	1–9	0–4		
1991	Chicago	0–10	0–4		
1992	Chicago	3–7	1–3		
1993	Chicago	5–5	2–2		
Chicago:		11–38	3–16		
St. Norbert Green Knights (Midwest Conference) (1994–1998)
1994	St. Norbert	6–3	4–1	T–1st (North)	
1995	St. Norbert	1–8	1–4	5th (North)	
1996	St. Norbert	5–4	4–1	2nd (North)	
1997	St. Norbert	4–5	2–3	T–3rd (North)	
1998	St. Norbert	5–5	5–4	5th	
St. Norbert:		21–25	16–13		
Concord Mountain Lions (West Virginia Intercollegiate Athletic Conference) (2003–2008)
2003	Concord	3–8	2–5	T–7th	
2004	Concord	5–6	4–3	T–3rd	
2005	Concord	4–7	3–5	6th	
2006	Concord	3–8	3–4	9th	
2007	Concord	1–10	0–8	9th	
2008	Concord	0–11	0–8	9th	
Concord:		16–49	9–37		
Total:		48–112			
National championship Conference title Conference division title or championship game berth
