= Parrinello =

Parrinello is an Italian surname. Notable people with the surname include:

- Antonino Parrinello (born 1988), Italian cyclist
- Michele Parrinello (born 1945), Italian physicist
- Rich Parrinello (born 1950), American football coach
- Tom Parrinello (born 1989), English footballer
- Vittorio Parrinello (born 1983), Italian boxer

== See also ==
- Car–Parrinello molecular dynamics
