= Mick Ewing =

American football coach (1920–2019)

Biographical details
- Born: April 7, 1920; Aurora, Illinois, U.S.
- Died: January 25, 2019 (aged 98)

Coaching career (HC unless noted)
- 1983–1987: Chicago

Head coaching record
- Overall: 18–26

Harry G. Ewing (April 7, 1920 – January 25, 2019), better known as Mick Ewing, was an American football coach. Ewing was the head football coach at the University of Chicago. He held that position for five seasons, from 1983 until 1987. His coaching record at Chicago was 18–26. Ewing died on January 25, 2019, at the age of 98.

== Head coaching record ==
Year	Team	Overall	Conference	Standing	Bowl/playoffs
Chicago Maroons (Midwest Conference) (1983–1986)
1983	Chicago	2–7	0–4	5th (North)	
1984	Chicago	3–6	1–6	6th (North)	
1985	Chicago	5–4	3–4	T–3rd (North)	
1986	Chicago	3–6	2–5	T–5th (North)	
Chicago Maroons (University Athletic Association) (1987)
1987	Chicago	5–3			
Chicago:		18–26			
Total:		18–26			
