= 1954 Carleton Knights football team =

American college football season

1954 Carleton Knights football

MWC champion
- Conference: Midwest Conference
- Record: 8–0 (8–0 MWC)
- Head coach: Walter Hass (15th season)
- Home stadium: Laird Stadium

1954 Midwest Conference football standings
	Conf.					Overall
Team	W		L		T	W		L		T
Carleton $	8	–	0	–	0	8	–	0	–	0
Lawrence	6	–	2	–	0	6	–	2	–	0
St. Olaf	5	–	1	–	2	5	–	1	–	2
Coe	4	–	3	–	1	4	–	3	–	1
Grinnell	2	–	4	–	2	2	–	4	–	2
Ripon	2	–	4	–	2	2	–	4	–	2
Cornell (IA)	2	–	5	–	1	2	–	5	–	1
Monmouth (IL)	2	–	6	–	0	2	–	6	–	0
Knox	1	–	7	–	0	1	–	7	–	0
$ – Conference champion

The 1954 Carleton Knights football team represented Carleton College as a member of the Midwest Conference (MWC) during the 1954 college football season. In their 16th year under head coach Walter Hass, the Knights compiled an 8–0 record (also 8–0 in conference games), won the MWC championship, and outscored opponents by a total of 139 to 59. It was Carleton's first MWC championship since 1936.

Four Carleton players were selected by the MWC coaches as first-team players on the 1954 all-conference football team: quarterback Dick Scott; back Ted Smebakken; tackle Dick McAuliffe; and guard Dick Lundekugel.

== Schedule ==
Date	Opponent	Site	Result	Attendance	Source
September 18	Cornell (IA)	Northfield, MN	W 21–6		
September 25	at Knox	Galesburg, IL	W 14–7		
October 2	Monmouth (IL)	Northfield, MN	W 20–0		
October 9	St. Olaf	Northfield, MN	W 14–13	6,147	
October 16	Coe	Northfield, MN	W 20–14		
October 23	at Grinnell	Grinnell, IA	W 16–6	1,500	
October 30	Lawrence	Northfield, MN	W 14–7		
November 6	at Ripon	Ripon, WI	W 20–6		
