= Howard Sachar =

American historian (1928–2018)

- Born: Howard Morley Sachar; February 10, 1928; St. Louis, Missouri, U.S.
- Died: April 18, 2018 (aged 90); Kensington, Maryland, U.S.
- Education: Swarthmore College; Harvard University (MA, PhD)
- Occupation: Historian
- Spouse: Eliana Steimatzky
- Children: 3
- Father: Abram L. Sachar
- Relatives: Edward J. Sachar (brother); David B. Sachar (brother)

Howard Morley Sachar (February 10, 1928 – April 18, 2018) was an American historian. He was Professor Emeritus of History and International Affairs at the George Washington University in Washington, D.C., and the author of 16 books, as well as numerous articles in scholarly journals, on the subjects of Middle Eastern and Modern European history. His writings, which have been published in six languages, are widely regarded as solid reference works.

== Early, personal life and education ==
Howard Morley Sachar was born to historian and academic administrator Abram L. Sachar and his wife, Thelma Horwitz, during his father's tenure as a professor of history at the University of Illinois at Urbana–Champaign. He was born in St. Louis, Missouri, and raised in Champaign, Illinois. He was the eldest of three brothers; his brother Edward J. Sachar became a pioneering biological psychiatrist and David B. Sachar became a gastroenterologist.

Sachar completed his undergraduate education at Swarthmore College and earned his M.A. and Ph.D. degrees in history at Harvard University.

He married Eliana Steimatzky and had three children: Sharon, Michele and Daniel.

== Career ==
Sachar was a full-time faculty member of the Department of History and the Elliott School of International Affairs at the George Washington University for 40 years. He was also a visiting professor at Hebrew University and Tel Aviv University, and a guest lecturer at nearly 150 other universities in North America, Europe, South Africa and Egypt. In 1996 he was awarded an honorary degree of Doctor of Humane Letters from Hebrew Union College-Jewish Institute of Religion. He also received the National Jewish Book Award on two separate occasions. In 1977, for A History of Israel: From the Rise of Zionism to Our Time and in 1982 for Egypt and Israel.

In 1961 Sachar founded Brandeis University's Jacob Hiatt Institute in Jerusalem, one of the first study-abroad programs in Israel, and served as its director until 1964. Through his connections with the United States Foreign Service, where he worked as a consultant and lecturer on Middle Eastern Affairs, he was able to obtain funding for the Jacob Hiatt Institute from the U.S. State Department in 1965.

He was a member of the American Historical Association as well as one dozen editorial boards and commissions. In addition to his books, he was editor-in-chief of the 39-volume The Rise of Israel: A documentary history.

Howard Sachar died at his home in Kensington, Maryland, on April 18, 2018, aged 90.

== Political position ==
Sachar was a member of the advisory council of the pro-peace lobbying organization J Street and an advocate of the two-state solution for the Israeli–Palestinian conflict.

== Works ==
- The Course of Modern Jewish History (1959; updated 1990) Lib. of Cong. Cat. No. 58-67-57
- Aliyah: The peoples of Israel (1961) Lib. of Cong. Cat. No. 61-12017
- From the Ends of the Earth: The peoples of Israel (1964) Lib. of Cong. Cat. No. 64-12064
- The Emergence of the Middle East: 1914–1924 (1969) Lib. of Cong. Cat. No. 76-79349
- Europe Leaves the Middle East, 1936–1954 (1972)
- A History of Israel: From the rise of Zionism to our time (1976; 3rd edition 2007)
- The Man on the Camel: A novel (1980)
- Egypt and Israel (1981)
- Diaspora: An inquiry into the contemporary Jewish world (1985)
- A History of Israel, Volume II: From the aftermath of the Yom Kippur War (1987)
- The Rise of Israel: A documentary record from the nineteenth century to 1948 : a facsimile series reproducing over 1,900 documents in 39 volumes, Volume 1 (1987)
- A History of the Jews in America (1992)
- Farewell Espana: The world of the Sephardim remembered (1994; reprinted 1995)
- Israel and Europe: An Appraisal in History (1998; reprinted 2000)
- Dreamland: Europeans and Jews in the aftermath of the Great War (2002; reprinted 2003)
- A History of the Jews in the Modern World (2005; reprinted 2006)
- The Assassination of Europe, 1918-1942: A Political History (2004)
