= Bob Lombardi =

American football coach (1938–2021)

Biographical details
- Born: June 3, 1938; Chicago, Illinois, U.S.
- Died: May 28, 2021 (aged 82); New Lenox, Illinois, U.S.

Coaching career (HC unless noted)
- 1961–1966: Homewood-Flossmoor HS (IL) (assistant)
- 1967–1975: Homewood-Flossmoor HS (IL)
- 1976–1978: Chicago
- 1979–1997: Rich East HS (IL)

Head coaching record
- Overall: 9–15 (college)

Robert Edward Lombardi (June 3, 1938 – May 28, 2021) was American football coach and educator. He served as the head football coach at the University of Chicago for three seasons, from 1976 to 1978, compiling a record of 9–15. He is the grandfather of Michigan Panthers quarterback Rocky Lombardi.

Lombardi was born on June 3, 1938, in the South Side of Chicago. He attended Knox College in Galesburg, Illinois, where he met his wife, Melinda, the daughter of football coach and athletic director, Walter Hass. Lombardi began his career in 1961 at Homewood-Flossmoor High School in Flossmoor, Illinois, as a teach of economics and math and assistant football coach. In 1967, he was promoted to head football coach at Homewood-Flossmoor. Lombardi succeeded his father-in-law, Hass, as head football coach at the University of Chicago in 1976. He was also appointed associated profession in the university's Department of Physical Education.

In 1979 he was hired as head football coach and physical education teacher at Rich East High School in Park Forest, Illinois. He remained head football coach at Rich East until 1997. Lombardi died on May 28, 2021, at his home in New Lenox, Illinois.

== Head coaching record ==
=== College ===
| Year | Team | Overall | Conference | Standing | Bowl/playoffs |
|---|---|---|---|---|---|
Chicago Maroons (Midwest Conference) (1976–1978)
| 1976 | Chicago | 4–4 | 1–3 | T–3rd (East) | |
| 1977 | Chicago | 2–6 | 1–3 | 4th (East) | |
| 1978 | Chicago | 3–5 | 1–3 | 4th (Blue) | |
| Chicago: | | 9–15 | 1–3 | | |
| Total: | | 9–15 | | | |
