= Todd Gilcrist Jr. =

American football coach (born 1989)

Biographical details
- Born: February 20, 1989 (age 37); Hampton, Virginia, U.S.

Playing career
- 2007–2008: Duquesne
- 2009–2011: Pittsburgh
- Position: Wide receiver

Coaching career (HC unless noted)
- 2012: Maine Maritime (DB)
- 2013: Thiel (WR)
- 2014: Carnegie Mellon (WR)
- 2015–2016: Columbia (RB)
- 2017–2018: Columbia (WR)
- 2019–2021: Holy Cross (WR)
- 2022–2023: Chicago
- 2025: Averett (OC/WR)

Head coaching record
- Overall: 13–7

Todd Conrad Gilcrist Jr. (born February 20, 1989) is an American college football coach. He most recently served as the offensive coordinator and wide receivers coach for Averett University, positions he held in 2025. He was the head football coach for the University of Chicago from 2022 to 2023. He also coached for Maine Maritime, Thiel, Carnegie Mellon, Columbia, and Holy Cross. He played college football for Duquesne and Pittsburgh.

== Head coaching record ==
Year	Team	Overall	Conference	Standing	Bowl/playoffs
Chicago Maroons (Midwest Conference) (2022–2023)
2022	Chicago	7–3	6–3	4th	
2023	Chicago	6–4	6–3	T–3rd	
Chicago:		13–7	12–6		
Total:		13–7			
