= Robert Larsen (American football) =

American football coach and administrator (1931–2019)

Biographical details
- Born: June 9, 1931
- Died: December 23, 2019 (aged 88); Fox Point, Wisconsin, U.S.

Playing career
- c. 1955: Carthage
- Position: Quarterback

Coaching career (HC unless noted)
- 1956–1957: Barneveld HS (WI)
- 1958: Kendall HS (WI)
- 1959–1962: Mount Horeb Union HS (WI)
- 1963–1976: Hartford Union HS (WI)
- 1977: Carroll (WI)
- 1978–1979: Carroll (WI) (assistant)
- 1980–1982: Chicago
- 1983–1986: Campbellsport HS (WI)
- 1989–1999: Arrowhead HS (WI) (OC)

Administrative career (AD unless noted)
- 1977–1980: Carroll (WI)
- 1980–1983: Chicago

Head coaching record
- Overall: 7–28–1 (college)

Robert Vogt Larsen (June 9, 1931 – December 23, 2019) was an American football coach and college athletics administrator. He served as the head football coach at Carroll College—now known as Carroll University— in Waukesha, Wisconsin in 1977 and the University of Chicago from 1980 to 1982, compiling a career college football coaching record of 7–28–1. Larsen was also the athletic director at Carroll from 1977 to 1980 and Chicago from 1980 to 1983. He played college football at Carthage College in Kenosha, Wisconsin and coached high school football as a number of schools in the state of Wisconsin.

== Early life and playing career ==
Larsen attended Austin High School in Chicago, where he played football, basketball, and baseball. He moved on to Carthage College in Kenosha, Wisconsin, where he played college football. Larsen later earned a master's degree from the University of Wisconsin–Madison.

== Coaching career ==
=== Early coaching career ===
Larsen began his coaching career at the high school level in the state of Wisconsin. He coached at Barneveld High School in Barneveld, Kendall High School in Kendall, Monroe County, and Mount Horeb High School in Mount Horeb. In 1963, Larsen was hired as head football coach at Hartford Union High School in Hartford, Wisconsin.

=== Carroll ===
In June 1977, Larsen was hired as the athletic director and head football coach at Carroll College—now known as Carroll University—in Waukesha, Wisconsin. He served as head football coach at Carroll for one season, in 1977, compiling a record of 4–5, before he was replaced by Mark W. Williams. Larsen remained as Carroll as athletic director and assistant football coach until 1980.

=== Chicago ===
In 1980, Larsen became the head football coach and athletic director at the University of Chicago. In three seasons as head coach of the Chicago Maroons football team, he compiled a record of 3–23–1.

=== Later coaching career ===
In July 1983, Larsen was hired as the head football coach at Campbellsport High School in Campbellsport, Wisconsin. He also taught social studies and coached girls' basketball at Campbellsport. In 1989, Larsen became the offensive coordinator at Arrowhead High School in Hartland, Wisconsin, serving on the staff of head football coach Tom Taraska. Larsen helped lead Arrowhead to three Wisconsin Interscholastic Athletic Association (WIAA) Division I state titles—in 1993, 1994, and 1996—before he retired in 2000.

== Death ==
Larsen died on December 23, 2019, at his home in Fox Point, Wisconsin.

== Head coaching record ==
=== College ===
Year	Team	Overall	Conference	Standing	Bowl/playoffs
Carroll Pioneers (College Conference of Illinois and Wisconsin) (1977)
1977	Carroll	4–5	3–5	8th	
Carroll:		4–5	3–5		
Chicago Maroons (Midwest Conference) (1980–1982)
1980	Chicago	1–8	1–7	T–9th	
1981	Chicago	2–6–1	2–6	T–8th	
1982	Chicago	0–9	0–4	5th (North)	
Chicago:		3–23–1	3–17		
Total:		7–28–1			
