= Edward J. Sachar =

American psychiatrist (1933–1984)

Edward Joel Sachar (June 23, 1933 – March 25, 1984) was an American psychiatrist.

He was born on June 23, 1933, to historian Abram L. Sachar. His eldest brother, Howard Sachar, was also a historian. Another sibling, David B. Sachar, is a gastroenterologist. Edward Sachar attended Harvard College, graduating in 1952, then earned a medical degree from the University of Pennsylvania School of Medicine in 1956. He held an internship at Beth Israel Hospital before completing his residency at Massachusetts General Hospital. Sachar began his academic career at Harvard Medical School, leaving for the Albert Einstein College of Medicine in 1966. He was named full professor in 1972, and joined the Columbia University College of Physicians and Surgeons four years later, as Lawrence C. Kolb Professor of Psychiatry. Sachar had a stroke in 1981, and subsequently retired. He died at the age of 50 on March 25, 1984, at Lenox Hill Hospital in Manhattan.

The Edward J. Sachar Award conferred by the Columbia University College of Physicians and Surgeons was named for him. Recipients of the prize have included Augustus John Rush and Aaron T. Beck.
