= Rich Parrinello =

American football coach (1950–2023)

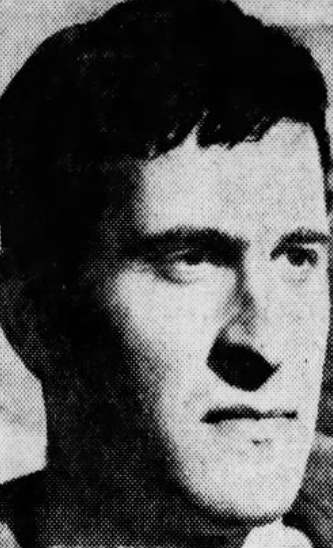
- Parrinello in 1973

Biographical details
- Born: March 3, 1950; Rochester, New York, U.S.
- Died: June 15, 2023 (aged 73); Rochester, New York, U.S.
- Education: University of Rochester (1972)

Playing career
- 1968–1971: Rochester (NY)
- 1973: Buffalo Bills*
- Positions: Quarterback, halfback, wide receiver

Coaching career (HC unless noted)
- 1972–1973: Rochester (NY) (assistant freshmen)
- 1974–1977: Aquinas Institute (NY) (OB)
- 1978–1979: Rochester (NY) (DB/P)
- 1980: Aquinas Institute (NY) (assistant)
- 1981–1983: Aquinas Institute (NY)
- 1984: Rochester (NY) (WR)
- 1985–1987: Rochester (NY) (OL)
- 1988: Chicago
- 1989–1997: Rochester (NY)

Head coaching record
- Overall: 44–49 (college); 20–7 (high school)

Richard J. Parrinello (March 3, 1950 – June 15, 2023) was an American college football coach. He was the head football coach at the University of Chicago in 1988 and at the University of Rochester from 1989 to 1997, compiling a career college football record of 44–49.

== Career ==
Parrinello played high school football for The Aquinas Institute of Rochester. He then played college football for Rochester (NY) as a quarterback, halfback, and wide receiver. He earned all-conference honors in his junior and senior years.

After graduating, Parrinello was hired as a part-time assistant freshmen coach for his alma mater, Rochester.

In 1973, Parrinello spent training camp with the Buffalo Bills of the National Football League (NFL).

Parrinello spent 1974 to 1987 switching between both Aquinas Institute and Rochester; coaching Aquinas from 1974 to 1977 as the offensive backs coach, Rochester from 1978 to 1979 as the defensive backs coach and punting coach, Aquinas in 1980 as an assistant, Aquinas from 1981 to 1983 as the head coach, Rochester in 1984 as the wide receivers coach, and Rochester from 1985 to 1987 as the offensive line coach.

In 1988, Parrinello accepted the head coach position for the University of Chicago, his first coaching position outside of Rochester, New York. He lasted one season with Chicago before returning to Rochester, this time as the team's head coach. He coached the team for nine seasons before resigning after the 1997 season. He amassed a record of 41–43 at Rochester and 44–49 overall.

== Head coaching record ==
=== College ===
Year	Team	Overall	Conference	Standing	Bowl/playoffs
Chicago Maroons (University Athletic Association) (1988)
1988	Chicago	3–6	2–3		
Chicago:		3–6	2–3		
Rochester Yellowjackets (University Athletic Association) (1989–1996)
1989	Rochester	8–2	2–0		
1990	Rochester	5–5	2–2		
1991	Rochester	7–3	3–1		
1992	Rochester	8–1	4–0	1st	
1993	Rochester	5–4	3–1		
1990	Rochester	5–5	2–2		
1994	Rochester	3–6	2–2		
1995	Rochester	4–5	1–3		
Rochester Yellowjackets (University Athletic Association / Upstate Collegiate Athletic Association) (1996–1997)
1996	Rochester	0–9	0–4 / 0–4	5th / 5th	
1997	Rochester	1–8	1–3 / 0–4	/ 5th	
Rochester:		41–43	20–26		
Total:		44–49			
