= Chris Wilkerson =

American football coach

Current position
- Title: Head coach
- Team: Eastern Illinois
- Conference: OVC–Big South
- Record: 17–31
- Annual salary: $185,000

Playing career
- 1991–1994: Eastern Illinois
- Position: Defensive tackle

Coaching career (HC unless noted)
- 1995–2001: Eastern Illinois (assistant)
- 2002: San Jose State (DE)
- 2003–2004: San Jose State (DC/S)
- 2005–2012: Dartmouth (associate HC)
- 2013–2021: Chicago
- 2022–present: Eastern Illinois

Head coaching record
- Overall: 67–57

Accomplishments and honors

Championships
- 1 UAA (2014)

Chris Wilkerson is an American college football coach. He is the head football coach at Eastern Illinois University a position he assumed in 2022, succeeding Adam Cushing. He served as the head football coach at the University of Chicago from 2013 to 2021. A graduate of Eastern Illinois, Wilkerson was an assistant football coach at his alma mater as well as San Jose State University and Dartmouth College.

== Head coaching record ==
Year	Team	Overall	Conference	Standing	Bowl/playoffs
Chicago Maroons (University Athletic Association) (2013–2014)
2013	Chicago	6–4	1–2	3rd	
2014	Chicago	8–1	3–0	1st	
Chicago Maroons (Southern Athletic Association) (2015–2016)
2015	Chicago	6–4	5–3	T–4th	
2016	Chicago	4–6	4–4	T–5th	
Chicago Maroons (Midwest Conference) (2017–2021)
2017	Chicago	6–4	3–2	T–2nd (North)	
2018	Chicago	7–3	4–1	2nd (North)	
2019	Chicago	6–3	3–1	2nd (South)	
2020–21	No team—COVID-19				
2021	Chicago	8–2	7–2	3rd	
Chicago:		51–27	30–15		
Eastern Illinois Panthers (Ohio Valley Conference) (2022)
2022	Eastern Illinois	2–9	1–4	T–6th	
Eastern Illinois Panthers (Big South–OVC Football Association) (2023–present)
2023	Eastern Illinois	8–3	4–2	T–3rd	
2024	Eastern Illinois	3–9	2–6	8th	
2025	Eastern Illinois	3–9	2–6	8th	
2026	Eastern Illinois	1–1	0–0		
Eastern Illinois:		17–31	7–13		
Total:		68–58			
National championship Conference title Conference division title or championship game berth
