= Sakar =

Sakar may refer to:

- Sakar, Nepal
- Sakar, Mali Zvornik, a village in Serbia
- Sakar, Turkmenistan
- Sakar District, Turkmenistan
- Sakar International, an electronics and accessories company.
- Sakar Island, Papua New Guinea
- Sakar Mountain, Bulgaria

== Şakar ==
=== People ===
- Belis Şakar (born 2007), Turkish female swimmer
- Fatma Şakar (born 1999), German*Turkish female footballer
- Zafer Şakar (born 1985), Turkish football player

=== Places ===
- Şəkər, Goychay, Azerbaijan
- Şəkər, Khojavend, Azerbaijan

== See also ==
- Sachar
- Saka (disambiguation)
- Sakaar, a fictional planet in the Marvel Universe
- Sakaar (Marvel Cinematic Universe)
