= Walter Hass =

- Hass as Minnesota captain in 1932

Biographical details
- Born: October 7, 1910
- Died: September 13, 1987 (aged 76); Hendersonville, North Carolina, U.S.

Playing career
- 1930–1932: Minnesota
- Position: Halfback

Coaching career (HC unless noted)
- 1933: Minnesota (freshmen)
- 1934: Manitoba
- 1935–1938: Hibbing
- 1939–1955: Carleton
- 1963–1975: Chicago

Administrative career (AD unless noted)
- 1942–1956: Carleton
- 1956–1976: Chicago

Head coaching record
- Overall: 71–83–5 (varsity college); 21–6–1 (junior college)

Accomplishments and honors

Championships
- 2 MWC (1954)

Walter L. Hass (October 7, 1911 – September 13, 1987) was an American football coach and athletic director. He served in both capacities at the University of Chicago. Hass was also the athletic director and head football coach at Carleton College, head coach at the University of Manitoba and Hibbing Community College, and freshman team coach at his alma mater, the University of Minnesota.

== College career ==
Hass attended the University of Minnesota, where he played football as a halfback. Hass earned three varsity letters from 1930 to 1932 and served as team captain. During his time on the team, he played under three different head coaches: Clarence Spears, Fritz Crisler, and Bernie Bierman. All three were eventually elected to the College Football Hall of Fame. Hass graduated from Minnesota in 1934.

== Coaching career ==
After graduation, Hass served as the freshman team coach at his alma mater for one season. He spent the 1934 season in Canada as head coach of the University of Manitoba football team. He then moved to Hibbing, Minnesota, where he coached Hibbing Community College from 1935 to 1938 and amassed a 21–6–1 record. Hass next coached at Carleton College, a small liberal arts school in Northfield, Minnesota, from 1939 to 1955. His overall record was 62–43–4 with the Carleton football program, and he won a Midwest Conference with 1954's undefeated team. He also served as Carleton's athletic director from 1942 until 1956. Hass coached the "South" team in the Minnesota High School Football All-Star Game each year from 1952 to 1956.

In February 1956, the University of Chicago hired Hass as the replacement to retiring athletic director T. Nelson Metcalf. In May 1956, the University of Chicago faculty reacted negatively to overtures of renewing sponsorship of football on campus. Chancellor Lawrence Kimpton told Hass, "It is always difficult to interpret a faculty action," and predicted that the sport would soon return. In 1959, Hass defended the "sport" of tiddlywinks by stating that its "considerable hazards" included "split thumbnails, flying winks which threaten players and spectators alike."

In 1963, Hass oversaw the reinstatement of football at Chicago at the club level, and he became its first head coach since a university administration hostile to the sport had discontinued it in 1939. The return of football was not universally embraced by the student body, and in the inaugural season, 200 students protested in the middle of Stagg Field, which delayed the game and resulted in four arrests. Later in the decade, however, 1,100 students petitioned the administration for the promotion of Chicago football to the varsity level. The faculty administration and board of trustees approved the move and the team became a member of the non-scholarship Division III in 1969.

He retired as football coach, golf coach, professor, and the Department of Physical Education chairman in the spring of 1976. Former high school football mentor Bob Lombardi succeeded him as head coach. Hass's final record at Chicago was 11–48–1. While at Chicago, he was credited with rebuilding the athletic department, "which had declined to almost nothing" prior to his arrival.

Hass retired to North Carolina in 1977. He died September 13, 1987, in Hendersonville, North Carolina, at the age of 76.

== Head coaching record ==
=== College ===
Year	Team	Overall	Conference	Standing	Bowl/playoffs
Carleton Carls (Midwest Conference) (1939–1940)
1939	Carleton	4–3	3–3	T–4th	
1940	Carleton	6–1–1	4–1–1	2nd	
Carleton Carls (Independent) (1941–1945)
1941	Carleton	2–4–1			
1942	Carleton	5–3			
1943	No team—World War II				
1944	No team—World War II				
1945	No team—World War II				
Carleton Carls/Knights (Midwest Conference) (1946–1955)
1946	Carleton	5–3	3–2	4th	
1947	Carleton	3–3–2	2–2–1	T–4th	
1948	Carleton	6–2	4–2	3rd	
1949	Carleton	4–4	4–2	T–3rd	
1950	Carleton	5–3	4–2	T–4th	
1951	Carleton	4–3	3–3	4th	
1952	Carleton	3–5	3–4	T–5th	
1953	Carleton	2–6	2–5	T–6th	
1954	Carleton	8–0	8–0	1st	
1955	Carleton	5–3	5–2	3rd	
Carleton:		62–43–4	45–28–2		
Chicago Maroons (NCAA College Division / NCAA Division III independent) (1969–1975)
1969	Chicago	2–4			
1970	Chicago	2–5			
1971	Chicago	3–4			
1972	Chicago	1–6			
1973	Chicago	0–6–1			
1974	Chicago	0–8			
1975	Chicago	1–7			
Chicago:		9–40–1			
Total:		71–83–5			
National championship Conference title Conference division title or championship game berth
