= Abram L. Sachar =

Founding president of Brandeis University

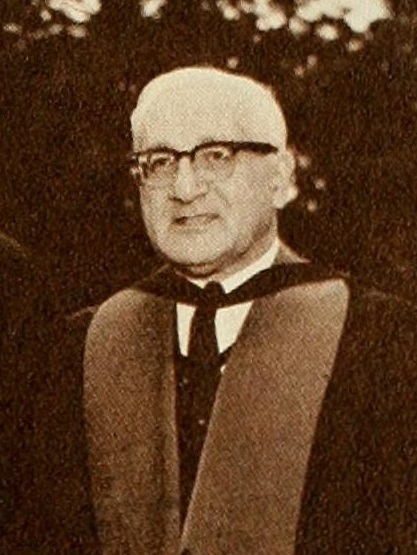
Abram L. Sachar in 1961

Abram Leon Sachar (February 15, 1899 – July 24, 1993) was an American historian and founding president of Brandeis University.

== Early life and education ==
He was born in New York City to Samuel Sachar, a Jewish immigrant from Lithuania, and Sarah Abramowitz, a native of Jerusalem. When he was seven years old, his family moved to St. Louis, Missouri, where his grandfather served as a chief rabbi. He was briefly enlisted for service in World War I, and then attended Washington University in St. Louis, where he earned his B.A. and M.A. degrees in history. During his junior year, he studied languages at Harvard and graduated Phi Beta Kappa in 1920. From 1920 to 1923 he studied at Emmanuel College, Cambridge, in England, where he received his doctorate in history for his thesis on the Victorian House of Lords.

== History professorship ==
Upon his return to the United States, Sachar joined the faculty of the history department at the University of Illinois at Urbana-Champaign, teaching modern European and English history. He remained at this position for the next 24 years.

In 1926, he married Thelma Horwitz, a Phi Beta Kappa graduate of Washington University in St. Louis. They had three sons who rose to prominence in their respective professions: Howard M. Sachar, a distinguished American historian; Edward J. Sachar, a pioneering biological psychiatrist, and David B. Sachar, a gastroenterologist.

Sachar published his first book in 1927; this was followed by several other books in quick succession. He also lectured across the country from the 1920s to the 1990s, and appeared in a weekly educational television lecture show, The Course of Our Times; his analyses of problems in contemporary history were later published in the book of the same title. Sachar remained a working educator, historian, lecturer, and author until his death.

== Hillel leader ==
He became a leader of the B'nai Brith Hillel Foundation, founded at the University of Illinois, serving as director of the Illinois sector from 1929 to 1933, national director of the Hillel Foundation from 1933 to 1947, and chairman of the National Hillel Commission from 1948 to 1955, when he retired to become president of Brandeis University. During his tenure, he helped establish Hillel houses for Jewish students on the campuses of many American universities. He also served as president of the B'nai B'rith Youth Organization (BBYO) from 1945 to 1948.

Concurrently, he served as part-time religious leader of Sinai Temple, a Reform Jewish congregation in Champaign-Urbana.

During World War II, Sachar worked as a radio news analyst in Chicago and New York, commenting on contemporary affairs. He was also involved with attempts to aid Jewish refugees, organizing a program to bring refugee students to the United States.

== University president ==
In 1948, trustees of the newly formed, Jewish-sponsored, nonsectarian Brandeis University in Waltham, Massachusetts, asked Albert Einstein to be their first president. When he refused, their second choice was David Ben-Gurion, who also turned down the offer. Their third choice was Sachar, who had displayed his scholarly credentials and devotion to the Jewish people through previous leadership of the Hillel organization at the University of Illinois, and through his 1930 work, History of the Jews. During his 20-year tenure, Sachar's leadership and fund-raising skills were largely credited for building Brandeis into a major research institution. When he assumed office in 1948, Brandeis had 107 students and 13 faculty members; at the time of his death, it had 3,700 undergraduate and graduate students, and 360 full-time faculty members. Sachar personally raised $160 million for the expansion of the campus from a few buildings on a defunct medical-school campus to a complex of 90 buildings spread over 235 acres. Upon his retirement in 1968, he was named chancellor and then chancellor emeritus of Brandeis University, a title that allowed him to continue his fund-raising activities on behalf of the university. All told, he raised an estimated $250 million for Brandeis.

== Honors ==
He was invited by President Lyndon B. Johnson to serve on the U.S. Advisory Commission on International Education and Cultural Affairs, among other state and national panels; he also served on the U.S. Holocaust Commission. He was also active in several educational and philanthropic boards. He was awarded honorary degrees from more than 30 American colleges and universities.

He died of respiratory failure at his home in Newton, Massachusetts, on July 24, 1993. His wife of 67 years, Thelma, survived him; she died in 1997 and was interred beside him at a special plot, created at their request, near the Sachar International Institute at Brandeis University.

== Works ==
- A History of the Jews (1930; revised 1965)
- Sufferance is the Badge: The Jew in the Contemporary World (1939)
- The Course of Our Times (1972)
- The Redemption of the Unwanted (1984)
- Brandeis University: A Host at Last (1995)
