= Tom Kurucz =

American football coach

Coaching career (HC unless noted)
- 1979: Chicago
- 1982–1986: South Carolina (assistant)

Head coaching record
- Overall: 2–6

Tom Kurucz (born c. 1947) is an American former football coach.

== Coaching career ==
=== Chicago ===
Kurucz was the head football coach at the University of Chicago. He held that position for the 1979 season. His coaching record at Chicago was 2–6.

=== Assistant coaching and steroids ===
Kurucz later became an assistant coach for the South Carolina Gamecocks. During his time at South Carolina, he was implicated in a steroid use scandal after an article in Sports Illustrated alleged that steroid use was widespread in the program. After the article, Kurucz and two other assistant coaches, pleaded guilty to charges of illegally buying steroids. Kurucz also pleaded guilty to providing steroids to players.

Kurucz was the offensive coordinator at Baker University (Kans.) for two seasons, 1996–1997.

== Head coaching record ==
Year	Team	Overall	Conference	Standing	Bowl/playoffs
Chicago Maroons (Midwest Conference) (1979)
1979	Chicago	2–6	1–3	T–4th (Red)	
Chicago:		2–6	1–3		
Total:		2–6			
