= Dick Maloney (American football) =

American football coach (born 1950)

Biographical details
- Born: July 21, 1950 (age 76)

Coaching career (HC unless noted)
- 1974: Albany (DL)
- 1975: Maryville (assistant)
- 1976: Boston College (assistant)
- 1977–1981: Boston University (OL)
- 1982–1985: Dartmouth (OL)
- 1986–1990: Penn (OC)
- 1991–1993: Ottawa Rough Riders (OL)
- 1994–2012: Chicago
- 2013–2017: RPI (DC/RC)
- 2018–2025: Augustana (IL) (DC/LB)

Head coaching record
- Overall: 94–82

Accomplishments and honors

Championships
- 4 UAA (1999, 2000 2005, 2010)

Richard Maloney (born July 21, 1950) is an American former gridiron football coach. He most recently served as the defensive coordinator and linebackers coach for Augustana College, positions he held from 2018 until his retirement in 2025. Maloney served as head football coach at the University of Chicago from 1994 to 2012. A five-time University Athletic Association (UAA) Coach of the Year, Maloney guided the Maroons to four UAA championships and notched a 94–82 overall record. His .534 winning percentage ranks second all-time at Chicago, trailing only the legendary Amos Alonzo Stagg. During his tenure, Maloney built a program recognized for not only athletic emphasis but academic excellence.

In 2013, Maloney joined the staff of Rensselaer Polytechnic Institute (RPI) as defensive coordinator and recruiting coordinator. Historically an offensive-minded coach, within two years Maloney built a defensive unit that ranked 13th in total defense nationally.

His 2019 Augustana ToughGuy defense repeated success, like the RPI ones by earning 5 national rankings in the DIII's Top 30.

== Head coaching record ==
Year	Team	Overall	Conference	Standing	Bowl/playoffs
Chicago Maroons (University Athletic Association) (1994–2012)
1994	Chicago	5–5	2–2		
1995	Chicago	8–2	2–2		
1996	Chicago	4–5	1–3		
1997	Chicago	5–4	1–3		
1998	Chicago	7–2	4–0	1st	
1999	Chicago	5–4	1–3		
2000	Chicago	7–2	4–0	1st	
2001	Chicago	6–3	1–3		
2002	Chicago	4–5	2–2		
2003	Chicago	2–7	1–3		
2004	Chicago	3–6	0–3	4th	
2005	Chicago	5–4	3–0	1st	
2006	Chicago	4–5	0–3	4th	
2007	Chicago	4–5	0–3	4th	
2008	Chicago	3–6	1–2	T–2nd	
2009	Chicago	5–4	1–2	T–2nd	
2010	Chicago	8–2	3–0	1st	
2011	Chicago	5–5	0–3	4th	
2012	Chicago	4–6	0–3	4th	
Chicago:		94–82	27–40		
Total:		94–82			
