= Liberty League =

Division III intercollegiate athletic conference

- Formerly: Upstate Collegiate Athletic Association
- Association: NCAA
- Founded: 1995
- Commissioner: Tracy King
- Sports fielded: 26; men's: 14; women's: 13
- Division: Division III
- No. of teams: 12
- Headquarters: Troy, New York
- Region: Upstate New York
- Website: libertyleagueathletics.com

Locations
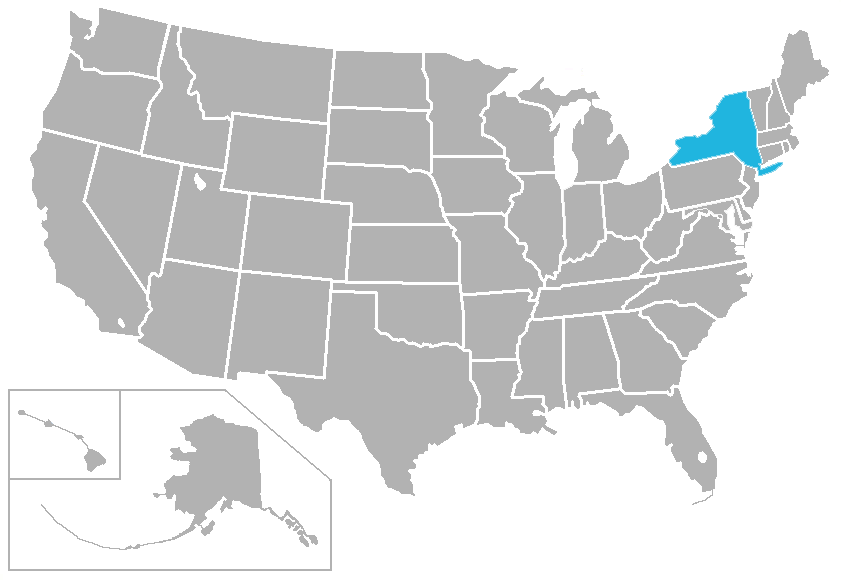

The Liberty League is an intercollegiate athletic conference which competes in the National Collegiate Athletic Association (NCAA) Division III. Member schools are all located in the state of New York.

== History ==
Map showing current full member institutions (click to enlarge)

It was founded in 1995 as the Upstate Collegiate Athletic Association. The conference was renamed during the summer of 2004 to the current name.

The league includes founding members Clarkson University, Hobart and William Smith Colleges, Rensselaer Polytechnic Institute, the University of Rochester, St. Lawrence University, Skidmore College, and Union College. Vassar College became a full member of the league during the 2000–01 academic year, Bard College and Rochester Institute of Technology joined for the 2011–12 academic year, and Ithaca College officially joined for the 2017–18 academic year. Founding member Hamilton College departed following the 2010–11 academic year in order to fully integrate its athletic programs within the New England Small College Athletic Conference (NESCAC).

Buffalo State University and Hilbert College are associate members in football only.

=== Accomplishments ===
Offensive linesman Ali Marpet of Hobart and William Smith Colleges, drafted in the 2nd round, 61st overall, of the 2015 NFL draft, is the highest-drafted pick in the history of Division III football. He was three-time All-Liberty League first team (2012, 2013, 2014), and 2014 Liberty League Co-Offensive Player of the Year—the first offensive lineman in league history to be so honored.

=== Chronological timeline ===
- 1995 – In 1995, the Liberty League was founded as the Upstate Collegiate Athletic Association (UCAA). Charter members included Clarkson University, Hamilton College, Hobart and William Smith Colleges, the University of Rochester, Rensselaer Polytechnic Institute (RPI), St. Lawrence University, Skidmore College and Union College, beginning the 1995–96 academic year.
- 2001 – Vassar College joined the UCAA in the 2000–01 academic year.
- 2004:
  - On July 1, 2004, the UCAA was rebranded as the Liberty League; beginning the 2004–05 academic year.
  - The United States Coast Guard Academy (Coast Guard), the United States Merchant Marine Academy (Merchant Marine) and Worcester Polytechnic Institute (WPI) joined the Liberty League as associate members for football in the 2004 fall season (2004–05 academic year).
- 2006 – U.S. Coast Guard left the Liberty League as an associate member for football after the 2005 fall season (2005–06 academic year).
- 2007 – Susquehanna University joined the Liberty League as an associate member for football in the 2007 fall season (2007–08 academic year).
- 2009 – U.S. Merchant Marine added men's golf to its Liberty League associate membership in the 2010 spring season (2009–10 academic year).
- 2010 – Susquehanna left the Liberty League as an associate member for football after the 2009 fall season (2009–10 academic year).
- 2011:
  - Charter member Hamilton left the Liberty League in order to fully integrate its athletic programs within the New England Small College Athletic Conference (NESCAC) after the 2010–11 academic year.
  - Bard College and Rochester Institute of Technology (RIT) joined the Liberty League in the 2011–12 academic year.
- 2012:
  - U.S. Merchant Marine left the Liberty League as an associate member for men's golf after dropping the sport after the 2012 spring season (2011–12 academic year).
  - Four institutions joined the Liberty League as associate members, all effective in the 2012–13 academic year:
    - Springfield College for football
    - New York University for both men's and women's golf
    - and Mount Holyoke College and Wellesley College for women's golf
- 2013 – St. John Fisher College joined the Liberty League as an associate member for men's and women's rowing in the 2013–14 academic year.
- 2017:
  - Springfield, U.S. Merchant Marine and Worcester Poly (WPI) left the Liberty League as associate members for football after the 2016 fall season (2016–17 academic year).
  - Ithaca College joined the Liberty League in the 2017–18 academic year.
- 2019 – Buffalo State College (now Buffalo State University) joined the Liberty League as an associate member for football in the 2019 fall season (2019–20 academic year).
- 2020 – Mount Holyoke left the Liberty League as an associate member for women's golf after dropping the sport after the 2020 spring season (2019–20 academic year).
- 2022:
  - St. John Fisher left the Liberty League as an associate member for men's rowing after the 2021–22 academic year.
  - Denison University joined the Liberty League as an associate member for men's and women's squash in the 2022–23 academic year.
- 2023 – Two institutions joined the Liberty League as associate members, both effective in the 2023–24 academic year:
  - Haverford College for men's and women's squash
  - and Mount Holyoke for women's squash
- 2024 – Mount Holyoke left the Liberty League as an associate member for women's squash after the 2023–24 academic year.
- 2025 – The Liberty League announced that it entered into a scheduling agreement for non-conference football games with the Empire 8 for the 2025 and 2026 seasons. As part of this agreement, Hilbert College joined the Liberty League from the Empire 8 as an associate member for football, beginning the 2025 fall season (2025–26 academic year), giving both leagues 8 football-playing members.

== Member schools ==
=== Current members ===
The Liberty League currently has 12 full members, all are private schools:

Institution	Location (Note: All cities were located in the State of New York.)	Founded	Affiliation	Enrollment	Nickname	Colors	Joined (Note: Represents the calendar year when fall sports competition begins.)	Football?
Bard College	Annandale-on-Hudson	1860	Episcopal	1,958	Raptors		2011	No
Clarkson University	Potsdam	1896	Nonsectarian	2,848	Golden Knights		1995	No
Hobart College (Note: Hobart (men) and William Smith (women) are together the Colleges of the Seneca and usually grouped together, but they participate separately in athletics.)	Geneva	1822	Episcopal	905	Statesmen		1995	Yes
Ithaca College	Ithaca	1892	Nonsectarian	6,769	Bombers		2017	Yes
Rensselaer Polytechnic Institute (RPI)	Troy	1824	Nonsectarian	5,431	Engineers		1995	Yes
University of Rochester (Note: Rochester holds dual conference membership with both the Liberty and the University Athletic Association (UAA).)	Rochester	1850	Nonsectarian	12,233	Yellowjackets		1995	Yes
Rochester Institute of Technology (RIT)	Henrietta	1829	Nonsectarian	18,000	Tigers		2011	No
St. Lawrence University	Canton	1856	Nonsectarian	2,327	Saints		1995	Yes
Skidmore College	Saratoga Springs	1903	Nonsectarian	2,734	Thoroughbreds		1995	No
Union College	Schenectady	1795	Nonsectarian	2,197	Garnet Chargers		1995	Yes
Vassar College	Poughkeepsie	1861	Nonsectarian	2,446	Brewers		2001	No
William Smith College	Geneva	1908	Episcopal	1,045	Herons		1995	No

=== Associate members ===
The Liberty League currently has seven associate members, all but one are private schools:

Institution	Location	Founded	Affiliation	Enrollment	Nickname	Joined (Note: Represents the calendar year when fall sports competition begins.)	Liberty sport	Primary conference
Buffalo State University	Buffalo, New York	1871	Public (Note: Part of the State University of New York System.)	8,339	Bengals	2019	Football	S.U. New York (SUNYAC)
Denison University	Granville, Ohio	1831	Nonsectarian	2,100	Big Red	2022^{m.sq.}	Men's squash	North Coast (NCAC)
Denison University	Granville, Ohio	1831	Nonsectarian	2,100	Big Red	2022^{w.sq.}	Women's squash	North Coast (NCAC)
Haverford College	Haverford, Pennsylvania	1833	Nonsectarian	1,268	Fords	2023^{m.sq.}	Men's squash	Centennial
Haverford College	Haverford, Pennsylvania	1833	Nonsectarian	1,268	Fords	2023^{w.sq.}	Women's squash	Centennial
Hilbert College	Hamburg, New York	1957	Catholic (Franciscan)	800	Hawks	2025	Football	Allegheny Mountain (AMCC)
New York University	New York City	1832	Nonsectarian	22,280	Violets	2012^{m.gf.}	Men's golf	University Athletic (UAA)
New York University	New York City	1832	Nonsectarian	22,280	Violets	2012^{w.gf.}	Women's golf	University Athletic (UAA)
St. John Fisher University	Rochester, New York	1948	Catholic (Basilians)	4,000	Cardinals	2013	Women's rowing	Empire 8 (E8)
Wellesley College	Wellesley, Massachusetts	1870	Nonsectarian	2,300	Blue	2012	Women's golf	New England (NEWMAC)

=== Former full members ===
The Liberty League had one former full member, which was also a private school:

Institution	Location (Note: All cities were located in the State of New York.)	Founded	Affiliation	Enrollment	Nickname	Joined (Note: Represents the calendar year when fall sports competition begins.)	Left (Note: Represents the calendar year when spring sports competition ends.)	Current conference
Hamilton College (Note: Hamilton left the Liberty League after the 2010–11 school year in order to fully align with the New England Small College Athletic Conference (NESCAC), of which it has been a charter member since 1971. The school previously held dual membership with both the Liberty and NESCAC conferences.)	Clinton	1793	Nonsectarian	1,864	Continentals	1995	2011	New England (NESCAC)

=== Former associate members ===
The Liberty League had seven former associate members, all but two were private schools:

Institution	Location	Founded	Affiliation	Enrollment	Nickname	Joined (Note: Represents the calendar year when fall sports competition begins.)	Left (Note: Represents the calendar year when spring sports competition ends.)	Liberty sport	Current primary conference
United States Coast Guard Academy (Coast Guard)	New London, Connecticut	1876	Federal	1,045	Bears	2004	2006	Football (Note: Coast Guard competed in the Liberty League as a football-only associate member in the 2004 and 2005 fall seasons after its previous conference, the Freedom Football Conference, disbanded (it competed in the New England Women's and Men's Athletic Conference (NEWMAC) in most other sports, where it remains). After two seasons it moved to the New England Football Conference (since rebranded as Commonwealth Coast Football [CCF], now being part of the Conference of New England [CNE]), where it remained through the 2016 fall season. Coast Guard's football program soon joined its other sports in the NEWMAC in fall 2017, when that league began sponsoring football.)	New England (NEWMAC)
United States Merchant Marine Academy (Merchant Marine)	Kings Point, New York	1942	Federal	910	Mariners	2004^{fb.}	2017^{fb.}	Football (Note: After competing in the Liberty League as an associate member, Merchant Marine's football team joined the New England Women's and Men's Athletic Conference (NEWMAC) as of the 2017 fall season (2017–18 school year).)	Skyline
United States Merchant Marine Academy (Merchant Marine)	Kings Point, New York	1942	Federal	910	Mariners	2009^{m.gf.}	2012^{m.gf.}	Men's golf (Note: Merchant Marine discontinued men's golf after the 2012 spring season (2011–12 school year).)	Skyline
Mount Holyoke College	South Hadley, Massachusetts	1837	Nonsectarian	2,100	Lyons	2012^{w.gf.}	2020^{w.gf.}	Women's golf (Note: Mount Holyoke discontinued women's golf after the 2020 spring season (2019–20 school year).)	New England (NEWMAC)
Mount Holyoke College	South Hadley, Massachusetts	1837	Nonsectarian	2,100	Lyons	2023^{w.sq.}	2024^{w.sq.}	Women's squash	New England (NEWMAC)
St. John Fisher University	Rochester, New York	1948	Catholic (Basilians)	4,000	Cardinals	2013	2022	Men's rowing	Empire 8 (E8)
Springfield College	Springfield, Massachusetts	1885	Nonsectarian	5,062	Pride	2012	2017	Football	New England (NEWMAC)
Susquehanna University	Selinsgrove, Pennsylvania	1858	Lutheran (ELCA)	2,200	River Hawks	2007	2011	Football (Note: Susquehanna competed in the Liberty League as a football-only associate member for the 2007, 2008 and 2009 fall seasons after leaving its previous football conference, the Middle Atlantic Conferences (it then competed in the Landmark Conference in most other sports, where it remains to this day). After three seasons it moved to the Centennial Conference.)	Landmark
Worcester Polytechnic Institute (WPI)	Worcester, Massachusetts	1865	Nonsectarian	5,071	Engineers	2004	2017	Football	New England (NEWMAC)

Liberty League other members
Locations of Liberty League other members, 2021–2022 Current associate Former full Former associate

=== Membership timeline ===
Full member (all sports) Full member (non-football) Associate member (football) Associate member (sport)

== Sports ==
The Liberty League sponsors intercollegiate athletic competition in men's baseball, men's and women's basketball, men's and women's crew, men's and women's cross country, women's field hockey, men's football, men's golf, men's and women's lacrosse, men's and women's soccer, women's softball, men's and women's squash, men's and women's swimming and diving, men's and women's tennis, men's and women's track and field, and women's volleyball.

Conference sports
Sport	Men's	Women's
Baseball	✓	
Basketball	✓	✓
Cross Country	✓	✓
Field Hockey		✓
Football	✓	
Golf	✓	✓
Lacrosse	✓	✓
Rowing	✓	✓
Soccer	✓	✓
Softball		✓
Squash	✓	✓
Swimming & Diving	✓	✓
Tennis	✓	✓
Track & Field (Indoor)	✓	✓
Track & Field (Outdoor)	✓	✓
Volleyball		✓

=== Men's sponsored sports by school ===
School	Baseball	Basketball	Cross Country	Football	Golf	Lacrosse	Rowing (Note: Not an NCAA sport.)	Soccer	Squash	Swimming & Diving	Tennis	Track & Field (Indoor)	Track & Field (Outdoor)	Total Liberty League Sports
Bard	✓	✓	✓	✗	✗	✗	✗	✓	✓	✓ (Note: Swimming only)	✓	✓	✓	9
Clarkson	✓	✓	✓	✗	✓	✓	✗	✓	✗	✓	✗	✗	✗	7
Hobart	✓	✓	✓	✓	✓	A10	✓	✓	✓	✓	✓	✗	✗	10
Ithaca	✓	✓	✓	✓	✗	✓	✓	✓	✗	✓	✓	✓	✓	11
RIT	✓	✓	✓	✗	✗	✓	✓	✓	✗	✓	✓	✓	✓	10
Rochester	✓	UAA	UAA	✓	✓	✗	✗	UAA	✓	UAA	UAA	✓	✓	6
RPI	✓	✓	✓	✓	✓	✓	✗	✓	✗	✓	✓	✓	✓	11
Skidmore	✓	✓	✗	✗	✓	✓	✓	✓	✗	✓	✓	✗	✗	8
St. Lawrence	✓	✓	✓	✓	✓	✓	✓	✓	✓	✓	✓	✓	✓	13
Union	✓	✓	✓	✓	✗	✓	✗	✓	✗	✓	✓	✓	✓	10
Vassar	✓	✓	✓	✗	✗	✓	✓	✓	✓	✓	✓	✓	✓	11
Totals	11	10	9	6+2 (Note: Associate members Buffalo State and Hilbert)	6+1 (Note: Associate member NYU)	8	6+1 (Note: Associate member St. John Fisher)	10	5+2 (Note: Associate members Denison and Haverford)	10	9	8	8	106+5

==== Men's varsity sports not sponsored by the Liberty League ====
School	Alpine Skiing (Note: The Liberty League organizes separate men's and women's championships in Alpine and Nordic skiing, but the NCAA holds a single coeducational skiing championship that includes events in both disciplines. With the NCAA championship open to members of all three divisions, this is a de facto Division I sport.)	Crew (Note: The Liberty League treats "crew" and "rowing" as separate sports. The NCAA recognizes neither as a men's sport.)	Fencing (Note: De facto Division I sport; the NCAA championship is open to members of all three divisions.)	Ice Hockey	Nordic Skiing	Riding (Note: Not governed by the NCAA, which calls the women's version of this sport "equestrian".)	Rugby (Note: Not governed by the NCAA.)	Sailing	Volleyball	Wrestling
Bard	No	No	No	No	No	No	No	No	CNE	No
Clarkson	Independent	No	No	ECAC Hockey (Note: Division I conference.)	Independent	No	No	No	No	No
Hobart	Independent	No	No	SUNYAC	No	No	No	Independent	AMCC	No
Ithaca	No	No	No	No	No	No	No	No	No	SUNYAC
RIT	No	No	No	AHA	No	No	No	No	No	SUNYAC
RPI	No	No	No	ECAC Hockey	No	No	No	No	No	No
Skidmore	No	No	No	SUNYAC	No	IHSA	No	No	No	No
St. Lawrence	Independent	No	No	ECAC Hockey	Independent	IHSA	No	No	No	No
Union	No	Independent	No	ECAC Hockey	No	No	No	No	No	No
Vassar	No	No	NFC	No	No	No	Independent	No	NEWMAC	No

=== Women's sponsored sports by school ===
School	Basketball	Cross Country	Field Hockey	Golf	Lacrosse	Rowing	Soccer	Softball	Squash (Note: Not organized by the NCAA.)	Swimming & Diving	Tennis	Track & Field (Indoor)	Track & Field (Outdoor)	Volleyball	Total Liberty League Sports
Bard	✓	✓	✗	✗	✓	✗	✓	✗	✓	✓ (Note: Swimming only)	✓	✓	✓	✓	10
Clarkson	✓	✓	✗	✗	✓	✗	✓	✓	✗	✓	✗	✗	✗	✓	7
Ithaca	✓	✓	✓	✓	✓	✓	✓	✓	✗	✓	✓	✓	✓	✓	13
RIT	✓	✓	✗	✗	✓	✓	✓	✓	✗	✓	✓	✓	✓	✓	11
Rochester	UAA	UAA	✓	✗	✓	✓	UAA	✓	✗	UAA	UAA	✓	✓	UAA	6
RPI	✓	✓	✓	✗	✓	✗	✓	✓	✗	✓	✓	✓	✓	✗	10
Skidmore	✓	✗	✓	✗	✓	✓	✓	✓	✗	✓	✓	✗	✗	✓	9
St. Lawrence	✓	✓	✓	✓	✓	✓	✓	✓	✓	✓	✓	✓	✓	✓	14
Union	✓	✓	✓	✓	✓	✗	✓	✓	✗	✓	✓	✓	✓	✓	12
Vassar	✓	✓	✓	✓	✓	✓	✓	✗	✓	✓	✓	✓	✓	✓	13
William Smith	✓	✓	✓	✓	✓	✓	✓	✗	✓	✓	✓	✗	✗	✓	11
Totals	10	9	8	5+2 (Note: Associate members NYU and Wellesley)	11	7+1 (Note: Associate member St. John Fisher)	10	8	4+2 (Note: Associate members Denison and Haverford)	10	9	8	8	9	116+5

==== Women's varsity sports not sponsored by the Liberty League ====
School	Alpine Skiing (Note: The Liberty League organizes separate men's and women's championships in Alpine and Nordic skiing, but the NCAA holds a single coeducational skiing championship that includes events in both disciplines. With the NCAA championship open to members of all three divisions, this is a de facto Division I sport.)	Bowling (Note: De facto Division I sport. Through the 2026–27 season, the NCAA holds a single national championship event open to members of all three NCAA divisions. The sport's status with respect to Division III will not be affected by the establishment of a separate Division II championship in 2027–28.)	Crew (Note: The Liberty League treats "crew" and "sculling" as separate from the NCAA-recognized sport of women's rowing. The current NCAA championship is held only for women's heavyweight rowing (no weight limit), with each participating program fielding three boats—two eight-woman boats and one four-woman boat, in all cases with a coxswain. "Crew" is used in women's rowing for non-NCAA team disciplines. "Sculling" involves boats operated by a single rower.)	Fencing (Note: De facto Division I sport; the NCAA championship is open to members of all NCAA divisions.)	Gymnastics	Ice Hockey	Nordic Skiing	Riding (Note: Part of the NCAA Emerging Sports for Women program under the name of "equestrian".)	Rugby (Note: Part of the NCAA Emerging Sports for Women program.)	Sailing (Note: Not an NCAA sport.)	Sculling	Wrestling (Note: De facto Division I sport through the 2026–27 season, after which a separate Division III championship will be established.)
Clarkson	Independent	No	No	No	No	ECAC Hockey (Note: Division I conference.)	Independent	No	No	No	No	No
Ithaca	No	No	No	No	NCGA	No	No	No	No	No	Independent	Independent
RIT	No	No	No	No	No	AHA	No	No	No	No	No	No
RPI	No	No	No	No	No	ECAC Hockey	No	No	No	No	No	No
Skidmore	No	No	No	No	No	No	No	IHSA	No	No	No	No
St. Lawrence	Independent	No	No	No	No	ECAC Hockey	Independent	IHSA	No	No	No	No
Union	No	No	Independent	No	No	ECAC Hockey	No	No	No	No	No	No
Vassar	No	No	No	NFC	No	No	No	No	Independent	No	No	No
William Smith	Independent	Independent	No	No	No	SUNYAC	No	No	No	Independent	No	No

== See also ==
- Patriot League
