= David B. Sachar =

American gastroenterologist

David B. Sachar is an American gastroenterologist.

Sachar received his undergraduate degree at Harvard College and earned his medical degree from Harvard Medical School. He teaches at Mount Sinai School of Medicine, where he was the first Dr. Burrill B. Crohn Professor of Medicine from 1992 to 1999.

Sachar was honored with a 2019 Golden Goose Award for his contributions to Oral Rehydration Therapy for the treatment of cholera.
