= Chicago Maroons football =

Football team representing the University of Chicago

- First season: 1892; 134 years ago (Note: Chicago did not fielded a football team from 1940 to 1962, and they had a club team from 1963 to 1968. The varsity football team was relaunched in 1969; 57 years ago.)
- Athletic director: Angie Torain
- Head coach: Craig Knoche; 2nd season, 16–5 (.762)
- Location: Chicago, Illinois
- Stadium: New Stagg Field (capacity: 1,650)
- Conference: MWC
- Colors: Maroon and white
- All-time record: 416–368–34 (.529)
- Bowl record: 1–0 (1.000)

National championships
- Claimed: 2 (1905, 1913)

Conference championships
- 12 (1899, 1905, 1907, 1908, 1913, 1922, 1924, 1998, 2000, 2005, 2010, 2014)
- Heisman winners: Jay Berwanger (1935)
- Consensus All-Americans: 12

Uniforms
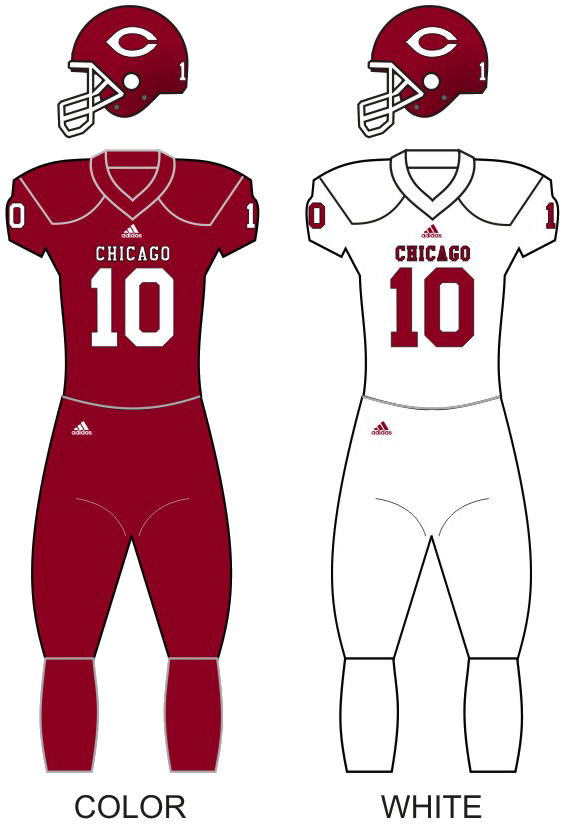
- Fight song: Wave the Flag
- Mascot: Phil the Phoenix
- Website: Athletics.UChicago.edu

The Chicago Maroons football team represents the University of Chicago in college football. The Maroons, which play in NCAA Division III, have been a football-only member of the Midwest Conference since 2017. The University of Chicago was a founding member of the Big Ten Conference and the Maroons were coached by Amos Alonzo Stagg for 41 seasons. In 1935, halfback Jay Berwanger became the first recipient of the Downtown Athletic Club Trophy, later known as the Heisman Trophy. In the late 1930s, university president Robert Maynard Hutchins decided that big-time college football and the university's commitment to academics were not compatible. The university abolished its football program in 1939 and withdrew from the Big Ten in 1946. Football returned to the University of Chicago in 1963 in the form of a club team, which was upgraded to varsity status in 1969. The Maroons began competing in Division III in 1973.

== History ==
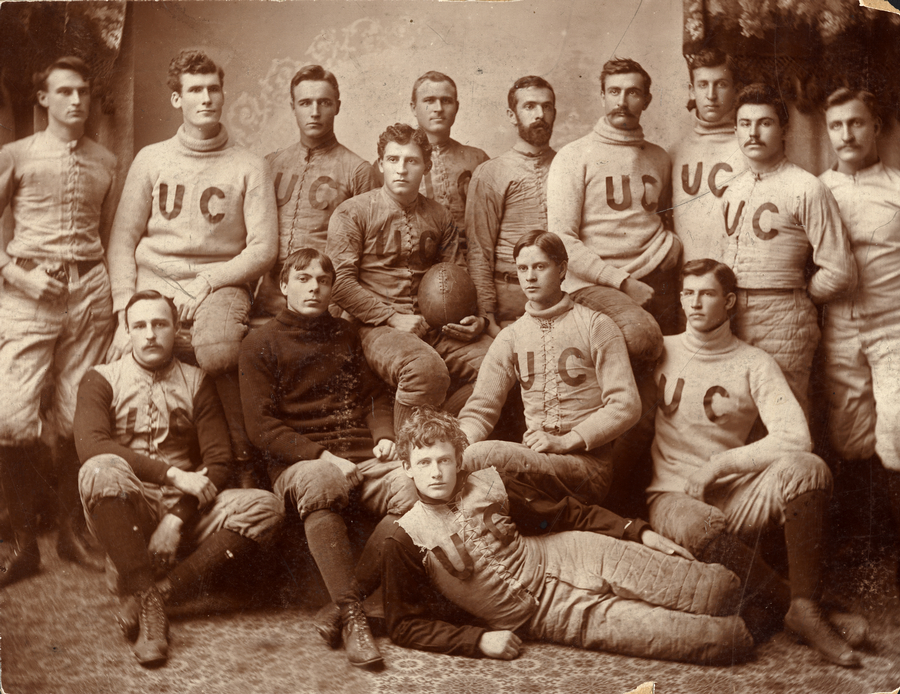
The first team fielded by the University of Chicago in 1892

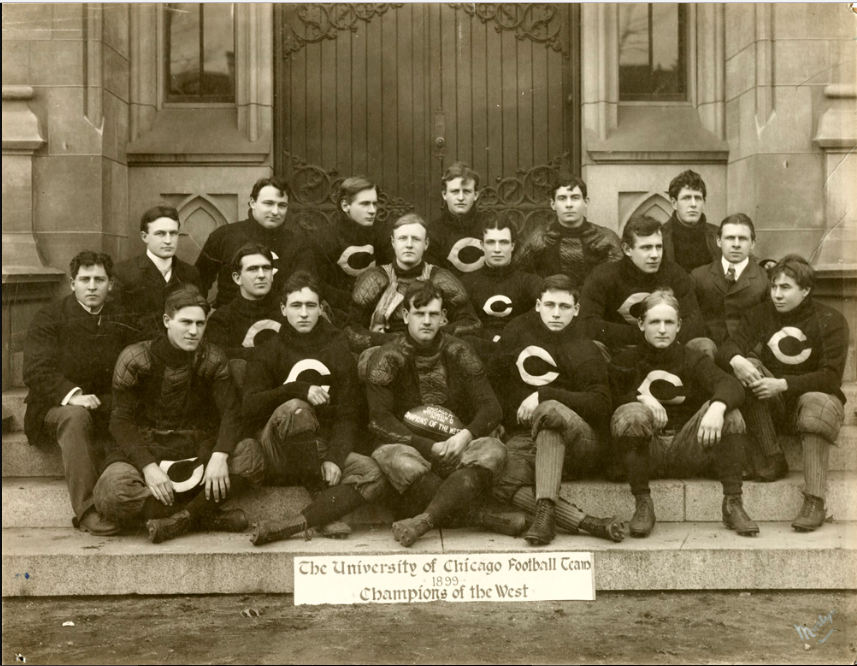
The team that won its first Big Ten Conference championship in 1899

The program began play in 1892, with coach Amos Alonzo Stagg at the helm, where he would serve for until 1933. The team's name came about when Stagg decided the team needed to change in its color from goldenrod, with Stagg pointing out how the color soiled easily. On May 5, 1894, students and faculty met to determine the official color and nickname, with the result being the Maroons. The Maroons spent their first four seasons as an independent, with 1894 being a highlight year in which they went 10–7–1. They joined the Big Ten Conference in 1896. In 1899, they won their first Big Ten title, going 12–0–2 in regular play and 4–0 in conference play. Stagg formed a squad that would be fairly consistent for a quarter of a century, with the Maroons winning seven conference titles from 1899 to 1924, while managing to have four seasons in which they did not lose a game.

The Chicago football team has used the wishbone-C logo since at least 1898.

Stagg retired from Chicago after the 1932 season, in which the team went 3–4–1 (1–4), and then coached at the University of the Pacific. Clark Shaughnessy took over as the Maroons football coach in 1933. In his seven seasons he led them to two .500 records, but no finish above 6th in the conference. In 1936, they beat Wisconsin 7–6. As it turned out, this was their last conference win as a Big Ten member. The team disbanded in 1939.

Chicago fielded a football team again for the 1969 season. The team struggled for a few years, not getting to .500 until 1976, with a 4–4 record, and not getting above .500 until 1985. The first few decades were marked by losing, with four winless seasons occurring from 1973 to 1991. In 1994, Dick Maloney was hired as coach of the team. His 1995 team went 8–2, the Maroons' most wins in a season since coming back as a team. In 1998, the Maroons won the UAA conference title, winning all four of its conference games. The Maroons won three more conference titles under Maloney, who retired in 2012. Chris Wilkerson was hired as coach in 2013. In his second season, he led them to a UAA title.

In November 2026, after finishing their regular season 8-2 and tied for second in the Midwest Conference, Chicago accepted a bid to the Lakefront Bowl, the first post-season appearance by the Maroons in program history.

== Conference affiliations ==
- Independent (1892–1895)
- Big Ten Conference (1896–1939)
- No team (1940–1962)
- Club team (1963–1968)
- Independent (1969–1972)
- NCAA Division III independent (1973–1975)
- Midwest Collegiate Athletic Conference (1976–1987)
- University Athletic Association (1988–2016)
- Southern Athletic Association (2015–2016)
- Midwest Conference (2017–present)

== Championships ==
=== National championships ===
Chicago lays claim to two national championships. Although they do not compete in NCAA Division I FBS, they maintain claims to titles won at the highest level at the time.

Season	Coach	Selector	Record
1905	Amos Alonzo Stagg	Billingsley, Helms, Houlgate, NCF	11–0
1913	Amos Alonzo Stagg	Billingsley, Parke Davis	7–0

=== Conference championships ===
Chicago has won 12 conference championships, seven in the Big Ten Conference and five in the University Athletic Association

Season	Conference	Coach	Overall Record	Conference Record
1899	Big Ten Conference	Amos Alonzo Stagg	12–0–2	4–0
1905	Big Ten Conference	Amos Alonzo Stagg	11–0	7–0
1907	Big Ten Conference	Amos Alonzo Stagg	4–1	4–0
1908	Big Ten Conference	Amos Alonzo Stagg	5–0–1	5–0
1913	Big Ten Conference	Amos Alonzo Stagg	7–0	7–0
1922†	Big Ten Conference	Amos Alonzo Stagg	5–1–1	4–0–1
1924	Big Ten Conference	Amos Alonzo Stagg	4–1–3	3–0–3
1998	University Athletic Association	Dick Maloney	7–2	4–0
2000	University Athletic Association	Dick Maloney	7–2	4–0
2005	University Athletic Association	Dick Maloney	5–4	3–0
2010	University Athletic Association	Dick Maloney	8–2	3–0
2014	University Athletic Association	Chris Wilkerson	8–1	3–0

† Co-champions

== All-time record against current Big Ten members ==
School	Wins	Losses	Ties	%
Illinois	19	22	3	.466
Indiana	20	4	1	.789
Iowa	9	3	2	.714
Maryland*	1	0	0	1.000
Michigan	7	19	0	.269
Michigan State*	1	0	0	1.000
Minnesota	5	12	1	.306
Nebraska*	1	1	0	.500
Northwestern	26	8	3	.743
Ohio State	2	10	2	.214
Oregon*	0	0	0	N/A
Penn State*	0	0	0	N/A
Purdue	27	14	1	.655
Rutgers*	0	0	0	N/A
Washington*	1	0	0	1.000
Wisconsin	16	19	5	.463
UCLA*	0	0	0	N/A
USC*	0	0	0	N/A

Note: Michigan State, Oregon, Penn State, Nebraska, Maryland, Rutgers, Washington, UCLA, and USC were not members of the Big Ten when Chicago was a member.

== Notable personnel ==
=== College Football Hall of Fame ===
Name	Position	Tenure	Inducted	Notes
Jay Berwanger	Halfback	1933–1935	1954	First recipient of the Heisman Trophy
Hugo Bezdek	Fullback	1905	1954	Inducted for his career as a coach at Oregon, Arkansas, and Penn State
Fritz Crisler	End	1919–1921	1954	Inducted for his career as a coach at Minnesota, Princeton, and Michigan
Paul Des Jardien	Center	1912–1914	1955	All-American in 1913 and 1914
Walter Eckersall	Quarterback	1903–1906	1951	Leader of the 1905 national championship team
Clarence Herschberger	Fullback	1895–1898	1970	First western player selected as a first-team All-American
Tiny Maxwell	Guard	1902, 1904–1905	1974	All-American for 1905 national championship team
Clark Shaughnessy	Coach	1933–1939	1968	College football coach for 50 years
Amos Alonzo Stagg	Coach	1892–1932	1951	"The Grand Old Man of the Midway"
Walter Steffen	Quarterback	1906–1908	1969	Scored 156 points for teams that went 13–2–1; First-team All-American, 1908
Andy "Polyphemus" Wyant	Guard, Center	1892–1894	1962	Played 8 varsity seasons of college football for Bucknell and Chicago

=== Others ===
- Walter S. Kennedy, quarterback for Stagg's 1898–1899 teams
- Wally Marks, fullback and halfback, 1924–1926; leader of Chicago's last Big Ten championship team
- Nelson Norgren, played football under Stagg, coached Chicago basketball team, 1921–1942, 1944–1957
- Laurens Shull, All-American, killed in action during World War I
- Frederick A. Speik, end, All-American, 1904
- Herman Stegeman, played for 1913 national championship; later coached football, baseball, basketball and track at Georgia
- John Webster Thomas, fullback, All-American 1922, played for Stagg 1921–1923
- Mysterious Walker, played for Stagg, 1904–1906; coached college teams, 1907–1940
- Graham Kernwein, played for Stagg, 1923–1925; later played in the NFL

== See also ==
- List of NCAA Division III football programs
- Chicago Maroons
