= University Athletic Association =

Athletic conference of US private universities

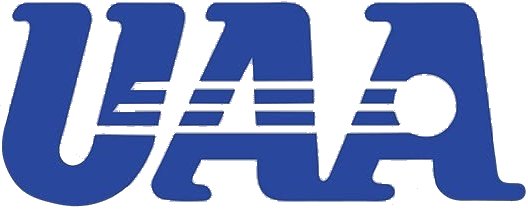
- Association: NCAA
- Founded: 1986
- Commissioner: Sarah Otey (since 2024)
- Sports fielded: 20; men's: 10; women's: 10
- Division: Division III
- No. of teams: 8
- Headquarters: Rochester, New York
- Region: Eastern United States; Midwest; Southern United States
- Website: uaasports.info

Locations
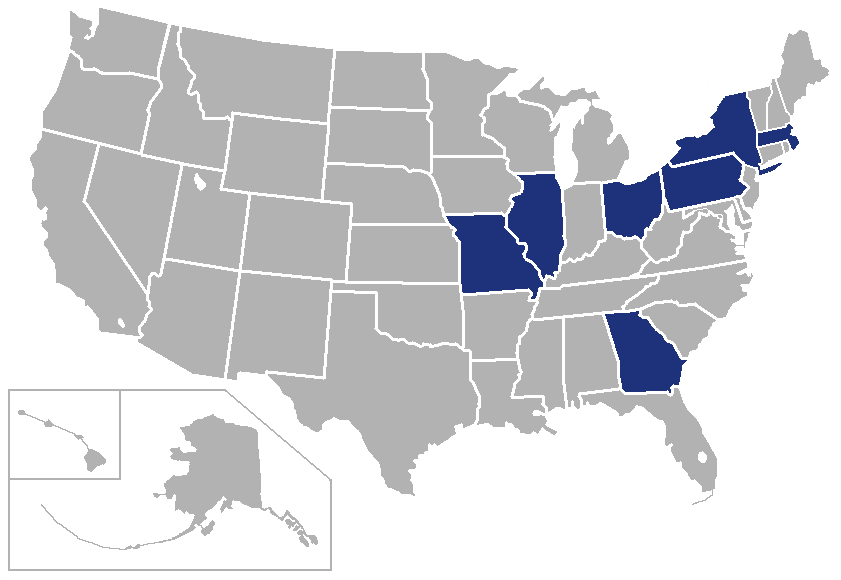

The University Athletic Association (UAA) is an intercollegiate athletic conference that competes in the National Collegiate Athletic Association (NCAA) Division III. Member schools are universities located in Georgia, Illinois, Massachusetts, Missouri, New York, Ohio, and Pennsylvania. The eight members are Brandeis University, Carnegie Mellon University, Case Western Reserve University, Emory University, New York University, The University of Chicago, University of Rochester, and Washington University in St. Louis.

== Academics ==
All UAA member schools are private research universities that tend to rank well in U.S. News & World Report's Best Colleges Rankings. The UAA was the only NCAA conference to have all of its member institutions affiliated with the Association of American Universities, a collection of 65 Ph.D.-granting research institutions, with 63 in the United States and two in Canada, from 2011, when Nebraska joined the previously all-AAU Big Ten, until 2019 when Dartmouth became the last Ivy League institution to join the AAU.

== History ==
University Athletic Association
Locations of UAA members

=== Chronological timeline ===
- 1986 – In 1986, the University Athletic Association (UAA) was founded. Charter members included Carnegie Mellon University, Case Western Reserve University, Emory University, Johns Hopkins University, New York University, The University of Chicago, the University of Rochester, and Washington University in St. Louis, beginning the 1986–87 academic year.
- 1987 – Brandeis University joined the UAA in the 1987–88 academic year.
- 2001 – Johns Hopkins left the UAA to fully align all its sports into the Centennial Conference after the 2000–01 academic year.
- 2018 – The UAA dropped football as a sponsored sport, due to its members joining other athletic conferences for that sport as affiliates or associates after the 2017 fall season (2017–18 academic year).

== Member schools ==
=== Current members ===
The UAA currently has eight full members, all are private schools:

Institution	Location	Founded	Undergraduate enrollment	Total enrollment	Nickname	School colors	USNWR Ranking	Endowment (billions)	Joined (Note: Represents the calendar year when fall sports competition begins.) (Note: All of the universities listed above are founding members except Brandeis, which joined shortly before official competition began in October 1987. Johns Hopkins University was a founding member, but no longer participates in the UAA.)	Fall 2020 acceptance rate	Alumni median starting salary
Brandeis University (Note: Brandeis had dual athletic conference membership with the New England Women's and Men's Athletic Conference from 1987–88 to 1994–95, then the Judges' women's sports left the NEWMAC in order to fully align with the UAA, along with its men's sports.)	Waltham, Massachusetts	1948	3,608	5,788	Judges		59	$1.07	1987	31%	$50,600
Carnegie Mellon University	Pittsburgh, Pennsylvania	1900	6,673	10,875	Tartans		14	$2.67	1986	22%	$110,000
Case Western Reserve University (Note: Case Western Reserve had dual athletic conference membership with the North Coast Athletic Conference from 1986–87 to 1998–99, then the Spartans left the NCAC in order to fully align with the UAA.)	Cleveland, Ohio	1826	6,534	12,398	Spartans		44	$2.52	1986	27%	$61,300
Emory University	Atlanta, Georgia	1836	6,861	12,755	Eagles		23	$7.94	1986	15%	$54,600
New York University	Manhattan, New York	1831	26,135	42,189	Violets		31	$5.8	1986	15%	$54,400
University of Chicago	Chicago, Illinois	1890	5,941	14,788	Maroons		9	$11.6	1986	6%	$54,400
University of Rochester (Note: Rochester has dual athletic conference membership with the Liberty League since the 1995–96 school year.)	Rochester, New York	1850	6,386	9,735	Yellowjackets		49	$3.71	1986	29%	$54,800
Washington University in St. Louis	St. Louis, Missouri	1853	7,540	13,527	Bears		16	$15.3	1986	14%	$57,300

=== Former member ===
The UAA had one former full member, which was also a private school:

Institution	Location	Founded	Affiliation	Enrollment	Nickname	Joined (Note: Represents the calendar year when fall sports competition begins.)	Left (Note: Represents the calendar year when spring sports competition ends.)	School colors	Current conference
Johns Hopkins University (Note: Johns Hopkins had dual athletic conference membership with the Middle Atlantic Conferences from 1986–87 to 1991–92, and later with the Centennial Conference from 1992–93 to 2000–01, then the Blue Jays left the UAA in order to fully align with the Centennial.)	Baltimore, Maryland	1876	Nonsectarian	19,758	Blue Jays	1986	2001		Centennial

=== Membership timeline ===
Full member (all sports) Full member (non-football) Associate member (football) Associate member (sport)

== Conference facilities ==
School	Football stadium	Football capacity	Basketball arena	Basketball capacity	Baseball stadium	Baseball capacity	Soccer stadium	Soccer capacity
Brandeis	Non-Football School (Note: Brandeis discontinued its football program in May 1960. President Abram Sachar pointed to the cost of the team as one reason for the decision.)	N/A	Auerbach Arena	2,500	Stein Diamond	500	Gordon Field	1,000
Carnegie Mellon	Gesling Stadium (Note: Carnegie Mellon currently plays football in the Centennial Conference.)	3,900	Wiegand Gymnasium	1,000	Non-Baseball School	N/A	Gesling Stadium	3,900
Case Western Reserve	DiSanto Field (Note: Case Western currently plays football in the Presidents' Athletic Conference.)	2,500	Horsburgh Gym	1,200	Nobby's Ballpark	500	DiSanto Field	2,500
Chicago	Stagg Field (Note: Chicago currently plays football in the Midwest Conference.)	1,650	Gerald Ratner Athletics Center	1,900	J. Kyle Anderson Field		Stagg Field	1,650
Emory	Non-Football School (Note: Emory has never had an intercollegiate football team.)	N/A	Woodruff P.E. Center	2,000	Chappell Park (baseball); George F. Cooper, Jr. Field (softball)		Woodruff P.E. Center	
NYU	Non-Football School (Note: NYU discontinued its football program in 1952.)	N/A	John A. Paulson Center	1,900	SIUH Community Park	7,500	Gaelic Park	2,000
Rochester	Fauver Stadium (Note: Rochester competes in the Liberty League in baseball, football, and numerous other sports.)	5,000	Louis Alexander Palestra	1,889	Towers Field		Fauver Stadium	5,000
WashU	Francis Field (Note: WashU currently plays football in the North Coast Athletic Conference.)	3,300	Field House	3,000	Kelly Field		Francis Field	3,300

== Sports ==
The UAA sanctions competition in the following sports:

Conference sports
Sport	Men's	Women's
Baseball	✓	
Basketball	✓	✓
Cross country	✓	✓
Golf	✓	✓
Soccer	✓	✓
Softball		✓
Swimming & Diving	✓	✓
Tennis	✓	✓
Track & Field (Indoor)	✓	✓
Track & Field (Outdoor)	✓	✓
Wrestling	✓	
Volleyball		✓

=== Men's sponsored sports by school ===
School	Baseball	Basketball	Cross Country	Golf	Soccer	Swimming & Diving	Tennis	Track & Field (Indoor)	Track & Field (Outdoor)	Wrestling	Total UAA Sports
Brandeis	✓	✓	✓	✗	✓	✓	✓	✓	✓	✗	8
Carnegie Mellon	✗	✓	✓	✓	✓	✓	✓	✓	✓	✗	8
Case Western Reserve	✓	✓	✓	✗	✓	✓	✓	✓	✓	✓	9
Chicago	✓	✓	✓	✗	✓	✓	✓	✓	✓	✓	9
Emory	✓	✓	✓	✓	✓	✓	✓	✓	✓	✗	9
NYU	✓	✓	✓	✓	✓	✓	✓	✓	✓	✓	10
Rochester	LL	✓	✓	LL	✓	✓	✓	LL	LL	✗	5
WashU	✓	✓	✓	✗	✓	✓	✓	✓	✓	✗	8
Totals	6	8	8	3	8	8	8	7	7	3	66

==== Men's varsity sports not sponsored by the UAA ====
School	Fencing	Football	Squash	Volleyball
Brandeis	NFC			
Carnegie Mellon		CC		
Case Western Reserve		PAC		
Chicago		MWC		
NYU	IND			NEWMAC
Rochester		LL	LL	
WashU		NCAC		

=== Women's sponsored sports by school ===
School	Basketball	Cross Country	Golf	Soccer	Softball	Swimming & Diving	Tennis	Track & Field (Indoor)	Track & Field (Outdoor)	Volleyball	Total UAA Sports
Brandeis	✓	✓	✗	✓	✓	✓	✓	✓	✓	✓	9
Carnegie Mellon	✓	✓	✓	✓	✓	✓	✓	✓	✓	✓	10
Case Western Reserve	✓	✓	✗	✓	✓	✓	✓	✓	✓	✓	9
Chicago	✓	✓	✗	✓	✓	✓	✓	✓	✓	✓	9
Emory	✓	✓	✓	✓	✓	✓	✓	✓	✓	✓	10
NYU	✓	✓	✓	✓	✓	✓	✓	✓	✓	✓	10
Rochester	✓	✓	✗	✓	LL	✓	✓	LL	LL	✓	6
WashU	✓	✓	✓	✓	✓	✓	✓	✓	✓	✓	10
Totals	8	8	4	8	7	8	8	7	7	8	73

==== Women's varsity sports not sponsored by the UAA ====
School	Fencing	Field Hockey	Lacrosse	Rowing
Brandeis	NFC		2026-27	
Chicago			IND	
NYU	IND			
Rochester		LL	LL	LL
