= Midwest Conference =

NCAA Division III athletic conference

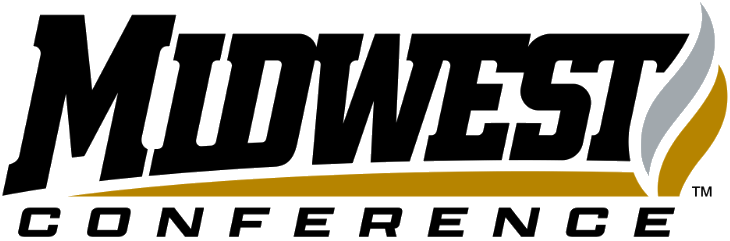
- Formerly: Midwest Collegiate Athletic Conference (1921–1994); Midwest Athletic Conference for Women (1977–1994)
- Association: NCAA
- Founded: 1921; 105 years ago
- Commissioner: Heather Benning (since 2014)
- Sports fielded: 20; men's: 10; women's: 10
- Division: Division III
- No. of teams: 10
- Headquarters: Grinnell, Iowa
- Region: Upper Midwest
- Website: midwestconference.org

Locations
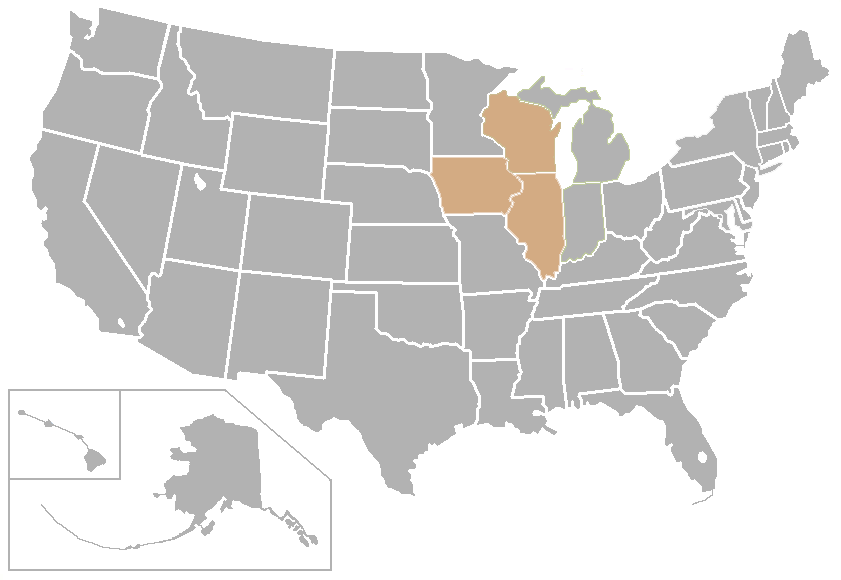

The Midwest Conference (MWC) is an intercollegiate athletic conference affiliated with the NCAA's Division III. Member institutions are located in the Midwestern United States in the states of Illinois, Iowa, and Wisconsin. The Midwest Conference was created in 1994 with the merger of the Midwest Collegiate Athletic Conference, which had been sponsoring men's sports since 1921, and the Midwest Athletic Conference for Women, which was formed in 1977.

== History ==
Midwest Conference
Location of Midwest members: current, affiliate

The organization of the Midwest Collegiate Athletic Conference (MCAC) was conceived at a meeting at Coe College on May 12, 1921. Charter members were Beloit College, Carleton College, Coe College, Cornell College, Knox College (Illinois) and Lawrence University. Hamline University and Millikin University joined the league in December 1921, but both of them later withdrew: Hamline after the 1929–30 academic year, and Millikin after the 1924–25 academic year.

Ripon College joined the conference in 1923, followed by Monmouth College in 1924, Grinnell College in 1940 and Lake Forest College in 1974. Illinois College and St. Norbert College joined in 1982 and Carroll University followed in 1992. Carleton withdrew following the 1982–83 academic year. St. Olaf College also competed in the conference from 1952 to 1974, as did the University of Chicago from 1976 to 1987. Coe and Cornell withdrew following the 1996–97 academic year with Cornell rejoining the league starting in the 2012–13 year. Macalester College joined as a football-only member starting in 2014. The University of Chicago returned as a football-only member in 2017, and added baseball to its conference membership in the 2019 season (2018–19 school year).

The MWC split into North and South divisions for football, men's and women's tennis, baseball, and softball from 2012 through 2016. Divisional play ended with the departure of Carroll after the 2015–16 school year, and resumed for football only with the addition of the University of Chicago as an affiliate member for the 2017–18 season. St. Norbert left in 2021 for the Northern Athletics Collegiate Conference.

On March 11, 2025, the Milwaukee School of Engineering (MSoE) announced that it would join the MWC as an affiliate member for men's and women's swimming & diving, beginning the 2025–26 winter season.

=== Chronological timeline ===
- 1921 – The Midwest Conference (MWC) was founded as the Midwest Collegiate Athletic Conference (MCAC). Charter members included Beloit College, Carleton College, Coe College, Cornell College, Knox College and Lawrence College (now Lawrence University), beginning the 1921–22 academic year.
- 1922 – Hamline University and Millikin College (now Millikin University) joined the MCAC in the 1922–23 academic year.
- 1923 – Ripon College joined the MCAC in the 1923–24 academic year.
- 1924 – Monmouth College joined the MCAC in the 1924–25 academic year.
- 1925 – Millikin left the MCAC after the 1924–25 academic year.
- 1930 – Hamline left the MCAC to fully align with the Minnesota Intercollegiate Athletic Conference (MIAC) after the 1929–30 academic year.
- 1940 – Grinnell College joined the MCAC in the 1940–41 academic year.
- 1941 – Carleton left the MCAC after the 1940–41 academic year; as the school withdrew from the conference in June 1941.
- 1945 – Carleton rejoined the MCAC during the 1946 spring season of the 1945–46 academic year; specifically for track and field.
- 1951 – Beloit College was expelled from the conference after from the faculty of the other members schools. The stated reason was that Beloit had athletic policies that ran "contrary to the spirit and principles of the conference" including the scheduling of large schools and participation in the National Invitation Tournament (NIT).
- 1952 – St. Olaf College joined the MCAC in the 1952–53 academic year.
- 1958 – Beloit College applied to return to the league and was subsequently reinstated as a founding member.
- 1974:
  - St. Olaf left the MCAC after the 1973–74 academic year.
  - Lake Forest College joined the MCAC in the 1974–75 academic year.
- 1976 – The University of Chicago joined the MCAC in the 1976–77 academic year.
- 1982 – Illinois College and St. Norbert College joined the MCAC in the 1982–83 academic year.
- 1983 – Carleton left the MCAC to rejoin the MIAC after the 1982–83 academic year.
- 1987 – University of Chicago left the MCAC to join the University Athletic Association (UAA) after the 1986–87 academic year.
- 1992 – Carroll College (now Carroll University) joined the MCAC in the 1992–93 academic year.
- 1994 – The MCAC has rebranded when the conference merged with the women's-only Midwest Athletic Conference for Women (MACW; founded since the 1977–78 school year) to become the Midwest Conference (MWC), effective beginning the 1994–95 academic year.
- 1997 – Coe and Cornell College left the MWC to join the Iowa Intercollegiate Athletic Conference (now the American Rivers Conference [ARC]) after the 1996–97 academic year.
- 2012 – Cornell College rejoined the MWC in the 2012–13 academic year.
- 2014 – Macalester College joined the MWC as an affiliate member for football in the 2014 fall season (2014–15 academic year).
- 2016 – Carroll left the MWC to join the College Conference of Illinois and Wisconsin (CCIW) after the 2015–16 academic year.
- 2017 – University of Chicago rejoined the MWC, but as an affiliate member for football in the 2017 season (2017–18 academic year).
- 2018 – University of Chicago added baseball into its MWC affiliate membership in the 2019 season (2018–19 academic year).
- 2021:
  - St. Norbert left the MWC as a full member to join the Northern Athletics Collegiate Conference (NACC) after the 2020–21 academic year. St. Norbert would remain as an affiliate member for men's and women's swimming & diving.
  - Macalester left the MWC as an affiliate member for football after the 2020 fall season (2020–21 academic year).
- 2024 – University of Chicago left the MWC as an affiliate member for baseball after the 2024 season (2023–24 academic year).
- 2025 – The Milwaukee School of Engineering (MSOE) joined the MWC as an affiliate member for men's and women's swimming & diving in the 2025–26 academic year.
- 2026 – Luther College joined the MWC, beginning in the 2026–27 academic year.

== Member schools ==
Every member in the history of the MWC and its predecessor conferences, whether full, affiliate, current, or former, has been a private school.

=== Current members ===
Former Midwest Conference until spring 2022

The MWC currently has ten full members.

Institution	Location	Founded	Affiliation	Enrollment	Nickname	Joined (Note: Represents the calendar year when fall sports competition begins.)	Colors
Beloit College	Beloit, Wisconsin	1846	Nonsectarian	1,358	Buccaneers	1921	College Blue & Vegas Gold
Cornell College	Mount Vernon, Iowa	1853	United Methodist	1,176	Rams	1921, 2012 (Note: Cornell left the MWC to join the Iowa Intercollegiate Athletic Conference (IIAC; now known as the American Rivers Conference) after the 1996–97 school year; before rejoining in the 2012–13 school year.)	Purple & White
Grinnell College	Grinnell, Iowa	1846	Nonsectarian (Note: Historically related to the United Church of Christ.)	1,638	Pioneers	1940	Scarlet & Black
Illinois College	Jacksonville, Illinois	1829	UCC & PCUSA	1,029	Blueboys & Lady Blues	1982	Blue & Grey & White
Knox College	Galesburg, Illinois	1837	Nonsectarian	1,058	Prairie Fire	1921	Purple & Gold
Lake Forest College	Lake Forest, Illinois	1857	Nonsectarian	1,395	Foresters	1974	Red & Black
Lawrence University	Appleton, Wisconsin	1847	Nonsectarian	1,489	Vikings	1921	Blue & Grey & White
Luther College	Decorah, Iowa	1861	Lutheran ELCA	1,384	Norse	2026	Blue & white
Monmouth College	Monmouth, Illinois	1853	Presbyterian (PCUSA)	767	Fighting Scots	1924	Red & White
Ripon College	Ripon, Wisconsin	1851	Nonsectarian	766	Red Hawks	1923	Red & White

=== Affiliate members ===
The MWC currently has three affiliate members.

Institution	Location	Founded	Affiliation	Enrollment	Nickname	Joined (Note: Represents the calendar year when fall sports competition begins.)	MWC sport(s)	Primary conference
University of Chicago (Note: Chicago had been a full member of the MWC from 1976–77 to 1986–87.) (Note: Chicago competed in the MWC as an affiliate member for baseball from the 2019 to 2024 spring seasons (2018–19 to 2023–24 school years).)	Chicago, Illinois	1890	Nonsectarian	13,400	Maroons	2017	Football	University (UAA)
Milwaukee School of Engineering	Milwaukee, Wisconsin	1903	Nonsectarian	2,122	Raiders	2025	Men's swimming & diving	Northern (NACC)
Milwaukee School of Engineering	Milwaukee, Wisconsin	1903	Nonsectarian	2,122	Raiders	2025	Women's swimming & diving	Northern (NACC)
St. Norbert College (Note: St. Norbert had been a full member of the MWC from 1982–83 to 2020–21.)	De Pere, Wisconsin	1898	Catholic (Premonstratensians)	2,095	Green Knights	2021	Men's swimming & diving	Northern (NACC)
St. Norbert College	De Pere, Wisconsin	1898	Catholic (Premonstratensians)	2,095	Green Knights	2021	Women's swimming & diving	Northern (NACC)

=== Former members ===
The MWC had eight former full members.

Institution	Location	Founded	Affiliation	Enrollment	Nickname	Joined (Note: Represents the calendar year when fall sports competition begins.)	Left (Note: Represents the calendar year when spring sports competition ends.)	Current conference
Carleton College	Northfield, Minnesota	1866	Nonsectarian	2,105	Knights	1921; 1946	1941; 1983	Minnesota (MIAC)
Carroll University	Waukesha, Wisconsin	1846	Presbyterian (PCUSA)	2,789	Pioneers	1992	2016	Illinois–Wisconsin (CCIW)
University of Chicago (Note: Chicago has rejoined the MWC as an affiliate member for football.)	Chicago, Illinois	1890	Nonsectarian	7,559	Maroons	1976	1987	University (UAA)
Coe College	Cedar Rapids, Iowa	1851	Presbyterian (PCUSA)	1,355	Kohawks	1921	1997	American Rivers (ARC)
Hamline University	St. Paul, Minnesota	1854	United Methodist	1,944	Pipers	1922	1930	Minnesota (MIAC)
Millikin University	Decatur, Illinois	1901	Presbyterian (PCUSA)	2,200	Big Blue	1922	1925	Illinois–Wisconsin (CCIW)
St. Norbert College (Note: St. Norbert has remained in the MWC as an affiliate member for swimming & diving.)	De Pere, Wisconsin	1898	Catholic (Premonstratensians)	2,095	Green Knights	1982	2021	Northern (NACC)
St. Olaf College	Northfield, Minnesota	1874	Lutheran ELCA	2,900	Oles	1955	1974	Minnesota (MIAC)

=== Former affiliate members ===
The MWC had two former affiliate members.

Institution	Location	Founded	Affiliation	Enrollment	Nickname	Joined (Note: Represents the calendar year when fall sports competition begins.)	Left (Note: Represents the calendar year when spring sports competition ends.)	MWC sport	Primary conference
University of Chicago (Note: Chicago had been a full member of the MWC from 1976–77 to 1986–87.) (Note: Chicago remains in the MWC as an affiliate member for football.)	Chicago, Illinois	1890	Nonsectarian	13,400	Maroons	2018	2024	Baseball	University (UAA)
Macalester College	Saint Paul, Minnesota	1874	Presybterian (PCUSA)	2,221	Scots	2014	2021	Football	Minnesota (MIAC)

=== Membership timeline ===
Full member (all sports) Full member (non-football) Associate member (football) Associate member (sport)

== Sports ==
Conference sports
Sport	Men's	Women's
Baseball	✓	
Basketball	✓	✓
Cross Country	✓	✓
Football	✓	
Golf	✓	✓
Soccer	✓	✓
Softball		✓
Swimming & Diving	✓	✓
Tennis	✓	✓
Track & Field (Indoor)	✓	✓
Track & Field (Outdoor)	✓	✓
Volleyball		✓

=== Men's sports ===
School	Baseball	Basketball	Cross Country	Football	Golf	Soccer	Swimming & Diving	Tennis	Track & Field (Indoor)	Track & Field (Outdoor)	Total MWC Sports
Beloit	✓	✓	✓	✓	✗	✓	✓	✗	✓	✓	8
Cornell	✓	✓	✓	✓	✗	✓	✗	✓	✓	✓	8
Grinnell	✓	✓	✓	✓	✓	✓	✓	✓	✓	✓	10
Illinois College	✓	✓	✓	✓	✓	✓	✓ (Note: Swimming only)	✓	✓	✓	10
Knox	✓	✓	✓	✓	✓	✓	✗	✗	✓	✓	8
Lake Forest	✗	✓	✓	✓	✓	✓	✓	✓	✓	✓	9
Lawrence	✓	✓	✓	✓	✗	✓	✓	✓	✓	✓	9
Luther	✓	✓	✓	✓	✓	✓	✓	✓	✓	✓	10
Monmouth	✓	✓	✓	✓	✓	✓	✓	✓	✓	✓	10
Ripon	✓	✓	✓	✓	✗	✓	✓	✓	✓	✓	9
Totals	9	10	10	10+1	6	10	8+2	8	10	10	91+3
Affiliate Members
Chicago				✓							1
MSOE							✓				1
St. Norbert							✓				1

==== Men's varsity sports not sponsored by the Midwest that are played by Midwest schools ====
School	Bowling	Fencing	Handball	Ice Hockey	Lacrosse	Volleyball	Wrestling
Beloit				WIAC	NACC		
Cornell					NACC		IND
Lake Forest			✓	NCHA	NACC	NACC	
Lawrence		IND		NCHA	NACC		
Luther	✓						IND

=== Women's sports ===
School	Basketball	Cross Country	Golf	Soccer	Softball	Swimming & Diving	Tennis	Track & Field (Indoor)	Track & Field (Outdoor)	Volleyball	Total MWC Sports
Beloit	✓	✓	✗	✓	✓	✓	✗	✓	✓	✓	8
Cornell	✓	✓	✗	✓	✓	✗	✓	✓	✓	✓	8
Grinnell	✓	✓	✓	✓	✓	✓	✓	✓	✓	✓	10
Illinois College	✓	✓	✓	✓	✓	✓ (Note: Swimming only)	✓	✓	✓	✓	10
Knox	✓	✓	✓	✓	✓	✗	✗	✓	✓	✓	8
Lake Forest	✓	✓	✓	✓	✓	✓	✓	✓	✓	✓	10
Lawrence	✓	✓	✗	✓	✓	✓	✓	✓	✓	✓	9
Luther	✓	✓	✓	✓	✓	✓	✓	✓	✓	✓	10
Monmouth	✓	✓	✓	✓	✓	✓	✓	✓	✓	✓	10
Ripon	✓	✓	✗	✓	✓	✓	✓	✓	✓	✓	9
Totals	10	10	6	10	10	8+2	8	10	10	10	92+2
Affiliate Members
MSOE						✓					1
St. Norbert						✓					1

==== Women's varsity sports not sponsored by the Midwest that are played by Midwest schools ====
School	Bowling	Fencing	Flag Football	Handball	Ice Hockey	Lacrosse	Wrestling
Beloit					WIAC	NACC	
Cornell			✓			NACC	IND
Illinois College			✓				
Knox			✓				
Lake Forest				✓	NCHA	NACC	
Lawrence		IND	2027-28		NCHA	NACC	
Luther	✓						IND
Ripon			✓				

== Conference facilities ==
School	Football field	Capacity	Basketball arena	Capacity	Baseball field
Beloit	Strong Stadium	3,000	Flood Arena	2,500	Ballpark at Strong Stadium
Chicago	Stagg Field	1,650	Member only in football		
Cornell	Ash Park Stadium	2,500	Multi-Sport Center	2,000	Ash Park Field
Grinnell	Rosenbloom Field	5,000	Darby Gym	1,250	Grinnell Baseball Diamond
Illinois College	England Stadium	3,000	Sherman Gymnasium	1,600	Joe Brooks Field
Knox	Knosher Bowl	4,000	Memorial Gym	3,000	Blodgett Field
Lake Forest	Farwell Field	1,000	Lake Forest Sports Center	1,200	No Baseball Team
Lawrence	Banta Bowl	5,255	Alexander Gym	1,280	Whiting Field
Luther	Legacy Field in Carlson Stadium	5,000	Birkestrand Family Court	1,650	Luther Baseball Field
Monmouth	Bobby Woll Memorial Field	2,000	Glennie Gymnasium	1,600	Glasgow Field
Ripon	Hopp Stadium	2,000	Willmore Center	1,200	Francis Field

== See also ==
- Midwest Conference men's basketball tournament
- 2026 Midwest Conference football season
