= Sherburn Wightman =

American football player and coach (1882–1930)

Profile
- Position: Fullback

Personal information
- Born: September 5, 1882; Marysville, California, U.S.
- Died: October 2, 1930 (aged 48); Hammond, Indiana, U.S.

Career information
- College: Chicago; Swarthmore

Career history

Playing
- Massillon Tigers (1906); "All-Massillons" (1907); Dover Giants (1908)

Coaching
- Massillon Tigers (1906); "All-Massillons" (1907); Dover Giants (1908)

Awards and highlights
- 1906 Ohio League Champs; 1907 Ohio League Champs

Sherburne Henry Wightman (September 5, 1882 – October 2, 1930) was a professional American football player-coach in the "Ohio League", which was the direct predecessor to the modern National Football League (NFL). He is best remembered for coaching the Massillon Tigers to an Ohio League title in 1906, over the Canton Bulldogs, which led to accusations of a betting scandal. In 1907, he coached a version of the Massillon Tigers called the "All-Massillons" to another Ohio League title. Prior to his professional career, Wightman played at the college level for the Chicago Maroons, under Amos Alonzo Stagg, and Swarthmore College.

== Massillon Tigers ==
Wightman was named the coach of the Massillon Tigers in 1906 after E. J. Stewart was promoted to the title of team manager. Wightman's first order of business was to replace four of the Tigers players who were a part of the club's 1905 Ohio League championship. Quarterback Jack Hayden, tackle Jack Lang, guard Herman Kerkhoff, and end Clark Schrontz were all convince to play for the Bulldogs in 1906 by Canton coach Blondy Wallace. Wightman replaced Kerkhoff with, an ex-teammate from his playing days at Chicago and Swarthmore, Tiny Maxwell. Meanwhile, Ted Nesser and E.P. King were signed to solidify the offensive line. However, the biggest signing for Wightman was the signing of Peggy Parratt as the team's new quarterback.

At the end of the season, Canton and Massillon decided to play a two game home-and-home series to determine the 1906 Ohio League champions. Homer Davidson, who was considered the best kicker of the era was also signed by Wightman for the game, just in case Massillon needed a field goal or extra point. Under the rules of the series, the winners of game 2 would be the league champs. The first game went to Canton by a score of 10–5. However, Massillon won the rematch 13–6 and was named the Ohio League's 1906 champions.

=== Scandal ===
After the series was over, both teams and their fans heard rumors that the second game of the series was fixed. One story suggested that Canton players had bet large amounts of money on themselves to win, while approaching the Massillon players and asking them to throw the game in exchange for a share of Canton's winnings. However, Wightman was accused of being behind the scandal by Massillon end Walter East. As proof that Wightman was at the root of the fix attempt, East furnished the Akron Beacon-Journal a copy of a contract in which Wightman agreed to have the November 16 game thrown for $4,000. It was signed by East, John T. Windsor, one of the owners of the Akron Giants baseball team, and Wightman. After reading East's charges, Wightman gave an interview to The Plain Dealer in which he stated: "Anything and everything I did in conjunction with East and Windsor was done in accordance with instruction from Manager Stewart and the backers of the Massillon team. When East first came to me with his scheme I reported his proposition to my employers and they told me to go ahead with it and see to what lengths East would go. Consequently, I strung them along until I had the signatures of East and Windsor down on paper. When that was done East was released, and it was seen that we had gold- bricked them. Consequently the great plunging of the first game on the part of the bettors did not take place. East's statement does not worry me in the least, for I am innocent of any attempt to pull off any dishonesty." E.J Stewart backed up Wightman's statement. Meanwhile, Dr. Harry March stated in his 1934 book Pro Football: Its Ups and Downs, which documented the scandal, that Wallace persuaded a Canton player to deliberately throw the game. Wallace later filed a libel lawsuit against Stewart and his newspaper, the Massillon Independent, for $25,000. The case was settled out of court.

The scandal still remains a mystery to this day and was said to have ruined professional football in Ohio until the mid-1910s. However, some historians argue that the expense of placing all-star teams on the field each week also put a hamper on the sport. The Canton Morning News put a $20,000 price tag on the Massillon Tigers 1906 team, while many speculate that the Bulldogs probably cost even more.

== "All-Massillons" ==
The Tigers reorganized into the "All-Massillons" in 1907, after which professional football in Massillon effectively stopped. The team was made up of many of the former Tigers players and was coached and managed by Wightman. The team defeated the Columbus Panhandles, with the Nesser Brothers in the line-up, 13-4, and celebrated its fifth consecutive state championship. Because of that game's importance, Massillon brought in two ringers, Peggy Parratt and Bob Shiring.

The next season Wightman and several ex-Massillom players traveled to Canal Dover and played for the Dover Giants. While the Giants had never been a major factor in the "Ohio League", the transfusion of the ex-Tigers players instantly made them a powerhouse. The Giants claimed the 1908 state championship at the end of the season, however the claim received little support outside of Dover since they played a weak schedule.
