= Jack Lang (American football) =

American football player

Profile
- Position: Tackle

Personal information
- Born: April 10, 1875; Scotland
- Died: November 22, 1923 (aged 48); Dunlo, Pennsylvania, U.S.

Career information
- College: Susquehanna; Washington & Jefferson

Career history

Playing
- 1899: Susquehanna
- 1900: Latrobe Athletic Association
- 1901: Washington & Jefferson
- 1902: Pittsburgh Stars
- 1903: Franklin Athletic Club
- 1904–1905: Massillon Tigers
- 1906: Canton Bulldogs
- 1903–1905, 1907: Latrobe Athletic Association

Coaching
- 1905: Westminster (PA)

Awards and highlights
- NFL Champs (1902); "U.S. Pro Football Title" (1903); World Series Football Champs (1903); 2x Ohio League Champs (1904, 1905)

John Lang (April 10, 1875 – November 22, 1923) was an American professional football player. In 1902 he won a championship in the first National Football League with the Pittsburgh Stars. A year later he was a member of the Franklin Athletic Club football team that was considered the "best in the world". He also won the 1903 World Series of Football, held at Madison Square Garden, with the Franklin Athletic Club.

Lang then spent the 1904 and 1905 seasons with the Massillon Tigers of the Ohio League. In 1906, he was convinced by Blondy Wallace, coach of the Canton Bulldogs to join the Bulldogs. He jumped from the Tigers to the Bulldogs along with Jack Hayden, Herman Kerkhoff, and Clark Schrontz. That season Canton played Massillon in a two game home-and-home series to determine the 1906 Ohio League championship. While Canton won the first game of the series, Massillon won the second game (and under rules determined by both team) the championship. Canton was later accused of throwing the championship in a betting scandal.

Jack began his football career playing tackle for Susquehanna University. He joined the professional Latrobe team for the 1900 season, then went to college again to play for Washington & Jefferson.

During and after his years with Franklin and Massillon, he maintained ties with the Latrobe club, appearing for them intermittently in 1903–1905 and again in 1907.

Lang also coached the 1905 Westminster College team of New Wilmington, Pennsylvania, leading the team to a 9–2 record.

== Head coaching record ==
Year	Team	Overall	Conference	Standing	Bowl/playoffs
Westminster Titans (Independent) (1905)
1905	Westminster	9–2			
Westminster:		9–2			
Total:		9–2			
