= Dan Policowski =

American football player

Dan "Bullet" Riley
Profile
- Position: End

Career history
- 1904–1906: Massillon Tigers
- 1907: "All-Massillons"
- 1910: Shelby Tigers
- 1911: Shelby Blues
- 1912: Toledo Overlands

Awards and highlights
- 6× Ohio League champion (1904, 1905, 1906, 1907, 1910, 1911); Caught first forward pass in professional game (1906)

Dan Policowski was an early professional football player for the Massillon Tigers from 1904 to 1906. Originally from Canton, Ohio, which was the home of the Tigers', rival the Canton Bulldogs, Policowski played end under the alias Dan Riley. He was also known as "Bullet Riley".

== Forward pass ==
On October 25, 1906, Policowski made professional football history when he caught a short pass from Massillon quarterback Peggy Parratt. This was the first recorded use of the forward pass in professional football game. However, it is unknown if it was truly the first use of the pass in a professional game, since Parratt may have used it even earlier.

Eddie Wood was erroneously credited for catching the first forward pass in pro football by Harry March in his book Pro Football: Its Ups and Downs. During the second game of the 1906 Ohio League championship, which would later result in a betting scandal on November 24, 1906, Wood reportedly caught a couple of the new forward passes. March somehow stated that those catches in a championship game, at the end of the season, were very first catches in professional football. It was later discovered that Parratt threw an earlier recorded pass to Policowski on October 25, for professional football's first forward pass. A second recorded pass was thrown to Clark Schrontz two days later.

== After Massillon ==
The Tigers and Bulldogs left football in 1906 after the events Canton Bulldogs-Massillon Tigers Betting Scandal. In 1907 he played for the "All-Massillon" team, which featured most of Tigers line-up. In 1910, Policowski played for the Shelby Tigers, while in 1911, he played for the Shelby Blues. A year later Policowski played for the Toledo Overlands. During a game against the Detroit Wolverines, he grabbed a fumble at Detroit's three yard line and ran it in for a touchdown.
