= Herman Kerkhoff =

American football player (1870–1935)

Herman Charles Kerkhoff
Profile
- Position: Left guard

Personal information
- Born: May 10, 1870; Lafayette, Indiana, U.S.
- Died: December 3, 1935; Lafayette, Indiana, U.S.
- Listed height: 6 ft 5 in (1.96 m)
- Listed weight: 235 lb (107 kg)

Career information
- College: Purdue

Career history
- 1895 (1892–1894 allegedly under assumed name): Purdue University Boilermakers
- 1896–1897(one gm): Indianapolis Athletic Association
- 1897–1898: Chicago Athletic Association
- 1899–1901: Denver Athletic Club
- 1902: Pittsburgh Stars
- 1903: Franklin Athletic Club
- 1904–1905: Massillon Tigers
- 1906: Canton Bulldogs

Awards and highlights
- 1899 All Colorado Team Silver and Gold December 25, 1899, edition; National Football League champion (1902); "World Champion" (1903); World Series of Football champion (1903); 2x Ohio League champion (1904, 1905)

Herman Charles Kerkhoff (May 10, 1870 – December 3, 1935) was an American professional football player from the mid 1890s until 1906.

He resided in Lafayette, Indiana, most of his life, working on the Kerkhoff family dairy farm and later his own farm. He was one of ten children born to John and Elizabeth Kerkhoff. His great size and exceptional speed allowed him to travel the country playing football for the highest bidder of his services.

After stints with the Oakland Hill Bumpers of Tippecanoe County, Indiana, Indianapolis Athletic Association, Chicago Athletic Association, and Denver Athletic Club, Bumper was signed by the Pittsburgh Stars of the first National Football League in 1902, the self-proclaimed "World's Greatest" Franklin Athletic Club in 1903, the Massillon Tigers in 1904 and 1905, and the Canton Athletic Club (renamed the Canton Bulldogs) in 1906. He was regarded as one of the best offensive linemen from his era.

He ran for sheriff of Tippecanoe County, Indiana, in 1906 on the Democratic ticket, losing narrowly. The Republican ticket was victorious in all Tippecanoe County elections in 1906.

Herman, who was also called Bumper, Kerky, Kerk, and Hermie, married Mary Lynch February 14, 1900. The couple had three children (Marie born 10–7–1901, Katherine born 5–6–04, Herman Joseph born 9–4–1908). Middle child Katherine died from illness on December 28, 1911, at the age of seven on the large family farm in Monitor Springs, Indiana, just east of Lafayette.

The Kerkhoff family of four moved to southeast Missouri in 1911, and attempted to continue farming on a great parcel of land. The family fortune was lost, and the family returned to Lafayette in late 1915.

Herman was sworn in as a Lafayette policeman August 18, 1920. He passed at his home in Lafayette on December 3, 1935.

== Early career ==
Prior to his professional career, Herman played one documented season at Purdue University. He registered at Purdue as a "Special Student" in October 1895 before the Boilermakers played any games. He started all six games at left guard for the Boilermakers scoring a touchdown in an 18–4 win versus Minnesota. Purdue finished 4–3, one win was a forfeit victory Purdue claims versus Iowa State University.

It is believed he also suited up for Purdue in 1892–1894 under an assumed name which was a common practice at the time for quality footballers and midwest collegiate football programs. No proof of participation has been documented.

He also played football games for local Indiana teams including the Oakland Hill Bumpers (in Lafayette), Delphi, Frankfort, and Attica.

It is believed he also played for the orange-and-black-clad Pine Village Villagers on occasion, but no proof of participation has been documented.

Herman Kerkhoff was added to the Purdue University Football Media Guide as an 1895 football letter winner in 2019 after documentation was submitted on his behalf by his great-great-grandson William A. Fusiek and his triple great-granddaughter Claire Fusiek.

== Professional career ==
Kerchoff began his professional career with the Indianapolis Artillery football team, which changed its name to the Indianapolis Athletic Association before the opening game in 1896.

He was recruited to play for the Chicago Athletic Association by CAA football manager and former player, and future Chicago mayor, William Hale Thompson. The IAA "Gunners" "Athletics" "Cannoneers" played in Chicago several times in 1896, including twice versus the CAA. In 1896, the IAA unveiled its all-yellow football uniforms in a football game versus the Chicago Cycling Club in Chicago.

Kerkhoff and his "Cherry Circle" teammates claimed the mythical athletic association championship in 1897 after finishing the season 7–1. the CAA played two practice games versus Northwestern University that were somewhat controlled and scripted by the respective coaches; and thus, should not be counted as legitimate competitive games. The Athletics only loss was 16–6 at highly acclaimed Yale late in the season. Kerkhoff played one game for the IAA Athletics and the remainder of the 1897 season and the 1898 campaign for the CAA.

From 1899 to 1901 Kerkhoff suited up for the "Cherry and Black" DAC Denver Athletic Club football team. His skills earned him mentions as "the most feared lineman in the west" at that time. The "guards back" play enabled the extremely fleet footed wonder boy milkman from Lafayette to score touchdowns and become a Denver hero. The 1899 squad finished 7–0, claiming the athletic association champions of the west crown. The Athletics allowed only six points all season. Kerkhoff was named to the “All Colorado Team” by several sources in the 1899 “Silver and Gold” football season summary edition.

In 1902, he helped the Pittsburgh Stars win the first and only "inaugural" NFL championship over the Philadelphia Athletics and the Philadelphia Phillies. That version of the National Football League lasted only one year and was not related to the modern NFL. He missed two games during the Stars season with a broken hand, vowing to play with a cage on it, if necessary. He played one game for Pittsburgh in coal miner boots because his huge cleats were on special order. The Pittsburgh team was managed by Dave Berry and played home games in Pittsburgh at The Colosseum. The Stars also practiced and played “home” games in Greensburg, Pennsylvania.

He was signed at the conclusion of the Pittsburgh season by Dave Printz and became a member of the Franklin Athletic Club, which won the 1903 "World Championship" or American Championship Tournament at Madison Square Garden in New York. Historians later renamed this event the 1903 World Series of Football. Herman scored both touchdowns in the 12–0 title clinching win versus Watertown Red and Black from New York. In a practice that was common at that time, Kerkhoff, his teammates, and residents of Franklin wagered large sums of money on the games, and returned to Franklin as wealthy heroes.

In 1904, Kerkhoff joined the Massillon, Ohio, team and in his first game for the squad, he helped Massillon record a key 44–0 win over the Pittsburgh Lyceum. He also contributed in a 28–0 victory over the Shelby Blues, and a 63–0 victory over the Sharon Buhl Club, the self-proclaimed champions of the western Pennsylvania football circuit. The 1904 and 1905 Tigers were unbeaten and claimed the Ohio League championships both years.

In 1906, Herman semi-retired from football to pursue a life in politics. Kerkhoff ran for public office as Sheriff of Tippecanoe County Indiana in 1906 as a Democrat. After losing in the election, Canton's coach, Blondy Wallace, signed Kerkhoff and several other Massillon players to his Canton team. (To replace Kerkhoff, Massillon signed Tiny Maxwell.)

Canton and Massillon matched money offers until Canton finally offered more, so Herman joined the Bulldogs before the scheduled two-game home and home series against Massillon, which would determine the 1906 "Ohio League" champions. Canton won the first game 10–5; but the second game and the championship was won by Massillon (13–6). It was alleged the players "fixed" the games to necessitate a third “big money” winner-take-all game to be held in Cleveland. The events surrounding the series resulted in accusations of a betting scandal.
