= Eddie Wood =

American football player

Profile
- Position: End

Personal information
- Born: November 29, 1879; Indiana, Pennsylvania, U.S.
- Died: April 29, 1926 (aged 46); Indiana, Pennsylvania, U.S.

Career information
- College: Washington & Jefferson

Career history
- 1895–1901: Latrobe Athletic Association
- 1898: Western Pennsylvania All-Stars
- 1902: Philadelphia Phillies
- 1903: Franklin Athletic Club
- 1904–06: Latrobe Athletic Association
- 1906: Canton Bulldogs

Awards and highlights
- 3× W. Pennsylvania champ (1903, 1904, 1905); World Series of Football Champion (1903); "Westmoreland County Champs" (1895)

Edwin Kimmell Wood (November 29, 1879 – April 29, 1926) was an early professional football player for the Latrobe Athletic Association, the Franklin Athletic Club and finally for the Canton Bulldogs of the "Ohio League". He also played on Dave Berry's Western Pennsylvania All-Star team, a collection of early football star players, that was designed to compete with the star-heavy Duquesne Country and Athletic Club on December 3, 1898, at Exposition Park in Pittsburgh. In 1902 he played in the first National Football League for the Philadelphia Phillies. He also played for Franklin when it won the 1903 World Series of Football over the Watertown Red & Black at Madison Square Garden. Wood later became one of the first professional players to catch forward passes when they became legal in 1906.

== 1906 scandal ==
Wood had a brief, but memorable, stint with the Canton Bulldogs. He played in just one game for team in 1906, but the game was for the "Ohio League" championship and was fought against Canton's rival, the Massillon Tigers. Wood was hired by Bulldogs coach, Blondy Wallace, to play in the game after a player named "Gilchrist" became injured. The game resulted in a 13-6 Canton loss and the events following the game later became known as the Canton Bulldogs–Massillon Tigers betting scandal. Wood was hinted as being persuaded by Wallace to throw the game for a profit in a, historically dismissed, 1934 book by Dr. Harry March entitled, Pro Football: Its Ups and Downs.

Of the incident, March stated that Wallace persuaded a Canton player to deliberately throw the game. When accused by his teammates this player said he had simply obeyed orders. The player then quickly left town, on the first available train, while still in his uniform. However, this player, mentioned by March, was obviously Eddie Wood of Latrobe. March gave the impression that he was running for his life from angry fans and teammates, however, even before the second Canton-Massillon game began, it was announced that Wood would be on the first train back to Latrobe once the game ended. Not to mention that when Wood returned on the following Thursday with the Latrobe team, he was not attacked by the fans or his teammates. Also during the second Canton-Massillon game, Wood scored the Bulldogs only score of the game. As for following Wallace's orders, Wood often crashed the middle of the field on defense, allowing the Tigers to escape outside. However, Massillon was historically known for running up the middle of field.

== First forward pass ==
Wood was erroneously credited for catching the first forward pass in pro football by Harry March in his book Pro Football: Its Ups and Downs. During the second game of the Bulldogs-Tigers scandal on November 24, 1906, Wood reportedly caught a couple of the new forward passes. March somehow stated that those catches in a championship game, at the end of the season, were very first catches in professional football. It was later discovered that Peggy Parratt threw an earlier recorded pass to Bullet Riley on October 25, for professional football's first forward pass. A second recorded pass was thrown to Clark Schrontz two days later.
