= Paul Steinberg =

American football player (1880–1964)

Paul "Twister" Steinberg

Profile
- Positions: Fullback, tailback

Personal information
- Born: June 4, 1880; New York City, New York, U.S.
- Died: February 1964 (aged 83)
- Listed height: 5 ft 11 in (1.80 m)
- Listed weight: 210 lb (95 kg)

Career information
- College: Navy, Colgate

Career history
- 1900–1901: Syracuse Athletic Association
- 1902: Philadelphia Athletics
- 1903: Franklin Athletic Club
- 1905: Canton Athletic Club
- 1906: Canton Bulldogs

Awards and highlights
- Football World Series Champion (1903); "World Football Champion" (1903); 2× Ohio League Runner-up (1905, 1906); First Jewish pro basketball player

Jacob Paul "Twister" Steinberg (June 4, 1880 – February 1964) was a professional football player in the early 1900s. As a member of the first National Football League (NFL), he played with the Philadelphia Athletics in the first professional night game in history. He also won the 1903 World Series of Football with the Franklin Athletic Club. Steinberg was also the first Jewish professional basketball player. Harry March, dubbed the "Father of Pro Football", referred to Steinberg as, "one of the most elusive, fastest, slickest, shrewdest, and clean backs of the century."

== Biography ==
Steinberg's professional career began after he was discharged from the army in 1900. He first played pro football with the Syracuse Athletic Association. While with Syracuse, Paul also played for the club's pro basketball team, making him the first Jewish basketball player. In 1902, Paul signed with Philadelphia Athletics baseball team, managed by Connie Mack. He remained with the team from 1902 to 1904, however he never appeared in a major league game. However, in 1902 Mack organized and coached a professional football team also called the Philadelphia Athletics. Steinberg played halfback for the Athletics, which won the Philadelphia city title, before losing the league championship to the Pittsburgh Stars.

Steinberg joined the Franklin Athletic Club, located in Pennsylvania. The team was backed by the head of the Carnegie Steel Company was so good that they had difficulty finding opponents. That year Franklin went on to win the Pennsylvania state title. After their championship win Franklin, traveled to New York City, and won the second World Series of Football.

In 1905, Paul moved to Canton, Ohio and played that year with the pre-National Football League version of the Canton Bulldogs, then known as the Canton Athletic Club. In Canton, Steinberg experienced the huge rivalry between Canton and the Massillon Tigers. In 1905, Massillon defeated Steinberg and Canton for the championship and Canton vowed to claim the title the following year. By 1906, Steinberg became known as the Bulldogs' best-known player and remained with Canton as one of the team's top backs. After both Canton and Massillon defeated their regular season opponents, a two-game championship was set up between the two teams. Canton won the first game, 10–5, for the team's biggest victory ever, but Massillon recovered to win the second game, 13–6, claiming the Ohio State Championship for the fourth consecutive year. After the games, however, rumors existed that some Canton players had thrown the game. Disgusted by the allegations, Steinberg quit professional football.

== See also ==
- List of select Jewish football players
