= Walter East =

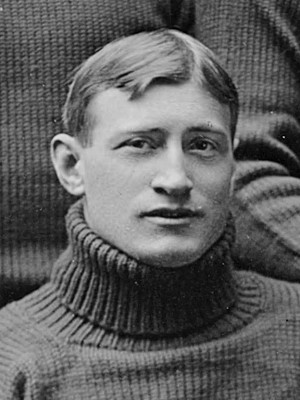
- East with the 1904 WUP football team

Profile
- Position: End

Personal information
- Born: March 29, 1883; Coulterville, Illinois, U.S.
- Died: August 29, 1930 (aged 47); Philadelphia, Pennsylvania, U.S.

Career history

Playing
- 1906: Massillon Tigers

Coaching
- 1909: Akron Zips Basketball team

Awards and highlights
- Key figure in the Canton Bulldogs-Massillon Tigers Betting Scandal

Walter Rufus East (March 29, 1883 – August 29, 1930) was an American minor league baseball player active between 1903 and 1912. As a second baseman he played for various in the Southern Association, Eastern League, Missouri Valley League, Ohio State League and the Ohio–Pennsylvania League. East however also managed several minor league teams from the Ohio–Pennsylvania League.

East attended Geneva College in Beaver Falls, Pennsylvania, where he became a three-sport athlete in football, basketball, and baseball. He went on to study law at the Western University of Pennsylvania (later renamed the University of Pittsburgh), where he played right end for the varsity football teams of 1904 and 1905 that finished 10–0 and 11–2, respectively.

In 1906 he was active in professional football as an end with the Massillon Tigers of the Ohio League, a direct predecessor to the modern-day National Football League. He played his first game for the Tigers on October 20, 1906, in a 57–0 victory over the Shelby Athletic Club. East had a big day and his play was publicly commended. A week later, he played again for Massillon against combined Benwood-Moundsville team in a game that saw Peggy Parratt throw pro football's first forward pass to Bullet Riley. On November 4, 1906, East was reportedly released by the Tigers after having a good game in a 33–0 victory over the Pittsburgh Lyceum. However a scandal later became the reason Massillon's management decided to end their relationship with East.

East is best known for his role fixing a championship football series in 1906 between the Canton Bulldogs and the Massillon Tigers. The scandal began when an allegation was made by a Massillon newspaper charging the Bulldogs coach, Blondy Wallace, and East of conspiring to fix a two-game series between the two clubs. The scandal called for Canton to win the first game and Massillon was to win the second, forcing a third game-with the biggest gate-to be played legitimately, with the championship at stake. Both Wallace and East denied the charges.

East was accused soliciting Tiger players Tiny Maxwell and Bob Shiring to fix the game, but he had been released after the two players told Stewart and Wightman about the attempt. He then returned to Akron, Ohio accusing the Tiger's coach Sherburn Wightman, of masterminding the scandal. According to East, Wightman had first asked him to solicit two of his fellow players to throw the game, then had East find a backer who would pay Wightman $4,000. However Wightman backed out of the deal at the last minute. He later went on to add that no member of the Bulldogs or their backers, as far as he knew, were connected with the deal. He finally stated that the only reason that Tigers manager E.J. Stewart went public on scandal was to ruin the attendance for a future Canton game against the Latrobe Athletic Association. As proof, East produced a contract in which Wightman agreed to throw the game for $4,000. The document was signed by East, Wightman, and John Windsor, one of the owners of the Akron baseball team. Windsor added his, which backed East in all particulars, including the comment that he never had met and still did not know Blondy Wallace. Meanwhile, Massillon management claimed that the contract was used to obtain names of East and Windsor on a contract, East could be released, those persons trying to fix the game would be exposed, and the corrupt East and his crew would be sent away from pro football.

In the aftermath of the scandal, East was seen in Akron as being the hapless victim of a crooked team. He was retained as manager of the Akron Champs. East boasted of fixing a college football game, as well as a baseball game in 1905.

In the summer of 1907, Akron owners', John Windsor and Ben Campbell, argued over retaining East as the Akron manager. The decision led to a fist-fight between the two owners. A reporter humorous wrote "It was the first time two men got into a fight over another man." Bob Quinn then bought the Akron team and kept East on as manager for the 1907 season. In 1908 East coached the Erie Sailors and the Mansfield Brownies in 1912.

East also served as the Akron Zips men's basketball head coach in 1909, when he guided the team to a 6–7 record.

He died suddenly at a hospital during a business trip to Philadelphia, of uremic poisoning, in 1930.

== Baseball managerial record ==
Team	Year	Record	Finish
Akron Buckeyes	1905	66-42	2nd
Akron Rubbernecks	1906	83-55	2nd
Akron Champs	1907	83-53	3rd
Erie Sailors	1908	37-53	8th
Mansfield Brownies	1912	72-67	2nd
