= Vince Stevenson =

American football player (1884–1962)

Profile
- Position: Quarterback

Personal information
- Born: March 1, 1884; Livingston, Kentucky, U.S.
- Died: August 7, 1962 (aged 78); Philadelphia, Pennsylvania, U.S.

Career information
- College: Penn

Career history
- 1906: Canton Bulldogs

Awards and highlights
- National champion (1904); Consensus All-American (1904)
- College Football Hall of Fame

Vincent Stevenson (March 1, 1884 – August 7, 1962) was an American football player. He played college football for the Penn Quakers in 1904 and 1905. In 1904, he earned All-American honors from Walter Camp, after leading his team to a 12–0 record, in which the Quakers outscored their opponents 222–4.

In 1906, Stevenson played professionally for the Canton Bulldogs of the "Ohio League". However, he was injured his knee in the third game of the season and was replaced at quarterback by Twister Steinberg – until he was relieved by Jack Hayden. Stevenson tried to recover and rejoin the team, however the medical consensus was for him to sit out the remainder of the season, so that the bone could heal properly. The injury prevented Stevenson from taking part in Canton's two-game series, against the rival Massillon Tigers, that would result in a scandal.

During the 1910s, he became a crewman on several trans-oceanic oil tankers. World War I was now taking place and these tankers were frequent targets for German U-boats. Although he was reported missing on several occasions, he always showed up unharmed in some distant port.

In 1949, while watching a game between Penn and Cornell, Stevenson proclaimed: "I don't like this two-platoon business," showing his favor having players play on both offense and defense. He was elected to the College Football Hall of Fame in 1968.
