= Jack Hayden (baseball) =

American baseball player (1880–1942)

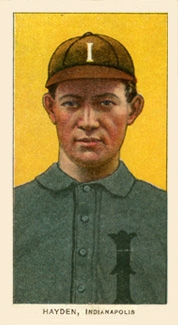
- Outfielder
- Born: October 21, 1880; Bryn Mawr, Pennsylvania, U.S.
- Died: August 3, 1942 (aged 61); Havertown, Pennsylvania, U.S.
- Batted: Left Threw: Left

MLB debut
- August 26, 1901, for the Philadelphia Athletics

Last MLB appearance
- September 26, 1908, for the Chicago Cubs

MLB statistics
- Batting average: .251
- Hits: 145
- Runs: 60
- Home runs: 1
- Runs batted in: 33
- On-base plus slugging: .298
- Stats at Baseball Reference

Teams
- Philadelphia Athletics (1901); Boston Americans (1906); Chicago Cubs (1908)

Jack Hayden
Profile
- Position: Quarterback

Personal information
- Listed height: 5 ft 8 in (1.73 m)
- Listed weight: 170 lb (77 kg)

Career information
- College: Villanova, Penn, Maryland

Career history
- ???: Maryland Athletic Club (Ind.)
- 1902: Philadelphia Athletics (NFL 1902)
- 1903: Franklin A.C. (Ind./WSF)
- 1905: Massillon Tigers (OL)
- 1906: Canton Bulldogs (OL)

Awards and highlights
- 1903 "World Champions"; World Series of Football champion (1903); Ohio League champion (1905)

John Francis Hayden (October 21, 1880 – August 3, 1942) was an American reserve outfielder in Major League Baseball who played between the 1901 and 1908 seasons for the Philadelphia Athletics (1901), Boston Americans (1906) and Chicago Cubs (1908). A native of Bryn Mawr, Pennsylvania, he attended college at Villanova University.

== Baseball ==
In a three-season career, Hayden was a .251 hitter (145-for-578) with one home run and 33 RBI in 147 games, including 60 runs, 14 doubles, eight triples, and 11 stolen bases. He made 146 outfield appearances at right field (112), left (30) and center (4). He later became the manager for the Louisville Colonels.

=== Fight with teammate ===
During a game against the Yankees at Hilltop Park on September 11, 1906, Americans second baseman Hobe Ferris, notorious for his hard style of play, got into a nasty fight with Hayden, who was accused by Ferris of lackadaisical play. After they were separated, Hayden returned to the bench and Ferris ran after him and kicked him in the face. Both were ejected from the game, but Ferris refused to go. Two policemen escorted him to the clubhouse and he was later arrested for assault. After that, Ferris was suspended for the remainder of the season. This was the first time in major league history that teammates had been ejected for fighting with each other.

== Football ==
Outside of baseball, Hayden also played American football professionally and at the college level as a quarterback. Over the span of his career, Hayden played for Villanova, the Penn Quakers, University of Maryland, Maryland Athletic Club and finally the Philadelphia Athletics of the 1902 National Football League. His football career continued in 1903 with the Franklin Athletic Club. In 1905, he was in the line-up for the Massillon Tigers of the "Ohio League". A year later he jumped to the rival Canton Bulldogs after being offered more money to play there by former Franklin teammate, Blondy Wallace. In 1906, he took part in the two football games between Canton and Massillon that were centered on the Canton Bulldogs–Massillon Tigers betting scandal. During the first game of that series against Massillon, Jack ran the team faultlessly and dropkicked a 35-yard field goal in the first half to put the Bulldogs in front 4–0 (field goals were worth 4 points at the time) and was one of the heroes of the game. However, in the team's second game against Massillon, six punts sailed over his head while playing the safety position.

Hayden died in Havertown, Pennsylvania, at age 61.

== Sources ==
- Baseball Reference
- Retrosheet
- Smith, William R. (1980). "Franklin's World Champion Football team" (PDF). Coffin Corner. 2 (Annual). Professional Football Researchers Association: 1–9. Archived from the original (PDF) on November 27, 2010.
- "Blondy Wallace and the Biggest Football Scandal Ever" (PDF). PFRA Annual. 5. Professional Football Researchers Association: 1–16. 1984. Archived from the original (PDF) on December 18, 2010.
