= Lynn Sweet (American football) =

American football player (1881–1918)

Profile
- Positions: Center, Tackle

Personal information
- Born: October 22, 1881
- Died: October 21, 1918 (aged 36); Buffalo, New York, U.S.
- Listed height: 5 ft 7 in (1.70 m)
- Listed weight: 172 lb (78 kg)

Career information
- College: Bucknell, Penn State

Career history
- 1902: Philadelphia Athletics
- 1903: Franklin Athletic Club
- 1905: Canton Athletic Club
- 1906: Canton Bulldogs

Awards and highlights
- 2× World Series of Football winner; "U.S. Pro Football Title" (1903)

Lynn D. (Pop) Sweet (October 22, 1881 – October 21, 1918) was an American professional football player who played with the Philadelphia Athletics in the first National Football League and for the 1903 US Football Champions, the Franklin Athletic Club. Sweet also won, with Franklin, the 1903 World Series of Football, held that December at Madison Square Garden.

Prior to his professional career, he played at the college level. For 3 seasons he played for the Bucknell Bison and then spent his last season of college football with the Penn State Nittany Lions. He died in 1918.

== Sources ==
- Peterson, Robert W. (1997). Pigskin: The Early Years of Pro Football. Oxford University Press. ISBN 0-19-511913-4.
- PFRA Research. "Franklin's Hired Guns: 1903" (PDF). Coffin Corner. Professional Football Researchers Association: 1–3. Archived from the original (PDF) on November 26, 2010.
- Carroll, Bob (1980). "The First Football World Series" (PDF). Coffin Corner. 2 (Annual). Professional Football Researchers Association: 1–8. Archived from the original (PDF) on December 18, 2010.
- Smith, William R. (1981). "Franklin's World Champion Football Team" (PDF). Coffin Corner. 3 (Annual). Professional Football Researchers Association: 1–4. Archived from the original (PDF) on November 27, 2010.
- "Blondy Wallace and the Biggest Football Scandal Ever" (PDF). PFRA Annual. 5. Professional Football Researchers Association: 1–16. 1984. Archived from the original (PDF) on September 28, 2014.
