= Pro Football: Its Ups and Downs =

1934 book by Harry March

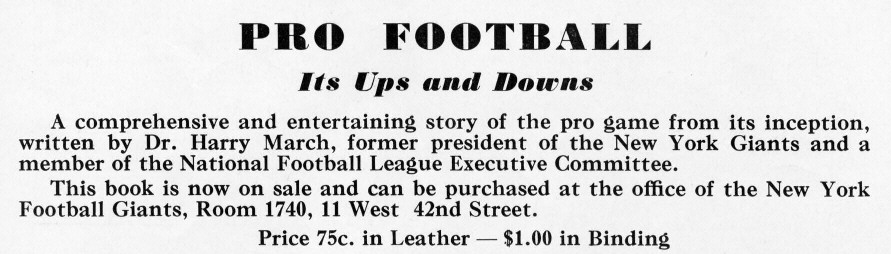
- Advertisement for Pro Football: Its Ups and Downs, 1934
- Author: Dr. Harry March
- Language: English
- Genre: Non-fiction
- Publisher: J.B. Lyon Company
- Publication date: 1934
- Publication place: United States
- Media type: Print (hardback & paperback)
- Pages: 160
- OCLC: 4849231
- Dewey Decimal: 796/.33
- LC Class: GV951 .M3 35000781

Pro Football: Its Ups and Downs, published in 1934, is a book by Dr. Harry March that was the first ever attempt to write a history of professional American football. March had served in several executive offices with the New York Giants of the National Football League in the late 1920s and was a founder of the second American Football League. The book, while popular and entertaining with some important information and interesting anecdotes, is often viewed as inaccurate by modern sports historians. Jack Cusack, manager of the Canton Bulldogs from 1912 to 1917, summed up the book's flaws by stating; "In my library is a book... entitled Pro Football: Its "Ups and Downs" and in my opinion it is something of a historical novel."

While in living in Canton, Ohio, in the early 1900s, March played in or watched hundreds of football games featuring the best professionals of the day such as Christy Mathewson, Fielding Yost, Walter Okeson, Knute Rockne and Pudge Heffelfinger. These experiences would inspire and help him to write the book. However, March had been only peripherally involved with pro football prior to the formation of the NFL and his role with the New York Giants and second AFL. He also only provided a small amount of genuine research into what he wrote about. Instead March relied for his memory and unsubstantiated rumours regarding the details of events that were several decades old. This resulted in March making many factual errors. These inaccuracies were further compounded when later authors and experts wrote about pro football history for the next three decades and borrowed liberally from March's book, apparently never bothering to check his information for accuracy.

The NFL had maintained its own history department, originally led largely by former Rochester Jeffersons owner Leo Lyons, whose work was generally more accurate than March's. In the 1980s, Bob Carroll, executive director of Pro Football Researchers Association and Beau Riffenburgh, the senior writer for the National Football League's publishing branch, NFL Properties, put together the first-ever 17-year history of the NFL's direct predecessor, the "Ohio League" and also the first work to correct many commonly held misconceptions about the early events in pro football and to discount myths that were created by March.

== Inaccuracies ==
Some of the inaccuracies from Pro Football: Its Ups and Downs include:

- John Brallier was the first professional football player in 1895 for the Latrobe Athletic Association. While Brallier honestly believed himself to be the first pro, his word was taken at face value by March. Today it is widely accepted that Pudge Heffelfinger was the first professional football player when he played for the Allegheny Athletic Association in 1892; Heffelfinger denied he ever took money to play football for most of his life, which led to the misconception. Brallier was instead the first openly professional football player. March's book quotes a letter from Dr. Brallier in which the doctor wrote, "I was one of the first to be paid for playing." A caption under photographs of Brallier, on the same page, labels him as, "The First Confessed Pro."
- Several inaccuracies exist regarding March's interpretation of the Canton Bulldogs–Massillon Tigers betting scandal. The event centered around a two-game series between the Canton Bulldogs and the Massillon Tigers in 1906. March practiced medicine in Canton in 1906 and was named one of the Bulldogs team doctors. Of the incident, March stated that Canton coach Blondy Wallace persuaded a Canton player to deliberately throw the game. When accused by his teammates this player said he had simply obeyed orders. The player then quickly left town, on the first available train, while still in his uniform. However, this player, mentioned by March, was obviously Eddie Wood who signed on to play in the game while still being a member of the Latrobe Athletic Association in Pennsylvania. March gave the impression that he was running for his life from angry fans and teammates, however, even before the second Canton-Massillon game began, it was announced that Wood would be on the first train back to Latrobe once the game ended. Not to mention that when Wood returned on the following Thursday with the Latrobe team, he was not attacked by the fans or his teammates. Also during the second Canton-Massillon game, Wood scored the Bulldogs only score of the game. As for following Wallace's orders, Wood often crashed the middle of the field on defense, allowing the Tigers to escape outside. However, Massillon was historically known for running up the middle of field.
- Eddie Wood was also erroneously credited for catching the first forward pass in pro football by Harry March in his book. During the second game of the Bulldogs-Tigers scandal on November 24, 1906, Wood reportedly caught a couple of the new forward passes. March somehow stated that those catches in a championship game, at the end of the season, were very first catches in professional football. It was later discovered that Peggy Parratt threw an earlier "recorded" pass to Bullet Riley on October 25, for professional football's first forward pass. A second recorded pass was thrown to Clark Schrontz two days later on October 27. Instead Wood is credited with being the third person to catch a forward in pro football history.
