= Big Bill Edwards =

American football player (1877–1943)

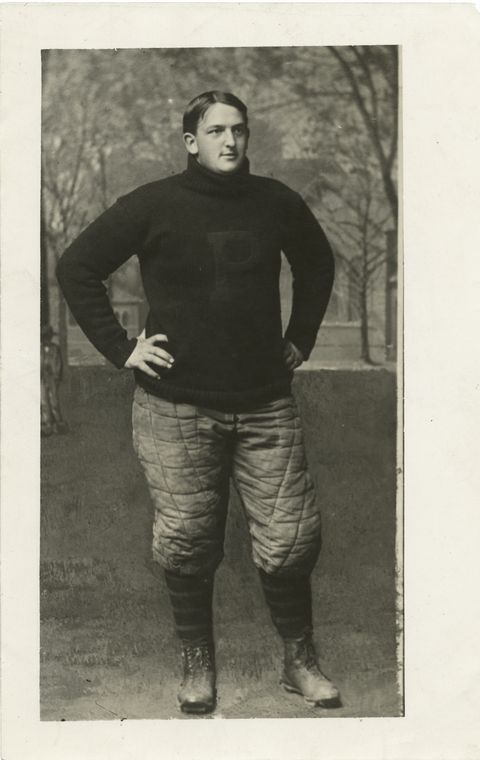

Profile
- Position: Guard

Personal information
- Born: February 23, 1877; Lisle, New York, U.S.
- Died: January 4, 1943 (aged 65); Manhattan, New York City, U.S.

Career information
- College: Princeton (1896–1899)

Awards and highlights
- 2× National champion (1898, 1899); First-team All-American (1899)
- College Football Hall of Fame (Class of 1971)

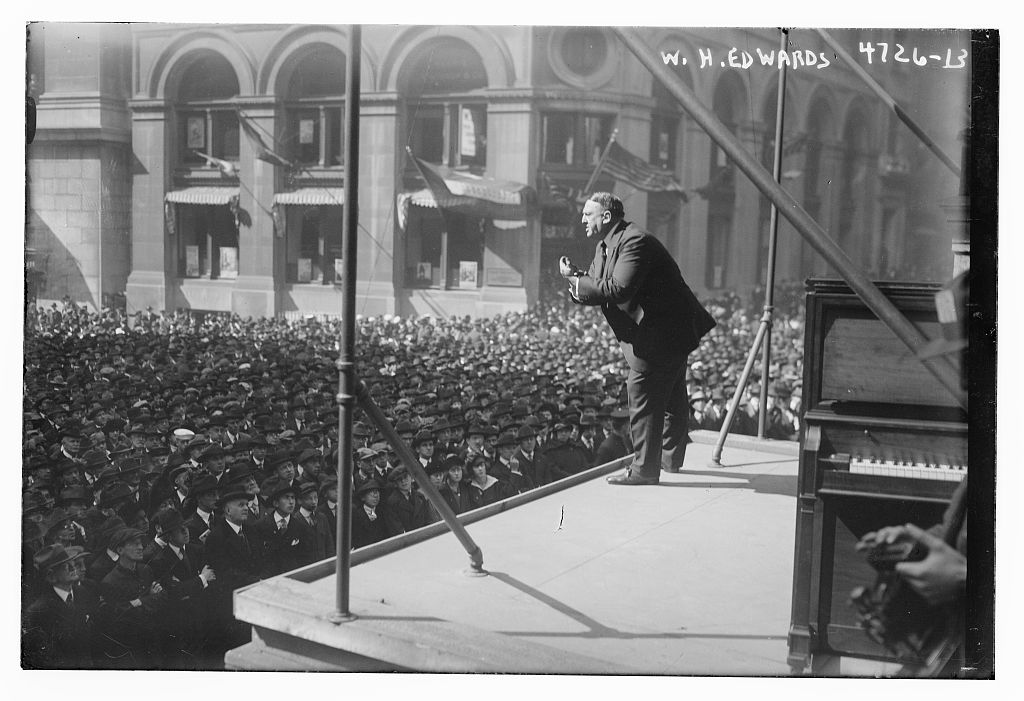
Big Bill Edwards in 1918

William Hanford "Big Bill" Edwards (February 23, 1877 – January 4, 1943) was an American football player who played guard for the Princeton Tigers football team of Princeton University from 1896 to 1899.

== Biography ==
He was born on February 23, 1877, in Lisle, New York.

After graduation, he became an official, and in 1916 wrote a book entitled Football Days, which is perhaps the most extensive first-hand account of American college football in the 19th century.

In 1906, Edwards was the referee for the first game of the "Ohio League" championship between the Canton Bulldogs and the Massillon Tigers. The two-game series was the setting for a game-rigging scandal that eventually resulted in the demise of both teams. During the scandal, members of the Bulldogs were accused of throwing the championship to the Tigers. While Edwards officiated the first game of the series, he was unavailable to referee the second game because of a prior commitment to officiate that year's Harvard–Yale game.

In 1910, he thwarted an attempt on the life of New York mayor William Gaynor by tackling the assailant and sustaining a flesh wound in the arm in the process. For his heroism, Edwards was awarded the Carnegie Medal for Heroism.

Later that decade, U.S. President Woodrow Wilson appointed Edwards as collector of Internal Revenue for New York's Second District.

Edwards was deputy of street cleaning in New York before becoming chief of waste disposal in nearby Newark, New Jersey. In 1926, Edwards became the first president of the first American Football League, which disbanded at the end of the season. Fourteen years later, his name was mentioned as a possible president of the third AFL at the press conference announcing the formation of the league, but he did not serve in that position.

He died on January 4, 1943, in Manhattan, New York City. His funeral was held at Calvary Episcopal Church in Manhattan.

== Legacy ==
He was elected to the College Football Hall of Fame in 1971.

== See also ==
- List of covers of Time magazine (1920s) (October 4, 1926)
