= E. J. Stewart =

American athlete, coach, and administrator (1877–1929)

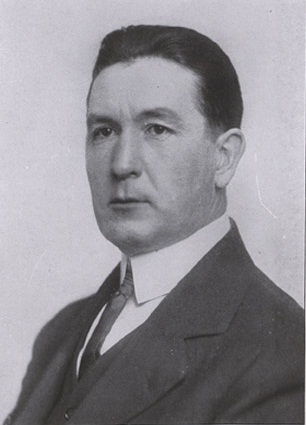
- Stewart from 1917 Cornhusker

Biographical details
- Born: January 26, 1877; Cleveland, Ohio, U.S.
- Died: November 18, 1929 (aged 52) near Kerrville, Texas, U.S.

Playing career

Football
- c. 1900: Western Reserve
- 1903–1906: Massillon Tigers

Basketball
- c. 1900: Western Reserve

Baseball
- c. 1900: Western Reserve
- Position: Quarterback (football)

Coaching career (HC unless noted)

Football
- 1903–1905: Massillon Tigers
- 1907–1908: Mount Union
- 1909–1911: Allegheny
- 1913–1915: Oregon Agricultural
- 1916–1917: Nebraska
- 1921–1922: Clemson
- 1923–1926: Texas
- 1927–1928: Texas Mines

Basketball
- 1907–1908: Mount Union
- 1908–1909: Purdue
- 1909–1912: Allegheny
- 1911–1916: Oregon Agricultural
- 1917–1919: Nebraska
- 1921–1923: Clemson
- 1923–1926: Texas
- 1927–1928: Texas Mines

Baseball
- 1912: Oregon Agricultural
- 1921: Clemson (assistant)

Track and field
- 1921–1923: Clemson

Administrative career (AD unless noted)
- 1916–1919: Nebraska

Head coaching record
- Overall: 79–45–16 (college football); 251–125 (college basketball); 5–9 (college baseball)

Accomplishments and honors

Championships
- Football; 2 MVIAA (1916–1917)

Edward James "Doc" Stewart (January 26, 1877 – November 18, 1929) was an American football, basketball, and baseball player, coach, and college athletics administrator. He was also the founder, and player-coach of the Massillon Tigers professional football team.

== Early life ==
Stewart was the son of a Methodist minister and had played football and basketball at Mount Union College, located in Alliance, Ohio. He had attended medical school at Western Reserve University, located in Cleveland, where he played on the football, basketball, baseball, and track teams, graduating in 1903. Stewart was the first athlete to letter in four sports at Case Western Reserve.

== Massillon Tigers–Canton Bulldogs rivalry ==
In the early 1900s, Stewart organized a pro football team in Massillon, Ohio called the Massillon Tigers. Ed, a young and ambitious editor of the city newspaper The Evening Independent, was named as the team's first coach. At this time, Massillon was involved in a rivalry with the cross-county, Canton Bulldogs. Both teams spent lavish amounts of money to bring in ringers from out of town. Prior to the 1906 season, a news story in The Plain Dealer alleged that the Bulldogs were financially broke and could not pay its players for that final game. Many Canton followers believed the story had originated in Massillon as a trick to discredit their team and make it tougher for Canton to recruit players for 1906. Since Stewart had newspaper connections, he was believed by Canton to have planted the story.

The Tigers had won every "Ohio League" championship from 1902 to 1906. In 1906, Stewart was promoted from coach to the Tigers' manager. Sherburn Wightman, who was coached by Amos Alonzo Stagg, was named the team's new coach.

=== Canton Bulldogs–Massillon Tigers betting scandal ===
In 1906, Stewart was a figure in a betting scandal between the two clubs. The Canton Bulldogs–Massillon Tigers betting scandal was the first major scandal in professional football. It was also the first known case of professional gamblers attempting to fix a professional sport. The scandal began with an allegation made by a Massillon newspaper charging the Bulldogs' coach, Blondy Wallace, and Tigers end, Walter East, with conspiring to fix a two-game championship series between the two clubs. When the Tigers won the second and final game of the series and were named pro football's champions, Wallace was accused of throwing the game for Canton.

Stewart charged, through the Massillon Independent, that an actual attempt was made to bribe some of the Tiger players and that Wallace had been involved.

Stewart never stated that either the first or second Canton-Massillon game was fixed. Instead, his accusation was that an attempt had been made to bribe some Massillion players before the first game. According to Stewart, Tiny Maxwell and Bob Shiring of Massillon had been solicited to throw the first game by East. Maxwell and Shiring then reported the offer to Wightman and the scandal ended before it began. East was then released by the Tigers. Only then was Wallace named by Stewart of being East's accomplice.

The scandal was said to have ruined professional football in Ohio until the mid-1910s. However, some others argue that the expense of placing all-star teams on the field each week also put a damper on the sport. The Canton Morning News put a $20,000 price tag on the Massillon Tigers 1906 team, while many speculate that the Bulldogs roster probably cost even more. Still others contend that the games involving top teams such as Canton and Massilon were too one-sided and lacked excitement. Many towns in Ohio still fielded clubs over the next several years, however these new pros consisted more of sandlotters, with only the occasional ringer. A second incarnation of the Bulldogs would be established in 1911 and later won two championships in the National Football League (NFL).

== College coaching ==
=== Mount Union ===
Stewart's first collegiate head coaching position was as the head football coach at Mount Union College. He coached two seasons there. He posted a 9–2 record in 1907. Stewart was also the head coach of the Mount Union men's basketball team for one season. He coached the team for one season posting a record of 18–3 in the 1907–08 season.

=== Purdue ===
In 1909, Stewart was hired as the head men's basketball coach at Purdue University just days before the season began. He led the team to a record of 8–4, their first winning season in four years.

=== Oregon State ===
From 1911 to 1916, Stewart was the head coach of the men's basketball team at Oregon State, then known as Oregon Agricultural College. In his five seasons as the head basketball coach at OAC, Stewart posted a record of 67–33.

While at Oregon State, he also coached the Oregon State Beavers baseball team during the 1912 season. He coached the team to a 5–9 record.

Pulling the triple threat for Oregon State, Stewart also coached the Oregon State Beavers football team from 1913 to 1915. In football, he compiled a 15–5–5 record.

=== Nebraska ===
From 1916 to 1917, Stewart was the head coach of the Nebraska Cornhuskers football team. In his two seasons at the helm, he led the team to the Missouri Valley Intercollegiate Athletic Association title each year and posted an 11–4 record overall. After the conclusion of the 1917 football season, Stewart took over as head basketball coach and remained in that capacity from 1917 to 1919. He coached the Cornhuskers to a 17–14 record over those two seasons.

=== Clemson ===
In the spring of 1921, Stewart became the head baseball coach at Clemson Agricultural College of South Carolina—now known as Clemson University. That spring was a busy one for Stewart as he also coached the track and field team and ran spring practice for football, all while coaching the baseball team. He coached the baseball team for just the 1921 season and the track program from 1921 to 1923.

In the fall of 1921, Stewart coached his first season of football at Clemson. He remained there for two seasons, the 1921 and 1922 seasons, and compiled a 6–10–2 record.

As soon as the football season of 1921 ended, Stewart jumped into his 4th head coaching role at Clemson at coached the basketball team. He coached the basketball from 1921 to 1923. In his two seasons at the helm, he led Clemson to a 19–19 record.

=== Texas ===
University of Texas athletic director L. Theo Bellmont hired Stewart from Clemson to lead both the Longhorns football and Longhorns basketball programs in 1923.

A medical school graduate, a piano enthusiast, a former sportswriter, a one-time automobile dealership owner, and a veteran coach, E.J. Stewart quickly became a popular figure across diverse segments of the university population. His oratory eloquence landed him an open job offer from the head of the UT English Department, should he ever decide to quit coaching and desire other work.

Some have speculated that Stewart's devotion to his varied non-athletic interests was the root cause of his football and basketball teams' decline in performance over his tenure. He led the Longhorn football team to an 8–0–1 record during the 1923 season; his following teams finished with records of 5–3–1, 6–2–1, and 5–4. Stewart led the Longhorn basketball team to a perfect 23–0 mark and a Southwest Conference championship during the 1923–24 season, but his subsequent teams finished 17–8, 12–10, and 13–9.

This decline in his teams' performance resulted in the popular Stewart's controversial dismissal following the 1926–27 season.

=== Texas Mines ===
Stewart ended his career at the College of Mines and Metallurgy of the University of Texas—now known as the University of Texas at El Paso (UTEP)—where he compiled a 5–6–3 record.

== Death ==
On November 18, 1929, Stewart was shot and killed by a deer-hunting companion. He was interred at Lake View Cemetery in Cleveland.

== Head coaching record ==
=== College football ===
Year	Team	Overall	Conference	Standing	Bowl/playoffs
Mount Union Purple (Independent) (1907)
1907	Mount Union	9–2			
Mount Union:		9–2			
Allegheny Gators (Independent) (1909–1911)
1909	Allegheny	2–4–1			
1910	Allegheny	3–1–1			
1911	Allegheny	4–4–1			
Allegheny:		9–9–3			
Oregon Agricultural Aggies (Northwest Conference) (1913–1915)
1913	Oregon Agricultural	3–2–3	3–1–1	2nd	
1914	Oregon Agricultural	7–0–2	2–0–2	2nd	
1915	Oregon Agricultural	5–3	2–2	4th	
Oregon Agricultural:		15–5–5	7–3–3		
Nebraska Cornhuskers (Missouri Valley Intercollegiate Athletic Association) (1916–1917)
1916	Nebraska	6–2	3–1	1st	
1917	Nebraska	5–2	2–0	1st	
Nebraska:		11–4	5–1		
Clemson Tigers (Southern Intercollegiate Athletic Association) (1921)
1921	Clemson	1–6–2	0–5–2	21st	
Clemson Tigers (Southern Conference) (1922)
1922	Clemson	5–4	1–2	T–11th	
Clemson:		6–10–2	1–7–2		
Texas Longhorns (Southwest Conference) (1923–1926)
1923	Texas	8–0–1	2–0–1	2nd	
1924	Texas	5–3–1	2–3	6th	
1925	Texas	6–2–1	2–1–1	T–2nd	
1926	Texas	5–4	2–2	T–3rd	
Texas:		24–9–3	8–6–2		
Texas Mines Miners (Independent) (1927–1928)
1927	Texas Mines	2–2–2			
1928	Texas Mines	3–4–1			
Texas Mines:		5–6–3			
Total:		79–45–16			
National championship Conference title Conference division title or championship game berth

=== Basketball ===
Record table
Season	Team	Overall	Conference	Standing	Postseason
Mount Union Purple (Independent) (1907–1908)
1907–08	Mount Union	18–3			
Mount Union:		18–3 (.857)			
Purdue Boilermakers (Western Conference) (1908–1909)
1908–09	Purdue	8–4	6–4	2nd	
Purdue:		8–4	6–4		
Allegheny Gators (Independent) (1909–1912)
1909–10	Allegheny				
1910–11	Allegheny				
1911–12	Allegheny				
Allegheny:					
Oregon Agricultural Aggies (Northwest Conference) (1911–1915)
1911–12	Oregon Agricultural				
1912–13	Oregon Agricultural				
1913–14	Oregon Agricultural				
1914–15	Oregon Agricultural				
Oregon Agricultural Aggies (Northwest Conference / Pacific Coast Conference) (1915–1916)
1915–16	Oregon Aggies				
Oregon Aggies:		67–33 (.670)			
Nebraska Cornhuskers (Missouri Valley Conference) (1916–1919)
1916–17	Nebraska	12–10	4–8	5th	
1917–18	Nebraska	7–7	4–5	T–4th	
1918–19	Nebraska	10–6	10–6	3rd	
Nebraska:		29–23 (.558)	18–19 (.486)		
Clemson Tigers (Southern Conference) (1921–1923)
1921–22	Clemson	8–13	0–3	12th	
1922–23	Clemson	11–6	3–3	T-8th	
Clemson:		19–19 (.500)	3–6 (.333)		
Texas Longhorns (Southwest Conference) (1924–1927)
1924	Texas	23–0	20–0	1st	
1924–25	Texas	17–8	9–5	4th	
1925–26	Texas	12–10	6–6	4th	
1926–27	Texas	13–9	7–4	T-2nd	
Texas:		65–27 (.707)	42–15 (.737)		
Texas Mines Miners (Independent) (1927–1928)
1927–28	Texas Mines				
Texas Mines:					
Total:		251–125 (.668)			
National champion Postseason invitational champion Conference regular season champion Conference regular season and conference tournament champion Division regular season champion Division regular season and conference tournament champion Conference tournament champion
