= Franklin Athletic Club of Cleveland =

Defunct football team in Cleveland, Ohio

General information
- Founded: c. 1903
- Folded: 1909
- Headquartered: Cleveland, Ohio, United States
- Colors: Unknown

Team history
- Franklin Athletic Club of Cleveland

League / conference affiliations
- Independent (1903-1909)

The Franklin Athletic Club of Cleveland was a short-lived professional football team based in Cleveland, Ohio from 1903 until around 1909. Franklin played in "Ohio League" against the early Canton Bulldogs, Shelby Blues and Massillon Tigers. In 1904 the Tigers defeated Franklin 56-6.

The team's most notable player was Peggy Parratt, one of the pioneers of the forward pass, who played with Franklin briefly in 1907.
