= Oil City Athletic Club =

Defunct baseball team

General information
- Founded: 1893; 133 years ago
- Folded: 1903; 123 years ago
- Headquartered: Oil City, Pennsylvania, United States
- Colors: Unknown

Team history
- Oil City Athletic Club (1893–1903)

League / conference affiliations
- Western Pennsylvania Circuit

The Oil City Athletic Club was a professional football team based in Oil City, Pennsylvania from 1893 until 1903. The team was the intrastate rival of the Franklin Athletic Club. The team later folded as a result of a series of bidding wars with Franklin over the era's best football players in Pennsylvania in 1903.

== 1902 bidding war ==
Franklin and Oil City had a lot of money tied up in their football teams. In 1902, during the teams' third meeting however, Oil City signed the entire team from the Pittsburgh Athletic Club, seven of the Philadelphia All-Stars, some players from a team located in Steubenville, Ohio and from Grove City College for that one game against Franklin. Since there was a large amount of hometown gambling on football games in 1902, this action resulted in all of the Franklin fans losing their bets to Oil City. However while losing the game, Franklin did manage to hold Oil City's all star team to a 10-0 score.

== 1903 Pre-season ==
To avoid being out bid again by Oil City for football talent, Franklin's manager Dave Printz recruited every star player inside of Pennsylvania to play for Franklin. After the team's loss against Oil City, Prince attended the first National Football League championship game between the Pittsburgh Stars and Philadelphia Athletics. Immediately after the game, Prince signed every important player in sight to Franklin.

After seeing what Prince had done, Oil City forfeited their season due to a lack of players. All of the money that was to be gambled on the 1903 football contests between Franklin and Oil City, sat in a bank escrow account and was later returned to the gamblers.
