= 1905 Canton Athletic Club season =

American football team season

- Head coach: Bill Laub, Blondy Wallace
- Home stadium: Mahaffey Park

Results
- Record: 8–2

The 1905 Canton Athletic Club season was their inaugural season in the Ohio League. The team finished 8–2, giving them second place in the league.

== Schedule ==
Game	Date	Opponent	Result	Record
1	September 30	Lisbon Athletic Club	W 41–0	1–0
2	October 7	Columbus Athletic Club	W 63–0	2–0
3	October 14	U.S.S. Michigan Football Team	W 121–0	3–0
4	October 21	Dayton Athletic Club	W 107–0	4–0
5	October 25	at Akron Athletic Club	W 52–0	5–0
6	October 28	at Shelby Blues	W 25–0	6–0
7	November 4	Benwood (W.Va.) A.C.	W 66–0	7–0
8	November 18	at Latrobe Athletic Association	L 0–6	7–1
9	November 22	Carlisle Indians	W 8–0	8–1
10	November 30	at Massillon Tigers	L 4–14	8–2
