= Peggy Parratt =

American football player and coach (1883–1959)

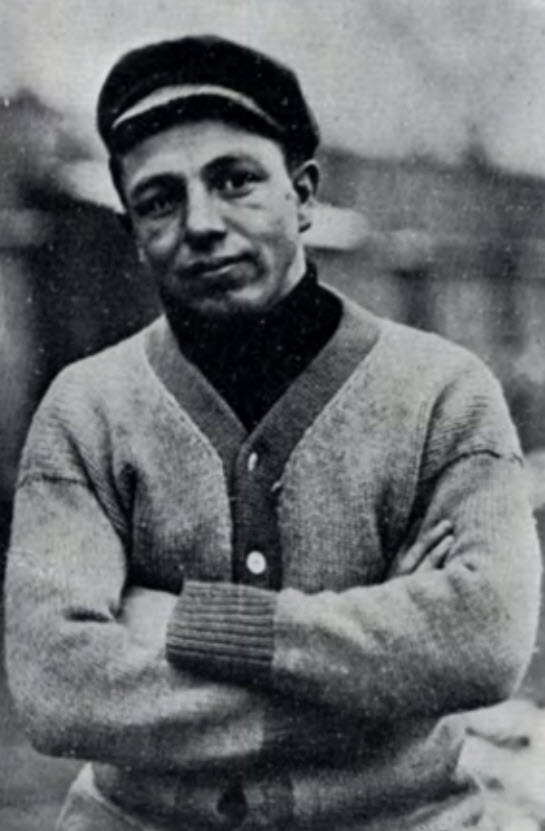
- Peggy Parratt as assistant coach of the 1909 Case football team

Profile
- Position: Quarterback

Personal information
- Born: March 21, 1883; Ontario, Canada
- Died: January 3, 1959 (aged 75); Cleveland, Ohio, U.S.

Career information
- College: Case School of Applied Science

Career history

Playing
- 1905: Shelby Blues
- 1905: Lorain Pros
- 1906: Massillon Tigers
- 1907: All-Massillons
- 1907: Franklin (Ohio) A.C.
- 1908–1911: Shelby Blues
- 1912–1915: Parratt's Indians
- 1916: Cleveland Tigers

Coaching
- 1908–1911: Shelby Blues
- 1912–1914: Parratt's Indians
- 1916: Cleveland Tigers

Operations
- 1925: Cleveland Tigers

Awards and highlights
- 4× Ohio League champion (1906, 1911, 1913, 1914); Threw first-ever legal forward pass in a professional game; Appointed to NFL Rules committee; NFL representative the Intercollegiate Committee of Athletics

George Watson "Peggy" Parratt (March 21, 1883 – January 3, 1959) was a professional football player who played in the "Ohio League" prior to its becoming a part of the National Football League (NFL). Born in Cleveland, Ohio, Parratt played quarterback for the Shelby Blues, Lorain Pros, Massillon Tigers, Massillon All-Stars, Franklin Athletic Club of Cleveland, Akron Indians and the Cleveland Tigers between 1905 and 1916. Parratt threw the first legal forward pass in professional football history while playing for the Massillon Tigers on October 25, 1906.

== College career ==
Parratt played college football at Case School of Applied Science, now known as Case Western Reserve University. During his time at Case, he became a 3-time All-Ohio college star. However, in 1905, he risked his amateur standing by playing professional ball on Sundays for the Shelby Blues. To hide his identity from the media and school officials, Parratt played under the name "Jimmy Murphy" and used a nose guard to conceal his face. However just weeks after his first game for Shelby, the Cleveland newspapers revealed that "Murphy" was really Peggy Parratt, in disguise. Soon afterwards Parratt was called in for questioning by the chairman of the Case University Athletic Board, Professor Arthur S. Wright. During the interview, Parratt openly admitted to breaking the amateur code. He was then barred from all further intercollegiate play at Case. At this time, Parratt was also a star basketball and baseball player for Case and was removed from those teams as well.

By admitting openly to playing for Shelby, Parratt thus became the first college football star to be disciplined by his school for moonlighting as a professional football player. Several other college players had secretly played professional football, but they always denied the charges when questioned. However Case still awarded Peggy his varsity letter, citing his invaluable leadership on and off the field during the major part of the 1905 football season. He also made All-Ohio Honors for 1905 and was allowed to coach the college's baseball team, after being stripped of captaincy due to the scandal. After graduating from Case in 1906, Parratt was offered the head football coaching job at Marietta College, however he turned it down to continue his professional playing career. In 1909, however, Peggy was an assistant football coach at Case, while he was also playing for the Shelby Blues.

== Professional career ==
=== Massillon Tigers ===
After losing his amateur status, Parratt played football for the Lorain Pros for the remainder of the 1905 season. In 1906, Peggy was signed by the Massillon Tigers, in part because of his mastery of the forward pass. He immediately earned the role of starting quarterback. The first forward pass in a professional football game may have been thrown by Parratt on October 25, 1906 to Dan "Bullet" Riley in a victory over a combined Benwood-Moundsville team, according to Robert W. Peterson in his book Pigskin The Early Years of Pro Football. Parratt though did not receive initial recognition for the pass since Eddie Wood of the Canton Bulldogs and Latrobe Athletic Association was erroneously credited for catching the first forward pass in pro football by Harry March in his book Pro Football: Its Ups and Downs. During the second game of the 1906 Ohio League championship, which would later result in a betting scandal on November 24, 1906, Wood reportedly caught a couple of the new forward passes. March somehow stated that those catches in a championship game, at the end of the season, were very first catches in professional football. It was later discovered that Parratt threw an earlier recorded pass to Bullet Riley on October 25, for professional football's first forward pass. A second recorded pass was thrown to Clark Schrontz two days later.

During the Tigers season-ending series with the Canton Bulldogs, to determine the Ohio League champions, Parratt caught two interceptions while the Tigers won the series second, and deciding game. However rumors of a betting fix tainted the championship and turned the public off to pro football in Ohio for the next several years. Many of the top players of the day left Ohio when the scandal broke. This left only the local sandlotters to pick up the pieces and try to patch together a respectable season for 1907. Since Parratt was not a part of the scandal, he continued to play for Massillon, now renamed the "Massillon All-Stars" for 1907, however he soon learned that he could make more money playing with the Franklin Athletic Club, which was untouched by the fallout over the betting scandal the year before.

=== Franklin Athletic Club ===
During his year with the Franklin A.C., Parratt played in only a few games. He spent the majority of his time, officiating professional football games in the Cleveland-area.

=== Shelby Blues ===
Sometime before the 1908 season, Parratt returned to the Shelby Blues, the place where he made his professional debut in 1905. He became the owner of the franchise by helping to organize and financially back the team. He also became a player-coach for the Blues and helped the team recruit players. In his first year with the Blues, the team defeated all of their rivals and finished in a tie with the Akron Indians for state honors. However, in 1909, the Indians defeated the Blues 13–9 and claimed the championship.

For the 1910 season, Parratt decided to recruit heavily to put together a contender in Shelby. As a result, Peggy signed several well-known Ohio college graduates and combined them with the best local veteran players he could find. The plan worked and Shelby upset the Indians twice, 16–6 and 8–5, and the Blues claimed the 1910 Ohio title.

==== 1911 Ohio League title forfeit ====
Parratt used the same plan for the upcoming 1911 season and once again Shelby defeated Akron twice, 6–0 and 3–0. The 1911 title game was then to be between the Blues and the revived Canton Bulldogs, then referred to as the Canton Professionals. The Blues won the game when Canton forfeited the title game to Shelby, after a heated dispute over an offside ruling. According to reports, Parratt was willing to compromise with Canton over the official's call, however Canton captain Harry Turner was so upset that he called his team off the field and refused to continue the game. Immediately after the game, Turner vowed to give up football because of the call. However Turner wanted so badly to beat Parratt that he returned to play for Canton for the next three years.

=== Akron Indians ===
Before the 1912 season, Parratt left Shelby for Akron. He took the move realizing that he could make more money in the larger football market that Akron could provide. When he arrived in Akron, his first move was to change the team name from the "Akron" Indians to "Parratt's" Indians. With Peggy as player, coach, and owner-manager, the Indians split their series with Shelby and twice defeated Canton, 14–7 and 19–7. However, they were defeated by the unheard of Elyria Athletics, who then took the Ohio championship. The Athletics were mostly former Blues players who formed a team in Elyria after Parratt left for Akron.

The following season, Peggy brought most of Elyria's 1912 championship team to Akron, and adding them to his roster. The Indians then beat Shelby and Elyria. They also managed to tie the rapidly improving Canton Pros. During Indians championship game against Shelby, the Blues loaded their team with a collection of famous players from big Eastern schools and supported each member with a payroll of $700 for just that one game. However, the game was cancelled due to snowstorm. A week later when the Blues returned to Akron, the Indians were prepared with newly recruited talent that was viewed as even superior to that of Shelbys. The Indians won the game 20–0 and brought the Ohio title back to Akron.

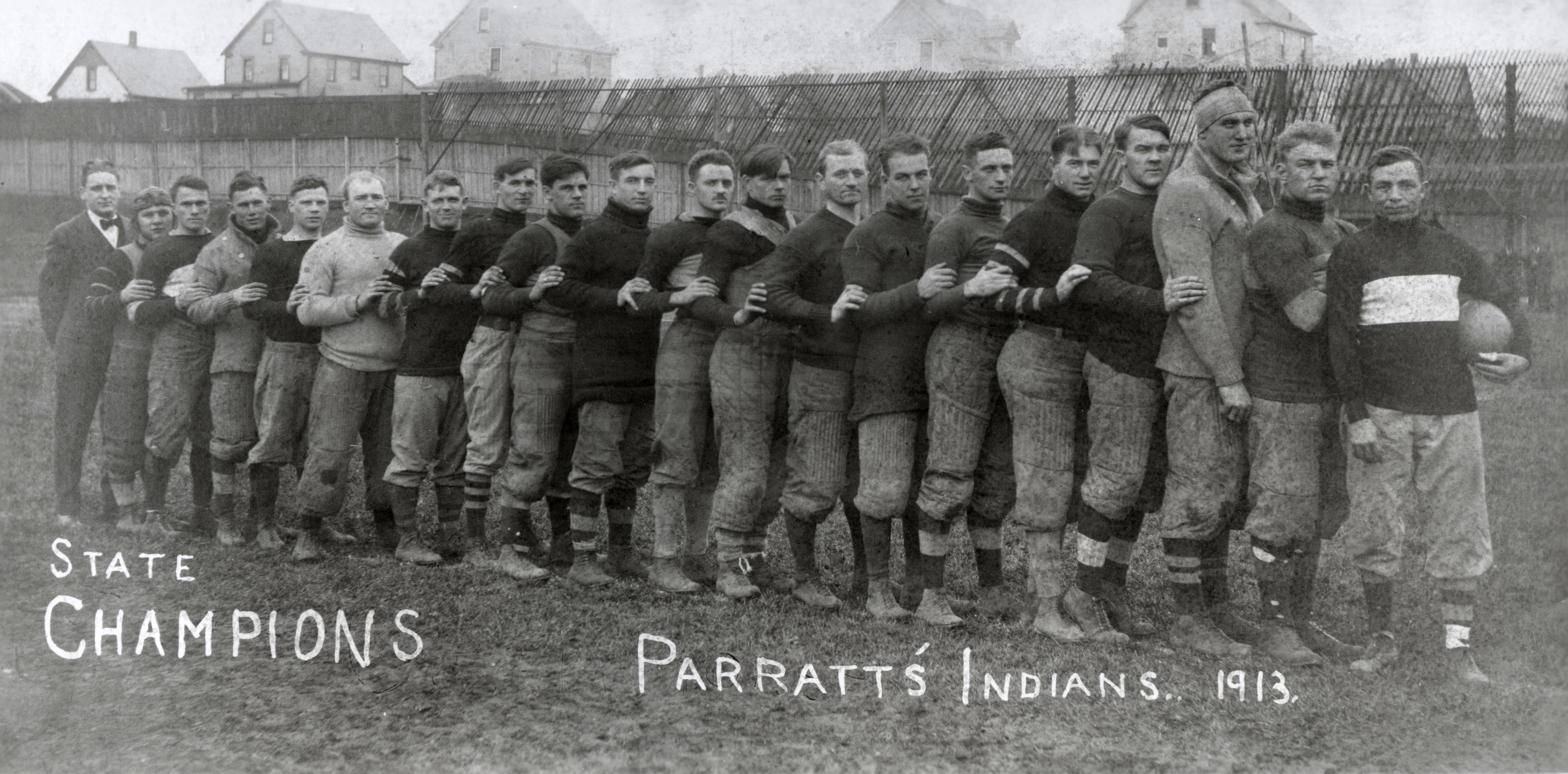
1913 Akron Parratt Indians

==== The death of Harry Turner ====
For his 1914 recruiting efforts, Parratt signed the usual big names players, which consisted of a lineup that changed from week to week, with just enough stars on hand to guarantee a win. However, in 1914, he also employed several former Notre Dame stars, including the legendary Knute Rockne, Howard "Horse" Edwards, "Deke" Jones, and Joe Collins. As well as several Ohio collegiate stars like Ed Kagy, Dwight Wertz, Homer Davidson, Dutch Powell, Frank Nesser and Ralph "Fat" Waldsmith. By late season, the entire left side of his Akron Indian line was from Notre Dame. The team dominated the Ohio League for the season, however they managed to lose to Canton 6–0 on November 15, 1914. That game was memorable not because of Canton's win, but because Harry Turner, who had fostered a need to beat Parratt at football, died when his spine broke during a tackle on Akron's fullback, Joe Collins. Turner's death marked the first fatal accident involving a major professional football team in Ohio. According to Canton manager Jack Cusack, Turner on his deathbed whispered, "I know I must go, but I'm satisfied, for we beat Peggy Parratt!" A week later Akron defeated a mourning Canton team 21–0 to claim the 1914 title.

=== Cleveland Tigers ===
To avoid an Akron title in 1915 the owners of the Massillon Tigers raided Parratt's Akron roster and took away many of his star players. Canton manager, Jack Cusack, also picked up some former Akron players and signed Jim Thorpe to his renamed Canton Bulldogs team. By the end of the season, Parratt's team was made up mostly of Akron sandlotters.

After the disastrous 1915 season, Parratt returned to Cleveland, where he took some of his former Akron players and a few ex-collegians into a respectable team which he named the Cleveland Tigers. The 1916 Tigers compiled a winning record despite falling to the Bulldogs and splitting a two-game series with the Columbus Panhandles. Parratt played his last professional football game on October 22, 1916, as his Tigers lost to Columbus 9–6.

== Formation of the NFL ==
After his retirement from football, Parratt's name was always brought up when anyone tried to establish a concrete football league. Peggy was not part of the 1920 meetings set-up by Ralph Hay which saw the birth of the National Football League. He did reappear on the football scene on August 1, 1925, in Chicago, representing Cleveland Tigers owner Samuel Deutsch. A few months later on February 6, 1926, Parratt was appointed to two of the NFL's most important committees. The first committee consisted of a seven-member panel that was charged with redrafting the NFL constitution and by-laws. The second committee was a three-man committee to meet with the Intercollegiate Committee of Athletics (ICA) in New York City. The other two members of this panel were George Halas and Dr. Harry March.

== Bridge player ==
After his football-playing days, he achieved some notability at tournaments in the later days of auction and the early days of contract bridge.

== Death ==
Parratt died on January 3, 1959, and was interred at Lake View Cemetery in Cleveland.
