= 1907 All-Massillons season =

American football team season

- Head coach: Sherburn Wightman
- Home stadium: Hospital Grounds Stadium

Results
- Record: 7–0–1
- League place: 1st (Ohio League)

The 1907 All-Massillons football season was their fifth season in existence. The team was the 1907 incarnation of Massillon Tigers and finished with a record of 7–0–1 and won their fifth Ohio League championship in as many years.

== Schedule ==
| Game | Date | Opponent | Result |
|---|---|---|---|
| 1 | September 29, 1907 | Alliance, Ohio | W |
| 2 | October 6, 1907 | Akron, Ohio | W |
| 3 | October 13, 1907 | Salem, Ohio | W |
| 4 | October 20, 1907 | Broadway Athletic Club of Cleveland | W 11–5 |
| 5 | November 10, 1907 | at Shelby Blues | T 0–0 |
| 6 | November 17, 1907 | at Columbus Panhandles | W 6–4 |
| 7 | November 24, 1907 | Akros | W |
| 8 | November 29, 1907 | Columbus Panhandles | W 13–4 |
