= Clark Schrontz =

American football player and coach

Profile
- Position: End

Career information
- College: Washington & Jefferson

Career history
- 1902: Pittsburgh Stars
- 1903: Franklin Athletic Club
- 1904–1905: Massillon Tigers
- 1906: Canton Bulldogs

Awards and highlights
- NFL champion (1902); "World Football champion" (1903); Football World Series champion (1903); 2× Ohio League champion (1904, 1905)

Clark A. Schrontz was an American professional football player. In 1902 he won a championship in the first National Football League (NFL) with the Pittsburgh Stars. A year later he was a member of the Franklin Athletic Club football team that was considered the "best in the world". He also won the 1903 World Series of Football, held at Madison Square Garden, with the Franklin Athletic Club.

Schrontz then spent the next several seasons with the Massillon Tigers of the Ohio League. In 1905 the Tigers promoted him to the position of "field captain". In 1906, he was convinced by Blondy Wallace, coach of the Canton Bulldogs to join the Bulldogs. That season Canton played Massillon in a two-game home-and-home series to determine the 1906 Ohio League championship. While Canton won the first game of the series, Massillon won the second game (and under rules determined by both team) the championship. Canton was later accused of throwing the championship in a betting scandal.

Prior to his professional career, Schrontz played three years at end while attending Washington & Jefferson College. He had a reputation as being one of the fastest men to get down the field during a punt. The football team adopted a poodle as their mascot, naming it "Schrontzie" in Clark's honor.

In 1904, Schrontz coached the football team at Bethany College in Bethany, West Virginia. In 1907, he assisted fellow Washington & Jefferson alumnus William B. Seaman in coaching the football team at Western Reserve University, which later merged into Case Western Reserve University. Schrontz returned to Washington & Jefferson to assist Bob Folwell in coaching the football team in 1913 and 1914.

== Head coaching record ==
Year	Team	Overall	Conference	Standing	Bowl/playoffs
Bethany Bison (Independent) (1904)
1904	Bethany	3–4–2			
Bethany:		3–4–2			
Total:		3–4–2			
