= 1911 Canton Professionals season =

American football team season

- Head coach: Ben Clarke
- Home stadium: Whitacre Field, League Field

Results
- Record: 8–1

The 1911 Canton Professionals season was their third season in the Ohio League, and their first since 1906. The team finished 8–1.

== Schedule ==
Game	Date	Opponent	Result	Record
1	September 24	Akron East End Tigers	W 6–0	1–0
2	October 1	Hinkle All-Stars	W 2–0	2–0
3	October 8	Akron Crescents	W 39–0	3–0
4	October 15	Alliance Athletic Club	W 19–0	4–0
5	October 22	Akron Tigers	W 30–0	5–0
6	October 29	Cleveland Neagles	W 33–0	6–0
7	November 5	Canton Indians	W 52–0	7–0
8	November 12	Massillon Tigers	W 47–0	8–0
9	November 17	Shelby Blues	L 0–1	8–1
