= 1904 Massillon Tigers season =

American football team season

- Head coach: E.J. Stewart
- Home stadium: Hospital Grounds Stadium

Results
- Record: 7–0
- League place: 1st (Ohio League)

The 1904 Massillon Tigers football season was their second season in existence. The team finished with a record of 7–0 and won their second Ohio League championship in as many years.

== Schedule ==
Game	Date	Opponent	Result
1	September 24, 1904	Canal Dover Giants	W 57–0
2	October 8, 1904	Franklin Athletic Club of Cleveland	W 56–6
3	October 15, 1904	Marion, Ohio	W 148–0
4	October 22, 1904	Pittsburgh Lyceum	W 44–0
5	November 5, 1904	Shelby Athletic Club	W 28–0
6	November 12, 1904	Sharon Buhl Club	W 63–0
7	November 24, 1904	Akron East Ends	W 6–5
