= Harry March =

American football historian and promoter (1875–1940)

Profile
- Positions: President, Secretary, Physician, Coach

Personal information
- Born: December 11, 1875; New Franklin, Ohio, U.S.
- Died: June 10, 1940 (aged 64); Canton, Ohio, U.S.

Career information
- High school: Canton McKinley
- College: Mount Union, George Washington

Career history

Playing
- 1893: Mount Union Purple Raiders

Coaching
- 1904: Canton McKinley High School

Operations
- 1925–1928: New York Giants (Secretary)
- 1928–1933: New York Giants (President)
- 1936: American Football League (President)

team physician
- 1906: Canton Bulldogs

Awards and highlights
- Co-founder of the New York Giants; Authored Pro Football: Its Ups and Downs; Intercollegiate Committee of Athletics rep (1926)

Other information
- Military career
- Allegiance: United States
- Branch: U.S. Army
- Service years: 1917–1919
- Rank: Second lieutenant
- Unit: Medical Corps
- Conflicts: World War I

Harry Addison March (December 11, 1875 – June 10, 1940) was an early football historian and promoter, as well as a medical doctor. He also helped organize the National Football League (NFL) and well as the second American Football League (AFL). March is also credited with convincing Tim Mara to purchase an NFL franchise for New York City, which is still in existence today as the New York Giants. He wrote one of the first books on the history of the professional game: Pro Football: Its Ups and Downs in 1934. Dr. March is known as the "Father of Professional Football."

== Biography ==
=== Early life ===
March was born in New Franklin, Ohio, on December 11, 1875, and grew up in Canton. His father, Henry Clay March, was an officer in the U.S. Army and a close friend to future President William McKinley. Harry played college football at Mount Union College in 1893 and later became a reporter for the Canton Repository. When McKinley campaigned for the Presidency in 1896, March joined him as a reporter and followed his campaign. The job led Harry to Washington, D.C., where he landed a job earning $7-a-week as an assistant to drama critic Channing Pollock. When McKinley advised him that newspaper reporters were "lounge lizards", he studied medicine at Columbian College (now George Washington University) Medical School and went back to Canton to start a practice.

=== Pro football ===
While in Canton, March played in or watched hundreds of football games featuring the best professionals of the day such as Christy Mathewson, Fielding Yost, Walter Okeson, Knute Rockne and Pudge Heffelfinger. These experiences would inspire and help him to write Pro Football:It's Ups and Downs in 1934.

In 1904, March was a coach for the Canton McKinley High School football team. By 1906, March was practicing medicine in Canton and was even one of the team doctors to the Canton Bulldogs of the pre-NFL "Ohio League". March would treated the players for shin splints and muscle pulls. Since he was Canton's team doctor in 1906, March was witness to the events surrounding the Canton Bulldogs–Massillon Tigers betting scandal. He recorded his interpretation of the event in his book Pro Football: Its Ups and Downs, over a quarter-century later. However his version of the scandal has been questioned for accuracy by the Professional Football Researchers Association in 1984, with their article "Blondy Wallace and Biggest Football Scandal Ever".

From 1925 to 1928 he served as Secretary of the New York Football Giants and from 1928 to 1933 he served as president of the club. In 1926 he was selected to a three-man committee to meet with the Intercollegiate Committee of Athletics in New York City. The other two members of this panel were George Halas and Peggy Parratt.

A squabble with George Preston Marshall, owner of the Boston Redskins, put him out of the National Football League in 1934. March sold his interest in the Giants and helped form the second American Football League. March served as president of the new AFL for one year before resigning over differences with the management of several member teams.

March's book Pro Football: Its Ups and Downs, published in 1934, stamped him as the leading historian of American professional football history for the next several decades.

=== Military service ===
March served in the Spanish–American War as a correspondent and in World War I as a lieutenant in the medical corps.

=== Death ===
March died in Canton on June 10, 1940, at the age of 64.

== See also ==
- Pro Football: Its Ups and Downs

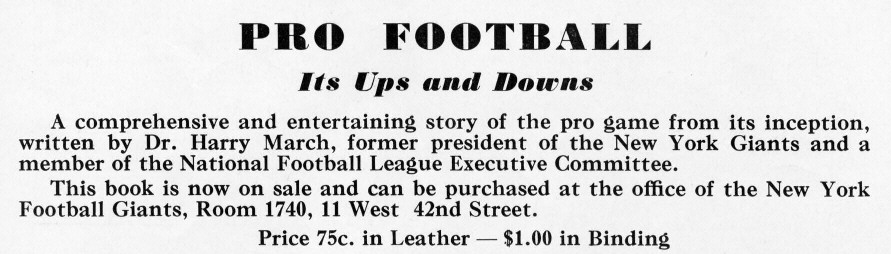
Advertisement for Pro Football, Its Ups and Downs, 1934
