= 1905 Massillon Tigers season =

American football team season

- Head coach: E.J. Stewart
- Home stadium: Hospital Grounds Stadium

Results
- Record: 9–0
- League place: 1st (Ohio League)

The 1905 Massillon Tigers football season was their third season in existence. The team finished with a record of 9–0 and won their third Ohio League championship in as many years.

== Schedule ==
Game	Date	Opponent	Result
1	October 7, 1905	"Ohio Medical University"	W 34–0
2	October 14, 1905	Norwalk, Ohio	W 42–0
3	October 21, 1905	Shelby Athletic Club	W 22–0
4	October 28, 1905	Lorain, Ohio	W 51–0
5	November 2, 1905	Broadway Athletic Club of Cleveland	W 88–0
6	November 9, 1905	Toledo Athletic Association	W 40–0
7	November 16, 1905	Carlisle Indian School	W 8–4
8	November 23, 1905	Canal Dover Giants	W 39–0
9	November 30, 1905	Canton Athletic Club	W 14–4
