= Franklin Athletic Club =

Early professional American football team

General information
- Founded: 1890
- Folded: 1903
- Headquartered: Franklin, Pennsylvania, U.S.
- Colors: Unknown

Personnel
- General manager: Dave Printz

Team history
- Franklin Athletic Club (1890–1903)

League / conference affiliations
- Independent (1890–1904)

Championships
- League championships: 1; 1903 World Series of Football

The Franklin Athletic Club was an early professional football team based in Franklin, Pennsylvania. It was considered the top team in professional football in 1903, by becoming the US Football Champions and winning the 1903 World Series of Football, held after the 1903 season, at New York's Madison Square Garden. The team was also the rivals to the nearby Oil City Athletic Club.

== 1902 bidding war ==
Franklin and Oil City, Pennsylvania had a lot of money tied up in their football teams. In 1902, during the teams' third meeting however, Oil City signed the entire team from Pittsburgh's East End Athletic Association, seven of the Philadelphia All-Stars, some players from a team located in Steubenville, Ohio and from Grove City College for that one game against Franklin. Since there was a large amount of hometown gambling on football games in 1902, this action resulted in all of the Franklin fans losing their bets to Oil City. However while losing the game, Franklin did manage to hold Oil City's all star team to a 10–0 score.

== 1903 pre-season ==
To avoid being out bid again by Oil City for football talent, Franklin's manager Dave Printz recruited an every star player inside of Pennsylvania to play for Franklin. After the team's loss against Oil City, Printz attended the first National Football League championship game between the Pittsburgh Stars and Philadelphia Athletics. Immediately after the game, Printz signed every important player in sight to Franklin.

After seeing what Printz had done, Oil City forfeited their season due to a lack of players. All of the money that was to be gambled on the 1903 football contests between Franklin and Oil City, sat in a bank escrow account and was later returned to the gamblers.

== 1903 season ==
With every major football star under contract with Franklin, Printz decided to open up a challenge to every major professional football club in Pennsylvania. Many stars from the first NFL played for Franklin including Blondy Wallace and Eddie Wood who later became one of the first players to catch forward passes when they became legal in 1906. The team marched its way to a 10–0 record. Franklin then defeated the East End Athletic Association (of Pittsburgh), which consisted of the ringers that defeated them the year before, 23–0.

The Franklin team played all of their games in 1903 (except the final two at Madison Square Garden) at home at Franklin's Athletic Park. The field no longer exists which has many asking where was it located. In a newspaper bonus book titled “Fifty Years of the Baseball War Between Franklin and Oil City,” an article states that in 1902, a baseball advocate named General John A. Wiley and newspaperman William R. Smith secured a suitable spot to build Franklin’s Athletic Park a dual purpose field that was fenced in and had grandstands. The parcel of land they bought was on Liberty St, at the corner of 1st St., and ran from Liberty to Elk. They purchased the land from the James Bleakely Estate (500 feet of ground) and from George Allen (another 100 feet). After it was fenced in, the parcel was 320 feet wide x 610 feet long. After the fence and bleachers were erected, a ticket booth and dressing rooms were built on site.

=== 1903 World Series of Football ===
After defeating the Syracuse Athletic Club, the winners of the 1902 World Series of Football, 12–0. Franklin entered the 1903 Series to be held at Madison Square Garden. The walked away with the Series Championship after defeating the Watertown Red & Black 12–0. However, after winning the Championship, Printz announced that Franklin would not field an all-star squad in 1904.
