= 1903 Franklin Athletic Club season =

American football team season

- Head coach: Teck Matthews

Results
- Record: 12–0
- Division place: No divisions
- Playoffs: No playoffs

The 1903 Franklin Athletic Club football season was their third and final season in existence. The team finished with a record of 12–0. The team was named the top football team in the United States. Franklin went on to win the 1903 World Series of Football, held in December, at Madison Square Garden and did not give up a score all season.

== Schedule ==
| Game | Date | Opponent | Result |
|---|---|---|---|
| 1 | October 21 | Youngstown Athletic Club | W 74–0 |
| 2 | October 24 | Primrose Athletic Club | W 28–0 |
| 3 | October 28 | Jamestown, New York | W 46–0 |
| 4 | October 31 | Wheeling, West Virginia | W 56–0 |
| 5 | November 7 | Ellwood City, Pennsylvania | W 33–0 |
| 6 | November 11 | Buffalo Niagaras | W 74–0 |
| 7 | November 14 | Sewickley, Pennsylvania | W 45–0 |
| 8 | November 18 | Syracuse Athletic Club | W 12–0 |
| 9 | November 21 | Allegheny College | W 47–0 |
| 10 | November 26 | East End Athletic Association | W 23–0 |
| 11 | December 15 | Orange Athletic Club | W 12–0 |
| 12 | December 17 | Watertown Red & Black | W 12–0 |
