= Blondy Wallace =

American football player and coach (died 1937)

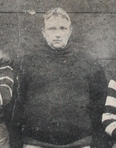
- Wallace pictured in the 1906 Canton football photo

Profile
- Position: Tackle

Personal information
- Died: March 5, 1937 (aged 57); Egg Harbor, New Jersey, U.S.
- Listed weight: 240 lb (109 kg)

Career information
- College: University of Pennsylvania

Career history

Playing
- 1901: Philadelphia Athletic Club
- 1902: Philadelphia Athletics
- 1902: "New York"
- 1902: Syracuse Athletic Club
- 1903: Franklin Athletic Club
- 1905: Canton Athletic Club
- 1906: Canton Bulldogs

Coaching
- 1901: Philadelphia Athletic Club
- 1902: Philadelphia Athletics
- 1905: Canton Athletic Club
- 1906: Canton Bulldogs

Awards and highlights
- 2× Second-team All-American (1899, 1900); 2x New Jersey state champion (1896, 1897); "U.S. Pro Football Title" (1903); Played in First Pro Football Night Game; Played in First Indoor Pro Football Game; 2x World Series of Football winner; Accused of fixing the 1906 Ohio championship; Overall coaching record: 25-6-2

Charles Edgar "Blondy" Wallace (died March 5, 1937) was an early professional football player and later convicted criminal during the Prohibition Era. He was a 240-pound, former Walter Camp second-team All-American tackle from the University of Pennsylvania. He also played two years at Peddie Institute, in New Jersey, winning state championships in 1896 and 1897. During his professional playing career he was involved in almost every major event in professional football between 1902 and 1907. Over that timespan he played for the independent Philadelphia Athletic Club, the Philadelphia Athletics of the first National Football League, the "New York" team and the Syracuse Athletic Club in the 1902 World Series of Football, the Franklin Athletic Club and the Canton Bulldogs of the Ohio League. In 2022, he was named one of the 10 inaugural members for the Football Learning Academy's Hall of Honor, which looks to acknowledge deserving icons that are not currently inducted in the Pro Football Hall of Fame.

== Football career ==
=== 1902 NFL season ===
In 1902, Col. John Rogers, owner of the National League's Philadelphia Phillies, decided to bankroll the Philadelphia Athletic Club football team. Upon hearing of this, Wallace approached Ben Shibe of the rival American League's Philadelphia Athletics to see whether the Athletics would be following suit and fielding a football team. Not wanting his rivals to be unchallenged, Shibe decided to form a team with Wallace as the team's player-coach. The Athletics baseball manager, Connie Mack, was then named the team's manager. The football Philadelphia Athletics finished the 1902 NFL season with a 5–2–2 record for a controversial second-place finish behind the Pittsburgh Stars. The league then folded immediately after the season.

=== 1902 World Series of Football ===
After the NFL season, Wallace played in the World Series of Football in 1902 at Madison Square Garden. He played on a team that consisted of former players from the football Athletics and the football Philadelphia Phillies of the NFL. The name of their team was simply called the "New York" team by Series organizer, Tom O'Rourke, expected to give his patrons the pleasure of watching a "home team" win. Syracuse defeated Wallace and the "New York" club in what has been called the first indoor pro football game. However Blondy would get a second chance winning the series after Glenn "Pop" Warner of the Syracuse Athletic Club suffered a head injury and was replaced by Wallace. Syracuse would go on to win the series championship by a score of 36–0.

=== Franklin Athletic Club ===
In 1903, Dave Printz, the manager of the Franklin Athletic Club, loaded his team with every star football player available. That year, Wallace became the team's captain. That year Franklin posted a 12–0 record and won the 1903 World Series of Football. This accomplishment makes Blondy a winner on both the 1902 and 1903 World Series teams.

=== Canton Bulldogs ===
In 1905, Wallace became the second coach of the Canton Athletic Club (renamed the Canton Bulldogs in 1906). That year Wallace, signed an agreement with the Latrobe Athletic Association, led by quarterback John Brallier, to play against Canton in Latrobe. Latrobe, under Brallier, was not only the current Pennsylvania football champion, but were undefeated for the last three seasons. They were also considered the only professional team capable of competing at the same level as Canton and the Massillon Tigers. Canton would go on to lose the game to Latrobe, however the team was the runner-up in the Ohio League standings for the 1905 season.

Wallace added four former Massillon players to his team in 1906. That year the Bulldogs was able to win their first game against Massillon, during a 2-game home-and-home series at Canton, however they lost the second game at Massillon, and the Tigers again claimed the Ohio championship. Shortly afterward that second game, a Massillon newspaper charged Wallace with fixing the 1906 championship game. The Bulldogs and Wallace denied the charges, maintaining that Massillon only wanted to ruin the club's reputation before their final game against Latrobe. Wallace later filed a libel lawsuit against the Massillon paper. However, Wallace was in need of money, and the case was reportedly settled out of court.

== Referee ==
Wallace also held the job of referee. In 1904, he served as a Head Linesman for a game between Lafayette College and Swarthmore College. Lafayette would go on to win the game 4–0.

== Bootlegger ==
Wallace later became a bootlegger in Atlantic City. Harry March his 1934 a book titled Pro Football: Its Ups and Downs, which documented the Canton-Massillon betting scandal, called Wallace "The King of the Bootleggers". In 1933 he was convicted of evading income tax payments and sentenced to one year in a federal penitentiary. He was formally accused of evading payment to the government of $4,196.72 in 1929 and $1,953.52 in 1930. He was indicted when books and records from the Egg Harbor Brewery which disclosed, according to the government, income tax evasions in 1929 and 1930.

== Death ==
Wallace died on March 5, 1937, while he was rushed by ambulance to a hospital in Atlantic City. He had suffered from liver problems.
