= Canton Bulldogs =

Defunct American football team

General information
- Founded: 1903
- Folded: 1927
- Stadium: League Field (capacity 8,000)
- Headquartered: Canton, Ohio, United States
- Colors: Maroon, white

Personnel
- Head coach: Bill Laub (1905); Blondy Wallace (1905–1906); Ben Clarke (1911); Harry Blythe (1912); Harry Hazlett (1913–1915); Jim Thorpe (1915–1920); Cap Edwards (1921); Guy Chamberlin (1922–1923); Harry Robb (1925–1926); Pete Henry (1926)

Team history
- Canton Athletic Club (1904–1906); Cleveland Bulldogs (1924); Canton Bulldogs (1906–1923, 1925–1927)

League / conference affiliations
- Ohio League (1903–1906, 1911–1919); National Football League (1920–1927)

The Canton Bulldogs were a professional American football team, based in Canton, Ohio. They played in the Ohio League from 1903 to 1906 and 1911 to 1919, and the American Professional Football Association (later renamed the National Football League (NFL) in 1922), from 1920 to 1923, and again from 1925 to 1926. The Bulldogs won the 1916, 1917, and 1919 Ohio League championships. They were the NFL champions in 1922 and 1923. In 1921–1923, the Bulldogs played 25 straight games without a defeat (including 3 ties). This remained an NFL record, until the NFL recognized the records of the All-America Football Conference in 2025.

As a result of the Bulldogs' early success, along with the league being founded in the city, the Pro Football Hall of Fame is located in Canton. Jim Thorpe (Sac and Fox), an Olympic champion and renowned all-around athlete, was Canton's most-recognized player in the pre-NFL era.

In 1924, Sam Deutsch, the owner of the NFL's Cleveland Indians, bought the Canton Bulldogs. He took the Bulldogs name and its players to Cleveland and named his franchise the Cleveland Bulldogs. He offered to sell the Canton franchise back to the city of Canton to play in the 1924 season; however, there were no buyers interested in the team. He "mothballed" the Canton club. The Canton Bulldogs were re-established in 1925, and the NFL considers the 1925 to 1926 Canton Bulldogs to be the same team as the 1920 to 1923 incarnation.

An unrelated "Canton Bulldogs" team played in the United Football League in 1964. This team's name was coincidental, as it had moved from Cleveland and kept its original nickname. That team moved to Philadelphia, where it became the "Philadelphia Bulldogs". All in all, this version of the Cleveland-Canton-Philadelphia Bulldogs played from 1961 to 1966, its last two years in Philadelphia as a member of the Continental Football League. Another "Canton Bulldogs" team was slated to begin play in the Stars Football League in 2012, although that team was never organized. The Bulldogs name is also in use at Canton McKinley High School.

== History ==
=== Origin ===
Prior to the debut of professional football in the city, an amateur team from Canton was mentioned as being a superior team in Stark County, Ohio. Until about 1902, this team competed with the Akron East Ends for the Ohio Independent Championship. When the Massillon Tigers arrived on the scene and went professional, Canton, as an amateur team, was no longer competitive. The Canton Bulldogs were officially established on November 15, 1904, as the Canton Athletic Club, a club designed to operate baseball and football teams. The statement stated that the football team was to be a "professional organization", complete with a "professional coach".

=== Blondy Wallace era ===
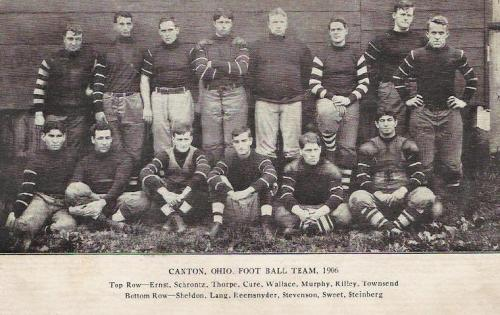
The 1906 Canton Bulldogs team.

The team was given the goal of beating the rival Massillon Tigers, who had won the Ohio League championship in 1903 and 1904. To do this, Canton went out and offered money to the best players on all the other Ohio League teams. Bill Laub, a player, team captain, and coach of the Akron East Ends, was hired as the team's first-ever coach.

The team began its 1905 season with a 7–0 record. The Bulldogs then traveled to Latrobe, Pennsylvania to play the Latrobe Athletic Association, led by quarterback John Brallier. Latrobe was not only the current Pennsylvania champions but had gone undefeated for the last three seasons. Latrobe was also considered the only pro team capable of competing with Canton and Massillon. Canton would go on to lose its 1905 game to Latrobe, 6–0. However, the worst part of the loss came when coach Bill Laub became injured and was unable to finish the season. Blondy Wallace, a former All-American for the Penn Quakers, was then named as Laub's successor and team captain. Two weeks later, the team would lose the Ohio League championship game to the Massillon Tigers, 14–4.

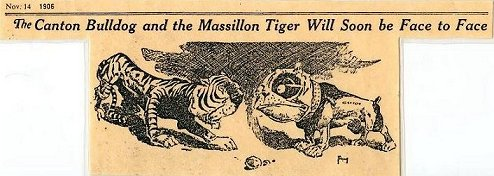
Massillon Tiger vs. Canton Bulldog

Sometime during the 1906 season, the Canton team became known as the "Bulldogs" although no one is quite sure how it came to be affixed to the Canton team. It wasn't called that in 1905, nor through most of the 1906 season. As late as November 4, R.C. Johnson, an editorial cartoonist with the Canton Repository, was only able to picture the Canton team as only a man with a club lying in wait for the Massillon Tiger. Most references to the team called it "Canton A.C.", "C.A.C.", "Canton eleven". "The Red and White" or "Wallace's Men". Suddenly, almost overnight, the team became the "Bulldogs", with a November 14, 1906 cartoon showing the Canton Bulldog facing off against the Massillon Tiger.

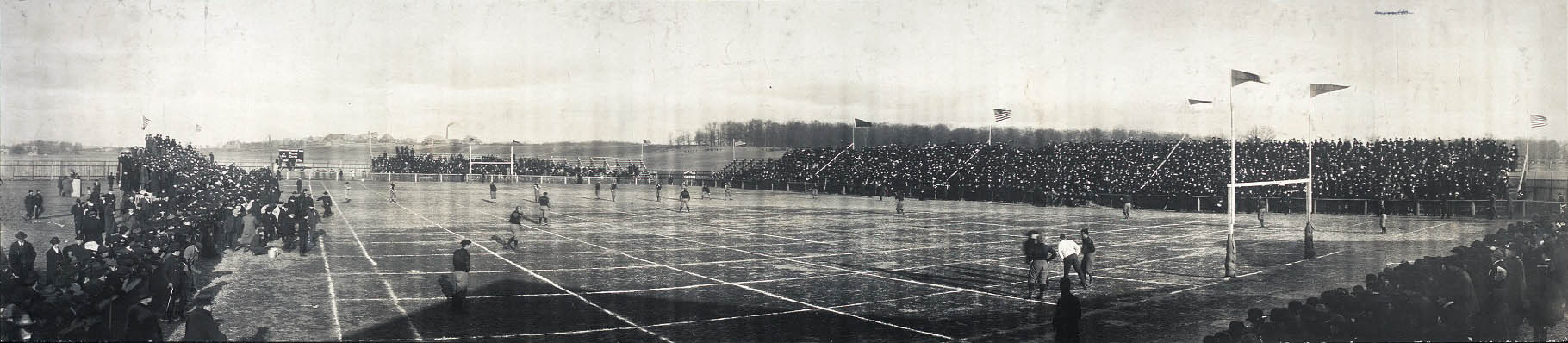
Canton Bulldogs vs. Massillon Tigers playing on grid field on November 24, 1906, during the betting scandal.

Blondy Wallace began the 1906 season by signing Jack Lang, Jack Hayden, Herman Kerkhoff, and Clark Schrontz away from the Tigers and improving Canton's chances for 1906 championship. Due to the money that was being spent by Canton and Massillon on professional players, both teams ended up with a spending deficit that had to be shouldered by local businessmen.

That year the Bulldogs won their first game against the Tigers, at Canton, but lost the second game at Massillon. Due to the rules of the championship series, the win in the second game allowed Massillon to claim the Ohio championship. Shortly after that second game, a Massillon newspaper charged Canton coach Blondy Wallace with throwing the 1906 championship game. Canton denied the charges, maintaining that Massillon only wanted to ruin the club's reputation before their final game with Latrobe. Although Massillon could not prove that Canton had thrown the game, the accusation so tarnished Canton's name that virtually no one attended the Latrobe game. The scandal ruined professional football in Ohio until the mid-1910s. Other sports pundits argue that the expense of placing all-star teams on the field each week hampered the sport. The Canton Morning News put a $20,000 price tag on the Massillon Tigers 1906 team, while many speculate that the Bulldogs probably cost even more. Still, others contend that the games involving top teams like Canton and Massilon were too one-sided and lacked excitement.

While Massillon was still able to field a local team in 1907 and still win the Ohio League championship, the Canton team folded. Blondy Wallace may have lost more than money. His libel suit never came to trial. The reason was probably that he settled out of court, rather than that Massillon had some sort of secret evidence. This leaves the scandal still disputed by historians and football fans alike. Because Wallace settled out of court, we have only charges and countercharges instead of a real end to the fixing scandal.

=== Harry Turner era ===
In 1911, Canton finally fielded a new team called the Canton Professionals. The team was made up entirely of local players and the pay was undoubtedly small. In their comeback season, the Pros finished in second place in the standing behind Peggy Parratt and the Shelby Blues. In 1914, the Pros challenged Parratt, this time with the Akron Indians, for the Ohio League title. In a game that served as a precursor to the championship, Canton defeated Parratt, however, Canton captain Harry Turner, was severely injured during the game while attempting to tackle Akron's Joe Collins. He later died of a fracture to his spinal cord. According to Canton manager Jack Cusack, who was at Turner's bedside when he died, his last words were "I know I must go," he said, "but I'm satisfied, for we beat Peggy Parratt." Canton won the game 6–0. The death of Turner was taken hard by the team. It was the first fatal accident involving a major professional football team in Ohio. The Professionals easily lost a rematch to the Indians a few days later.

=== Jim Thorpe era ===
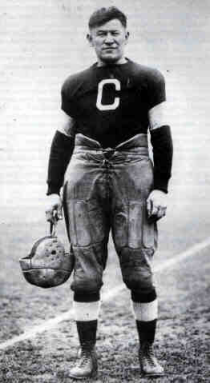
Jim Thorpe during his tenure with the Bulldogs.

In 1915, Massillon and Canton began hiring several players away from the Akron Pros. Jack Cusack, who had become manager of the Canton team, restored the old Bulldog name. As the first of two Canton-Massillon games approached, Cusack signed Jim Thorpe for $250 a game. Thorpe did not play much in the Bulldogs' first game, at Massillon, which the Tigers won 16–0. In the second game, Thorpe took over as the team's coach and played the entire game. He kicked two field goals in a 6–0 Canton win.

In 1916, the Bulldogs went undefeated, beat Massillon 24–0, and were generally recognized as the professional champions, not only of Ohio, but also of the country. The average attendance for a game before Thorpe's signing was 1,500. That soon rose to 6,000 and eventually reached 8,000 spectators, which was the capacity of Canton's League Park. Thorpe would remain the chief attendance draw in professional football until Red Grange entered the game in 1925. Because Thorpe was able to draw big crowds to Canton for games, Cusack was able to put together a financially stable squad that included several former All-Americans, including Cub Buck, who also coached at Carleton College at the time.

In 1917, the Bulldogs won their first eight games to claim the league championship. Neither Canton nor Massillon played during the 1918 season because of the Great War and the flu pandemic. Cusack left the team that year to start up an oil business in Oklahoma and Ralph Hay, a successful auto dealer, took over managing the team. Hay kept Cusack's team pretty much intact in 1919 and the Bulldogs won their third league championship in four years. They played the Hammond Pros, twice in Chicago at Cubs Park, now called Wrigley Field, in front of crowds of 10,000 fans.

=== National Football League (NFL) ===
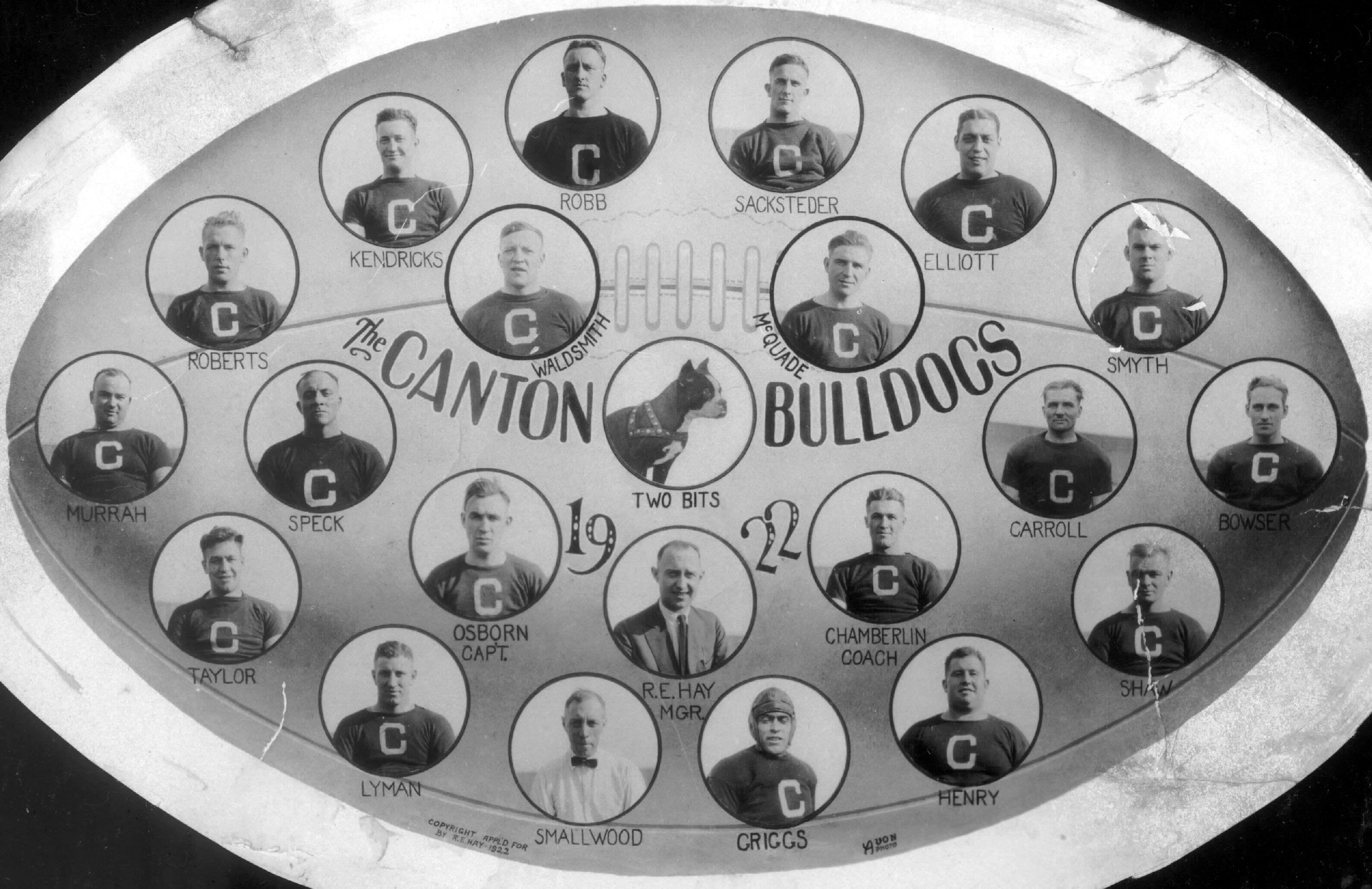
The Canton Bulldogs players depicted in 1922, their first NFL championship.

While the Bulldogs were selling out stadiums and promoting professional football in America, many teams were in serious financial trouble. These teams, who were trying to compete with the Bulldogs, were spending more money than they could afford and were stealing players from one another, which drove salaries even higher. In 1920 at Hay's auto showroom, known for Hupmobiles, the American Professional Football Association was organized. As the best-known personality in football, Thorpe was named the APFA's first permanent president. After scheduling a showcase game between Canton and the Buffalo All-Americans in New York City in December 1920, Thorpe left the Bulldogs at the end of the 1920 season.

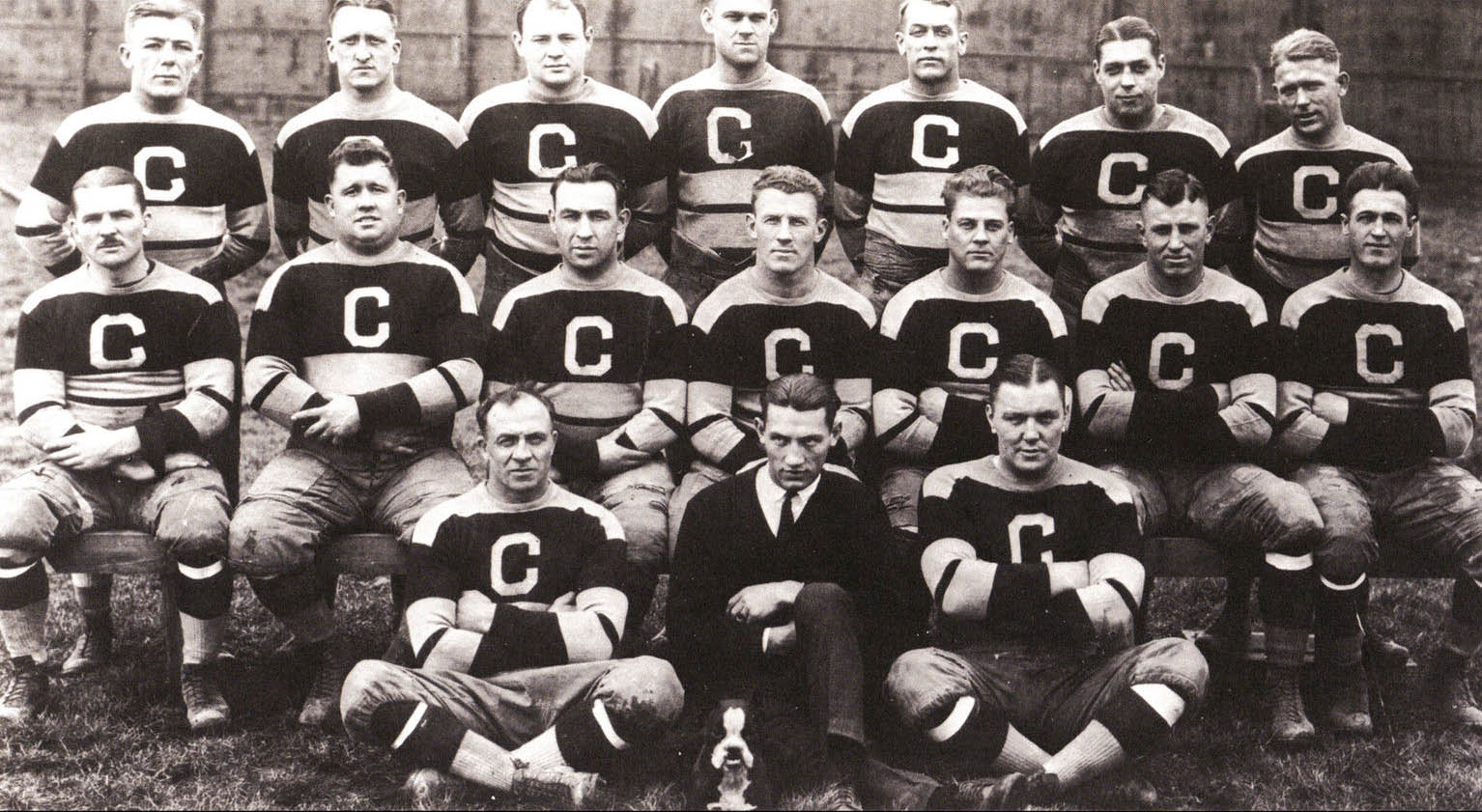
Canton Bulldogs in 1923, back-to-back NFL champions.

In the APFA, the Bulldogs found the competition somewhat tougher than expected. Canton had a respectable 9–5–4 record over the next two seasons. The APFA became the National Football League in 1922 and Hay hired Guy Chamberlin as Canton's player-coach. Chamberlin rebuilt the Bulldogs into a championship team. He kept just five players from the 1921 squad. As a player, Chamberlin led his team past the Chicago Cardinals in 1922 by blocking a punt that set up a touchdown, and running back two interceptions for touchdowns to beat the Cards' 20–3. The Bulldogs went on to win back-to-back NFL championships in 1922 and 1923.

However, Canton suffered several setbacks in 1923. First Hay announced that he was stepping down as the team's manager. His asking price for the team was $1,500, which was decided to be about $500 more than the 1922 champions were worth. Things were still up in the air when Hay and Chamberlin left for Chicago to represent the Bulldogs at the league's summer meeting. When Ralph Hay returned to Canton, he sold the Bulldogs on a group of local businessmen who formed the Canton Athletic Company to run the team. Chamberlin stayed on as coach, assuring the team of success on the field. Success at the gate was not nearly so likely.

=== Cleveland Bulldogs ===
As the payroll for Canton players became too expensive, the team lost about $13,000 in 1923 and the Canton Athletic Company sold the franchise in August for $2,500 to Cleveland promoter Samuel Deutsch, owner of the NFL's Cleveland Indians. He added seven players from Canton, renamed his team the Cleveland Bulldogs, and they won the 1924 NFL championship. Chamberlin also served as a player-coach of the Cleveland Bulldogs. He became the first to coach NFL champions in three consecutive years.

=== Return to Canton and Hall-of-Fame legacy ===
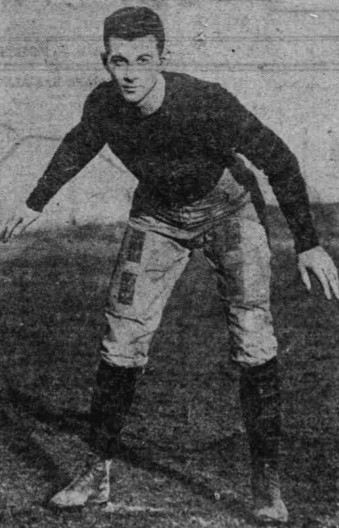
Jack Sack, who played for the Bulldogs in 1926

Deutsch then sold the franchise back to a group of Canton investors for $3,000 and the Canton Bulldogs were back in the NFL, along with the Cleveland Bulldogs. Canton had an overall record of 4–4–0 in 1925 and 1–9–3 in 1926, during which time they were coached by future Hall of Fame coach Pete Henry. Before the 1927 season, the league decided to purge itself of some of the weaker franchises. Twelve teams were jettisoned, including Canton and three other charter members of the APFA.

Despite the Bulldogs folding in 1927, the team's heritage played a major role in Canton's selection as the location of the Pro Football Hall of Fame. First, the NFL was organized in a Canton automobile showroom on September 17, 1920. Secondly, the Canton Bulldogs were one of the early powers of pro football both before and after 1920. An NFL charter member, the Bulldogs became the new league's first two-time champions with undefeated seasons in 1922 and 1923. Finally, Jim Thorpe, the first big-name athlete to play pro football, began his pro tenure with the 1915 Canton Bulldogs.

In late 1959, the citizens of Canton responded enthusiastically to a Canton Repository editorial that pointed out why a Hall of Fame should be located in their city. The city's foundations and individuals banded together to first win site designation from the NFL and then raise $378,026 to build a hall of fame on wooded parkland donated by the city. Ground-breaking was held in August 1962, and the Hall was opened on September 7, 1963.

== Pro Football Hall of Famers ==
Canton Bulldogs Hall of Famers
Players
No.	Name	Position	Tenure	Inducted
—	Guy Chamberlin	End/HB; Coach	1919; 1922–1923	1965
—	Joe Guyon	T/HB	1919–1920	1966
—	Wilbur "Pete" Henry	T Coach	1920–1923; 1925–1926	1963
—	William "Link" Lyman	T	1922–1923, 1925	1964
—	Greasy Neale	End	1917	1969
—	Jim Thorpe	Back; Coach	1915–1917, 1919–1920	1963

== Season-by-season ==
Year	League	W	L	T	Finish	Coach	Outcome
1905	Ohio	8	2	0	2nd	Bill Laub, Blondy Wallace	Lost Championship to Massillon Tigers
1906	Ohio	10	1	0	2nd	Blondy Wallace	Lost Championship to Massillon Tigers
1907	Did not play						
1908	Did not play						
1909	Did not play						
1910	Did not play						
1911	Ohio	8	1	0	2nd	Ben Clarke	Lost Championship to Shelby Blues
1912	Ohio	7	4	0		Harry Blythe	
1913	Ohio	4	2	2		Harry Hazlett	
1914	Ohio	9	1	0	2nd	Harry Hazlett	Lost Championship to Akron Indians
1915	Ohio	5	2	0	1st	Harry Hazlett, Jim Thorpe	Co-Champions with the Massillon Tigers and Youngstown Patricians
1916	Ohio	9	0	1	1st	Jim Thorpe	Champions: defeated Massillon Tigers
1917	Ohio	9	1	0	1st	Jim Thorpe	Champions: defeated Massillon Tigers
1918	Did not play						
1919	Ohio	9	0	1	1st	Jim Thorpe	Champions: defeated Massillon Tigers
1920	APFA	7	4	2	8th	Jim Thorpe	
1921	APFA	5	2	3	4th	Cap Edwards	
1922	NFL	10	0	2	1st	Guy Chamberlin	NFL Champions
1923	NFL	11	0	1	1st	Guy Chamberlin	NFL Champions
1924	Did not play						
1925	NFL	4	4	0	11th	Harry Robb	
1926	NFL	1	9	3	20th	Harry Robb, Pete Henry	
Totals		107	33	14			

== Notes ==
Achievements
Preceded by Akron Indians; 1913 & 1914	Ohio League Champions; Canton Bulldogs; Massillon Tigers; Youngstown Patricians; 1915	Succeeded by Canton Bulldogs; 1916
Preceded by Canton Bulldogs; Massillon Tigers; Youngstown Patricians; 1915	Ohio League Champions; Canton Bulldogs; 1916 & 1917	Succeeded by Dayton Triangles; 1918
Preceded by Dayton Triangles; 1918	Ohio League Champions; Canton Bulldogs; 1919	Succeeded by NFL established in 1920
Preceded by Chicago Staleys; 1921	NFL Champions; Canton Bulldogs; 1922, 1923	Succeeded by Cleveland Bulldogs; 1924
