= 1915 Massillon Tigers season =

American football team season

- Head coach: Stan Cofall
- Home stadium: Hospital Grounds Stadium

Results
- Record: 5–2

The 1915 Massillon Tigers football season was the sixth season of competition for the Massillon Tigers franchise, and their first season since 1907. The team posted a 5–2 record and obtained a share of the 1915 Ohio League Championship, with the Canton Bulldogs and the Youngstown Patricians.

== Schedule ==
Game	Date	Opponent	Result
1	October 10, 1915	Cleveland Blepp-Knits	W 41–3
2	October 24, 1915	at Detroit Mack Park Maroons	W 9–7
3	October 31, 1915	Columbus Panhandles	L 0–16
4	November 7, 1915	at Martins Ferry Athletics	W 47–0
5	November 14, 1915	Canton Bulldogs (Note: This was Jim Thorpe's first professional football game. He was used sparingly by coach Harry Hazlett. Hazlett was shortly thereafter fired by manager Jack Cusack for benching Thorpe, which Cusack felt may have cost Canton the game.) (Note: This was the first game between these two teams since the Canton Bulldogs–Massillon Tigers betting scandal of 1906.)	W 16–0
6	November 21, 1915	at Toledo Maroons	W 3–0
7	November 28, 1915	at Canton Bulldogs	L 0–6

== Sources ==
- "Thorpe Arrives" (PDF). PFRA Annual. Professional Football Researchers Association: 1–5. Archived from the original (PDF) on March 11, 2012.
- Pro Football Archives: 1915 Massillon Tigers
