= 1915 Canton Bulldogs season =

American football team season

- Head coach: Harry Hazlett, Jim Thorpe
- Home stadium: League Field

Results
- Record: 5–2

The 1915 Canton Bulldogs season was their sixth season that the Canton Bulldogs franchise competed in the Ohio League, a professional American football sports league. For the first time since 1906, that the team was once again called the "Bulldogs". The season also marked the arrival of the legendary Jim Thorpe to the Canton lineup. The team finished with a known record of 5–2 and a share of the Ohio League title with the Massillon Tigers and the Youngstown Patricians.

== Schedule ==
Game	Date	Opponent	Result	Ref.
1	October 10, 1915	Wheeling Athletic Club	W 75–0	
2	October 17, 1915	Columbus Panhandles	W 7–0	
3	October 24, 1915	at Detroit Heralds	L 3–9	
4	October 31, 1915	North Cincinnati Athletic Club	W 41–12	
5	November 7, 1915	Altoona Indians	W 38–0	
6	November 14, 1915	at Massillon Tigers (Note: This was Jim Thorpe's first professional football game. He was used sparingly by coach Harry Hazlett. Hazlett was shortly thereafter fired by manager Jack Cusack for benching Thorpe, which Cusack felt may have cost Canton the game.) (Note: This was the first game between these two teams since the Canton Bulldogs–Massillon Tigers betting scandal of 1906.)	L 0–16	
7	November 21, 1915	at Shelby Blues	Canceled	
8	November 28, 1915	Massillon Tigers	W 6–0	

== Sources ==
- Pro Football Archives: Canton Bulldogs 1915
