= Action at Anguar =

1945 short documentary film

Action at Angaur
- Action at Anguar
- Produced by: US War Department
- Release date: 1945
- Running time: 27 minutes
- Country: United States
- Language: English

Action at Angaur is a 1945 short documentary film created by the United States War Department during World War II. The film was created for the 7th War Loan drive and documents the untried 81st Infantry "Wildcat" Division in the Battle of Angaur in the Palau Islands.
