= General Frank =

General Frank may refer to:

- August Frank (1898–1984), German SS lieutenant general
- Karl Hermann Frank (1898–1946), German SS lieutenant general
- Patrick Frank (fl. 1980s–2020s), U.S. Army major general

== See also ==
- Gustave H. Franke (1888–1953), U.S. Army major general
- Victor Franke (1865−1936), German major general
