= 86th Training Division =

86th Infantry Division
- 86th Infantry Division shoulder sleeve insignia
- Active: 5 August 1917–January 1919 (National Army); 10 September 1921–30 December 1946 (Organized Reserves); 11 February 2009–18 September 2010 (86th Training Bge.); 18 September 2010–present (86th Training Div.)
- Country: United States
- Branch: United States Army Reserve
- Role: Training
- Size: Division
- Part of: 84th Training Command
- Garrison/HQ: Fort McCoy
- Nickname: "Blackhawk Division"
- Engagements: World War I; World War II; Central Europe
- Decorations: Meritorious Unit Commendation
- Website: Official website

Commanders
- Current commander: BG Paul L. Kuettner
- Command Sergeant Major: CSM Santi S. Khoundet

Insignia
- Subdued shoulder sleeve insignia

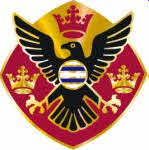
- Distinctive unit insignia

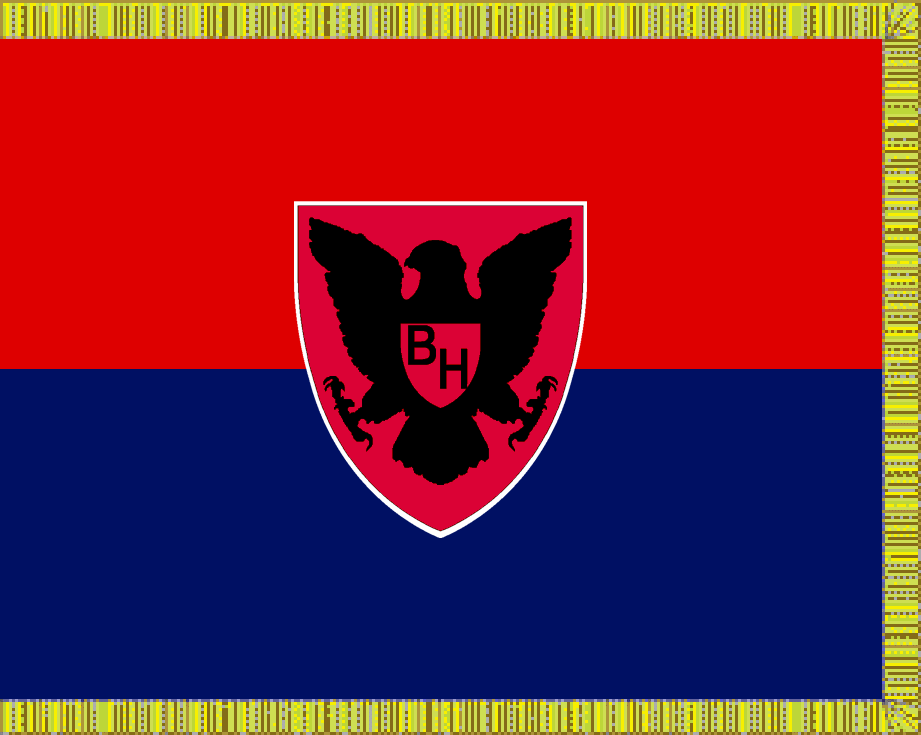
- Flag

The 86th Infantry Division, also known as the Blackhawk Division, was a unit of the United States Army in World War I and World War II. Currently called the 86th Training Division, based at Fort McCoy, Wisconsin, members of the division now work with Active Army, Reserve, and National Guard units to provide them with a Decisive Action Training Environment on a yearly basis.

== History ==
=== World War I ===
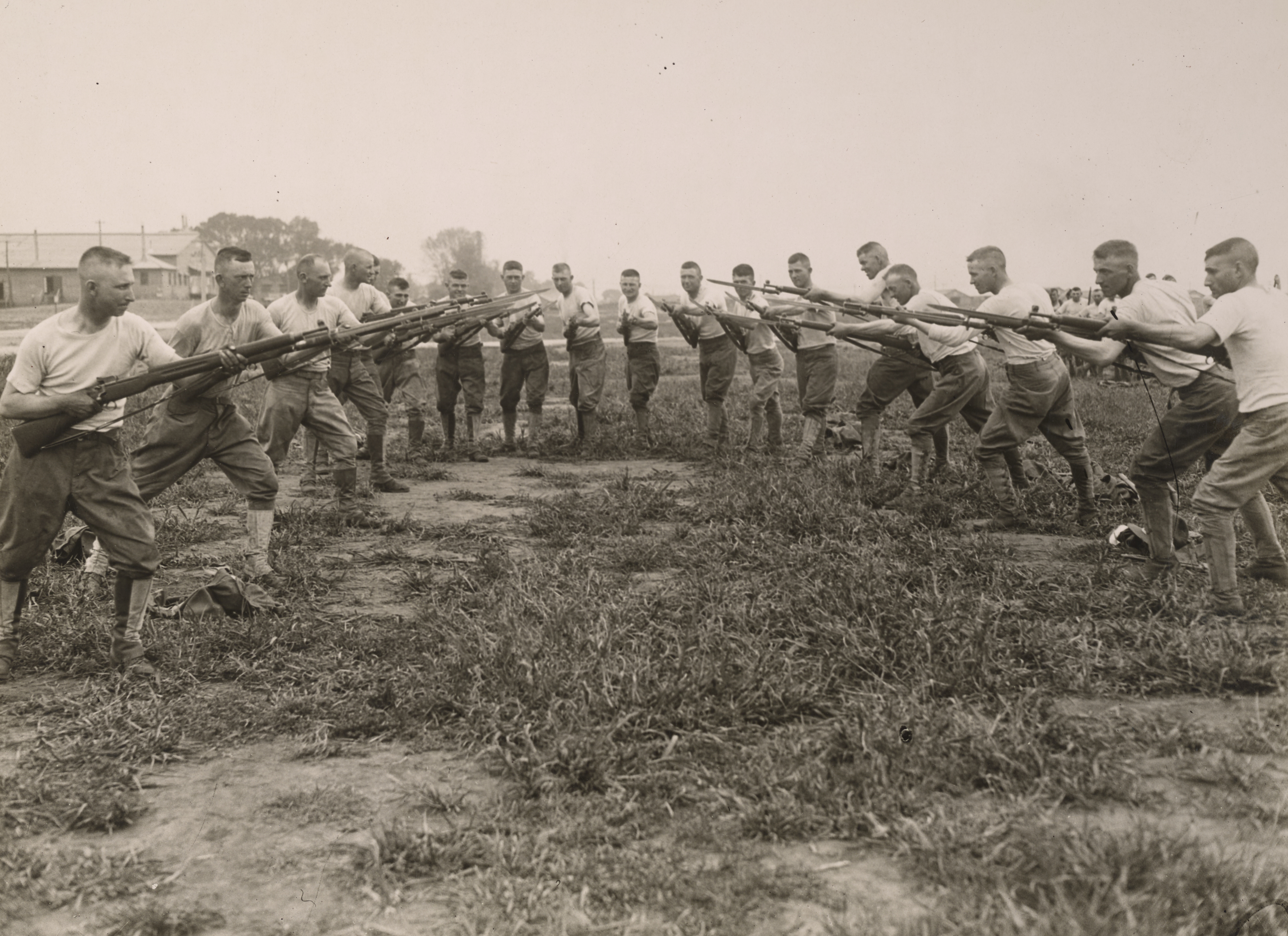
Doughboys of Company L, 343rd Infantry Regiment, 86th Division, during bayonet practise at Camp Grant, Rockford, Illinois.

The 86th Division was first organized on August 25, 1917, about four months after the American entry into World War I, at Camp Grant, Rockford, Illinois. A small cadre of Regular Army officers and enlisted men, in addition to Officers Reserve Corps and National Army officer graduates of the First Officers Training Camp held at Fort Sheridan, Illinois, staffed the division and coordinated its organization, while the enlisted men were predominantly Selective Service men drawn from the states of Illinois and Wisconsin. The drafted men arrived by the end of September, around which time systematic training began.

In early October 1917, 5,400 men were transferred to the 33rd Division. Between January and August 1918, over 100,000 men were processed at Camp Grant, with 80,000 transferred out of the camp; this included 8,000 to the 33rd Division, 4,500 to the 4th Division, 2,500 to the 85th Division, 1,000 to Camp Johnston, Florida, and large contingents directly to ports of embarkation. The 86th Division subsequently declined to a strength of 10,000 by April 1918, but by August, reached full strength again by new drafts and transfers from Camp Grant's depot brigade, many hailing from Illinois and Wisconsin. The division began to depart from the United States in August 1918, with the first elements of the division arriving to reinforce the American Expeditionary Forces (AEF) in France in late September, while the last arrived in the first week of October.

The division was sent to the area around Bordeaux, with the division's headquarters being established at Saint-André-de-Cubzac. As the AEF's Meuse–Argonne offensive, launched in late September, continued to grind on, there was an increasing need for replacements for the heavy casualties the AEF was sustaining in the campaign. This, as well as the shortage of replacements being sent overseas each month, contributed to a decision by General John J. Pershing, Commander-in-Chief (C-in-C) of the AEF, to break up newly arrived divisions, the 86th being one of them, to bring the other severely depleted AEF divisions up to strength. As a result, the 86th Division, in particular its infantry and machine gun units, was ordered to be skeletonized. By November 8 the remnants of the division was ordered to the area around Le Mans. Three days later the Armistice with Germany caused the war to come to an end.

In January 1919 the skeletonized division headquarters, the infantry regiments and the machine gun battalions began returning to the United States, as did the 311th Field Signal Battalion. The 161st Field Artillery Brigade, which upon its arrival in France had moved to the Le Courneau area, returned home in the following weeks, while the 311th Engineer Regiment returned in June.

==== Order of battle ====
- Headquarters, 86th Division
- 171st Infantry Brigade
  - 341st Infantry Regiment
  - 342nd Infantry Regiment
  - 332nd Machine Gun Battalion
- 172nd Infantry Brigade
  - 343rd Infantry Regiment
  - 344th Infantry Regiment
  - 333rd Machine Gun Battalion
- 161st Field Artillery Brigade
  - 331st Field Artillery Regiment (75 mm)
  - 332nd Field Artillery Regiment (75 mm)
  - 333rd Field Artillery Regiment (155 mm)
  - 311th Trench Mortar Battery
- Headquarters Troop, 86th Division
- 331st Machine Gun Battalion
- 311th Engineer Regiment
- 311th Field Signal Battalion
- 311th Train Headquarters and Military Police
  - 311th Ammunition Train
  - 311th Supply Train
  - 311th Engineer Train
  - 311th Sanitary Train
    - 341st, 342nd, 343rd, and 344th Ambulance Companies and Field Hospitals

==== Commanders ====
- Maj. Gen. Thomas H. Barry (25 August 1917)
- Brig. Gen. Lyman W. V. Kennon (26 November 1917)
- Maj. Gen. Thomas H. Barry (15 February 1918)
- Brig. Gen. Lyman W. V. Kennon (21 March 1918)
- Maj. Gen. Charles H. Martin (18 April 1918)
- Brig. Gen. Lincoln C. Andrews (19 October 1918)
- Maj. Gen. Charles C. Ballou (19 November 1918)

==== Nickname and legacy ====
The division was nicknamed the "Black Hawk Division" after the Sauk chief Black Hawk, who lived in the area of what is now Illinois. Frederic McLaughlin was a commander with the 333rd Machine Gun Battalion of the 86th Infantry Division during World War I. In 1926, McLaughlin was granted a franchise by the National Hockey League, which he named the Chicago Blackhawks after his wartime unit.

=== Interwar period ===
The 86th Division headquarters arrived at the port of Hoboken, New Jersey, aboard the troopship USS Siboney on 3 January 1919 after 4 months of overseas service and was demobilized on 18 April 1919 at Camp Custer, Michigan. Pursuant to the National Defense Act of 1920, the 86th Division was reconstituted in the Organized Reserve on 24 June 1921, allotted to the Sixth Corps Area, and assigned to the XVI Corps. The division was further allotted to the state of Illinois as its home area. The division headquarters was organized on 10 September 1921 at the Federal Building in Chicago. The headquarters was relocated on 18 October 1921 to the Leiter Building at 14 East Congress Street and remained there until activated for World War II. To maintain communications with the officers of the division, the chief of staff published a newsletter named “The Blackhawk Bulletin” in keeping with the division’s nickname and the military, geographical, and historical background of the region from which it drew its personnel. The newsletter informed the division’s members of such things as when and where the inactive training sessions were to be held, what the division’s summer training quotas were, where the camps were to be held, and which units would be assigned to help conduct the Citizens Military Training Camps (CMTC).

The designated mobilization and training station for the division was Camp Custer, the location where much of the 86th Division’s training activities occurred in the interwar years. The headquarters and staff usually trained with the staff of the 6th Division's 12th Infantry Brigade, either at Camp Custer or at Fort Sheridan. The subordinate infantry regiments of the division held their summer training primarily with the 2nd Infantry Regiment at Camp Custer beginning in June 1923. Other units, such as the special troops, artillery, engineers, aviation, medical, and quartermaster, trained at various posts in the Sixth and Seventh Corps Areas. For example, the division’s artillery trained with the 1st Battalion, 14th Field Artillery at Camp Custer; the special troops trained with equivalent elements of the National Guard's 32nd Division at Camp Grayling, Michigan, or Camp Sparta (later McCoy), Wisconsin; the 310th Medical Regiment trained at Fort Snelling, Minnesota; and the 310th Observation Squadron trained with the 15th Observation Squadron at Chanute Field, Illinois. In addition to the unit training camps, the infantry regiments of the division rotated responsibility to conduct the CMTC training held at Camp Custer and Fort Sheridan each year.

On a number of occasions, the division participated in Sixth Corps Area or Second Army command post exercises (CPXs) in conjunction with other Regular Army, National Guard, and Organized Reserve units. These training events gave division staff officers’ opportunities to practice the roles they would be expected to perform in the event the division was mobilized. Unlike the Regular and Guard units in the Sixth Corps Area, the 86th Division did not participate in the various Sixth Corps Area maneuvers and the Second Army maneuvers of 1935, 1939, and 1940 as an organized unit due to lack of enlisted personnel and equipment. Instead, the officers and a few enlisted reservists were assigned to Regular and Guard units to fill vacant slots and bring the units up to war strength for the exercises. Additionally, some were assigned duties as umpires or as support personnel.

=== World War II ===
- Ordered into active military service: 15 December 1942 at Camp Howze, Texas.
- Overseas: 19 February 1945, for the ETO; 24 August 1945, for the Pacific
- Campaigns: Central Europe
- Days of combat: 34
- Awards: DSC-4; DSM-1; SS-12; LM-1; SM-1; BSM-282; AM-2
- Commanders: Maj. Gen. Alexander E. Anderson (December 1942), Maj. Gen. Harris M. Melasky (4 January 1943 – December 1945), Maj. Gen. Paul J. Mueller (January 1946 – April 1946), Maj. Gen. Herman F. Kramer (April 1946 – July 1946), Maj. Gen. Harry F. Hazlett (July 1946 to inactivation)
- Returned to U.S.: 17 June 1945, from the ETO, "the first combat division to return from the European theater."
- Overseas: 24 August 1945
- Deactivated: 30 December 1946 on Leyte, Philippine Islands

==== Mobilization ====
Before Organized Reserve infantry divisions were ordered into active military service, they were reorganized on paper as "triangular" divisions under the 1940 tables of organization. The headquarters companies of the two infantry brigades were consolidated into the division's cavalry reconnaissance troop, and one infantry regiment was removed by inactivation. The field artillery brigade headquarters and headquarters battery became the headquarters and headquarters battery of the division artillery. Its three field artillery regiments were reorganized into four battalions; one battalion was taken from each of the two 75 mm gun regiments to form two 105 mm howitzer battalions, the brigade's ammunition train was reorganized as the third 105 mm howitzer battalion, and the 155 mm howitzer battalion was formed from the 155 mm howitzer regiment. The engineer, medical, and quartermaster regiments were reorganized into battalions. In 1942, divisional quartermaster battalions were split into ordnance light maintenance companies and quartermaster companies, and the division's headquarters and military police company, which had previously been a combined unit, was split.

==== Division organization ====
The division consisted of the following units:

86th Infantry Division organization (click to enlarge)

- 86th Infantry Division
  - 86th Infantry Division Headquarters
  - 86th Cavalry Reconnaissance Troop (Mechanized) (M3 scout cars and then M8 Greyhound armored cars)
  - 341st Infantry Regiment
    - Headquarters and Headquarters Company
    - 3× Infantry battalions
      - each battalion consists of: 1× Headquarters and Headquarters Company, 3× Rifle companies, 1× Heavy Weapons Company
    - Cannon Company (T12 Gun Motor Carriages and T19 Howitzer Motor Carriages, later replaced by either M3 105mm towed howitzers or M7 Priest self propelled howitzers)
    - Anti-Tank Company (M3 37mm anti-tank guns, which were replaced by 1944 with M1 57mm anti-tank guns)
    - Service Company
  - 342nd Infantry Regiment
    - same organization as 341st Infantry Regiment
  - 343rd Infantry Regiment
    - same organization as 341st Infantry Regiment
  - 86th Infantry Division Artillery
    - Headquarters and Headquarters Battery
    - 331st Field Artillery Battalion
      - Headquarters and Headquarters Battery
      - 3× Batteries (M2 105mm towed howitzers)
      - Service Battery
    - 332nd Field Artillery Battalion
      - same organization as 331st Field Artillery Battalion
    - 404th Field Artillery Battalion
      - Headquarters and Headquarters Battery
      - 3× Batteries (M1 155mm towed howitzers)
      - Service Battery
    - 911th Field Artillery Battalion
      - same organization as 331st Field Artillery Battalion
  - Headquarters Special Troops
    - Headquarters Company, 86th Infantry Division
    - 86th Signal Company
    - 86th Quartermaster Company
    - 786th Ordnance Light Maintenance Company
    - Military Police Platoon
    - 86th Infantry Division Band (attached)
  - 311th Engineer Combat Battalion
    - Headquarters and Headquarters and Service Company
    - 3× Engineer combat companies
  - 311th Medical Battalion
    - Headquarters and Headquarters Detachment
    - 3× Collecting companies
    - Clearing Company

The first appointed commander of the 86th Infantry Division, Major General Alexander E. Anderson, died of a sudden heart attack on 24 December 1942 at the age of 53. He was replaced in January 1943 by Major General Harris M. Melasky, who led the division throughout the remainder of its combat service in World War II. The General John Pope-class U.S. Army transport ship USS General A. E. Anderson (AP-111), launched on 2 May 1943, was named in honor of General Anderson.

==== Combat chronicle ====
In early January 1945, General Dwight D. Eisenhower, the Supreme Allied Commander on the Western Front, was alarmed over the swift progress the German forces had made during the waning Battle of the Bulge and was concerned that the Germans could move additional reinforcements to the Western Front from the Eastern Front. He requested additional divisions over and above those already earmarked for the European theater. The 86th and 97th infantry divisions, both of which were allocated for service in the Pacific War, were ordered to the European Theater of Operations (ETO) instead for the final assault on Germany.

The division arrived in France, on 4 March 1945, and moved to Cologne, Germany, taking over defensive positions near Weiden, 24 March, in relief of the veteran 8th Infantry Division. After a short period of patrolling on both sides of the River Rhine, the division was relieved, and moved across the Rhine to Eibelshausen, Germany, on 5 April. In a rapid offensive advance, the 86th moved across the Bigge River, cleared Attendorn, 11 April, and continued on to the Ruhr uniting with the Ninth Army, taking part in the Ruhr pocket fighting. On 21 April, the division moved to Ansbach and continued to advance, taking Eichstätt on the 25th, crossing the Danube at Ingolstadt on the 27th, securing the bridge over the Amper Canal, 29 April, crossing the Isar and reaching Mittel Isar Canal by the end of the month. The division was ordered to take Wasserburg, 1 May, and leading elements had reached the outskirts of the city when they were ordered to withdraw, 2 May, and to move east to Salzburg.

The 86th Infantry Division was recognized as a liberating unit by the US Army's Center of Military History and the United States Holocaust Memorial Museum in 1996. As the 86th advanced into the Ruhr region, the troops discovered the Attendorn civilian slave labor camp on April 11, 1945.

On 4 May, the division captured the crown jewels of Hungary in Mattsee, Austria. At the end of the war, the division was securing the left flank of the XV Corps. After processing German prisoners of war, it was redeployed to the United States, the 14,289 officers and men arriving in New York aboard four Navy transports 17 June 1945. The division trained briefly at Camp Gruber, Oklahoma, 21 June – 11 August 1945; and then left San Francisco, 24 August 1945, for the Philippines. The 86th Division was aboard ship in Leyte harbor when the Japanese surrendered. After landing on Luzon the unit was dispersed throughout the Island, some to Marikina, some to other locations. A few were assigned to Corregidor Island to guard Japanese prisoners of war. While Japan formally had surrendered on 2 September 1945, division soldiers still sometimes had to face Japanese soldiers who had refused to surrender as well as Huks (Hukbalahap guerrillas). According to one account, as late as October 1946 the "straggler menace was still there" as 77 Japanese prisoners were captured. A division officer (Lt. Col. A.L. Hugins) also "was fired on while in convoy near Angeles" in the same month.

The division was deactivated on 30 December 1946 in the Philippines.

==== Casualties ====
- Total battle casualties: 785
- Killed in action: 136
- Wounded in action: 615
- Missing in action: 12
- Prisoner of war: 19

==== Assignments in ETO ====
- 30 January 1945: Fifteenth Army, 12th Army Group.
- 22 March 1945: VII Corps, First Army, 12th Army Group.
- 30 March 1945: XXII Corps, Fifteenth Army, 12th Army Group.
- 5 April 1945: XVIII (Abn) Corps, First Army, 12th Army Group.
- 19 April 1945: Third Army, 12th Army Group.
- 22 April 1945: III Corps.
- 2 May 1945: XV Corps, Seventh Army, 6th Army Group.

== Twenty-first century ==
For decades during the Cold War, the 86th Army Reserve Command maintained the division's insignia and number, but as a TDA unit, did not formally carry on the formation's lineage.

The 86th was redesignated HQ 86th Training Brigade on 11 Feb 2009 and activated at Fort McCoy, Wisconsin on 16 September 2010. Shortly after its reactivation, on 18 September 2010, it was redesignated as Headquarters 86th Training Division.

The division is a subordinate unit of the 84th Training Command. As of January 2026 it consists of the following units:

- 86th Training Division, at Fort McCoy (WI)
  - Mission Training Complex (MTC), in Arlington Heights (IL)
  - 1st Brigade, in Milwaukee (WI)
    - 1st Mission Command Training Detachment (MCTD), at Fort Sill (OK)
      - 1st Branch, 1st MCTD, in Kansas City (MO)
    - 2nd Mission Command Training Detachment (MCTD), at Fort Snelling (MN)
    - 3rd Battalion, 290th Regiment (Observe/Controller Trainer — OC/T), in Mustang (OK)
    - 2nd Battalion, 383rd Regiment (Observe/Controller Trainer — OC/T), at Fort Leavenworth (KS)
      - Alpha Company, 2nd Battalion, 383rd Infantry Regiment (Observe/Controller Trainer — OC/T), in Elkhorn (NE)
  - 2nd Brigade, in Arlington Heights (IL)
    - 1st Mission Command Training Detachment (MCTD), in Arlington Heights (IL)
    - 2nd Mission Command Training Detachment (MCTD), in Edinburgh (IN)
      - 1st Branch, 2nd MCTD, in Livonia (MI)
    - 1st Battalion, 329th Regiment (Observe/Controller Trainer — OC/T), in Indianapolis (IN)
      - Bravo Company, 1st Battalion, 329th Infantry Regiment (Observe/Controller Trainer — OC/T), in Chicago (IL)
    - 3rd Battalion, 397th Regiment (Observe/Controller Trainer — OC/T), in Whitehall (OH)

== Notable personnel ==
- Edwin Hubble served in 2d Battalion, 343d Infantry Regiment as a major during World War I.
- Frederic McLaughlin, served in the division in World War I.
- Al Neuharth served in the division in World War II.

== Sources ==
- The Official History of the Eighty-Six Division 1921
- The Army Almanac: A Book of Facts Concerning the Army of the United States U.S. Government Printing Office, 1950
