= 1914 Columbus Panhandles season =

American football team season

- Head coach: Joseph F. Carr
- Home stadium: Indianola Park

Results
- Record: 7-2

The 1914 Columbus Panhandles season was their ninth season in existence. The team played in the Ohio League and posted a 7–2 record.

== Schedule ==
Game	Date	Opponent	Result
1	September 27, 1914	Columbus Wyandottes	W 57-0
2	October 4, 1914	at Akron Indians	W 26-0
3	October 11, 1914	at New Philadelphia Toscoras	W 37-0
4	October 18, 1914	Dayton Oakwoods	Canceled
5	October 25, 1914	at Canton Professionals	L 40-10
6	November 1, 1914	at Akron Indians	L 14-0
7	November 8, 1914	at Wabash Athletic Association	W 13-0
8	November 15, 1914	Toledo Maroons	W 7-4
9	November 22, 1914	Columbus Bates Pirates	W 41-0
10	November 29, 1914	Columbus Mendel All-Stars	W 19-2
