= 1914 Akron Indians season =

American football team season

- Head coach: Peggy Parratt
- Home stadium: League Park

Results
- Record: 9-2-1
- Division place: No divisions
- Playoffs: No playoffs

The 1914 Akron Indians season was their seventh season in existence. The team played in the Ohio League and posted a 9-2-1 record to win their fourth state title.

== Schedule ==
Week	Date	Opponent	Result	Record
1	September 13	Cleveland Genesees	W 24–0	1–0
2	September 20	Elyria Reserves	W 40–0	2–0
3	September 27	Buffalo Oakdales	W 32–0	3–0
4	October 4	Columbus Panhandles	L 0–26	3–1
5	October 11	Youngstown Patricians	T 7–7	3–1–1
6	October 18	Columbus Muldoons	W 66–0	4–1–1
7	October 25	Chicago First Regiment	W 38–0	5–1–1
8	November 1	Columbus Panhandles	W 14–0	6–1–1
9	November 15	at Canton Professionals	L 0–6	6–2–1
10	November 22	Cuyahoga Falls Philo Colts	W 14–0	7–2–1
11	November 26	at Canton Professionals	W 21–0	8–2–1
12	November 29	Toledo Maroons	W 7–3	9–2–1
