= 1914 Canton Professionals season =

American football team season

- Head coach: Harry Hazlett
- Home stadium: League Field

Results
- Record: 9-1

The 1914 Canton Professionals season was their fifth season in the Ohio League. The team finished with a known record of 9–1.

== Schedule ==
Game	Date	Opponent	Result	Record
1	September 20	New Philadelphia	W 7–0	1–0
2	September 27	Cleveland Broadway Athletic Club	W 60–0	2–0
3	October 4	Dayton Citizens	W 90–0	3–0
4	October 11	Altoona Indians	W 52–0	4–0
5	October 18	Youngstown Patricians	W 31–0	5–0
6	October 25	Columbus Panhandles	W 40–10	6–0
7	November 1	McKeesport Olympics	W 39–3	7–0
8	November 7	Shelby Blues	Rained out	7–0
9	November 15	Akron Indians	W 6–0	8–0
10	November 22	Shelby Blues	W 13–3	9–0
11	November 26	Akron Indians	L 0–21	9–1
