= 1914 Wabash Athletic Association football team =

American military football team

1914 Wabash Athletic Association football
- Conference: Independent
- Record: 8–2–1
- Home stadium: Carroll Street Field

The 1914 Wabash Athletic Association football team was an American semi-pro football team that represented the Wabash Athletic Association in the 1914 college football season. The team had an 8–2–1 record and outscored its opponents by a total of 363 to 36, including a 103-point win against the Elkhart Athletic Club. The loss against the Northwestern North Ends on October 25 was reported as the first loss at the W. A. A's home field in eight years.

== Schedule ==
Date	Opponent	Site	Result	Attendance
September 20	Muncie Industry Athletic Club	Carroll Street Field; Wabash, IN	W 71–0	
September 27	Elkhart Athletic Club	Carroll Street Field; Wabash, IN	W 103–0	
October 4	Dayton St. Mary's Cadets	Carroll Street Field; Wabash, IN	W 19–14	
October 11	Chicago All-Stars	Carroll Street Field; Wabash, IN	W 66–0	
October 18	at South Bend Silver Edges	Springbrook Park; South Bend, IN	T 0–0	
October 25	Evanston North Ends	Carroll Street Field; Wabash, IN	L 0–6	4,000
November 1	at Fort Wayne Friars	League Park; Fort Wayne, IN	W 23–3	
November 8	Columbus Panhandles	Carroll Street Field; Wabash, IN	L 0–13	
November 15	Indianapolis McGrew Specials	Carroll Street Field; Wabash, IN	W 46–0	
November 22	South Bend Silver Edges	Carroll Street Field; Wabash, IN	W 22–0	
November 26	Corby Hall of Notre Dame	Carroll Street Field; Wabash, IN	W 13–0	
