= United States Army Replacement and School Command =

Training and receiving formation of the United States Army during World War II

Replacement and School Command
- Shoulder sleeve insignia
- Active: 1942–1945
- Country: United States
- Branch: United States Army
- Type: Command
- Role: Training and receiving
- Size: 166,000 (1942); 481,000 (1945)
- Part of: Army Ground Forces
- Garrison/HQ: Birmingham, Alabama
- Engagements: World War II

The United States Replacement and School Command was a training and receiving formation of the United States Army during World War II.

== History ==
It was established as part of the Army Ground Forces in March 1942, after it was noted that divisions, though initially well-balanced, soon became unbalanced in combat as the infantry took casualties faster than other arms. When it started, the Replacement and School Command consisted of about 166,000 officers and men, and it reached its peak in May 1945 with 481,000 personnel.

The Command operated Replacement Training Centers (RTCs), especially Infantry Replacement Training Centers (IRTCs), in an effort to train new recruits to replace combat casualties. IRTCs included Fort McClellan in Alabama, Camp Roberts in California, Camp Blanding in Florida, Camp Wheeler in Georgia, and Camp Fannin, Camp Howze, and Fort Wolters in Texas. The Field Artillery Replacement Center was located at Fort Sill, Oklahoma, and was commanded by Ralph McT. Pennell.

The first commanding general of the Replacement and School Command was Courtney Hodges. Other commanding generals included Harold R. Bull and Harry Hazlett. Initially, training programs ran for 4 weeks, culminating at 17 weeks by the war's end.

Tony Cucolo notes that the men who trained at IRTCs replaced the dead: "The men trained here knew they were going to the deadliest places on the WWII battlefield."

== Shoulder sleeve insignia ==
The Replacement and School Command Shoulder Sleeve Insignia consisted of three vertical stripes of equal width of blue (on the left), yellow and scarlet (visually very similar to the flags of Chad and of Romania). The United States Army Institute of Heraldry notes that "the three stripes are in the colors of, and refer to, the basic combat arms (infantry, cavalry/armor and artillery); they also refer to the components of the "One Army" concept: Active Army, Army Reserve and Army National Guard."

The shoulder sleeve insignia is currently worn by the United States Army Training and Doctrine Command.

== In popular culture ==
In Frederick Buechner's 1958 novel The Return of Ansel Gibbs, a character jokes that the red was for "the blood you never shed... Blue for the ocean you never crossed. And yellow for the streak down your back."

== Commanding generals ==
- MG Courtney H. Hodges (March 9, 1942 - May 15, 1942)
- MG Harold R. Bull (May 19, 1942 - April 7, 1943)
- MG Harry F. Hazlett (April 8, 1943 - September 1, 1945)

=== Chief of Staff ===
- BG Harry F. Hazlett (March 9, 1942 - April 7, 1943)
- BG James W. Curtis (April 8, 1943 - September 1, 1945)
