= 81st Readiness Division =

Formation of the United States Army

81st Readiness Division 81st Infantry Division 81st Army Reserve Command (81st ARCOM) 81st Regional Support Command (81st RSC) 81st Regional Readiness Command (81st RRC) 81st Readiness Division (81st RD)
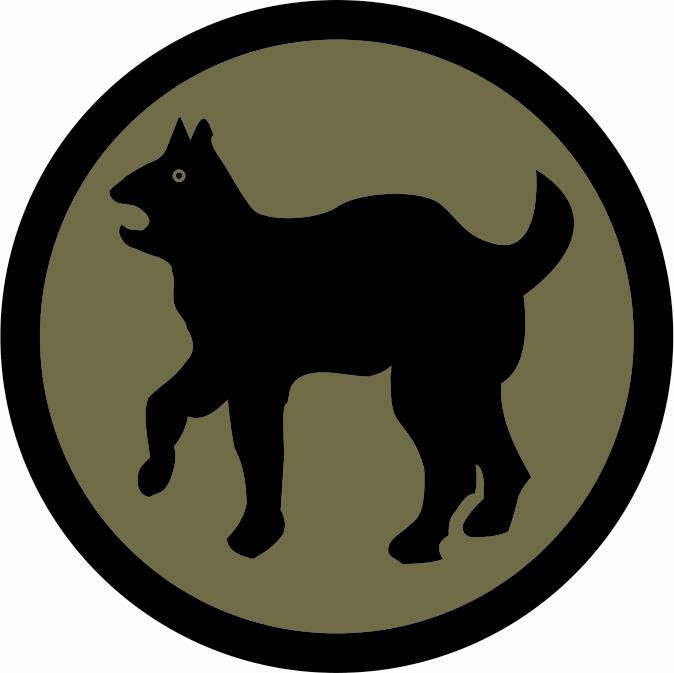
- Division shoulder sleeve insignia
- Active: 5 August 1917–11 June 1919 (National Army); 24 June 1921–20 January 1946 (Organized Reserve); 10 November 1947–31 December 1965 (Army Reserve); 1967–16 April 1996 (81st ARCOM); 16 April 1996–16 July 2003 (81st RSC); 16 July 2003–17 September 2008 (81st RRC); 17 September 2008–1 October 2018 (81st RSC); 1 October 2018–present (81st Readiness Div.)
- Country: United States
- Branch: United States Army Reserve
- Type: Infantry (1917–1946; Regular Army); Force Sustainment (1967–present; Army Reserve)
- Size: Division 1917–1946; Support Command 1967–Present
- Part of: United States Army Reserve Command
- Garrison/HQ: Fort Jackson, SC
- Nickname: "Wildcat" (special designation)
- Motto: "Wildcats never quit"
- March: The Wildcat March
- Mascot: Sergeant Tuffy the Wildcat
- Engagements: World War I; Meuse-Argonne; Lorraine 1918; World War II; Western Pacific; Leyte
- Decorations: Philippine Republic Presidential Unit Citation

Commanders
- Current commander: Maj. Gen. Karen S. Monday Gresham
- Command Sergeant Major: CSM Benny L. Hubbard
- Notable commanders: MG Charles Justin Bailey; MG Paul J. Mueller

Insignia
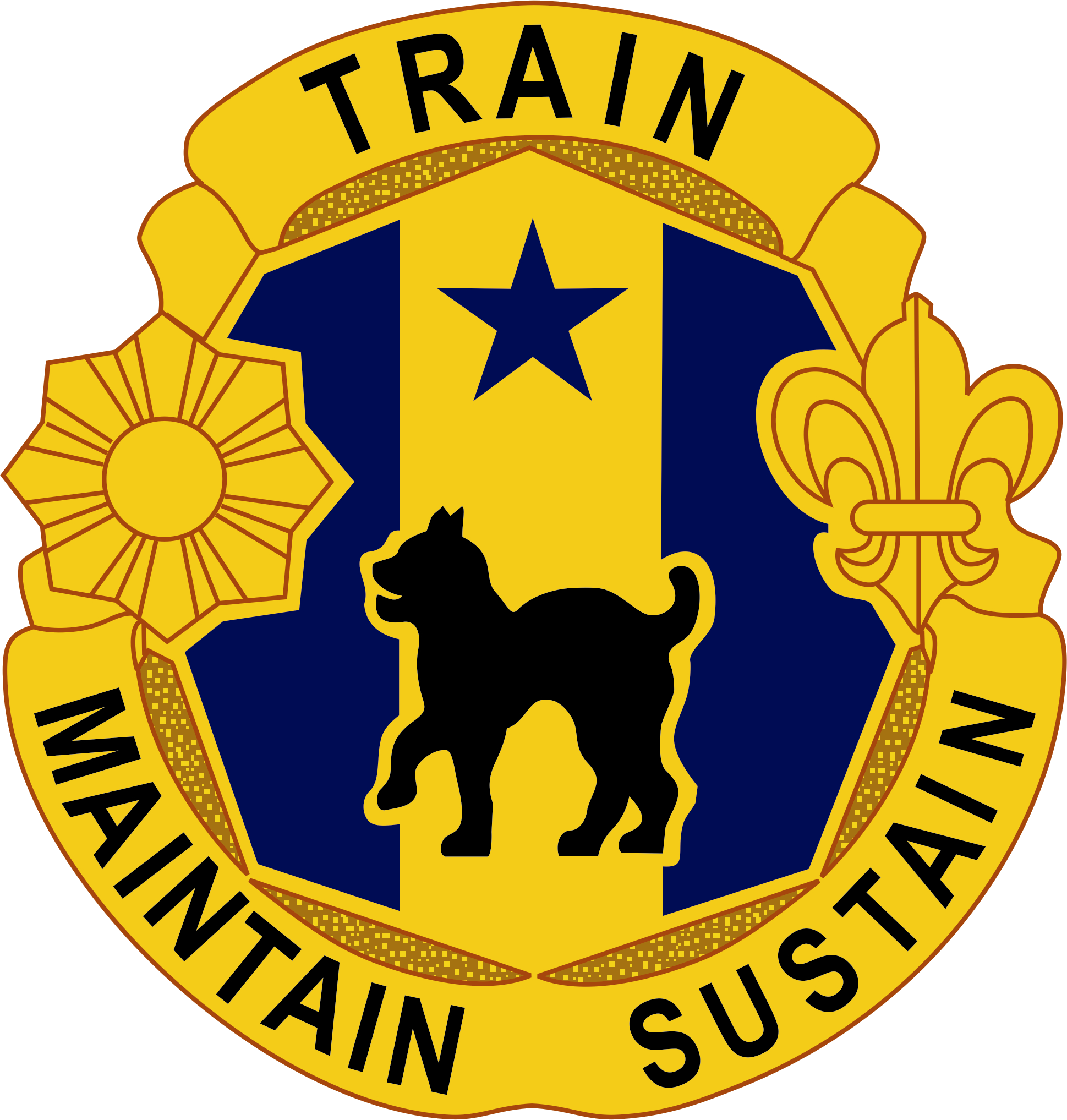
- Distinctive unit insignia of the 81st ARCOM (1970–1996) and 81st RSC

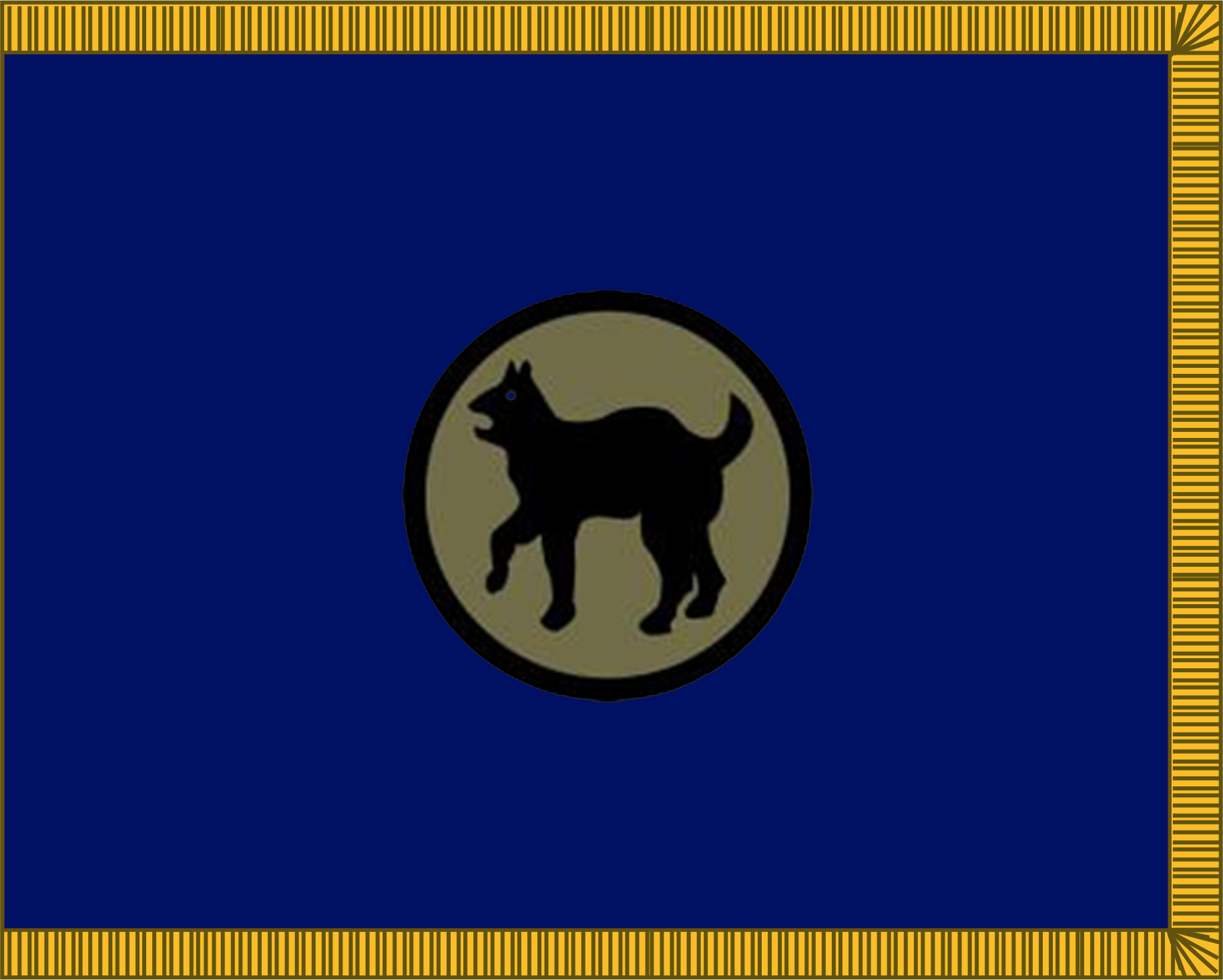
- 81st Readiness Division Flag

The 81st Readiness Division ("Wildcat") is a formation of the United States Army Reserve. It was originally organized as the 81st Infantry Division during World War I. After World War I, the 81st Division was allotted to the Organized Reserve as a "skeletonized" cadre division. In 1942, the division was reactivated and reorganized as the 81st Infantry Division and served in the Pacific during World War II. After World War II, the 81st Infantry Division became part of the United States Army Reserve after 1952) as a Class C cadre division, and stationed at Atlanta, Georgia. The 81st Infantry Division saw no active service during the Cold War and was inactivated in 1965.

In 1967 the division's shoulder sleeve insignia was adopted for use by the 81st Army Reserve Command (81st ARCOM). From 1967 to 1995, the 81st ARCOM was headquartered in East Point, Georgia, controlling Army Reserve units in Georgia, South Carolina, Puerto Rico and portions of North Carolina, Florida and Alabama. During that time, the 81st ARCOM was responsible for deploying US Army Reserve units to Vietnam, Southwest Asia, and the Balkans. The 81st was relocated in 1996 to Birmingham, Alabama—the first time the Wild Cats returned to Alabama since its moblization in 1942 at then Camp Rucker. Upon the relocation, the command was reorganized (along with the 121st Army Reserve Command from Birmingham, AL 1968-1992) as the 81st Regional Support Command (RSC) and was responsible command and control of all Army Reserve units in the southeast United States and Puerto Rico.

In 2003, the 81st RSC was reorganized as the 81st Regional Readiness Command (RRC), but retained essentially the same mission as its predecessor. In September 2008, the 81st RRC was inactivated at Birmingham, Alabama. In its place, a reorganized 81st Regional Support Command (RSC) was activated at Fort Jackson, South Carolina. Unlike its predecessor units, the new 81st RSC had a fundamentally different mission. Gone was the responsibility for hundreds of Troop Program Units (TPU) units and Soldiers. Instead, the 81st RSC provided Base Operations (BASOPS) support to 497 Army Reserve units in nine southeastern states plus Puerto Rico and the US Virgin Islands. By providing essential customer care and services, the 81st RSC was intended to help the supported Operational, Functional and Training (OF&T) commands to focus on their core unit mission and ultimately meet force requirements for global combatant commanders. In 2018, the 81st RSC was provisionally redesignated as the 81st Readiness Division, and designated to gain additional responsibilities from other Army Reserve Functional Commands in addition to the enduring BASOPS mission.

On 1 October 2018, the 81st RSC was officially reorganized as the 81st Readiness Division (USAR).

== History ==
=== World War I ===
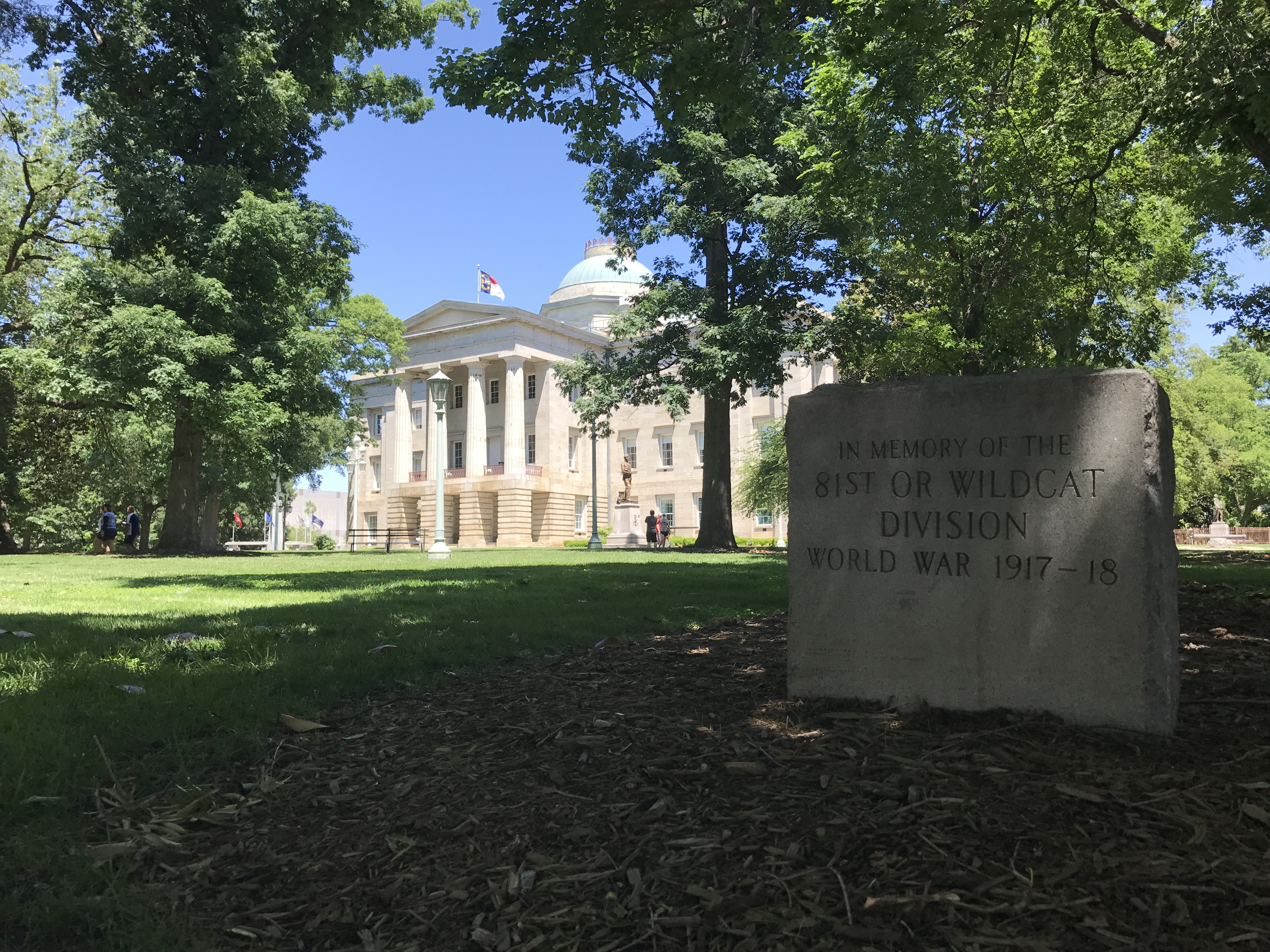
Memorial commemorating the unit's World War I service in front of the North Carolina State Capitol

The 81st Division was organized as a division of the United States Army in August 1917 during World War I at Camp Jackson, South Carolina. The division was originally organized with a small cadre of Regular Army, in addition to Officers Reserve Corps and National Army officers, while the soldiers were predominantly Selective Service men drawn from the southeastern states of Florida, North Carolina, and Tennessee. During October 1917, most of the enlisted men were transferred to other units, but additional drafts from Alabama, Florida, Georgia, North Carolina, South Carolina, and Tennessee replenished the strength of the division. After finishing training, the 81st Division, commanded by Major General Charles Justin Bailey, deployed to Europe, arriving on the Western Front in August 1918. Elements of the 81st Division first saw limited action by defending the St. Dié sector in September and early October. After relief of mission, the 81st Division was attached to the American First Army in preparation for the Meuse-Argonne Offensive. In the last days of World War I, the 81st Division attacked a portion of the German Army's defensive line on 9 November 1918, and remained engaged in combat operations until the Armistice with Germany at 1100 hours on 11 November 1918. The division sustained 461 casualties on the last day, 66 of them killed.

After the cessation of hostilities, the 81st Division remained in France until May 1919; after which the division was shipped back to the United States and inactivated on 11 June 1919.

- Activated: September 1917. Camp Jackson, South Carolina.
- Overseas: August 1918.
- Major Operations: Meuse-Argonne, Alsace-Lorraine.
- Casualties: Total – 1,104 (KIA – 195, WIA – 909).
- Commanders: Brig. Gen. Charles H. Barth (28 August 1917), Maj. Gen. Charles J. Bailey (8 October 1917), Brig. Gen. Charles H. Barth (24 November 1917), Brig. Gen. George W. McIver (28 December 1917), Maj. Gen. Charles J. Bailey (11 March 1918), Brig. Gen. George W. McIver (19 May 1918), Brig. Gen. Munroe McFarland (24 May 1918), Maj. Gen. Charles J. Bailey (30 May 1918), Brig. Gen. George W. McIver (9 June 1918), Maj. Gen. Charles J. Bailey (3 July 1918).
- Inactivated at Hoboken, New Jersey on 11 June 1919.

==== Order of battle ====
The division was composed of the following units:

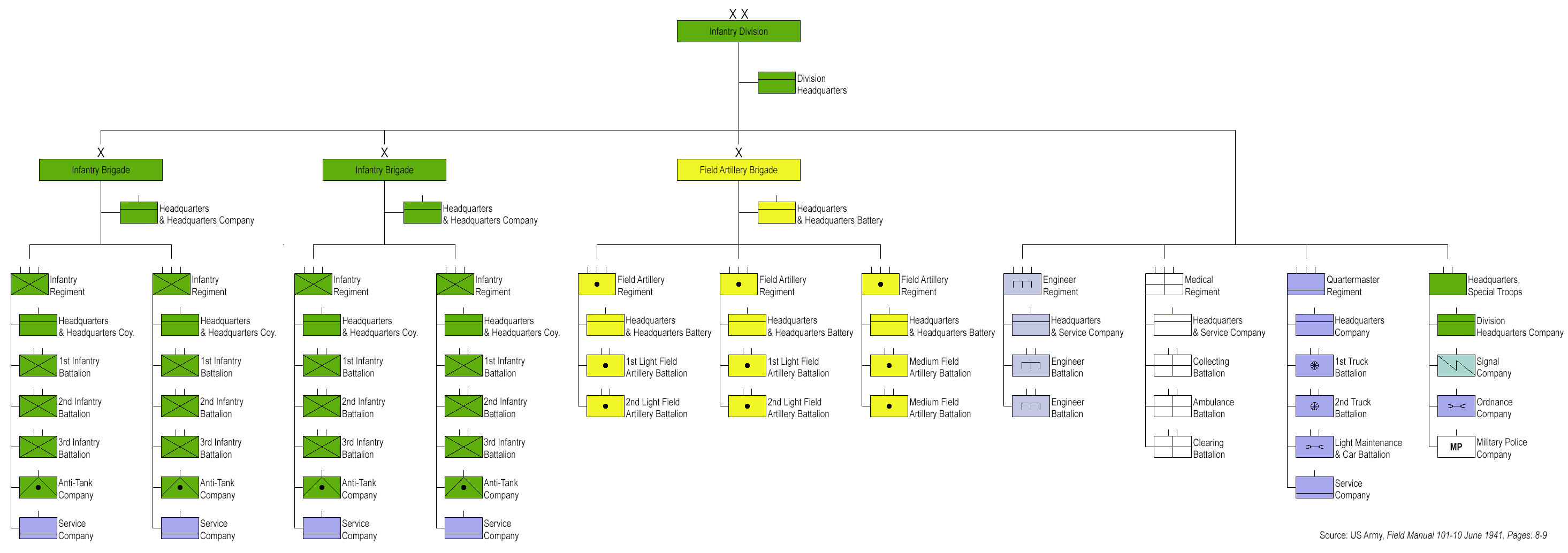
Square Division example: 1940 US Infantry Division. On the far left can be seen two Brigades of two Regiments each

- Headquarters, 81st Division
- 161st Infantry Brigade
  - 321st Infantry Regiment
  - 322nd Infantry Regiment
  - 317th Machine Gun Battalion
- 162nd Infantry Brigade
  - 323rd Infantry Regiment
  - 324th Infantry Regiment
  - 318th Machine Gun Battalion
- 156th Field Artillery Brigade
  - 316th Field Artillery Regiment (155 mm)
  - 317th Field Artillery Regiment (75 mm)
  - 318th Field Artillery Regiment (75 mm)
  - 306th Trench Mortar Battery
- 316th Machine Gun Battalion
- 306th Engineer Regiment
- 306th Field Signal Battalion
- Headquarters Troop, 81st Division
- 306th Train Headquarters and Military Police
  - 306th Ammunition Train
  - 306th Supply Train
  - 306th Engineer Train
  - 306th Sanitary Train
    - 321st, 322nd, 323rd, and 324th Ambulance Companies and Field Hospitals

==== Story of the wildcat ====
1919 U.S. Army flyer depicting the Insignia of the 81st (Stonewall) Division, American Expeditionary Forces, France 1918–19.

As the fighting divisions of the United States Army organized in 1917, commanders adopted distinctive nicknames and insignia, not only to foster esprit-de-corps within their units, but to help identify unit equipment and baggage. The 81st Division, composed mostly of Southern inductees, first adopted the nickname "Stonewall Division" in honor of Confederate General Thomas "Stonewall" Jackson. While at Camp Jackson, much of the division training was conducted in the vicinity of Wildcat Creek. Furthermore, some more daring country boys in uniform trapped a Carolina wildcat (presumably a bobcat) near the creek, and adopted the snarling beast as the division mascot. For those reasons, the division adopted a wildcat as their unique insignia. The wildcat proved so popular with the members of the division that the "Stonewall" nickname was quickly supplanted. The cat symbol and the motto "Obedience, Courage, Loyalty" were officially adopted in the War Department General Order #16 of 24 May 1918.

The 81st Division commander, Major General Charles J. Bailey, went a step further in creating a distinctive shoulder patch for his men after seeing similar items in use by Allied troops on the Western Front. General Bailey canvassed his officers for thoughts on a divisional patch. Colonel Frank Halstead, commander of the 321st Infantry Regiment, logically proposed to use a wildcat as a symbol. Sergeant Dan Silverman, a soldier in the headquarters of the 321st Infantry, created several concept sketches for review by General Bailey. One of Silverman's sketches which showed a wildcat superimposed on a disk was selected for approval by General Bailey. Out of the concept sketch was created a circular olive drab cloth patch with a wildcat silhouette surrounded by a black border. To further differentiate the elements of the division, specific colors were assigned the subordinate brigades, support trains and separate battalions. For example, the divisional headquarters and headquarters troop adopted a black patch with a yellowish wildcat with the superimposed letters "HQ". On his own authority, Bailey authorized the creation and wear of the wildcat patches.

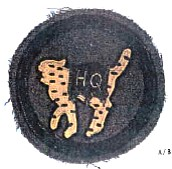
81st Division headquarters shoulder insignia circa 1918

The new wildcat insignia not only served as a ready means of identification, but helped to foster unit pride and esprit-de-corps. However, General Bailey quickly found himself in trouble over his unauthorized patch. When the 81st Division arrived in New York City to embark for Europe, the port commander not only ordered the removal of the patches, but cabled the War Department to report the breach of uniform regulations. By the time the War Department replied with orders to remove the patch, the 81st Division had already sailed from New York. Once at sea, General Bailey cheekily ordered his men to restore the wildcat patches to their uniforms.

However, the matter of the wildcat patch was not settled. As the 81st Division was moving into the Vosges sector of France, a War Department telegram arrived from the Adjutant General of the American Expeditionary Forces. The telegram frostily requested General Bailey to "furnish authority, if any, for wearing the "wildcat" in cloth on both the left sleeve and overseas cap...it is gathered that no previous authority was officially given to any organization for this addition to the uniform." Bailey redoubled his efforts to keep the insignia by sending an indorsement to General General John J. Pershing, commander of the American Expeditionary Force (A.E.F.), on 4 October 1918 advising that "no official sanction had been given for the wearing of the emblem on the uniform. Bailey continued by explaining in detail the events leading up to the adoption...of the distinguishing symbol in this manner and the advantages of the usage of such as symbol."

Determined to win the argument, Bailey obtained permission to personally defend his decision to Pershing. As the story goes, Bailey touted the advantages of a shoulder patch in boosting the morale of the soldiers. General Pershing approved the use of the patch, reportedly saying "all right, go ahead and wear it; and see to it that you live up to it."

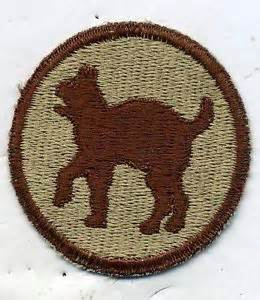
Desert version of the 81st "Wildcat" SSI

Bailey's initiative quickly spread among the A.E.F. On 18 October 1918, the commander of the First Army distributed an order from General Pershing that directed each division commander to submit a sleeve insignia design for review and approval. On 19 October, the 81st Division requested confirmation of their existing wildcat design, and received approval from the GHQ on the same day – thus confirming the 81st Division Wildcat patch as the first divisional patch of the Army. In 1922 the War Department approved the final version of the Wildcat patch, a black cat on an olive drab disc within a black circle, a design which has remained the same ever since – with one minor variation. When worn on the Desert Combat Uniform, the patch was tan and brown. In contrast to other Army organizations which displayed a colored patch on the old green dress uniform and a "subdued" patch for the field uniform, the 81st's wildcat insignia was the same regardless of uniform type. In 1967, a memo from the Adjutant General of the Army authorized the wearing of the 81st Infantry Division's patch by the 81st Army Reserve Command (ARCOM) of the United States Army Reserve. This authorization is extended today to the 81st Readiness Division (RD) currently located at Fort Jackson, South Carolina.

=== Interwar period ===
Following the adoption of the National Defense Act of 1920, the 81st Division was reconstituted in the Organized Reserve on 24 June 1921. Among the new division's units was its air squadron, the 306th Observation Squadron, constituted in the Organized Reserve (Tennessee) that same day. The division was allocated to the Fourth Corps Area, and assigned to the XIV Corps. The states of Tennessee and North Carolina became its home areas. The division headquarters was organized on 23 September 1921 at the Arnstein Building in Knoxville, Tennessee, and relocated in 1927 to the L.F.M. Building in Knoxville. It was again relocated in 1933 to the Post Office Building and remained there until activated for World War II. After activation, the division's recruiting efforts were such that by February 1924, the division was at 100 percent of its authorized strength. To maintain communications with the officers of the division, the division staff published a newsletter, “The Wildcat.” The newsletter informed the division's members of such things as when and where the inactive training sessions were to be held, what the division's summer training quotas were, where the camps were to be held, and which units would be assigned to help conduct the Citizens Military Training Camps.

The designated mobilization and training station for the division was Camp McClellan, Alabama, also the location where much of the division's training activities occurred in the interwar years. The division headquarters usually conducted its summer training there, and on a number of occasions, participated in command post exercises (CPXs). The 81st Division headquarters occasionally trained with the staff of the 8th Infantry Brigade, 4th Division. The infantry regiments of the division held their summer training primarily with the units of the 8th Infantry Brigade. Other units, such as the special troops, artillery, engineers, aviation, medical, and quartermaster, trained at various posts in the Fourth Corps Area usually with the active elements of the 4th Division or other Regular Army units. For example, the division's artillery trained with the units of the 13th Field Artillery Brigade at Fort Bragg, North Carolina; the 306th Engineer Regiment usually trained with Company A, 4th Engineer Regiment at Fort Benning, Georgia; the 306th Medical Regiment trained at the medical officers' training camp at Fort Oglethorpe, Georgia; and the 306th Observation Squadron trained with air corps units at Maxwell Field, Alabama. In addition to the unit training camps, the infantry regiments of the division rotated responsibility to conduct the CMTC training held at Camp McClellan each year. On a number of occasions, the division participated in Fourth Corps Area or Third Army CPXx in conjunction with other Regular Army, National Guard, and Organized Reserve units. These training events gave division staff officers opportunities to practice the roles they would be expected to perform in the event the division was mobilized.

Unlike the Regular and Guard units in the Third Corps Area, the 81st Division did not participate in the Fourth Corps Area maneuvers and the Third Army maneuvers of 1938, 1940, and 1941 as an organized unit due to lack of enlisted personnel and equipment. Instead, the officers and a few enlisted reservists were assigned to Regular and Guard units to fill vacant slots and bring the units up to war strength for the exercises. For the 1938 Third Army maneuver, for example, about 200 of the division's officers were attached to the 4th Division to allow that unit to function as an almost full-strength division. Additionally, some were assigned duties as umpires or as support personnel.

=== World War II ===
- Activated: 15 June 1942, Camp Rucker, Alabama.
- Overseas: 3 July 1944.
- Campaigns: Western Pacific, South Philippines.
- Days of combat: 166.
- Awards: DSC – 7; DSM – 2; SS – 281; LM – 7; SM – 40; BSM – 658; AM – 15.
- Commanders: Maj. Gen. Gustave H. Franke (June–August 1942), Maj. Gen. Paul J. Mueller (August 1942 to inactivation).
- Assistant Division Commander: Marcus B. Bell (January 1942 to inactivation)
- Inactivated: 30 January 1946 in Japan.

==== Mobilization ====
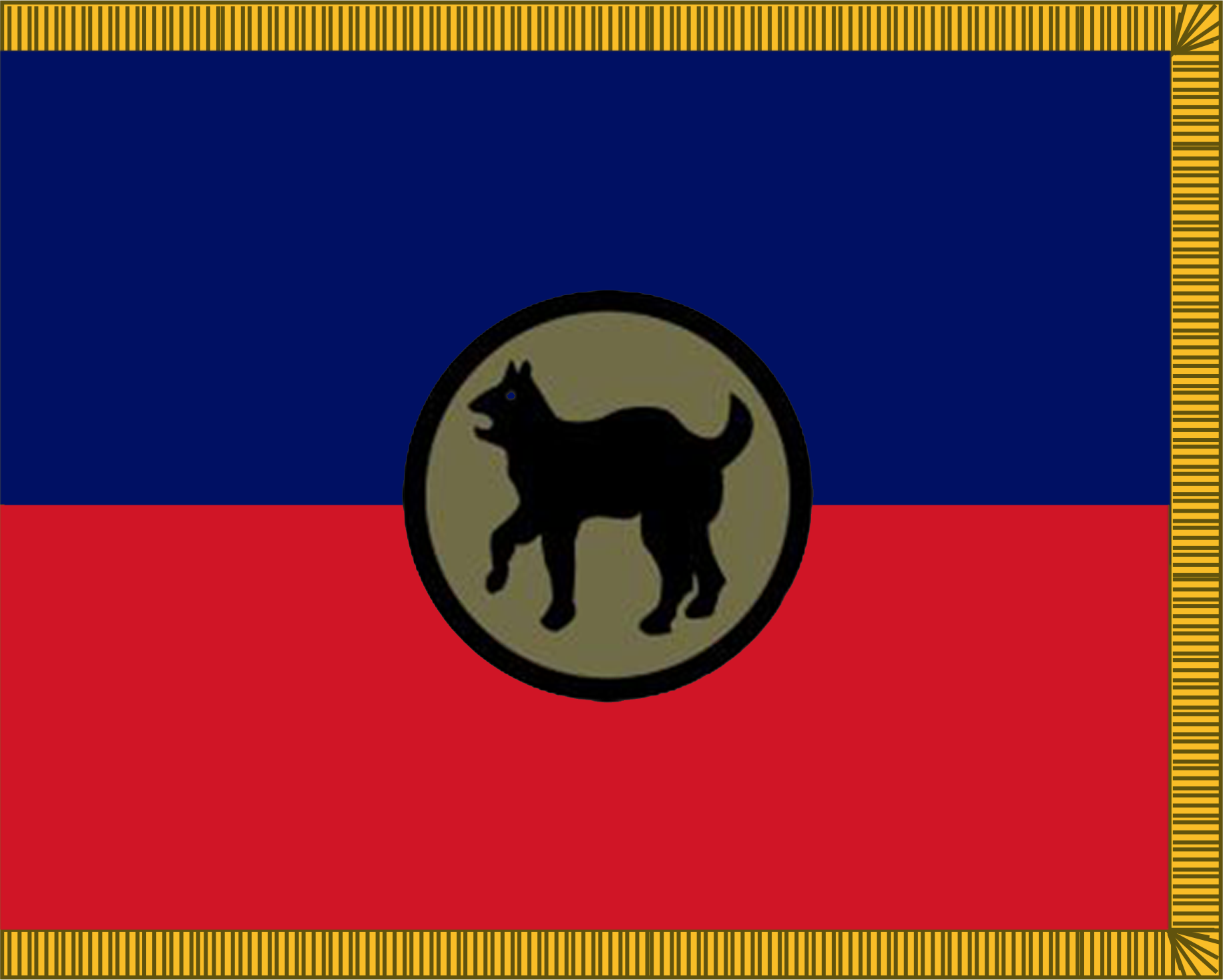
Flag of the United States Army 81st Infantry Division

Before Organized Reserve infantry divisions were ordered into active military service, they were reorganized on paper as "triangular" divisions under the 1940 tables of organization. The headquarters companies of the two infantry brigades were consolidated into the division's cavalry reconnaissance troop, and one infantry regiment was removed by inactivation. The field artillery brigade headquarters and headquarters battery became the headquarters and headquarters battery of the division artillery. Its three field artillery regiments were reorganized into four battalions; one battalion was taken from each of the two 75 mm gun regiments to form two 105 mm howitzer battalions, the brigade's ammunition train was reorganized as the third 105 mm howitzer battalion, and the 155 mm howitzer battalion was formed from the 155 mm howitzer regiment. The engineer, medical, and quartermaster regiments were reorganized into battalions. In 1942, divisional quartermaster battalions were split into ordnance light maintenance companies and quartermaster companies, and the division's headquarters and military police company, which had previously been a combined unit, was split.

==== Division organization ====
The division consisted of the following units:

81st Infantry Division organization (click to enlarge)

- 81st Infantry Division
  - 81st Infantry Division Headquarters
  - 81st Cavalry Reconnaissance Troop (Mechanized) (M3 scout cars and then M8 Greyhound armored cars)
  - 321st Infantry Regiment
    - Headquarters and Headquarters Company
    - 3× Infantry battalions
      - each battalion consists of: 1× Headquarters and Headquarters Company, 3× Rifle companies, 1× Heavy Weapons Company
    - Cannon Company (T12 Gun Motor Carriages and T19 Howitzer Motor Carriages, later replaced by either M3 105mm towed howitzers or M7 Priest self propelled howitzers)
    - Anti-Tank Company (M3 37mm anti-tank guns, which were replaced by 1944 with M1 57mm anti-tank guns)
    - Service Company
  - 322nd Infantry Regiment
    - same organization as 321st Infantry Regiment
  - 323rd Infantry Regiment
    - same organization as 321st Infantry Regiment
  - 81st Infantry Division Artillery
    - Headquarters and Headquarters Battery
    - 316th Field Artillery Battalion
      - Headquarters and Headquarters Battery
      - 3× Batteries (M2 105mm towed howitzers)
      - Service Battery
    - 317th Field Artillery Battalion
      - same organization as 316th Field Artillery Battalion
    - 318th Field Artillery Battalion
      - Headquarters and Headquarters Battery
      - 3× Batteries (M1 155mm towed howitzers)
      - Service Battery
    - 906th Field Artillery Battalion
      - same organization as 316th Field Artillery Battalion
  - Headquarters Special Troops
    - Headquarters Company, 81st Infantry Division
    - 81st Signal Company
    - 81st Quartermaster Company
    - 781st Ordnance Light Maintenance Company
    - Military Police Platoon
    - 81st Infantry Division Band (attached)
  - 306th Engineer Combat Battalion
    - Headquarters and Headquarters and Service Company
    - 3× Engineer combat companies
  - 306th Medical Battalion
    - Headquarters and Headquarters Detachment
    - 3× Collecting companies
    - Clearing Company

==== Combat chronicle ====
The 81st Infantry Division was ordered into active military service for World War II in June 1942 at Camp Rucker, Alabama. As in World War I, the division was filled primarily with inducted men. The division trained at locations in Tennessee, Arizona and California before embarking for Hawaii in June 1944. The 81st Infantry Division landed in Hawaii, 11 June–8 July 1944. After completion of amphibious and jungle training, the 81st Infantry Division departed for Guadalcanal in August 1944. There the division was attached to the III Marine Amphibious Corps reserve.

The division minus Regimental Combat Team (RCT) 323 invaded Angaur Island in the Palau group, as part of the Palau Islands campaign 17 September, and pushed through to the western shore in a quick movement, cutting the island in half. The enemy was driven into isolated pockets and mopping-up operations began on 20 September. RCT 321, attached to the 1st Marine Division, went into action on Peleliu Island in the Palaus and assisted in splitting defense forces and isolating them in mountainous areas in the central part of the island. The team aided in mopping up Ngesebus Island and capturing Kongauru and Garakayo Islands. RCT 323 under naval task force command occupied the Ulithi atoll, 21–23 September 1944. Elements of the team landed on Ngulu Atoll and destroyed enemy personnel and installations, 16 October, completing the outflanking of the enemy base at Yap. On 18 October, RCT 323 left to rejoin the 81st on Peleliu, which assumed command of all troops on that island and Angaur, 20 October 1944. Resistance was ended on Peleliu, 27 November. Between 4 November 1944 and 1 January 1945, the division seized Pulo Anna Island, Kyangel Atoll, and Pais Island. The 81st left in increments from 1 January to 8 February for New Caledonia for rehabilitation and training. The division arrived in Leyte on 17 May 1945, and after a period of training participated in mopping-up operations in the northwest part of the island, 21 July 1945 to 12 August 1945. After rest and training, the 81st moved to Japan, 18 September, and performed occupation duties in Aomori Prefecture until the 81st Infantry Division was inactivated in Japan on 30 January 1946.

==== Casualties ====
- Total battle casualties: 2,914
- Killed in action: 550
- Wounded in action: 2,462
- Missing in action: 6
- Non Combat Casualties: 2,461

=== Cold War ===
On 10 November 1947, the 81st Infantry Division was reconstituted in the Organized Reserve with the division headquarters in Atlanta, Georgia. Under War Department guidelines, the 81st was organized as a Class C reserve unit with 60% of the authorized officer cadre, but no authorized enlisted members. In the event of a wartime mobilization, the division would expand to wartime strength with called up reservists and new inductees. In 1952 the Organized Reserve became the United States Army Reserve. However, during the 1950s and 60s, the 81st Infantry Division was not called up for service during the Korean War or Berlin Crisis. As part of the 1962 reorganization of the reserve components initiated by Secretary of Defense Robert McNamara, the 81st Infantry Division was selected for inactivation, which was completed on 31 December 1965.

== Twenty-first century ==
In the mid-2020s the 81st Readiness Division is a subordinate geographic command of the United States Army Reserve Command. The division provides programs and services that enhance individual and unit readiness for mobilization and deployment of Army Reserve forces in the states of Alabama, Florida, Georgia, Kentucky, Louisiana, Mississippi, North Carolina, South Carolina, and Tennessee, and the territories of Puerto Rico and the U.S. Virgin Islands. As of December 2025 the division consists of the following units:

Its units include:

- 81st Readiness Division, at Fort Jackson (SC)
  - XVIII Airborne Corps Main Command Post — Operational Detachment (MCP-OD), at Fort Bragg (NC)

Public Affairs units:
- 314th Theater Public Affairs Support Element, in Birmingham (AL)
  - 107th Mobile Public Affairs Detachment, in St. Augustine (FL)
  - 204th Public Affairs Detachment, in Orlando (FL)
  - 209th Broadcast Operations Detachment, in Rome (GA)
  - 210th Mobile Public Affairs Detachment, in Cary (NC)
  - 215th Mobile Public Affairs Detachment, in New Orleans (LA)
  - 300th Mobile Public Affairs Detachment, at Fort Gillem (GA)
  - 319th Mobile Public Affairs Detachment, at Fort Jackson (SC)
  - 340th Public Affairs Detachment, in Millington (TN)
  - 372nd Mobile Public Affairs Detachment, in Nashville (TN)

Military History Detachments:
- 20th Military History Detachment, in Chattanooga (TN)
- 23rd Military History Detachment, in Chattanooga (TN)
- 28th Military History Detachment, in Aiken (SC)
- 45th Military History Detachment, in Aiken (SC)
- 46th Military History Detachment, in Birmingham (AL)
- 54th Military History Detachment, in Birmingham (AL)
- 317th Military History Detachment, in Aiken (SC)
- 322nd Military History Detachment, in Birmingham (AL)

Chaplain Detachments
- 90th Chaplain Detachment, in Decatur (GA)
- 91st Chaplain Detachment, in Orlando (FL)
- 92nd Chaplain Detachment, in Panama City (FL)
- 94th Chaplain Detachment, in East Point (GA)
- 100th Chaplain Detachment, in Knightdale (NC)
- 101st Chaplain Detachment, in New Orleans (LA)
- 102nd Chaplain Detachment, in New Orleans (LA)
- 103rd Chaplain Detachment, in St. Petersburg (FL)
- 104th Chaplain Detachment, in Fort Jackson (SC)
- 106th Chaplain Detachment, in Knightdale (NC)
- 108th Chaplain Detachment, at Joint Base Charleston (SC)
- 109th Chaplain Detachment, in Cary (NC)
- 110th Chaplain Detachment, in Birmingham (AL)
- 111th Chaplain Detachment, in Fort Bragg (NC)
- 113th Chaplain Detachment, in New Orleans (LA)
- 115th Chaplain Detachment, in Orlando (FL)
- 119th Chaplain Detachment, in St. Petersburg (FL)
- 128th Chaplain Detachment, in Nashville (TN)
- 132nd Chaplain Detachment, in Paducah (KY)
- 140th Chaplain Detachment, in Knightdale (NC)
- 143rd Chaplain Detachment, at Joint Base Charleston (SC)

Army Bands:
- 100th Army Band, in Fort Knox (KY)
- 208th Army Band, in Concord (NC)
- 313th Army Band, at Redstone Arsenal (AL)

== See also ==
- Action at Anguar
- Paul W. Baade, served with the 81st Division in World War I and later commanded the 35th Infantry Division in World War II
- William C. Lee, served with the 81st Division in World War I and later commanded the 101st Airborne Division in World War II
- William B. Umstead, served as an officer with the 81st in World War I
