= 1915 Detroit Heralds season =

Sports season

- Head coach: Bill Marshall
- Home stadium: Packard Park

Results
- Record: 7–1–1

The 1915 Detroit Heralds season was the 11th season for the Detroit Heralds, an independent American football team. Led by coach Bill Marshall, the team compiled a 7–1–1 record.

Blake Miller and Neno DaPrato, college stars at Michigan Agricultural College (MAC), joined the Heralds after MAC's season concluded in mid-November.

== Schedule ==
Date	Opponent	Site	Result	Attendance	Source
October 3	Cleveland Erin Braus	Packard Park; Detroit	W 34–0		
October 17	Cincinnati Celts	Packard Park; Detroit	W 12–6		
October 24	Canton	Packard Park; Detroit	W 9–3		
October 31	Evanston North Ends	Packard Park; Detroit	L 0–6		
November 7	Lancaster	Packard Park; Detroit	T 0–0		
November 14	Buffalo	Packard Park; Detroit	W 69–0		
November 21	at Mack Park Maroons	Mack Park; Detroit	W 9–7	8,000	
November 25	Greys	Packard Park; Detroit	W 14–0		
November 28	Ann Arbor Independents	Packard Park; Detroit	W 6–0		

== Players ==
- Neno DaPrato - halfback
- Pat Dunne - fullback
- Norm Glockson - end
- Kelly - halfback
- Latham - quarterback
- Blake Miller - end
- Mitchell - guard
- Nedeau - end
- Newashe - guard
- Pierce - guard
- H. Schlee - tackle
- G. Shields - tackle
- R. "Dick" Shields - end and captain
- Archie "Dutch" Stewart - center
- Perce Wilson - halfback/quarterback
