= 1915 Columbus Panhandles season =

American football team season

- Head coach: Joseph F. Carr
- Home stadium: Indianola Park

Results
- Record: 8–3–1

The 1915 Columbus Panhandles season was their tenth season in existence. The team played in the Ohio League and posted an 8–3–1 record.

== Schedule ==
Game	Date	Opponent	Result
1	September 26, 1915	Columbus Soderbloom Smokers	W 40–0
2	October 3, 1915	Columbus All-Stars	W 29–0
3	October 10, 1915	at Marion Questions	W 21–0
4	October 17, 1915	Canton Bulldogs	L 7–0
5	October 24, 1915	at Toledo Maroons	L 20–0
6	October 31, 1915	at Massillon Tigers	W 16–0
7	November 7, 1915	at Dayton Gym-Cadets	W 24–7
8	November 14, 1915	at Detroit Mack Park Maroons	W 7–0
9	November 21, 1915	at Youngstown Patricians	T 0–0
10	November 25, 1915	at Fort Wayne Friars	L 3–0
11	November 28, 1915	at Columbus Barracks	W 26–0
12	December 5, 1915	at Ohio All-Stars	W 13–0
