= 1915 Dayton Gym-Cadets season =

American football team season

- Head coach: Al Mahrt
- Home stadium: Westwood Field

Results
- Record: 7–1–1

The 1915 Dayton Gym-Cadets season was their third season in the Ohio League. The team changed its name this season from the St. Mary's Cadets to the Dayton Gym-Cadets, after their presumed sponsors, the Dayton Gymnastic Club. The team posted a 7–1–1 record.

== Schedule ==
| Game | Date | Opponent | Result |
|---|---|---|---|
| 1 | October 10, 1915 | Cincinnati Valley Athletic Club | W 50-0 |
| 2 | October 17, 1915 | at North Cincinnati Athletic Club | W 33-7 |
| 3 | October 24, 1915 | at Cincinnati Celts | T 0-0 |
| 4 | October 22, 1915 | at Toledo Maroons | W 20-7 |
| 5 | November 7, 1915 | Columbus Panhandles | L 24-7 |
| 6 | November 14, 1915 | Akron Indians | W 39-0 |
| 7 | November 21, 1916 | Dayton Miamis | W 48-0 |
| 8 | November 25, 1916 | West Carrollton Paper Mill | W 20-0 |
| 9 | November 28, 1916 | Dayton Wolverines | W 20-0 |

== roster ==
Herb Allen HB

Bucher HB

Burns G

Foos Clark G-T

Craig HB

Pie Decker FB

Larry Dellinger G-T

Gebhart HB

Bob Gregor T-G

Herbig T-G

George Kinderdine C

Harry Kinderdine E

Al Mahrt QB

Miller E

Lou Partlow HB

Jack Redmond E

Rodgers T

Norb Sacksteder HB

Bill Sherry QB

Carl Storck HB

Walters T-FB-HB

Weaver E

Wenger C

Wentz T-G

Billy Zile E-HB

George Zimmerman HB-FB
