= 1915 Akron Indians season =

American football team season

Results
- Record: 1–3–1
- Division place: No divisions
- Playoffs: No playoffs

The 1915 Akron Indians season was their eight season in existence. The team played in the Ohio League and posted a 1–3–1 record.

== Schedule ==
The table below was compiled using the information from The Pro Football Archives, which used various contemporary newspapers. For the results column, the winning team's score is posted first followed by the result for the Indians. If a cell is greyed out and has "N/A", then that means there is an unknown figure for that game. Green-colored rows indicate a win; yellow-colored rows indicate a tie; and red-colored rows indicate a loss.

Week	Date	Opponent	Result	Record	Venue	Attendance
1	October 10	Canton Bakos	W 26–3	1–0	—	—
2	November 7	at Toledo Maroons	L 0–10	1–1	Armory Park	2,600
3	November 14	at Dayton Gym-Cadets	L 0–39	1–2	Westwood Field	—
4	November 25	at Marion Questions	L 7–18	1–3	Lincoln Park	300
5	November 28	vs. Columbus Bates Pirates	T 0–0	1–3–1	—	—
