= Gustave H. Franke =

United States Army general (1888–1953)

Gustav Henry Franke
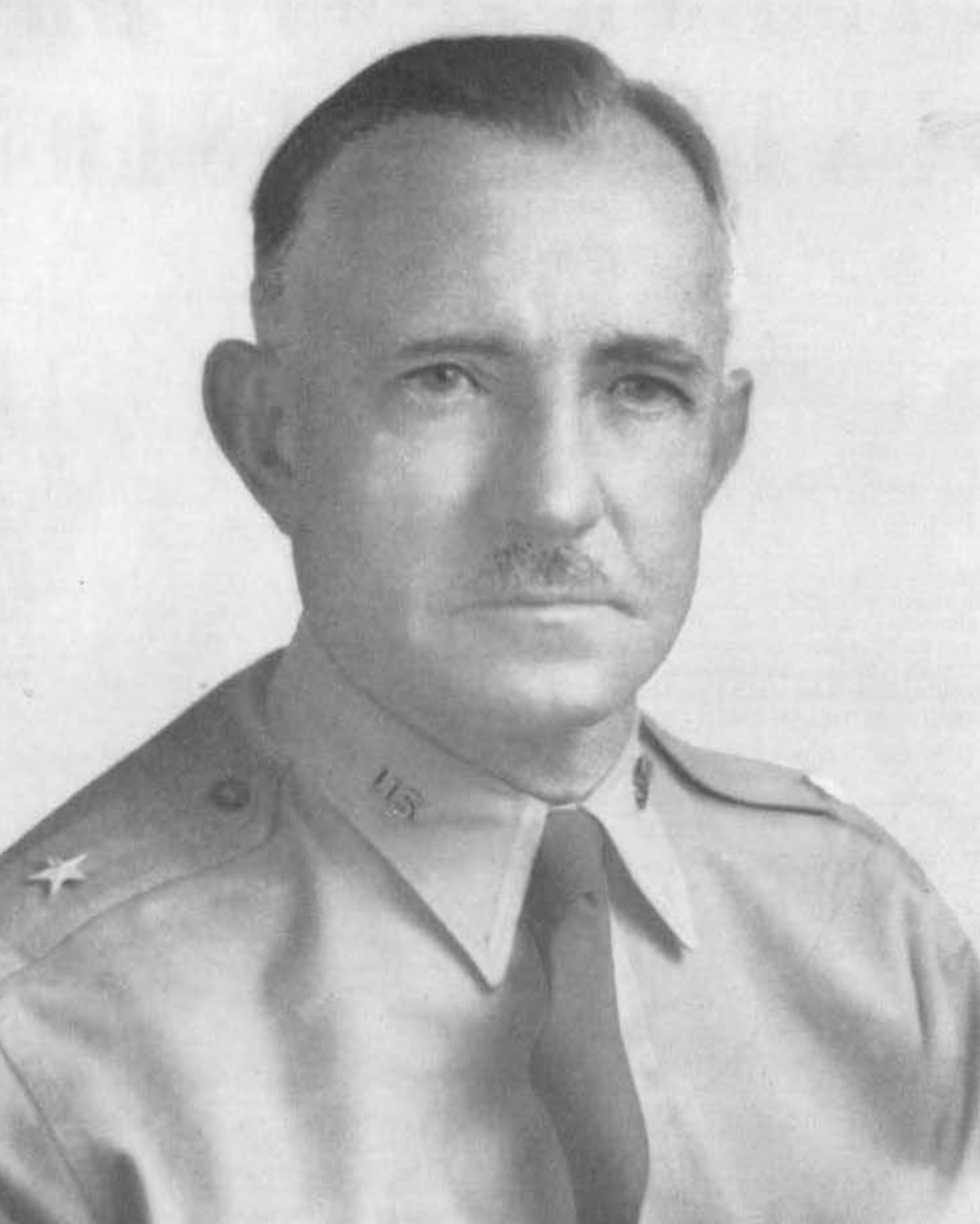
- Franke as 6th Infantry Division Artillery commander c. 1941
- Born: September 7, 1888; Wisconsin, United States
- Died: March 19, 1953 (aged 64)
- Military career
- Allegiance: United States
- Branch: United States Army
- Service years: 1912−1944
- Rank: Major General
- Nickname: "Gus"
- Unit: Field Artillery Branch
- Commands: 1st Battalion, 2nd Field Artillery Regiment; 81st Infantry Division
- Conflicts: World War I World War II

Major General Gustav Henry "Gus" Franke (September 7, 1888 – March 19, 1953) was a career United States Army officer, who served during World Wars I and II.

== Biography ==
Gustav H. Franke was born in Wisconsin and moved to Iowa on September 7, 1888. His father, Gustave Henry Franke, was a tailor in Manning, Iowa.

"Gus" Franke was an honors graduate of the United States Military Academy, class of 1911. He graduated 12th in a class of 83. One of Franke's classmates at West Point was future general Terry Allen, until Allen's academic difficulties led to his dismissal from the military academy. Another distinguished classmate was Walton Walker, who would rise to Lieutenant General and command the Eighth Army in Korea during the desperate times of 1950.

Franke served much of his career in the Field Artillery Branch. Franke was commander of the first US unit (Artillery) to engage the Germany Army in World War I as the American forces moved forward. In the years leading up to World War II, Franke was the commanding officer of the 2nd Field Artillery Regiment from 1937 to 1940. He moved to Commandant of the Field Artillery Replacement Center at Fort Bragg in 1941. From 1941 to 1942, Franke was the commanding officer of Artillery for the 6th Infantry Division.

With the advent of the United States involvement in World War II, General Franke became the commander of the 81st Infantry Division at Fort Rucker, Alabama, from its reactivation in June 1942 until August 1942. During this time Gen. Franke was responsible for the construction and establishment of Ft. Rucker as a major facility as the home and training center for the 81st Infantry Division. He was succeeded at the 81st by Major General Paul J. Mueller.

During the summer of 1943 Franke became ill and was hospitalized for several months in Atlanta, Georgia.

Franke was a member of the War Department Dependency Board from 1943 to 1944.

Major General Franke retired from the Army in 1944.

His son, Gustav H. Franke Jr., was also an army officer and served in World War II and the Korean War where he was awarded a Silver Star. Like his father, he was a career artillery officer, eventually retiring from the Army in 1965. After he completed courses at Duke University, he became a professor at Hampden-Sydney College in Virginia. He also had a son that followed in his grandfather and father's steps. Gustav W. Franke served as an Army Aviator and Engineer officer. He was awarded the Distinguished Flying Cross during the Vietnam War. Later in his career he headed up the United States Department of Defense Key Asset Protection Program during the First Gulf War and retired in 1996 as a colonel.

Military offices
Preceded by Newly activated organization	Commanding General 81st Infantry Division; June–August 1942	Succeeded by Paul J. Mueller
