= Jack Cusack =

American professional football manager (1890–1973)

Profile
- Position: Manager

Personal information
- Born: November 17, 1890; Canton, Ohio, U.S.
- Died: 1973

Career information
- College: None

Career history

manager
- 1912–1915: Canton Professionals
- 1915–1918: Canton Bulldogs
- 1922: Cleveland Tigers

Awards and highlights
- 3× Ohio League champion (1915, 1916, 1917); Ohio League runner-up (1914); Signed Jim Thorpe to Canton (1915)

Jack Cusack (November 17, 1890 – 1973) was an American professional football manager in the Ohio League. He served as the manager and owner of the Canton Bulldogs from 1912 to 1918. During his six years with the Canton Bulldogs, Cusack led the team to Ohio League championships in 1916 and 1917, and was responsible for bringing Jim Thorpe into professional football. Cusack also is responsible for helping revive the Bulldogs following the Canton Bulldogs-Massillon Tigers Betting Scandal, which eroded public support for the game from 1906 until 1911. He also ensured that the Bulldogs had a sturdy financial foundation for when they would later enter the National Football League (NFL). In 1918, Cusack left football to enter the oil and gasoline business in Oklahoma. He later worked as an independent oil operator in Fort Worth, Texas.

== Early life and the Bulldogs betting scandal ==
Cusack developed a love for professional football during the early days of the Canton Bulldogs franchise, then headed up by Blondy Wallace. In 1906 though the Bulldogs were accused of throwing a game to rival Massillon Tigers. Making one of the earliest accusations was Victor Kaufmann, who had lost a heavy bet on the disputed contest. Right after the Bulldogs returned to Canton, the day of the 13–6 loss to Massillion, Kaufmann and Cusack went to the Courtland Hotel Bar, where most of the Bulldogs had congregated to post-mortem the game. There a fight broke out after Kaufman accused the Bulldogs of throwing the game. The fight engulfed the whole bar and police had to be called in. Kauffman and Cusack escaped the bar, before the police showed up. In his book, "A Pioneer in Pro Football", Cusack still believed, years later, that the Bulldogs and Wallace threw the game.

== Pro football ==
A Canton team was organized in 1912, with all games held at League Park, owned by Ed Piero and Dr. Lothamer. The new organization was called the Canton Professionals for fears that the old Bulldog name would bring back memories of the 1906 scandal. In 1912 this time, at the age of 21, Cusack became the team's secretary-treasurer, at no cost to the team, as a favor to Roscoe Oberlin. However Cusack was disliked by the current Professionals manager H.H. Halter. Cusack later went behind Halter's back to sign a contract with Peggy Parrett's Akron Indians, concerning conditions for a match between the two squads, something Halter was unable to do. When Cusack's actions were discovered by Halter, he tried to dispose of Cusack's services through a team meeting. However, during the meeting the team sided Cusack, after discovering that he had secured a 5-year lease on League Park for the Pros. The result was Halter being removed from the team, and Cusack being named the team's new manager.

As manager of the Pros, Cusack slowly added star college players to his roster along with the local sandlotters who constituted the bulk of the team. To make the team more profitable he had 1,500 seats added to League Park. Cusack felt that the Pros had to live down the 1906 scandal and gain the public's confidence in the honesty of the game. It was his theory that if he could stop players from jumping from one team to another, it would be a first step in the right direction. Therefore, the managers made a verbal agreement that once a player signed with a team he was that team's property as long as he played, or until he was released by management. Finally Cusack revived the Canton-Massillon rivalry in 1915. With the rivalry, fans began referring to Canton as the "Bulldogs" again. Soon afterwards Cusack reinstated the team's former name.

== Signing Thorpe ==
Just before Canton's first game with the newly revived Massillon Tigers, Cusack signing the Jim Thorpe, the Sac and Fox Indian from Oklahoma who was then rated as the world's greatest football player, and all-around athlete. He had Thorpe under contract to play for Canton for $250 a game. Thorpe ended up being a huge draw for Canton bringing record numbers of fans to the games. Canton lost the first game to the Tigers 16–0, however they won the second game 6–0.

Under Cusack the Bulldogs won the 1916 and 1917 Ohio League Championships. Even with World War I taking place, Canton still had a tough team. However, with more players going into the armed forces, football came to a halt until after the Armistice, in November 1918.

== Oil Business ==
After leaving high school in 1907, Cusack went to work as an office employee for the East Ohio Gas Company, a subsidiary of the Standard Oil. When professional football took a hiatus for World War I, Cusack returned to the oil business in Oklahoma. In the spring of 1919 he received a letter from Ralph Hay stating that he would like to carry on with the team if he was not returning. Hay, who was a very good friend of both Thorpe and Cusack, was acquainted with most of our 1916 and 1917 players, and therefore was in position to organize a team from that foundation. Cusack decided to let Hay go ahead rather than withdraw from his oil operations, and so he transferred the lease on League Park to Hay.

== Back to football ==
In 1921, Cusack left Arkansas, after contracting malaria, for Canton. There met up with Thorpe, who was now playing for the Cleveland Tigers. He hired Cusack to look after his personnel affairs as he felt that he was not receiving his full amount of gate money owed to him. He later found out that when Cleveland played in a baseball venue, the stadium personnel would take a larger cut for themselves and leave the rest for the players. He also found out that over 800-900 complimentary tickets were given out per contest, far above the allowable amount. Cusack soon found himself collecting all of the monies due to every Tigers player. Even when the treasurer of the Tigers tried to run off with over $3,750 owed to the team, Cusack and Thorpe tracked him down and returned the money to the players. He soon became the manager for the Tigers for two games before quitting in 1922. Cusack later became an independent oil operator living in Fort Worth, Texas.

Preceded by Canton Athletic Association	Owner of the Canton Bulldogs; 1912–1918	Succeeded by Ralph Hay
