= Paul J. Mueller =

US Army general

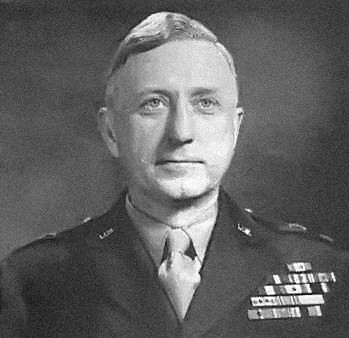
- Born: November 16, 1892; Union, Missouri, United States
- Died: September 25, 1964 (aged 71); Washington, D.C., United States
- Burial place: Arlington National Cemetery, Virginia, United States
- Military career
- Allegiance: United States
- Branch: United States Army
- Service years: 1915–1954
- Rank: Major General
- Service number: 0-3808
- Unit: Infantry Branch
- Commands: 1st Battalion, 64th Infantry Regiment; 2nd Battalion, 29th Infantry Regiment; 81st Infantry Division; 86th Infantry Division
- Conflicts: World War I World War II
- Awards: Navy Distinguished Service Medal; Army Distinguished Service Medal (2); Silver Star (2)

Major General Paul John Mueller (November 16, 1892 – September 25, 1964) was a highly decorated senior United States Army officer. He served overseas during World War I and World War II, where he commanded the 81st Infantry Division in the Pacific War. He was part of "the class the stars fell on".

== Biography ==
=== Early life and military career ===
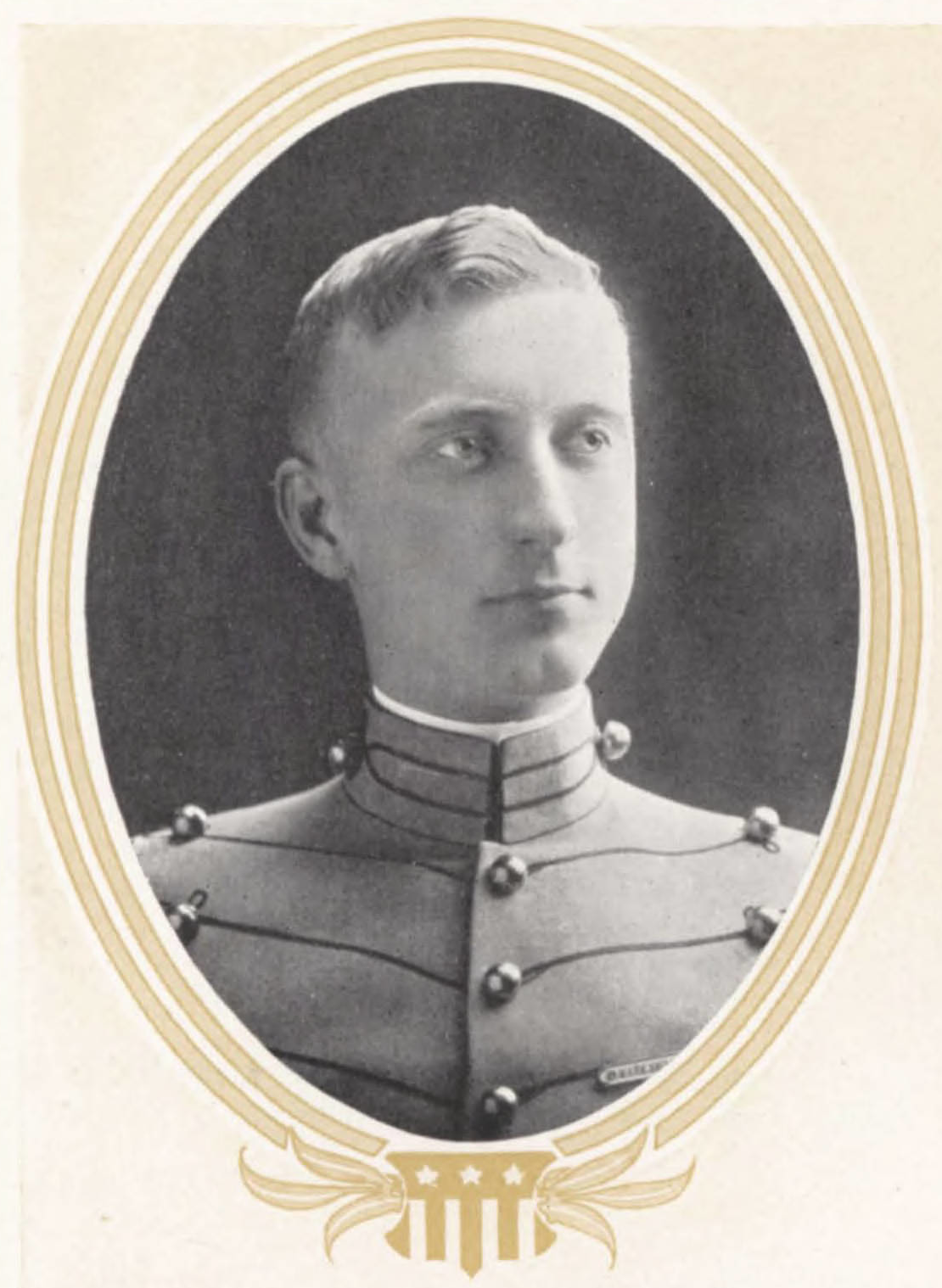
At West Point in 1915

Mueller was born on November 16, 1892, in Union, Missouri, and after attending the high school, he enrolled at the United States Military Academy (USMA) at West Point, New York, in June 1911. He graduated 45th of 164 from the USMA four years later, in June 1915 together with other future generals as Dwight D. Eisenhower, Omar Bradley, James Van Fleet, Henry Aurand and Stafford LeRoy Irwin (Mueller's class has been referred to by historians as "the class the stars fell on").

He was commissioned as a second lieutenant into the Infantry Branch of the United States Army on that date. His first assignment was with the 21st Infantry Regiment, then stationed at Vancouver Barracks, Washington. He subsequently served with his regiment in San Diego, California and also participated in border patrol duty near Nogales, Arizona.

With the American entry into World War I, which occurred on April 6, 1917, Mueller was appointed a camp instructor at the Presidio of San Francisco. He was transferred to the 64th Infantry Regiment, part of the 13th Brigade of the 7th Division, at Fort Bliss, Texas for preparing to transfer to the main theater of war on the Western Front.

With the arrival to the Western Front in June 1918, Mueller was promoted, at the age of 25, to the rank of major and appointed as commanding officer (CO) of the 1st Battalion of his regiment. He commanded the battalion during combat in Marbache Sector near the Moselle River. Mueller was also decorated with the Silver Star for bravery in action near the Bois de Puvenelle, October 10, 1918.

=== Between the wars ===
After World War I came to an end, on November 11, 1918, just five days before his 26th birthday, he returned with his regiment back to the United States in June 1919 and held numerous assignments to infantry commands, held staff positions and attended schools. Returning to Europe for a second time, he was a member of the occupation army stationed in Koblenz, Germany from 1920 to 1922. Returning again to the United States, he attended and graduated from the U.S. Army Command and General Staff School at Fort Leavenworth, Kansas in 1923. While he was there he met his wife, Margaret Martin Brown, and married her in the Fort Leavenworth Chapel on June 20, 1923. Soon afterwards he was assigned to the Historical Section of the U.S. Army War College. He later attended and graduated from the U.S. Army War College in 1928 and took part in a short course at the U.S. Army Chemical Warfare School.

He was then stationed with the 38th Infantry Regiment at Fort Douglas, Utah, until July 1930. From 1931 to 1934 he served with the War Plans Division on the General Staff of the War Department. In 1934 he joined the 29th Infantry Regiment, then serving at Fort Benning, Georgia and commanded the 2nd Battalion, later becoming regimental plans and training officer. By now a lieutenant colonel, his next assignment was as an instructor with the U.S. Army Command and General Staff School from 1935 to 1940. He led the training division from 1940 to 1941, during World War II (although the United States was still neutral at this point), for the chief of the infantry command. In October 1941, now a full colonel, he was assigned as chief of staff for the Headquarters of the U.S. Second Army at Memphis, Tennessee, under Lieutenant General Ben Lear. He was soon promoted to the one-star general officer rank of brigadier general.

=== World War II ===
In August 1942, several months after the United States entered World War II, Mueller was given command of the 81st Infantry Division at Camp Rucker, Alabama, and was soon promoted to the two-star rank of major general. The 81st, known as the Wildcat Division, had been commanded by Major General Gustave H. Franke since its reactivation in June 1942. His Assistant Division Commander(ADC) was initially Brigadier General William R. Schmidt. For the next two years Mueller moved the division to different training locations throughout the United States before it was deployed overseas to the Pacific in the summer of 1944.

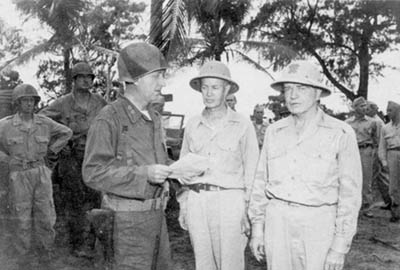
Major General Mueller welcomes Admiral William Halsey Jr. to Angaur after the occupation, 1945.

Mueller led the 81st Infantry Division into its first combat on September 17, 1944, during the Palau Islands campaign. While the majority of the 81st Division invaded Angaur Island, the 321st Regimental Combat Team (321st RCT) joined the 1st Marine Division in its assault of Peleliu Island. The 321st RCT also assisted in capturing Ngesebus Island, Kongauru and Garakayo Islands. Operating under a naval task force, the 323rd RCT occupied Ulithi Atoll. He was awarded the Navy Distinguished Service Medal for this campaign. The medal's citation reads:

The President of the United States of America takes pleasure in presenting the Navy Distinguished Service Medal to Major General Paul John Mueller (ASN: 0-3808), United States Army, for exceptionally meritorious and distinguished service in a position of great responsibility to the Government of the United States during the attack on Angaur, Palau Islands, from 17 September 1944 to 14 October 1944. Major General Mueller, as Commanding General of the 81st Infantry Division, demonstrated outstanding leadership and professional ability in executing a landing against an island highly prized by the Japanese. Confronted initially by difficult beaches and jungle growth, General Mueller skillfully maneuvered his command with such professional ability that he was able to launch an aggressive assault and drive the island's defenders into a single pocket of resistance on the coast. After the enemy was driven back to his prepared positions, General Mueller directed a succession of assaults which steadily reduced the hostile position. In maneuvering thus, he was confronted with extremely difficult terrain consisting of low hills and ridges, sharp coral pinnacles, and caves, with no roads giving access thereto. The enemy resisted desperately and General Mueller repeatedly occupied forward positions in order to better direct his forces. Concurrently, he had the responsibility of initiating development of an air base and was handicapped by unfavorable unloading and beach conditions. He commanded his division in a cool, courageous manner and demonstrated his ability as an outstanding leader. Prior to the operation he organized the reinforced division, supervised and coordinated its training, and perfected it for combat.

Beginning in November 1944 and continuing into the new year, Major General Mueller and the 81st Division captured Pulo Anna Island, Kyangel Atoll, and Pais Island.

After a break for rehabilitation and training, Mueller led the 81st to Leyte in May 1945 where they helped with mopping up operations until August 12, 1945. On September 18, Major General Mueller began occupation duty with the 81st Division in Japan.

=== Postwar ===
In January 1946, after the war ended, the 81st Division was deactivated and Mueller took over command of the 86th Infantry Division from January 1946 to April 1946, replacing Major General Harris M. Melasky. Major General Mueller commanded the 86th for a short time until relinquishing command to Major General Harry Hazlett.

After leaving the 86th Division, Mueller served as Chief of Staff to the Supreme Commander for the Allied Powers in Tokyo, Japan until 1949. Following this assignment he became the Deputy Commander of the Third Army from 1949 to 1950.

His next assignment was as head of the Career Management Division. He continued in this assignment until his retirement from the army in September 1954, after almost 40 years. He died of a heart attack at his home in Washington, D.C., on September 25, 1964, and was buried at Arlington National Cemetery.

== Decorations ==
Major General Paul J. Mueller's ribbon rack:

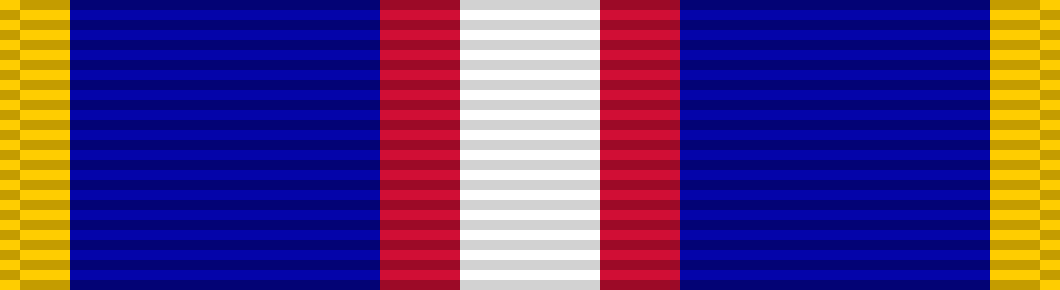

1st row	Army Distinguished Service Medal with 1 Oak leaf cluster	Navy Distinguished Service Medal	Silver Star with 1 Oak leaf cluster
2nd row	Army Commendation Medal with 1 Oak leaf cluster	Mexican Border Service Medal	World War I Victory Medal with 1 Campaign clasp
3rd row	Army of Occupation of Germany Medal	American Defense Service Medal	American Campaign Medal
4th row	Asiatic-Pacific Campaign Medal with Arrowhead Device and 3 Campaign stars	World War II Victory Medal	Army of Occupation Medal with 'Japan' Clasp
5th row	National Defense Service Medal	Philippine Liberation Medal with 1 Campaign star	Philippine Independence Medal
Unit awards	Philippine Presidential Unit Citation		

Legion of Honour Officer grade	Philippine Legion of Honor Grace Commander

== Bibliography ==
- Tucker, Spencer (2001). Who's who in Twentieth Century Warfare. Routledge. ISBN 978-0-415-23497-9.
- Gayle, Gordon D. (1996). Bloody Beaches: The Marines at Peleliu. Washington, D.C.: Marine Corps Historical Center. ISBN 978-0-7881-3781-5. PCN 190 003137 00. (HTML format)

Military offices
Preceded by Gustave H. Franke	Commanding General 81st Infantry Division; 1942–1945	Succeeded by Post deactivated
Preceded by Harris M. Melasky	Commanding General 86th Infantry Division; January–April 1946	Succeeded by Harry Hazlett
