= Harry Hazlett =

United States Army general

Profile
- Position: Head Coach

Personal information
- Born: April 17, 1884; Deersville, Ohio, United States
- Died: September 27, 1960 (aged 76); California, United States

Career history
- 1913–1915: Canton Bulldogs
- 1909–1915: Canton-McKinley Football
- 1906–1916: Canton-McKinley Basketball

Awards and highlights
- Professional coaching record: 17-4-2; High School football coaching record: 37-26-1; High school basketball coaching record: 89–49

Other information
- Military career
- Allegiance: United States
- Branch: U.S. Army
- Service years: 1916–1947
- Rank: Major General
- Unit: 86th Infantry Division
- Conflicts: Mexican Expedition; World War I; World War II
- Awards: Belgian Croix de Guerre; Distinguished Service Medal

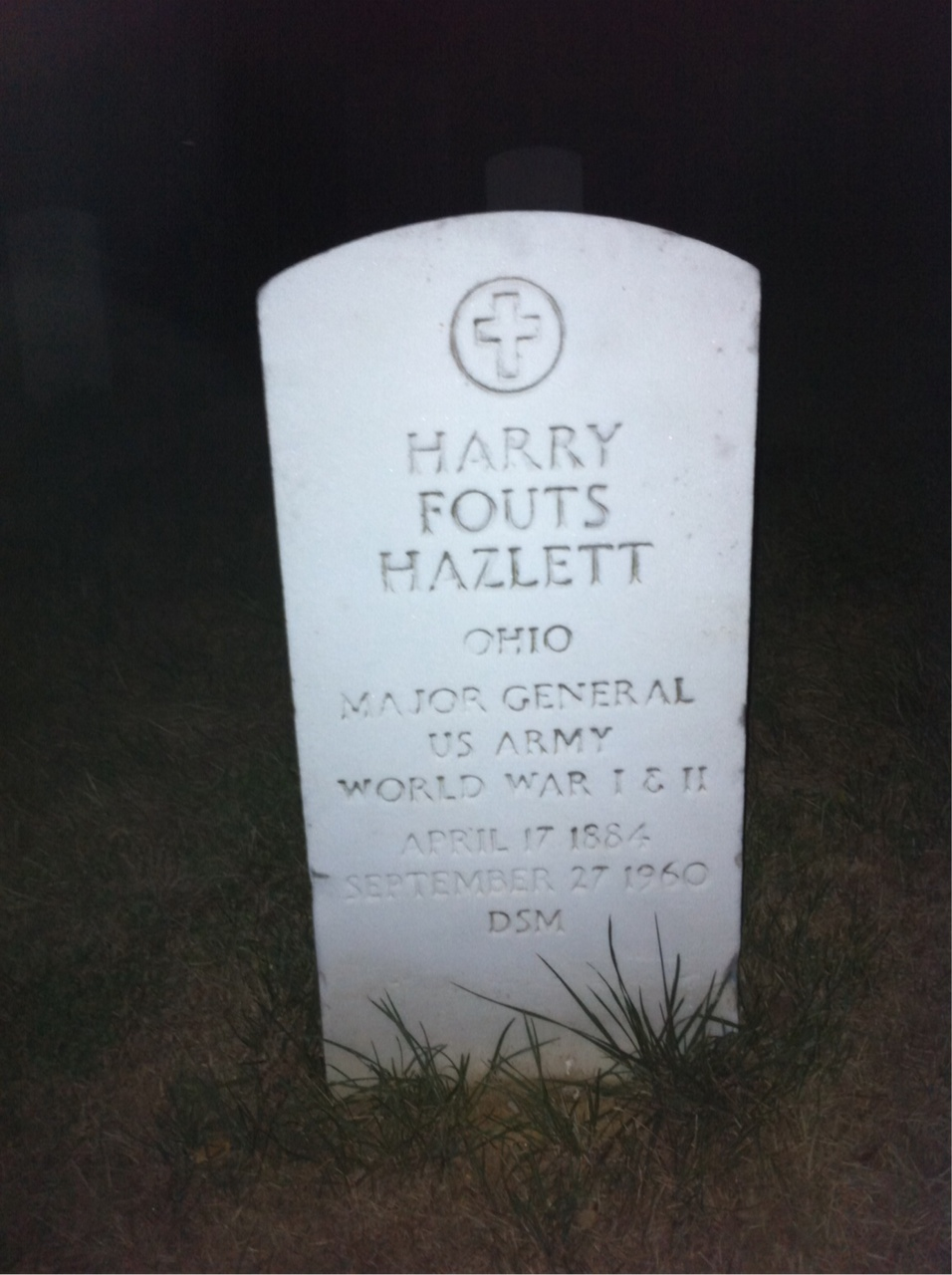
Grave of Harry Hazlett at Arlington National Cemetery.

Harry Fouts Hazlett (April 17, 1884 – September 27, 1960) was a career officer in the U.S. Army. Prior to that he was an American football coach for the Canton Professionals-Bulldogs of the "Ohio League", which was the direct predecessor to the modern National Football League. He was also the head football and basketball coach at Canton McKinley High School, Ohio.He was fired as the head coach of the Canton Bulldogs, by manager Jack Cusack, after he benched Canton rookie Jim Thorpe for the first game of the 1915 league title game. The first game in the two-game series resulted in a 16–0 victory over the Bulldogs by their rivals, the Massillon Tigers. It is unknown why Hazlett benched Thorpe. After Hazlett was fired, the Bulldogs' quarterback, Don Hamilton,left the team in protest. Thorpe was later named the team's new head coach and led the Bulldogs to the 1915 championship, which was split between Canton and Massillon.

== Biography ==
Hazlett joined the Ohio National Guard as a captain in 1916 and participated in the Mexican Expedition. During World War I, he served as a machine gun officer and was cited for bravery. After the war, he taught at the University of Akron and the University of Dayton as a professor of Military Science and Tactics. Before World War II, Hazlett attended the Army War College and published a paper, Procurement and Processing during the Voluntary Enlistment Period of Initial Mobilization, in 1933. Then Lt. Colonel Hazlett served as an instructor at the Army Command and General Staff School at Fort Leavenworth from 1935 to 1936.

During 1945, Hazlett served as Commanding General of the Replacement and School Command. In June 1946, he succeeded Major General Paul J. Mueller as commander of the 86th Infantry Division. He commanded the division until it was deactivated in December 1946 on Leyte, Philippines. After commanding the 86th, he was the Post Commander at Yokohama, Japan until 1947.

In retirement Hazlett lived in California. He is buried in Arlington National Cemetery.

Military offices
Preceded by Paul J. Mueller	Commanding General 86th Infantry Division; June−December 1946	Succeeded by Post deactivated
