= Phil Draper =

American football player (1875–1945)

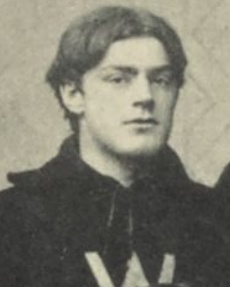
- Draper as a freshman at Williams, 1894

Profile
- Positions: Halfback, Fullback

Personal information
- Born: April 3, 1875; Troy, New York, U.S.
- Died: September 28, 1945 (aged 70); The Bronx, New York, U.S.
- Listed height: 5 ft 10 in (1.78 m)
- Listed weight: 195 lb (88 kg)

Career information
- College: Williams

Career history
- Troy Laureates (1891–1892); Bridgeport YMCA (1893); Williams (1894–1895); Troy Laureates (1896); Chicago Athletic Association (1896–1897); Troy Laureates (1898–1901); Watertown Red & Black (1902); All-Syracuse (1902); Watertown Red & Black (1903)

Awards and highlights
- World Series of Football champion (1902)

Philip Henry Draper (April 3, 1875 – September 28, 1945) was an American football halfback and fullback from Troy, New York. After two seasons at Williams College, he starred for the Chicago Athletic Association, the Troy Laureates and two of the earliest professional clubs: the Watertown Red & Black and the 1902 All-Syracuse team that won the first World Series of Football.

== Early life ==
Draper was born in Troy on April 3, 1875, to Frederick Elliott Draper, junior partner in the cigar and tobacco firm Fitzpatrick & Draper, and Anne Jane Woodcock. He attended Troy's common and public schools, Troy Academy, and the Park Avenue Institute in Bridgeport, Connecticut, before entering Williams College.

== Football career ==
=== College and amateur ===
As a teenager, Draper gained football experience with his hometown team, the Troy Laureates, in 1891 and 1892, and with the Bridgeport YMCA in 1893.

At Williams, he was a fullback on the 1894 and 1895 squads. Leaving college after only two years, he continued to play football, starting the 1896 season with a brief return to the Laureates before joining the Chicago Athletic Association (CAA) football team in October. He was made captain of the 1897 CAA team, whose only loss and only points allowed that season were to undefeated Yale.

He was expected to return to the CAA in 1898, but lingering effects of malaria contracted during a brief period of service in the Spanish–American War kept him out for much of that season. When he resumed play in November, he was back with the Troy Laureates. He remained with Troy through 1901.

=== Professional ===
In 1902, he played for the Watertown Red & Black, then one of the top professional football clubs in the country. When the first World Series of Football was organized at the end of the season and Watertown declined to participate, Draper and his Watertown backfield mates Billy Bottger and Harry Mason entered the tournament as members of a so-called "All-Syracuse" team. All-Syracuse won all three of its games to capture the championship.

One of Draper's All-Syracuse teammates was Pop Warner, who remembered Draper in a 1927 article as "about as good a halfback as ever played the game". Similar praise came from the team's organizer, Buck O'Neill, as related in 1934 by Harry March: "[O'Neill] declares Draper the finest player he has ever seen and that he would be even better today with the intricacies of the forward pass, both on offense and defense."

Draper was back with Watertown in the following season of 1903. At this time he was listed at 5' 10" and 195 pounds. The Red & Blacks entered that year's World Series, but lost the championship game to the Franklin Athletic Club.

== Career outside football ==
Draper enlisted in the New York National Guard in 1897 and served for about ten years, including in the Spanish–American War. He worked for a time for a wholesale drug company and for his father's cigar and tobacco firm. In 1907, he and a business partner established an insurance and bonding business under the name Draper & Higgins. Draper was identified as a "general insurance agent" in a profile published in 1923. He ran for comptroller of Troy in 1925, but was defeated in what was described as one of the closest races ever seen in the history of the city. Shortly thereafter, he became the city's park superintendent.

== Personal life and family ==
Older brother Fred Draper played football and baseball at Williams and became a New York state senator. Younger brother Louis LeGrand Draper played football at the same college. Big Bill Edwards, in his 1916 book Football Days, opined, "The greatest three players from any one family that ever played the backfield would probably be the three Draper brothers—Louis, Phil and Fred. All went to Williams and all were stars; heavy, fast backs, who were good both on defense and offense, capable of doing an immense amount of work and never getting hurt."

Phil married Sally Bryant Stimson in 1904 at Watertown; they had a son, Philip Henry Draper Jr., and a daughter, Emily.

Draper died of a heart attack on September 28, 1945, at a veteran's hospital in The Bronx.
