= Harry Mason (American football) =

American gridiron football player

Profile
- Position: Halfback

Career history
- 1902: Watertown Red & Black (Ind.)
- 1902: Syracuse Athletic Club (WSF)

Awards and highlights
- 1902 Football World Series Champs

Harry Mason was an American professional football player during the early 1900s. He played for the Syracuse Athletic Club during the tournament later called the 1902 World Series of Football, held at Madison Square Garden in New York City. Prior to playing for Syracuse, Mason played professionally for the Watertown Red & Black. He was reportedly recruited to join Syracuse before the 1902 series by Colgate University football coach, Frank "Buck" O'Neill. Mason scored a touchdown in each of the series two games, as Syracuse defeated the Knickerbocker Athletic Club, and the Orange Athletic Club, to claim the 1902 series title.

Today Mason's uniform from that series is on display at the Pro Football Hall of Fame in Canton, Ohio. It was donated to the Hall by a man claiming to be his son around 1983. The man offered to donate the uniform, but only if Joe Horrigan, the Hall's Vice President of Communications and Exhibits, would pick it up himself from his home in Buffalo, New York.
