= Senator Draper =

Senator Draper may refer to:

- Eben S. Draper Jr. (1893–1959), Massachusetts State Senate
- Frederick E. Draper (1873–1951), New York State Senate
- Joseph Draper (1794–1834), Virginia State Senate
