= Knickerbocker Athletic Club football team =

The Knickerbocker Athletic Club was an early amateur and later professional football team based in Manhattan, New York City from around 1897 until 1902. The clubhouse stood at the corner of Madison Avenue and E 45th Street in midtown Manhattan, near Grand Central Station. The team is best known for participating in the 1902 World Series of Football. During the event, the Knickerbockers defeated the Warlow Athletic Club from Long Island by a score of 11–6. However, the Knickerbockers were defeated by the Syracuse Athletic Club, 36–0, on New Year's Eve.

== Other games ==
On Thanksgiving Day 1897, the Knickerbockers traveled to Chicago, Illinois to play the Bankers Athletic Club. The Knickerbockers lost that game 46–8. On October 15, 1898, the team was reportedly defeated by the Duquesne Country and Athletic Club from Pittsburgh, Pennsylvania, by a score of 45–0. Other records show that the team battled the Orange Athletic Club to scoreless games in 1898 and 1899, while the team defeated the Orange 12–0 on November 19, 1898. However, the records show Orange defeating the Knickerbockers 11–10 on November 7, 1899. On October 18, 1903, the Knickerbockers defeated a team of United States Marines from the Brooklyn Navy Yard, 47–0. In the 1903 Greater New York championship tournament held at Madison Square Garden, the Knickerbockers finished second to the Olympic Athletic Club.

== The Knickerbocker Athletic Club murders ==
In the late 1890s the Knickerbocker Athletic Club was involved in “one of the most famous criminal cases which ever came before the New York courts”. A club member, Roland Molineux, stood trial for murder. Molineux was accused of sending cyanide-laced over-the-counter medicine to a Club member with whom he had fought, and evidence was produced during the trial that Molineux had previously sent cyanide-laced over-the-counter medicine to another Club member. Molineux was convicted after a sensational trial in 1898. However, that trial was overturned in a 1901 landmark decision by the Court of Appeals of New York. That decision, citing the Constitutional presumption of innocence and now known as “The Molineux Rule”, tightened requirements for admitting evidence into court trials.
