= World Series of Pro Football =

The World Series of Pro Football was a name applied to two professional football events:

- World Series of Football (1902), a multiple-game tournament held from 1902 to 1903
- World Series of Pro Football (1950), the unofficial AAFC-NFL unified championship held in September 1950
