= Warlow Athletic Club =

Warlow Athletic Club Whitestone Warlows

General information
- Founded: 1894
- Folded: 1939
- Stadium: Knab's Park
- Headquartered: Long Island, New York, U.S.
- Colors: Dark Blue and White

Nickname
- Warlow Indians

Team history
- Warlow Athletic Club (1894–1932); Whitestone American Legion (1933); Columbia Dems (1934); Warlows (1939)

League / conference affiliations
- Independent

Championships
- League championships: 2 New York Independent Champions: 1900, 1901

Warlow Athletic Club in 1895

Warlow Athletic Club (also formally known as the Whitestone Warlows and the Warlow Indians) were an early amateur, and later professional, American football team. The club, based on Long Island, is best remembered for playing in the 1902 World Series of Football, played at Madison Square Garden. During the Series, the club played the Knickerbocker Athletic Club in a hard fought 11–6 loss and was eliminated from the competition.

The team claimed to be the "New York Independent Football Champions" in 1900 and 1901. Over the span of its history, the team's name changed several times. In 1933, the club took to the field as the Whitestone American Legion, while a year later they were called the Columbia Dems. After a 4-year hiatus, they finally fielded one final team, called the simply the Warlows.

Warlow Athletic Club in 1900
