= Mike Purdy =

American football player and coach (1892–1950)

Profile
- Positions: Fullback, halfback, quarterback

Personal information
- Born: January 24, 1892; Auburn, New York, U.S.
- Died: January 10, 1950 (aged 57); Auburn, New York, U.S.
- Listed height: 5 ft 10 in (1.78 m)
- Listed weight: 179 lb (81 kg)

Career information
- College: Brown

Career history

Playing
- 1919: Akron Indians
- 1920: Rochester Jeffersons
- 1921: New York Brickley Giants
- 1921: Syracuse Pros
- 1922: Milwaukee Badgers

Coaching
- 1921: Syracuse Pros

Clair Joseph "Mike" Purdy Jr. (January 24, 1892 – January 10, 1950) was an American football player and coach. He played in the National Football League with the Rochester Jeffersons, New York Brickley Giants, Syracuse Pros and the Milwaukee Badgers. Brickley's New York Giants are not related to the modern-day New York Giants. He also played in the Ohio League in 1919 for the Akron Pros and even recommended that Fritz Pollard join the team that season.
