= Andy Friedman =

American football player and manager

Andy Freidman
Profile
- Positions: Fullback, Manager

Career history
- Syracuse Pros (1921)

Andy Friedman was an American professional football player at fullback, as well as the manager of the Syracuse Pros in 1921. The Pros were a professional team from Syracuse, New York. It is suspected, though not certain, that the team joined the American Professional Football Association (now the National Football League) in 1921.
