= 1897 Chicago Athletic Association football team =

American football team season

1897 Chicago Athletic Association football
- League: Independent
- Record: 10–1–1
- Manager: William Hale Thompson
- Captain: Phil Draper
- Home field: Washington Park Race Track

The 1897 Chicago Athletic Association football team was an American football team representing the Chicago Athletic Association (CAA). The team finished with a 10–1–1 record and held all opponents scoreless except for Yale, the only team to beat the CAA. Fullback/halfback Phil Draper was the team captain, replacing the previous season's captain William Hale Thompson, who was made manager. The team played its home games at Washington Park Race Track in Chicago.

== Schedule ==
Date	Opponent	Site	Result	Source
September 18	at Waukegan Athletic Association	Waukegan, IL	W 10–0	
September 25	First Regiment	Washington Park Race Track; Chicago, IL	W 14–0	
October 9	South Bend Commercial-Athletic Club	Washington Park Race Track; Chicago, IL	W 32–0	
October 16	Illinois Cycling Club	Washington Park Race Track; Chicago, IL	W 6–0	
October 20	at Northwestern (Note: The two games against Northwestern were practice games that were closed to the public. College Football Data Warehouse includes these two games in the CAA season record. The games do not appear in the record of CAA games as compiled by the Bankers Athletic Club (published in the Chicago Inter Ocean, December 5, and corrected on December 7). Northwestern University does not include the two games in its official season records.)	Sheppard Field; Evanston, IL	T 0–0	
October 21	at Northwestern	Sheppard Field; Evanston, IL	W 4–0	
October 23	Racine Athletic Club	Washington Park Race Track; Chicago, IL	W 44–0	
October 30	at Newton Athletic Association	Newton Centre, MA	W 36–0	
November 6	at Yale	Yale Field; New Haven, CT	L 6–16	
November 13	at Orange Athletic Club	Orange, NJ	W 6–0	
November 20	Illinois Cycling Club	Washington Park Race Track; Chicago, IL	W 22–0	
November 25	New Jersey Athletic Club	Washington Park Race Track; Chicago, IL	W 52–0	
