= Madison Square Garden (1879) =

Former arena in Manhattan, New York

Madison Square Garden I
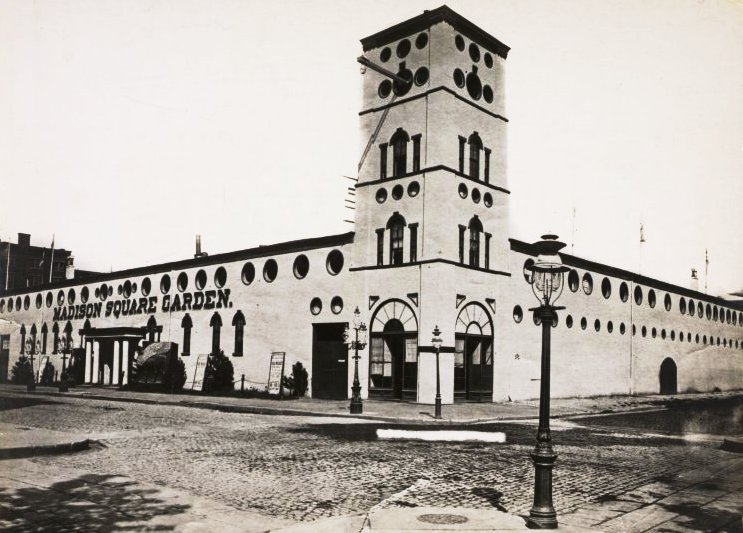
- Interactive map of Madison Square Garden I
- Full name: Madison Square Garden
- Location: New York City, New York
- Coordinates: 40°44′34″N 73°59′08″W
- Owner: William Kissam Vanderbilt
- Operator: William Kissam Vanderbilt
- Capacity: 10,000

Construction
- Built: 1874
- Opened: May 31, 1879
- Closed: 1890
- Demolished: 1890

Madison Square Garden (1879–1890) was an arena in New York City at the northeast corner of East 26th Street and Madison Avenue in Manhattan. The first venue to use that name, it seated 10,000 spectators. It was replaced with a new building on the same site.

== Origins ==
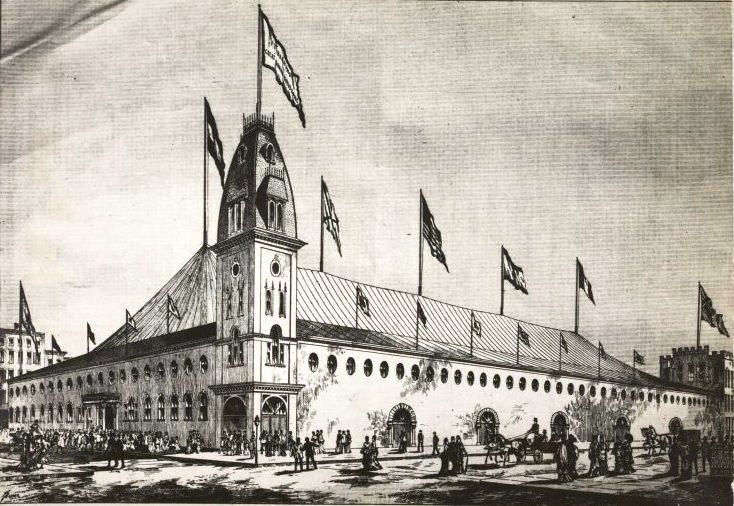
P. T. Barnum's Roman Hippodrome, a predecessor to Madison Square Garden

The site upon which Madison Square Garden was eventually established was originally occupied by a small passenger depot of the New York and Harlem Railroad. The site was vacated by the railroad in 1871 when it moved operations uptown to Grand Central Depot at 42nd Street. The site was vacant until 1874 when it was leased to P. T. Barnum who converted it into an open oval arena 270 feet (82 m) long, with seats and benches in banks, which he named the Great Roman Hippodrome where he presented circuses and other performances. The roofless building was also called Barnum's Monster Classical and Geological Hippodrome and measured 420 feet (130 m) by 200 feet (61 m).

In 1876, the arena was leased to band leader Patrick Gilmore, who renamed it Gilmore's Garden and presented flower shows, beauty contests, music concerts, temperance and revival meetings, walking marathons, and the first Westminster Kennel Club Dog Show, called at the time (1877) the "First Annual N.Y. Bench Show." Gilmore also presented boxing, but since competitive boxing matches were technically illegal at the time, he called them "exhibitions" or "illustrated lectures."

The next to lease the space was W. M. Tileston, who was an official of the dog show. He attempted to attract a more genteel crowd with tennis, a riding school and an ice carnival; the arena had one of the first indoor ice rinks in the United States.

== Naming ==
After the death of Cornelius Vanderbilt, who owned the site, his grandson William Kissam Vanderbilt took back control and announced on May 31, 1879, that the arena was to be renamed "Madison Square Garden". Vanderbilt presented sporting events such as indoor track and field meets, a convention of Elks, the National Horse Show and more boxing, including some bouts featuring John L. Sullivan, who began a four-year series of exhibitions in July 1882, drawing over-capacity crowds. P.T. Barnum also used the Garden to exhibit Jumbo, the elephant he had bought from the London Zoo; he drew sufficient business to recover the $10,000 pricetag.

Another notable use of the first Garden was as a velodrome, an oval bicycle racing track with banked curves. At the time, bicycle racing was one of the biggest sports in the country. "[The] top riders [were] among the sports stars of their day. The bike races at Madison Square Garden were all the rage around the turn of the last century." Madison Square Garden was the most important bicycle racing track in the United States and the Olympic discipline known as the Madison is named after the original Garden.

However, the Garden was hot in the summertime and freezing in the wintertime. It had a leaky roof and dangerous balconies that had collapsed resulting in deaths. Vanderbilt eventually sold what Harper's Weekly called his "patched-up, grimy, drafty, combustible old shell" to a syndicate that included J. P. Morgan, Andrew Carnegie, James Stillman and W. W. Astor, who closed it to build a new arena designed by noted architect Stanford White. Demolition began in July 1889, and the second Madison Square Garden, which cost more than a half-million dollars to build, opened on June 6, 1890. It was demolished in 1926, and the New York Life Building, designed by Cass Gilbert and completed in 1928, replaced it on the site.

== See also ==
- Madison Square
- Madison Square Garden (1890)
- Madison Square Garden (1925)
- Madison Square Garden (1968)
- Madison Square Garden Bowl
