= Madison Square Garden =

Multi-purpose indoor arena in New York City, U.S.

- MSG; The Garden; The World's Most Famous Arena; The Mecca

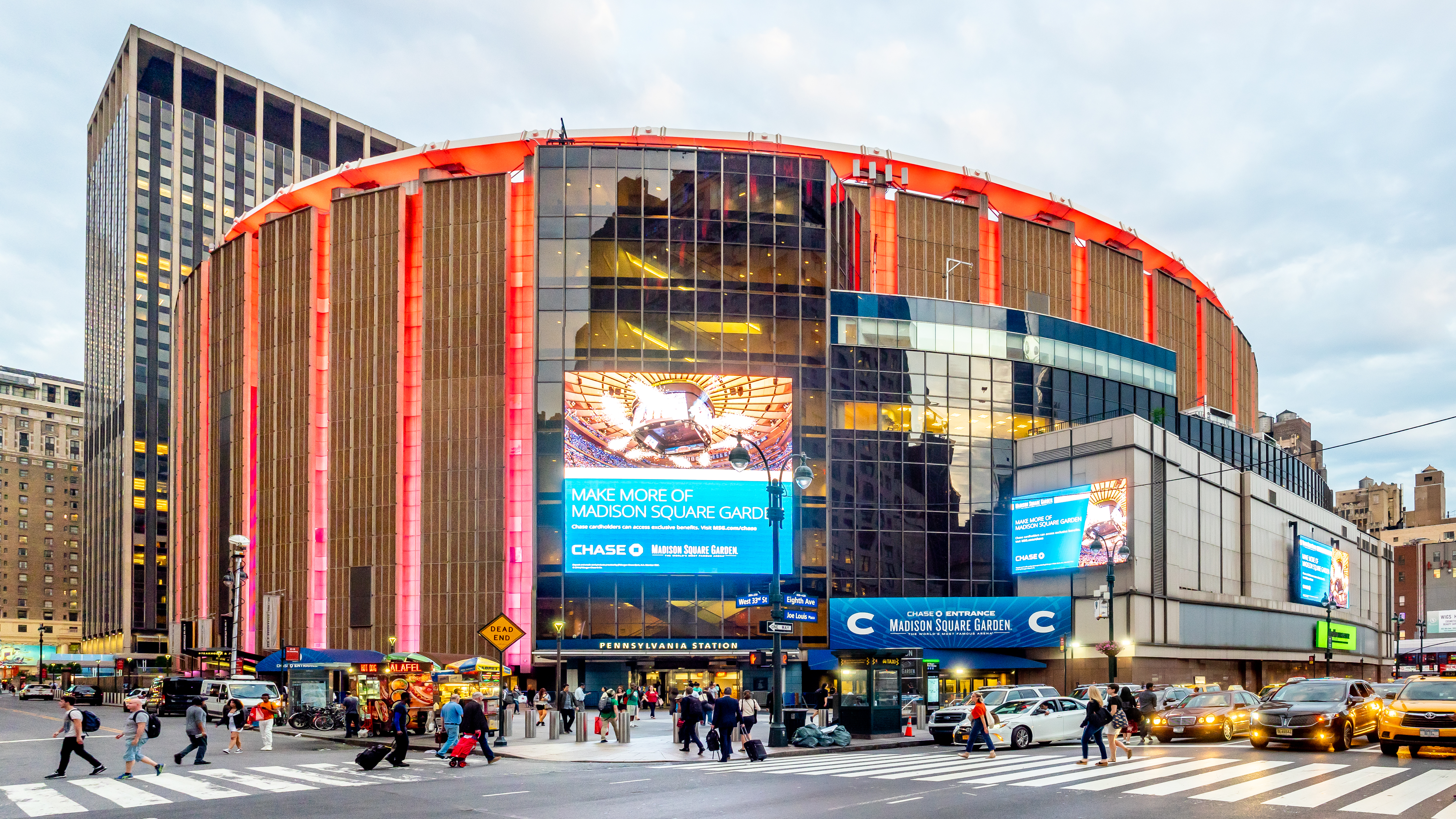
- Madison Square Garden in 2019

- Location in Manhattan Location in New York City Location in New York State Location in the United States
- Address: 4 Pennsylvania Plaza
- Location: Midtown Manhattan, New York City, U.S.
- Coordinates: 40°45′2″N 73°59′37″W
- Owner: Madison Square Garden Entertainment
- Capacity: Basketball: 20,012; Boxing/MMA: 20,789; Concert: 22,000; Ice hockey: 18,006; Pro wrestling: 18,538
- Field size: 820,000 sq ft (76,000 m^{2})
- Public transit: Amtrak: Penn Station; LIRR: Penn Station; NJ Transit: Penn Station; New York City Subway: 34th Street–Penn Station (7th Ave); 34th Street–Penn Station (8th Ave); 34th Street–Herald Square; PATH: 33rd Street; New York City Bus: M4, M7, M20, M34 SBS, M34A SBS, Q32, BxM2; at 34th Street–Penn Station

Construction
- Groundbreaking: October 29, 1964
- Opened: 1879, 1890, 1925 (former locations); February 11, 1968; 58 years ago (current location)
- Renovated: 1989–1991; 2011–2013
- Cost: $123 million ($1.14 billion in 2025 dollars); Renovation (1991): $200 million ($473 million in 2025 dollars); Renovation (2011–2013): $1 billion ($1.38 billion in 2025 dollars)
- Architects: Charles Luckman Associates; Brisbin Brook Beynon Architects
- Structural engineer: Severud Associates
- Services engineer: Syska & Hennessy, Inc.
- General contractor: Turner/Del E. Webb

Tenants
- New York Rangers (NHL) (1968–present); New York Knicks (NBA) (1968–present); St. John's Red Storm (NCAA) (1969–present); New York Raiders/Golden Blades (WHA) (1972–1973); New York Apples (WTT) (1977–1978); New York Stars (WBL) (1979–1980); New York Cosmos (NASL) (1983–1984); New York Knights (AFL) (1988); New York CityHawks (AFL) (1997–1998); New York Liberty (WNBA) (1997–2010, 2014–2017); New York Titans (NLL) (2007–2009)

Website
- msg.com/madison-square-garden

Madison Square Garden, colloquially known as the Garden or by its initials MSG, is a multi-purpose indoor arena in Midtown Manhattan, New York City, U.S. The arena is located between Seventh and Eighth avenues, extending from 31st to 33rd streets, atop Pennsylvania Station. The current site hosts the fourth venue to bear the name "Madison Square Garden"; the first two, opened in 1879 and 1890, were situated in Madison Square, on East 26th Street and Madison Avenue, with the third Madison Square Garden (1925) farther uptown at Eighth Avenue and 50th Street.

The Garden hosts professional ice hockey, professional basketball, boxing, mixed martial arts, concerts, ice shows, circuses, professional wrestling, and other forms of sports and entertainment. It is close to other Midtown Manhattan landmarks, including the Empire State Building, Koreatown, and Macy's at Herald Square. The arena is currently home to the New York Rangers of the National Hockey League (NHL), the New York Knicks of the National Basketball Association (NBA), and was home to the New York Liberty of the Women's National Basketball Association (WNBA) from 1997 to 2017.

Originally called Madison Square Garden Center, the Garden opened on February 11, 1968, on the site of the old Pennsylvania Station. It is the oldest major sporting facility in the New York metropolitan area. It is the oldest arena in the NBA and the second-oldest in the NHL, after Seattle's Climate Pledge Arena. As of 2016, MSG is also the second-busiest music arena in the world in terms of ticket sales. Including its two major renovations in 1991 and 2013, the Garden's total construction cost was approximately US$1.1 billion, and it has been ranked as one of the ten most expensive arena venues ever built. The edifice is part of the Pennsylvania Plaza office and retail complex, named for the railway station.

== History ==
=== Previous Gardens ===
Madison Square is formed by the intersection of 5th Avenue and Broadway at 23rd Street in Manhattan. It was named after James Madison, the fourth president of the United States.

Two venues called Madison Square Garden were located just northeast of the square, the original Garden from 1879 to 1890, and the second Garden from 1890 to 1925. The first, leased to P. T. Barnum, was demolished in 1890 because of a leaky roof and dangerous balconies that had collapsed, resulting in deaths. The second was designed by noted architect Stanford White. The new building was built by a syndicate that included J. P. Morgan, Andrew Carnegie, P. T. Barnum, Darius Mills, James Stillman and W. W. Astor. White gave them a Beaux-Arts structure with a Moorish feel, including a minaret-like tower modeled after Giralda, the bell tower of the Cathedral of Seville, soaring 32 stories, the city's second-tallest building at the time and dominating Madison Square Park. It was 200 feet (61 m) by 485 feet (148 m), and the main hall, which was the largest in the world, measured 200 feet (61 m) by 350 feet (110 m) with permanent seating for 8,000 people and floor space for thousands more. It had a 1,200-seat theater, a concert hall with a capacity of 1,500, the largest restaurant in the city, and a roof garden cabaret. The building cost $3 million. Madison Square Garden II was unsuccessful like the first Garden, and the New York Life Insurance Company, which held the mortgage on it, decided to tear it down in 1925 to make way for a new headquarters building, which would become the landmark Cass Gilbert-designed New York Life Building.

A third Madison Square Garden opened in a new location, on Eighth Avenue between 49th and 50th streets, from 1925 to 1968. Groundbreaking on the third Madison Square Garden took place on January 9, 1925. Designed by the noted theater architect Thomas W. Lamb, it was built at a cost of $4.75 million in 249 days by boxing promoter Tex Rickard; the arena was dubbed "The House That Tex Built". The arena was 200 feet (61 m) by 375 feet (114 m), with seating on three levels, and a maximum capacity of 18,496 spectators for boxing. It notably hosted a 20,000 person rally in 1939 of the German American Bund, a Nazi organization founded in the United States with covert guidance and financial backing from the Reich.

Demolition commenced in 1968 after the opening of the current Garden, and was completed in early 1969. The site is now the location of One Worldwide Plaza.

=== Current Garden ===
In February 1959, former automobile manufacturer Graham-Paige purchased a 40% interest in the Madison Square Garden for $4 million and later gained control. In November 1960, Graham-Paige president Irving Mitchell Felt purchased from the Pennsylvania Railroad the rights to build at Penn Station. To build the new facility, the above-ground portions of the original Pennsylvania Station were torn down. Talk of a new Garden dated back as early as 1946. The sight lines in the upper deck of the old Garden's left much to be desired, a problem exposed by growing attendance at Knicks games.

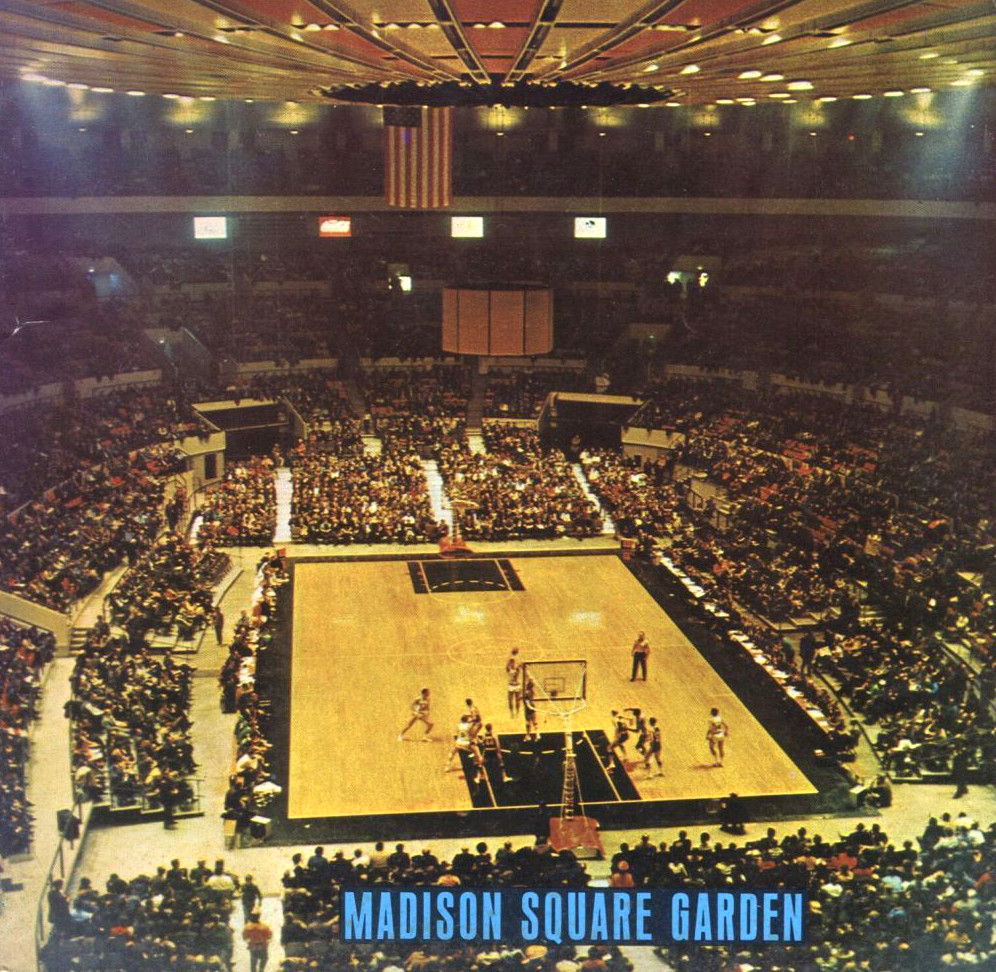
A 1968 New York Knicks game at Madison Square Garden

The new structure was one of the first of its kind to be built above the platforms of an active railroad station. It was an engineering feat constructed by Robert E. McKee of El Paso, Texas with the contribution of Arq. Leonel Viera's design for the Cilindro Municipal. Public outcry over the demolition of the Pennsylvania Station structure—an outstanding example of Beaux-Arts architecture—led to the creation of the New York City Landmarks Preservation Commission. The venue opened on February 11, 1968. Comparing the new and the old Penn Station, Yale architectural historian Vincent Scully wrote, "One entered the city like a god; one scuttles in now like a rat."

In 1972, Felt proposed moving the Knicks and Rangers to a then incomplete venue in the New Jersey Meadowlands, the Meadowlands Sports Complex. The Garden was also the home arena for the NY Raiders/NY Golden Blades of the World Hockey Association. The Meadowlands would eventually host its own NBA and NHL teams, the New Jersey Nets and the New Jersey Devils, respectively. The New York Giants and Jets of the National Football League (NFL) also relocated there. In 1977, the arena was sold to Gulf and Western Industries. Felt's efforts fueled controversy between the Garden and New York City over real estate taxes. The disagreement again flared in 1980 when the Garden again challenged its tax bill. The arena has enjoyed tax-free status since the 1980s, under the condition that all Knicks and Rangers home games must be hosted at MSG, lest it lose this exemption. As such, when the Rangers have played neutral-site games—even those in New York City, such as the 2018 NHL Winter Classic, they have always been designated as the visiting team. The tax agreement includes an act of God clause, which allowed Knicks and Rangers home games to be played elsewhere during the 2020 NBA Bubble and 2020 Stanley Cup playoffs, respectively, because of the COVID-19 pandemic.

In 1984, the four streets immediately surrounding the Garden were designated as Joe Louis Plaza, in honor of boxer Joe Louis, who had made eight successful title defenses in the previous Madison Square Garden.

=== 1991 renovation ===
In April 1986, Gulf and Western announced that they would build a new Madison Square Garden a few blocks away on the site of present-day Hudson Yards. The plan would cost an estimated $150 million and included the demolition of the 1964 building to replace it with a new office tower development. After years of planning, Gulf and Western decided against building a new arena in favor of a renovation after estimated costs doubled during the process.

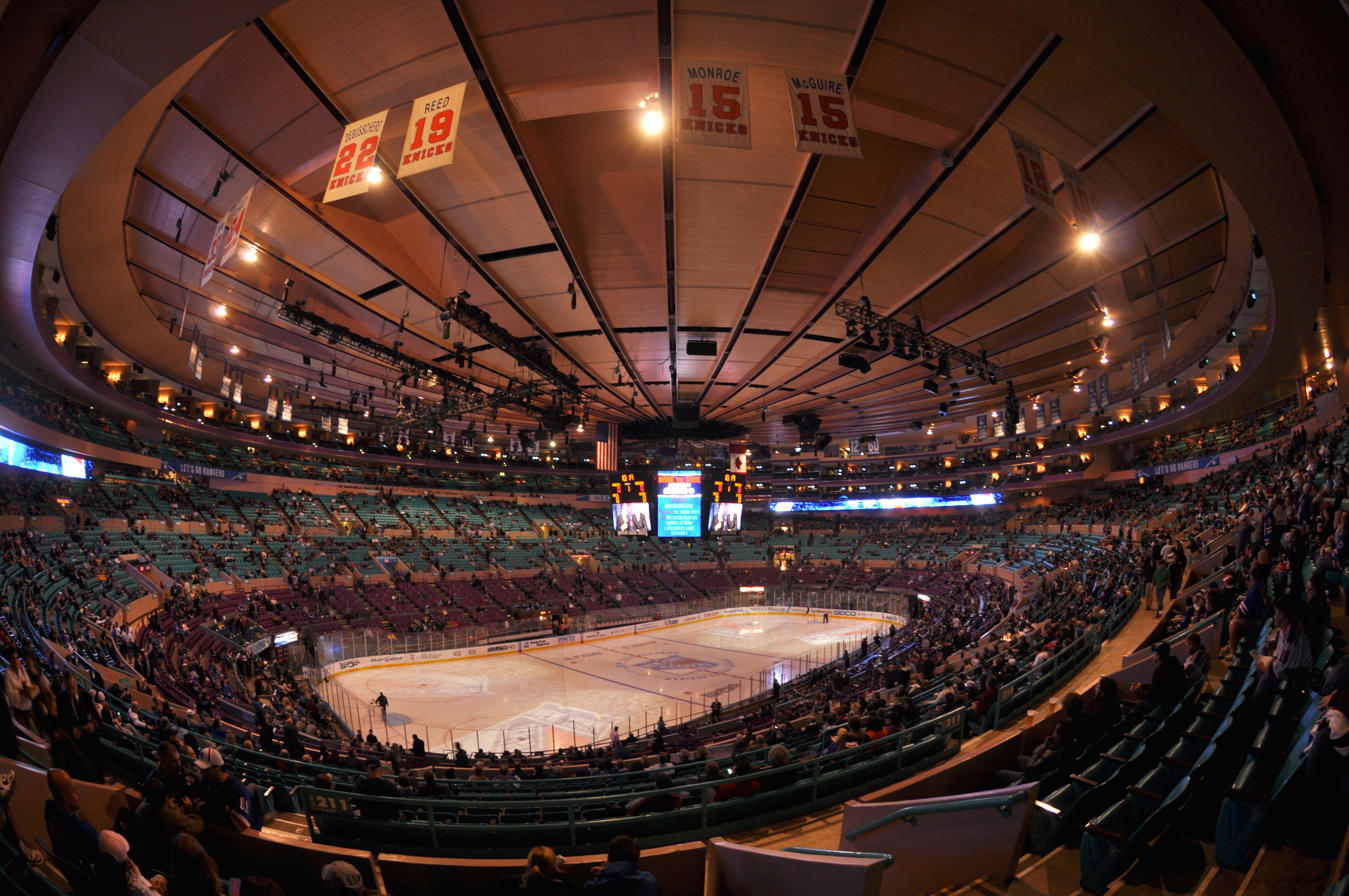
Madison Square Garden following its 1991 renovation

Garden owners spent $200 million in 1991 to renovate facilities and add 89 in place of hundreds of upper-tier seats. The project was designed by Ellerbe Becket. The renovation was criticized for perceived corporatization. Additionally, the renovation made bathrooms larger, expanded menus, added a new ventilation system, replaced all of the seats with new cushioned teal and violet seats, and refurbished both home teams' locker rooms.

In 2000, current MSG owner James Dolan was quoted as saying that a new arena was being considered as the current building was starting to show its age.

In 2004–2005, Cablevision battled with the City of New York over the proposed West Side arena, which was canceled. Cablevision then announced plans to raze the Garden, replace it with high-rise commercial buildings, and build a new Garden one block away at the site of the James Farley Post Office. Meanwhile, a new project to renovate and modernize the Garden completed phase one in time for the Rangers and Knicks' 2011–12 seasons, though the vice president of the Garden says he remains committed to the installation of an extension of Penn Station at the Farley Post Office site. While the Knicks and Rangers were not displaced, the New York Liberty played at the Prudential Center in Newark, New Jersey, during the renovation.

Madison Square Garden is the last of the NBA and NHL arenas not to be named after a corporate sponsor.

=== 2011–2013 renovation ===
Madison Square Garden's $1 billion second renovation took place mainly over three off-seasons. It was set to begin after the 2009–10 hockey/basketball seasons, but was delayed until after the 2010–11 seasons. Renovation was done in phases, with the majority of the work done in the summer months to minimize disruptions to the NHL and NBA seasons. While the Rangers and Knicks were not displaced, the Liberty played their home games through the 2013 season at Prudential Center in Newark, New Jersey, during the renovation.

New features include a larger entrance with interactive kiosks, retail, climate-controlled space, and broadcast studio; larger concourses; new lighting and LED video systems with HDTV; new seating; two new pedestrian walkways suspended from the ceiling to allow fans to look directly down onto the games being played below; more dining options; and improved dressing rooms, locker rooms, green rooms, upgraded roof, and production offices. The lower bowl concourse, called the Madison Concourse, remains on the sixth floor. The upper bowl concourse was relocated to the eighth floor and it is known as the Garden Concourse. The seventh floor houses the new Madison Suites and the Madison Club. The upper bowl was built on top of these suites. The rebuilt concourses are wider than their predecessors, and include large windows that offer views of the city streets around the Garden.

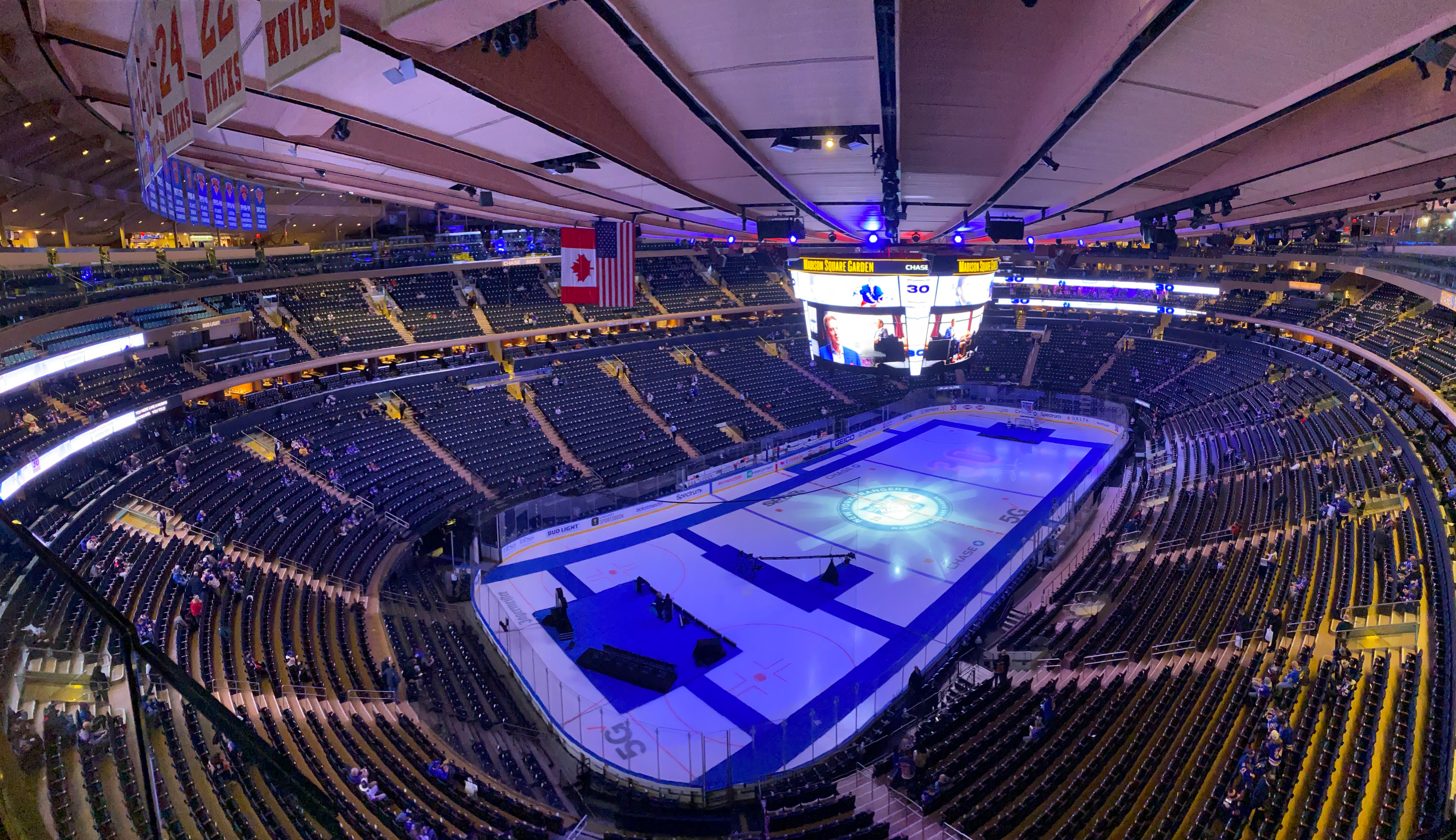
The playing surface before a New York Rangers game and the retirement ceremony of Henrik Lundqvist

During the three-year, $1 billion renovation of Madison Square Garden, code consulting and municipal approvals services were provided by Milrose Consultants, a building code consulting firm based in New York. Milrose Consultants supported the project with code analysis, place-of-assembly approvals, and assistance with certificate-of-occupancy services as part of the broader renovation effort.

Construction of the lower bowl (Phase 1) was completed in 2011. An extended off-season for the Garden permitted some advance work to begin on the new upper bowl, which was completed in 2012. This advance work included the West Balcony on the tenth floor, taking the place of sky-boxes, and new end-ice 300 level seating. The construction of the upper bowl along with the Madison Suites and the Madison Club (Phase 2) were completed for the 2012–13 NHL and NBA seasons. Phase 3, which involved the construction of the new lobby known as Chase Square, the Chase Bridges on the 10th floor, and the new scoreboard, was completed for the 2013–14 NHL and NBA seasons.

=== Penn Station renovation controversy ===
Madison Square Garden is seen as an obstacle in the renovation and future expansion of Penn Station, which expanded in 2021 with the opening of Moynihan Train Hall at the James Farley Post Office, and some have proposed moving MSG to other sites in western Manhattan. On February 15, 2013, Manhattan Community Board 5 voted 36–0 against granting a renewal to MSG's operating permit in perpetuity and proposed a 10-year limit instead to build a new Penn Station where the arena is currently standing. Manhattan borough president Scott Stringer said, "Moving the arena is an important first step to improving Penn Station." The Madison Square Garden Company responded by saying that "[i]t is incongruous to think that M.S.G. would be considering moving."

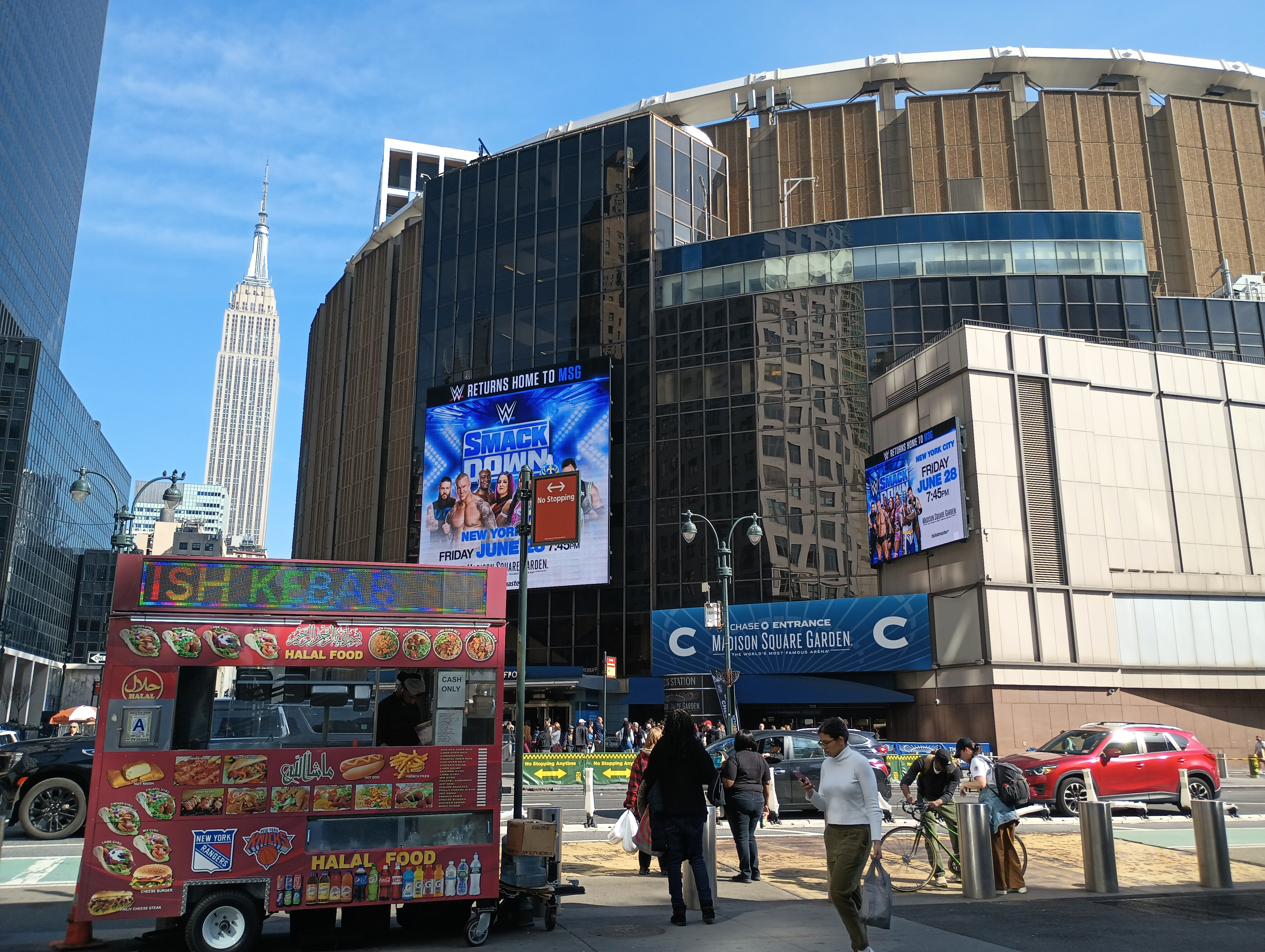
Madison Square Garden in 2024, with the Empire State Building in the background

In May 2013, four architecture firms – SHoP Architects, SOM, H3 Hardy Collaboration Architecture, and Diller Scofidio + Renfro – submitted proposals for a new Penn Station. SHoP Architects recommended moving Madison Square Garden to the Morgan Postal Facility a few blocks southwest, as well as removing 2 Penn Plaza and redeveloping other towers, and an extension of the High Line to Penn Station. Meanwhile, SOM proposed moving Madison Square Garden to the area just south of the James Farley Post Office, and redeveloping the area above Penn Station as a mixed-use development with commercial, residential, and recreational space. H3 Hardy Collaboration Architecture wanted to move the arena to a new pier west of Jacob K. Javits Convention Center, four blocks west of the current station and arena. Then, according to H3's plan, four skyscrapers would be built, one at each of the four corners of the new Penn Station superblock, with a roof garden on top of the station; the Farley Post Office would become an education center. Finally, Diller Scofidio + Renfro proposed a mixed-use development on the site, with spas, theaters, a cascading park, a pool, and restaurants; Madison Square Garden would be moved two blocks west, next to the post office. DS+F also proposed high-tech features in the station, such as train arrival and departure boards on the floor, and apps that would inform waiting passengers of ways to occupy their time until they board their trains. Madison Square Garden rejected the notion that it would be relocated, and called the plans "pie-in-the-sky".

In June 2013, the New York City Council Committee on Land Use voted unanimously to give the Garden a ten-year permit, at the end of which period the owners would either have to relocate or go back through the permission process. On July 24, the City Council voted to give the Garden a 10-year operating permit by a vote of 47–1. "This is the first step in finding a new home for Madison Square Garden and building a new Penn Station that is as great as New York and suitable for the 21st century," said City Council speaker Christine Quinn. "This is an opportunity to reimagine and redevelop Penn Station as a world-class transportation destination."

In October 2014, the Morgan facility was selected as the ideal area for Madison Square Garden to be moved, following the 2014 MAS Summit in New York City. More plans for the station were discussed. Then, in January 2016, New York Governor Andrew Cuomo announced a redevelopment plan for Penn Station that would involve the removal of The Theater at Madison Square Garden, but would otherwise leave the arena intact.

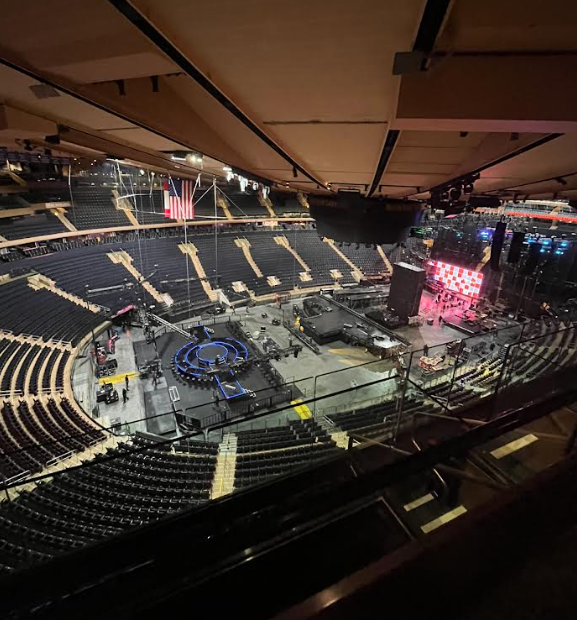
Interior of Madison Square Garden in June 2024 before Justin Timberlake's "The Forget Tomorrow World Tour"

In June 2023, nearing the end of the Garden's ten-year permit granted by the city, the Metropolitan Transportation Authority, along with Amtrak and NJ Transit, filed a report stating that MSG is no longer compatible with Penn Station, with the report saying, "MSG's existing configuration and property boundaries impose severe constraints on the station that impede the safe and efficient movement of passengers and restrict efforts to implement improvements, particularly at the street and platform levels." On September 14, 2023, the New York City Council voted 48–0 to renew the operating permit for Madison Square Garden for five years, the shortest ever granted by the city to the Garden.

In May 2026, Amtrak announced their plans for redeveloping Penn Station. Under the selected plan, Madison Square Garden will remain at its current location and will not be forced to move.

== Events ==
=== Regular events ===
==== Sports ====
Madison Square Garden hosts approximately 320 events a year. It is the home to the New York Rangers of the National Hockey League, and the New York Knicks of the National Basketball Association. Before 2020, the New York Rangers, New York Knicks, and the Madison Square Garden arena itself were all owned by the Madison Square Garden Company. The MSG Company split into two entities in 2020, with the Garden arena and other non-sports assets spun off into Madison Square Garden Entertainment and the Rangers and Knicks remaining with the original company, renamed Madison Square Garden Sports. Both entities remain under the voting control of James Dolan and his family. The arena is also host to the Big East men's basketball tournament and was home to the finals of the National Invitation Tournament from the beginning of its existence up until 2022. It also hosts select home games for the St. John's Red Storm, representing St. John's University in men's college basketball, and almost any other kind of indoor activity that draws large audiences, such as the Westminster Kennel Club Dog Show and the 2004 Republican National Convention.

The Garden was home of the NBA draft and NIT Season Tip-Off, as well as the former New York City home of the Ringling Brothers and Barnum and Bailey Circus and Disney on Ice; all four events are now held at the Barclays Center in Brooklyn. It served the New York Cosmos for half of their home games during the 1983–84 NASL Indoor season.

Many of boxing's biggest fights were held at Madison Square Garden, including the Roberto Durán–Ken Buchanan affair, the first Muhammad Ali – Joe Frazier bout and the US debut of Anthony Joshua that ended in a huge upset when he was beaten by Andy Ruiz. Before promoters such as Don King and Bob Arum moved boxing to Las Vegas, Nevada, Madison Square Garden was a popular location for boxing. The original 18 1/2 ft × 18 1/2 ft (5.6 m × 5.6 m) ring, which was brought from the second and third generation of the Garden, was officially retired on September 19, 2007, and donated to the International Boxing Hall of Fame after 82 years of service. A 20 ft × 20 ft (6.1 m × 6.1 m) ring replaced it beginning on October 6 of that same year. The UFC has hosted many events at Madison Square Garden in recent years and has put on some of the highest grossing PPV events in history.

==== Professional wrestling ====
Madison Square Garden has hosted many notable WWE (formerly WWF and WWWF) events, and it is affectionally known as WWE's "home office". The Garden has hosted three WrestleMania events, including the first edition of the annual marquee event for WWE, as well as the 10th and 20th editions. Madison Square Garden is also one of two venues (the other being Allstate Arena) to host WrestleMania three times.

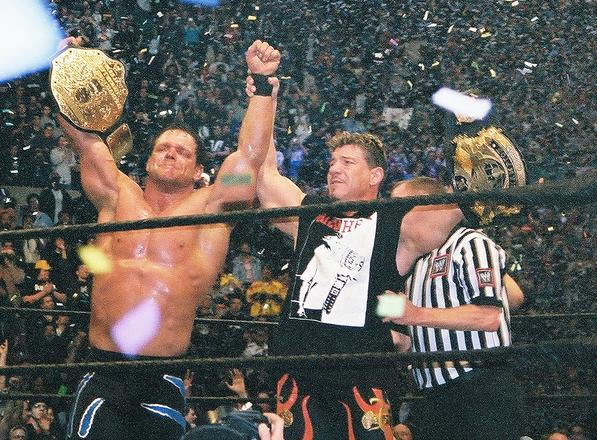
Eddie Guerrero (right) and close friend Chris Benoit (left) celebrating as reigning World Champions at WrestleMania XX at Madison Square Garden

It also hosted the Royal Rumble in 2000 and 2008; SummerSlam in 1988, 1991 and 1998; as well as Survivor Series in 1996, 2002 and 2011. Multiple episodes of WWE's weekly shows, Raw and SmackDown have been broadcast from the Arena as well.

New Japan Pro-Wrestling (NJPW) and Ring of Honor (ROH) hosted their G1 Supercard supershow at the venue on April 6, 2019. A year later it was announced that New Japan Pro-Wrestling would return to Madison Square Garden alone on August 22, 2020, for NJPW Wrestle Dynasty. In May 2020, NJPW announced that the Wrestle Dynasty show would be postponed to 2021 due to the COVID-19 pandemic.

==== Concerts ====
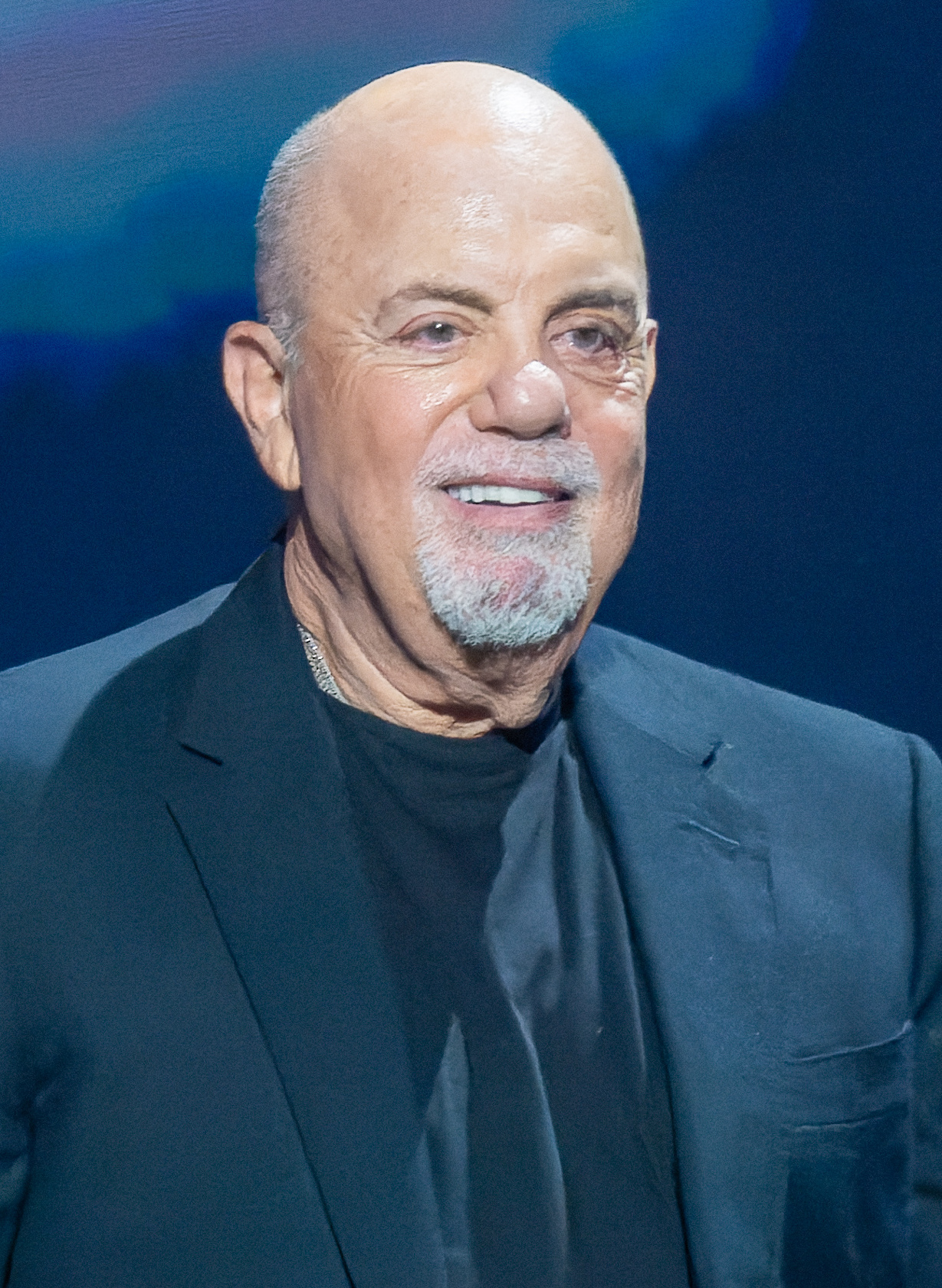
Billy Joel, who currently dominates Madison Square Garden's concert performance records, and who in 2013 was recognized as a Madison Square Garden "franchise"

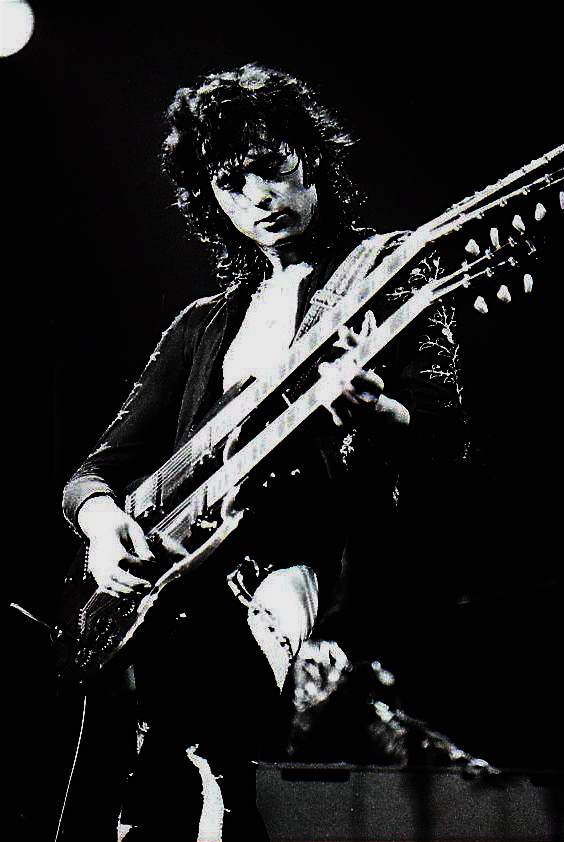
Led Zeppelin guitarist Jimmy Page performing at Madison Square Garden in 1973

Madison Square Garden hosts more high-profile concert events than any other venue in New York City. It has been the venue for Michael Jackson's Bad World Tour in 1988, George Harrison's The Concert for Bangladesh, The Concert for New York City following the September 11 attacks, John Lennon's final concert appearance during an Elton John concert on Thanksgiving Night in 1974 before his murder in 1980, Ariana Grande held one of her concerts for The Honeymoon Tour, and Elvis Presley, who gave four sold-out performances in 1972, his first and last ever in New York City. Parliament-Funkadelic headlined numerous sold-out shows in 1977 and 1978. Kiss, who were formed in the arena's city and three of whose members were city-born, did six shows during their second half of the 1970s main attraction peak or "heyday": four sold out winter shows at the arena in 1977 (February 18 and December 14–16), and another two shows only this time in summer for a decade-ender in 1979 (July 24–25). They played their final two shows at the venue on the December 1 and 2, 2023, the 50th anniversary year of their formation.

Billy Joel, another city-born and fellow 1970's pop star, played his first Garden show on December 14, 1978, with that month's follow ups on the 15th, 16th and 18th. Joel would eventually dominate the record for most concerts performed at Madison Square Garden.

Led Zeppelin's three-night stand in July 1973 was recorded and released as both a film and album titled The Song Remains The Same. The Police played their final show of their reunion tour at the Garden in 2008.

In the summer of 2017, Phish held a 13-night series of concerts called "The Bakers' Dozen", during which the band played 237 unique songs, repeating none during the entire run. The Garden commemorated "The Bakers' Dozen" by adding a Phish-themed banner to the rafters. With their first MSG show taking place on December 30, 1994, Phish has regularly played annual multi-night runs, typically around New Year's Eve. As of July 2026, Phish has performed 96 times at MSG.

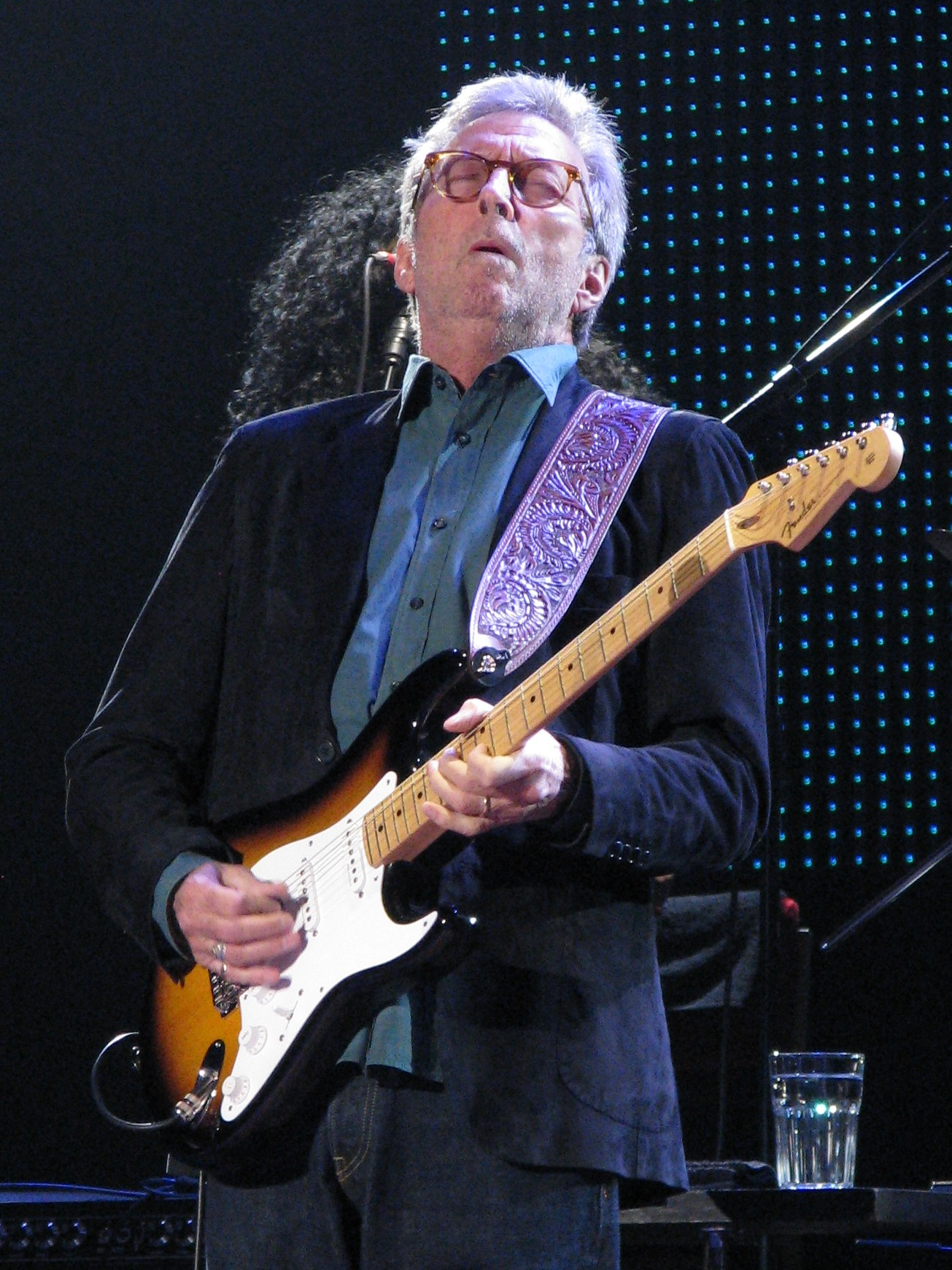
Eric Clapton at the Garden in 2015. Clapton has played 45 concerts at the venue since 1968.

Elton John once held the all-time record for the greatest number of appearances at the Garden with 64 shows. In a 2009 press release, John was quoted as saying "Madison Square Garden is my favorite venue in the whole world. I chose to have my 60th birthday concert there, because of all the incredible memories I've had playing the venue." A DVD recording was released as Elton 60—Live at Madison Square Garden.

The current record-holder for most appearances is Billy Joel, who as of July 2024 had played the Garden 150 times. That figure includes a "residency" of monthly concerts that he started in 2014 and played nearly continuously for a decade. Joel has stated that the site "has the best acoustics, the best audiences, the best reputation, and the best history of great artists who have played there. It is the iconic, holy temple of rock and roll for most touring acts." Joel would set his first record for most consecutive performances by a music artist at Madison Square Garden in 2006 after performing 12 consecutive concerts at the arena from January to April of that year. In December 2013, Joel was named as Madison Square Garden's first ever music "franchise"; in doing so, Joel joined the New York Knicks, New York Rangers and New York Liberty as an original Madison Square Garden franchise.

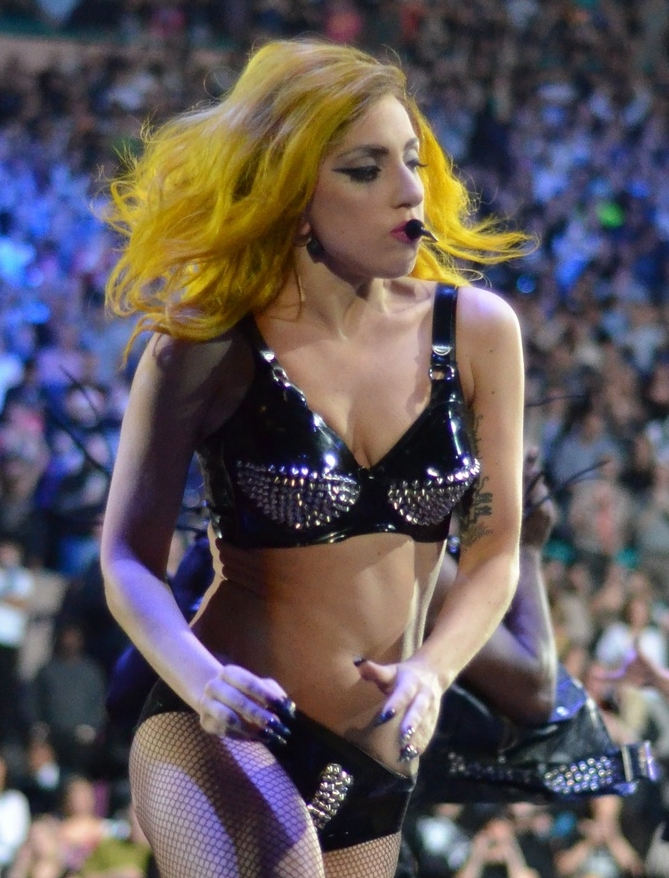
Lady Gaga performing at the Garden in 2011

The Grateful Dead performed in the venue 53 times from 1979 to 1994, with the first show being held on January 7, 1979, and the last being on October 19, 1994; their longest run was in September 1991.

The Who have headlined at the venue 32 times, including a four-night stand in 1974, a five-night stand in 1979, a six-night stand in 1996, and four-night stands in 2000 and 2002. They also performed at The Concert for New York City in 2001.

Touring phenomenon Dave Matthews Band has played the venue 29 times, and has a standing reservation for a two-night run each November. They have used this booking six times since 2018, and added a third night in 2024. Memorable moments include a surprise guest appearance by James Brown in 2002, a rare performance of "Halloween" in 2005, and their triumphant return after an eight-year absence in 2018.

On March 10, 2020, a 50th-anniversary celebration of The Allman Brothers Band titled 'The Brothers' took place, featuring the five surviving members of the final Allman Brothers lineup and Chuck Leavell. Dickey Betts was invited to participate but his health precluded him from traveling. This was the final concert at the venue before the COVID-19 pandemic forced its closure. Live shows returned to The Garden when the Foo Fighters headlined a show there on June 20, 2021. The show was for a vaccinated audience only and was the first 100 percent capacity concert in a New York arena since the start of the pandemic.

==== Other events ====
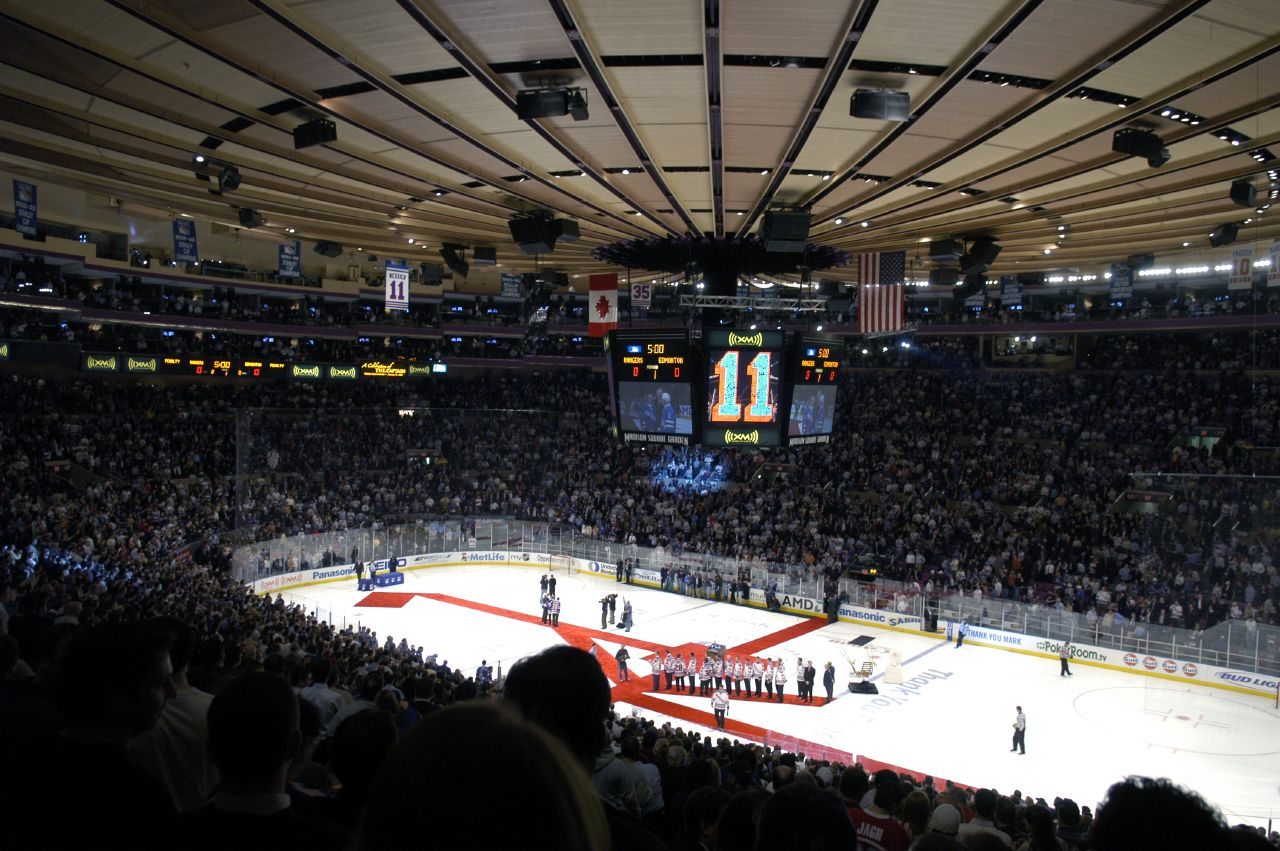
Madison Square Garden as it appeared during "Mark Messier Night" on January 12, 2006

It hosted the 1976 Democratic National Convention and 1980 Democratic National Convention with Carter, the 1992 Democratic National Convention with Clinton, and the 2004 Republican National Convention with Bush, and hosted the NFL draft for many years (later held at Garden-leased Radio City Music Hall, now shared between cities of NFL franchises). The Jeopardy! Teen Tournament and several installments of Celebrity Jeopardy! were filmed at MSG in 1999, as well as several episodes of Wheel of Fortune in 1999 and 2013.

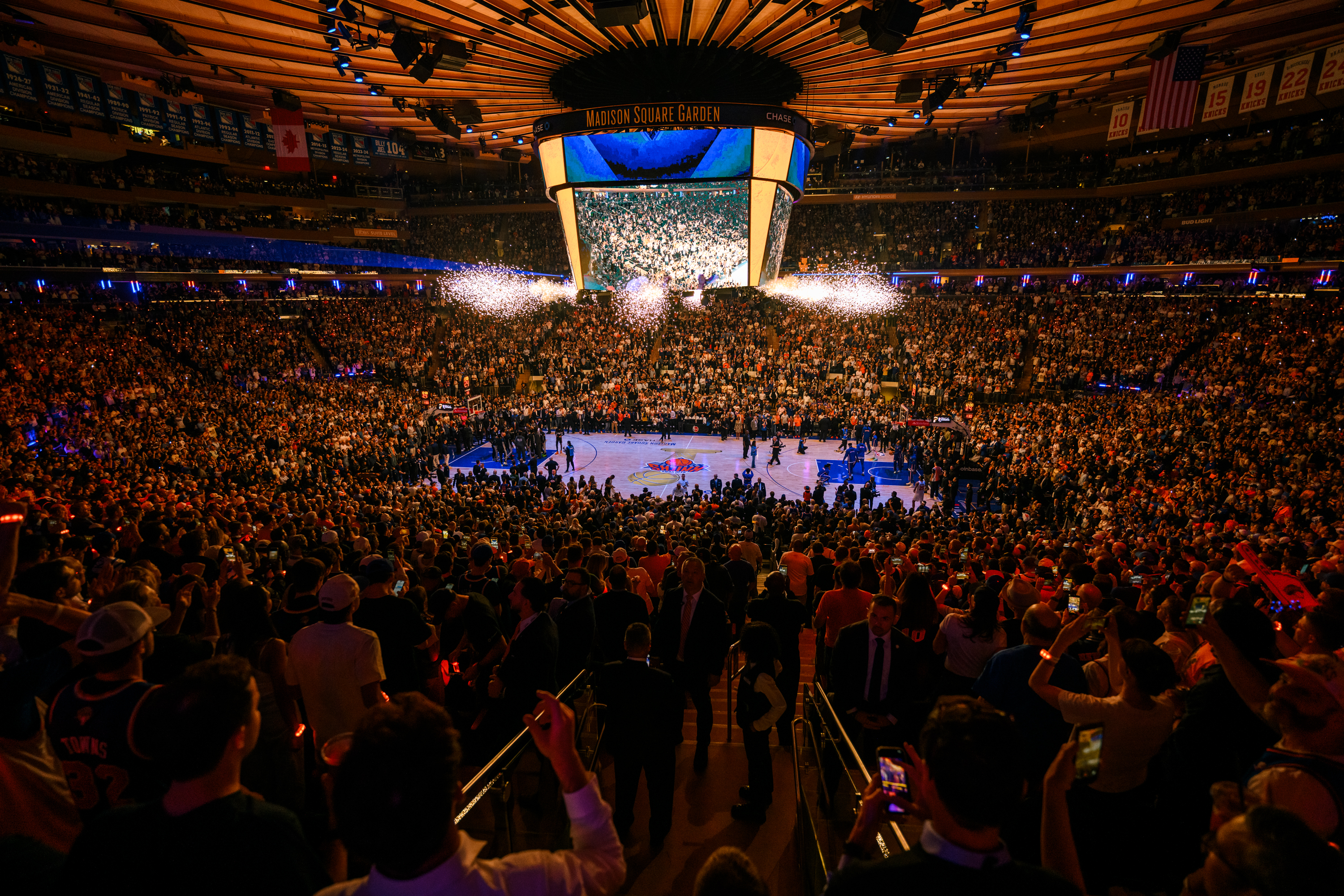
MSG during Game 3 of the 2026 NBA Finals between the Knicks and the San Antonio Spurs

The New York City Police Academy, Baruch College/CUNY, and Yeshiva University also hold their annual graduation ceremonies at Madison Square Garden. It hosted the Grammy Awards in 1972, 1997, 2003, and 2018 (which are normally held in Los Angeles) as well as the Latin Grammy Awards of 2006.

The group and Best in Show competitions of the Westminster Kennel Club Dog Show have been held at MSG every February since 1877. Its original run at MSG through 2020 was the arena's longest continuous tenancy. In 2021, the event moved to Tarrytown, and later the USTA Billie Jean King National Tennis Center, due to the COVID-19 pandemic. The show returned to MSG in 2025 for the first time since 2020.

On July 2, 2026, Taylor Swift and Travis Kelce hosted their rehearsal dinner for their wedding at Madison Square Garden stadium, with the ceremony taking place the following day.

=== Notable firsts and significant events ===
MSG has hosted the following championships:

- NBA Finals: 1970, 1972, 1973, 1994, 1999, and 2026
- Stanley Cup Final: 1972, 1994, and 2014
- WNBA Finals: 1997, 1999, 2000, and 2002

MSG hosted the Stanley Cup Final and NBA Finals simultaneously on two occasions: in 1972 and 1994.

MSG has hosted the following All-Star Games:

- NHL All-Star Game: 1973, 1994
- NBA All-Star Game: 1998, 2015
- WNBA All-Star Game: 1999, 2003, 2006
- All American Karate Championships held in 1968 and 1969, both won by Chuck Norris. The 1970 edition was won by Mitchell Bobrow.
- UFC held its first event in New York City, UFC 205: Alvarez vs. McGregor, at Madison Square Garden on November 12, 2016. This was the first event the organization held after New York State lifted the ban on mixed martial arts.

Mike Krzyzewski recorded two notable milestones at the arena. In 2011, he surpassed Bob Knight as the coach with the most wins in NCAA Division I men's basketball history when Duke defeated Michigan State. Four years later, a Duke victory over St. John's gave Coach K his 1,000th career win.

Stephen Curry broke the NBA's all-time three-point scoring record at Madison Square Garden, on December 14, 2021. The Warriors defeated the Knicks 105–96 with Curry recording his 2,977th career three-pointer by the end of the game, eclipsing Ray Allen's 2,973 career total.

On October 27, 2024, then presidential candidate Donald Trump hosted a campaign rally at Madison Square Garden. The event was particularly notable for remarks by comedian Tony Hinchcliffe, who spoke prior to Trump and made jokes widely considered offensive toward Puerto Ricans, which became a significant talking point going into the presidential election.

The Professional Women's Hockey League (PWHL) held its first ever game at Madison Square Garden on April 4, 2026, between the New York Sirens and Seattle Torrent. The Sirens won 2–1 against the Torrent, in a shootout, in front of 18,006 fans, setting a new attendance record for women's hockey in the United States.

That game was actually the first with fans held at the Garden; one of the Professional Women's Hockey Players Association "tour" games was held there in February 2021, but due to restrictions related to the COVID-19 pandemic, no fans were allowed inside to watch that first-ever professional women's hockey game held at MSG.

== Security and surveillance ==
=== Use of facial recognition ===
In 2018, under new security chief John Eversole, Madison Square Garden began deploying facial recognition to capture images of patrons entering the building and cross-reference them with a database of gathered information for security purposes, one of the first in the nation to do so.

In 2022, it was reported that MSG-owner James Dolan had instituted a policy of using facial recognition at his venues, including Madison Square Garden, to prevent admission to attorneys whose law firms were engaged in legal disputes with Dolan and his businesses, even when those attorneys had legitimate tickets to the show or event. This led to lawsuits and an investigation into whether Dolan's venues should be stripped of their state-issued liquor licenses. By 2025 this had expanded to maintaining watch lists of basketball fans who had previously criticized Dolan's ownership, and banning some of them from entering Madison Square Garden venues—often under falsified pretenses.

Former MSG Vice President of Security Donald Ingrasselino has alleged in a lawsuit that those banned also included a woman who had accused Dolan of sexual abuse and of trafficking her to Harvey Weinstein, with Eversole allegedly instructing security personnel to find ways to record the woman's phone conversations.

Former Knicks players also spoke of their rooms being bugged, and Madison Square Garden employees spoke of being followed and surveilled outside of work.

Ingrasselino and several other current and former security employees have alleged the use of MSG's security service and surveillance apparatus to target marginalized groups in the mid-2020s.

According to a 2026 Wired investigation, in one example MSG security teams had been "obsessively" tracking the movements of a trans woman referred to pseudonymously as 'Nina' over a two-year period, monitoring her movements in the venue down to the second, which according to one former security staffer was because Eversole had developed a "fixation" on her due to her being a trans woman, which included ordering his staff to compile an open-source intelligence dossier on her. Nina was described by Wired as sitting in the courtside 'Celebrity Row' at games, and by The New York Times as being a personal friend to several of the Knicks players. According to several former employees, the presence of a known trans woman sitting courtside where she might be caught on camera made several MSG executives, including Eversole, uncomfortable for fear of it causing damage to MSG's reputation. Nina was subsequently banned from entering Madison Square Garden based on what security employees unanimously described as fabricated pretenses.

In June 2026, Madison Square Garden suffered a data breach. According to research by 404 Media, one of the files included in the breach data showed that MSG had been building a dossier on activists who opposed MSG's use of facial recognition.

== Recognition given by Madison Square Garden ==
=== Madison Square Garden Gold Ticket Award ===
In 1977, Madison Square Garden announced Gold Ticket Awards would be given to performers who had brought in more than 100,000 unit ticket sales to the venue. Since the arena's seating capacity is about 20,000, this would require a minimum of five sold-out shows. Performers who were eligible for the award at the time of its inauguration included Chicago, John Denver, Peter Frampton, the Rolling Stones, the Jackson 5, Elton John, Led Zeppelin, Sly Stone, Jethro Tull, the Who, and Yes. Graeme Edge, who received his award in 1981 as a member of the Moody Blues, said he found his gold ticket to be an interesting piece of memorabilia because he could use it to attend any event at the Garden. Many other performers received Gold Ticket Awards between 1977 and 1994.

=== Madison Square Garden Platinum Ticket Award ===
Madison Square Garden also gave Platinum Ticket Awards to performers who sold over 250,000 tickets to their shows throughout the years. Winners of the Platinum Ticket Awards include: the Rolling Stones (1981), Elton John (1982), Yes (1984), Billy Joel (1984), the Grateful Dead (1987), and Madonna (2004).

=== Madison Square Garden Hall of Fame ===
The Madison Square Garden Hall of Fame honors those who have demonstrated excellence in their fields at the Garden. Most of the inductees have been sports figures, however, some performers have been inducted as well. Elton John was reported to be the first non-sports figure inducted into the MSG Hall of Fame in 1977 for "record attendance of 140,000" in June of that year. For their accomplishment of "13 sell-out concerts" at the venue, the Rolling Stones were inducted into the MSG Hall of Fame in 1984, along with nine sports figures icons, bringing the hall's membership to 107.

=== Madison Square Garden Walk of Fame ===
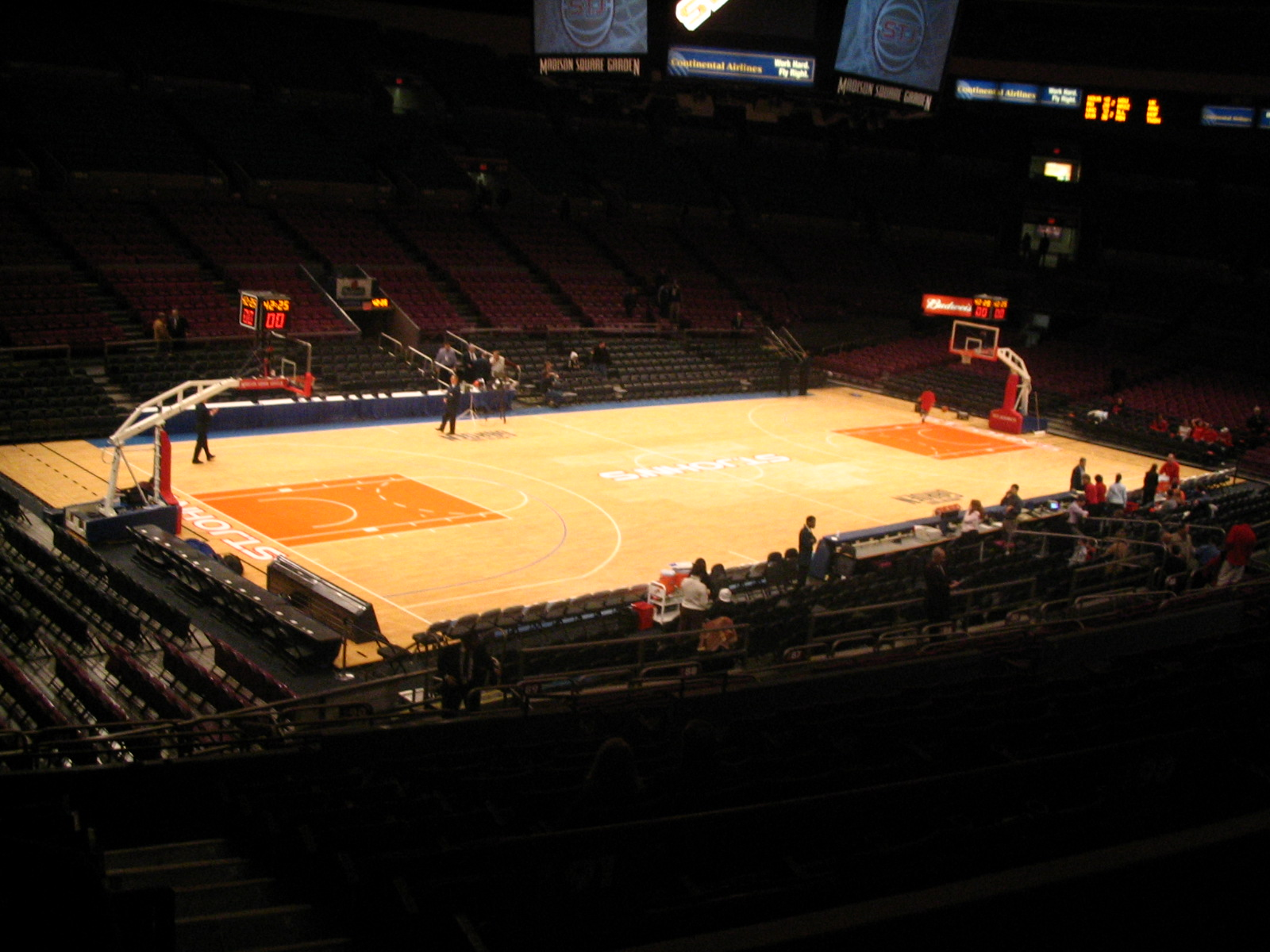
Getting the arena ready for a St. John's Red Storm basketball game in 2005

The walkway leading to the arena of Madison Square Garden was designated as the "Walk of Fame" in 1992. It was established "to recognize athletes, artists, announcers and coaches for their extraordinary achievements and memorable performances at the venue." Each inductee is commemorated with a plaque that lists the performance category in which his or her contributions have been made. Twenty-five athletes were inducted into the MSG Walk of Fame at its inaugural ceremony in 1992, a black-tie dinner to raise money to fight multiple sclerosis. Elton John was the first entertainer to be inducted into the MSG Walk of Fame in 1992. Billy Joel was inducted at a date after Elton John, and the Rolling Stones were inducted in 1998. In 2015, the Grateful Dead were inducted into the MSG Walk of Fame along with at least three sports-related figures.

=== Capacity ===
Basketball
Years	Capacity
1968–1971	19,500
1971–1972	19,588
1972–1978	19,693
1978–1989	19,591
1989–1990	18,300
1990–1991	19,081
1991–2012	19,763
2012–2013	19,033
2013–present	19,812

Ice hockey
Years	Capacity
1968–1972	17,250
1972–1990	17,500
1990–1991	16,792
1991–2012	18,200
2012–2013	17,200
2013–present	18,006

=== The Theater at Madison Square Garden ===
The Theater at Madison Square Garden seats between 2,000 and 5,600 for concerts and can also be used for meetings, stage shows, and graduation ceremonies. It was the home of the NFL draft until 2005, when it moved to the Jacob K. Javits Convention Center after MSG management opposed a new arena for the New York Jets. It also hosted the NBA draft from 2001 to 2010. The theater also occasionally hosts boxing matches.

The fall 1999 Jeopardy! Teen Tournament as well as Celebrity Jeopardy! competitions were held at the theater. Wheel of Fortune taped at the theater twice in 1999 and 2013. In 2004, it was the venue of the Survivor: All-Stars finale. No seat is more than 177 feet (54 m) from the 30' × 64' stage. The theater has a relatively low 20-foot (6.1 m) ceiling at stage level and all of its seating except for boxes on the two side walls is on one level slanted back from the stage. There is an 8,000-square-foot (740 m^{2}) lobby at the theater.

== Accessibility and transportation ==
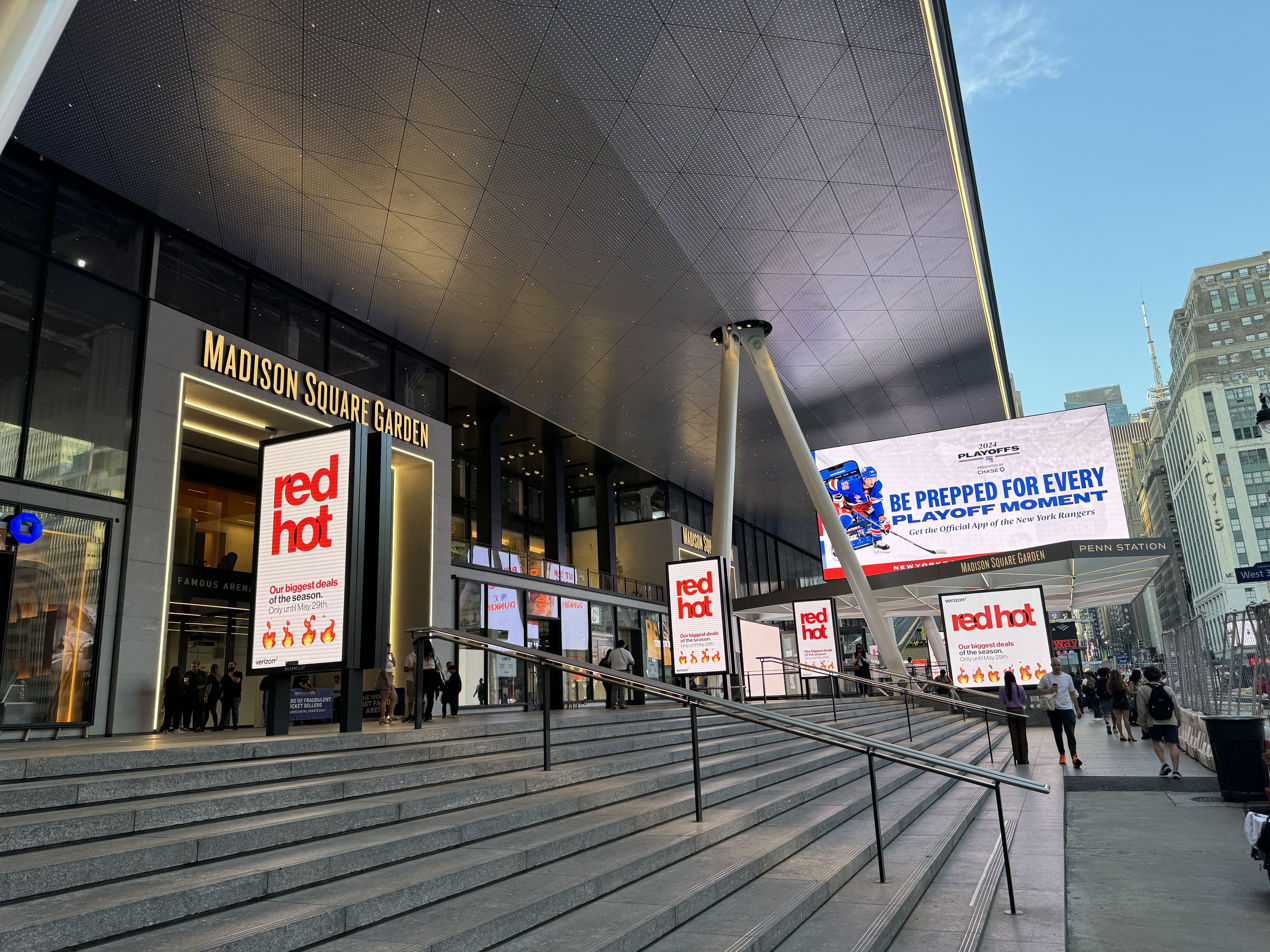
The 7th Avenue entrance to Madison Square Garden and Penn Station in 2024

Madison Square Garden sits directly atop a major transportation hub, New York Penn Station, which is served by Long Island Rail Road and NJ Transit commuter rail, as well as Amtrak. The Garden is also accessible via the New York City Subway at the 34th Street–Penn Station (A, C, and E trains) and the 34th Street–Penn Station (1, 2, and 3 trains) stations.

== See also ==
- List of indoor arenas by capacity
- List of indoor arenas in the United States
- List of NCAA Division I basketball arenas
- Madison Square Garden Bowl, a former outdoor boxing venue in Queens operated by the Garden company
- Royal Albert Hall

Events and tenants
Preceded by MSG III	Home of the New York Knicks; 1968–present (MSG IV)	Succeeded by current
Preceded by MSG III	Home of the New York Rangers; 1968–present (MSG IV)	Succeeded by current
Preceded by first arena Prudential Center	Home of the New York Liberty; 1997–2010; 2014–2017	Succeeded by Prudential Center; Westchester County Center
Preceded by first arena	Home of the New York Titans; 2007–2009	Succeeded by Amway Arena
Preceded by first arena	Home of the New York Knights; 1988	Succeeded by last arena
Preceded by first arena	Home of the New York CityHawks; 1997–1998	Succeeded by Hartford Civic Center
Preceded by Metropolitan Sports Center; Montreal Forum	Host of the NHL All-Star Game; 1973; 1994	Succeeded by Chicago Stadium; Fleet Center
Preceded by first event Caesars Palace; Safeco Field	Host of WrestleMania; 1985; 1994; 2004	Succeeded by Nassau Coliseum, Rosemont Horizon, & Los Angeles Memorial Sports Arena; Hartford Civic Center; Staples Center
Preceded by Gund Arena; Smoothie King Center	Host of the NBA All-Star Game; 1998; 2015	Succeeded by Oakland Arena; Air Canada Centre
Preceded by The Summit Houston	Masters Cup Venue; 1977–1989	Succeeded by Festhalle Frankfurt Frankfurt
Preceded by Los Angeles Memorial Sports Arena; Oakland Coliseum Arena	WTA Tour Championships Venue; 1977; 1979–2000	Succeeded by Oakland Coliseum Arena; Olympiahalle
