= John Barsha =

Russian-born American football player (1898–1976)

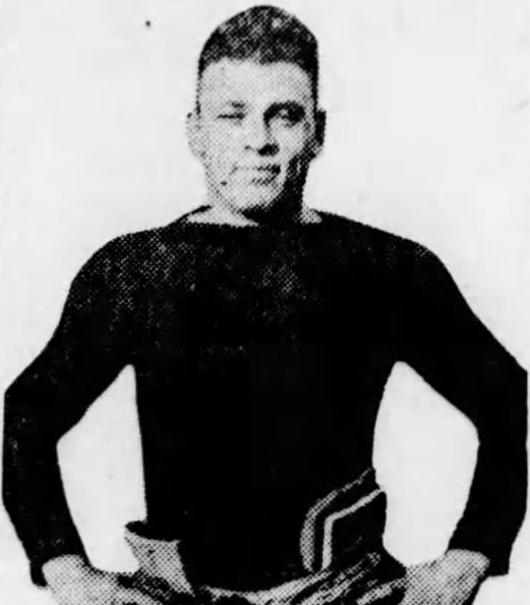
- Barsha while at Syracuse

Profile
- Position: Fullback

Personal information
- Born: December 25, 1898; Russia
- Died: February 18, 1976 (aged 77); New York, New York, U.S.

Career information
- High school: Boys (Brooklyn, New York, U.S.)
- College: Syracuse

Career history
- Rochester Jeffersons (1920); Syracuse Pros (1921)
- Stats at Pro Football Reference

John F. Barsha (born Abraham Barshofsky, December 25, 1898 – February 18, 1976), was a Russian-American professional American football fullback who played for the Rochester Jeffersons of the American Professional Football Association (APFA) and the Syracuse Pros, who may or may not have been members of the same league. He played college football, basketball and baseball at Syracuse. He was also nicknamed "the Brooklyn Bullet".

== Early and personal life ==
Barsha was Jewish, and his family immigrated from Russia to the United States when he was a small child. He attended Boys High School in Brooklyn, New York. During his senior year of high school, he changed his name from Abraham Barshofsky to John Barsha. According to OrangeHoops.org, he did it to "hide his participation in an unscheduled game that his basketball team played without the coach's knowledge". He lived in Brooklyn, New York.

Barsha also attended the Syracuse University College of Law and worked as a lawyer. He also coached basketball and football at Norwich High School in Norwich, New York. He had two children (son; Jerry, and daughter; Betty Schwartz) with his wife Daisy Ferrari. He died at the age of 78 in 1976.

== College career ==
Barsha lettered in football, basketball and baseball for the Syracuse Orangemen of Syracuse University, serving as captain of both the basketball and the baseball teams. He was a member of Phi Beta Kappa, and was a magna cum laude graduate of the university.

He lettered four seasons for the football team from 1916 to 1919. He was co‐captain of the 1918 Walter Camp All American football team and named an Honorable Mention.

Barsha played guard on the basketball team. He played in 17 games, starting 16, during the 1917–18 college basketball season and averaged 2.0 points per game. The team finished with a 16–1 record and were later retroactively named national champions by the Helms Athletic Foundation. He played in 16 games, all starts, during the 1918–19 season and averaged 6.1 points per game. Barsha was the team's designated free throw shooter that season. He played in 18 games, all starts, during the 1919–20 season and averaged 3.5 points per game. He was a team captain that season. Barsha played in 51 games, starting 50, during his college basketball career and averaged 3.8 points per game.

He also played catcher on the baseball team.

== Professional career ==
Barsha played in three games, all starts, as a fullback for the Rochester Jeffersons of the APFA in 1920 and scored one rushing touchdown. He later played for the Syracuse Pros.

After his professional career ended, Barsha worked as an attorney.

== See also ==
- List of notable Jewish American football players
