= Oreos Athletic Club =

The Oreos Athletic Club or Ashbury Oreos were an early professional American football team, established in 1903, and based in Asbury Park, New Jersey. The team is best remembered for playing in the 1903 World Series of Football at Madison Square Garden. During the Series, the Oreos played against the Watertown Red & Black in a hard-fought 5–0 loss. The team lost another game during the event to the Orange Athletic Club by a score of 22–0. According to reports, Watertown won the game on a controversial touchdown call, by the referee, in the second half of the game. Fighting and rioting soon broke out between the Oreos and Watertown fans, before being contained by the New York Police Department.
