= Frederick E. Draper =

American politician

Frederick E. Draper (3 April 1873 in Troy, New York – 1951), Republican, represented the Thirty-first Senate District in the 144th and the 145th New York State Legislature.

He received his education in the public schools of Troy, Williams College (1895), Harvard Law School, 1898.

He was a star athlete at Williams, where he captained the baseball and football teams. He played football for the Newton Athletic Association of Newton, Massachusetts, from 1895 to 1897. Big Bill Edwards wrote in his 1916 book Football Days, "The greatest three players from any one family that ever played the backfield would probably be the three Draper brothers—Louis, Phil and Fred. All went to Williams and all were stars; heavy, fast backs, who were good both on defense and offense, capable of doing an immense amount of work and never getting hurt."

Draper served as a private in the Spanish war. He was admitted to the practice of law in 1898, specializing in corporations, commercial law, bankruptcy and estates. From 1908 to 1914 he was judge of the city court of Troy. During the World War, he was chairman of local exemption board No. 3.

Draper was married to Mary J. Mann Draper, and fathered three children.
