= World Series of Football (1902–03) =

American football tournament held in Madison Square Garden, New York City (1902–03)

- Sport: Football
- Founded: 1902
- Founder: Tom O'Rourke
- Folded: 1903
- Claim to fame: First indoor pro football games First attempt at a national professional championship
- No. of teams: 5 (1902); 4 (1903)
- Country: United States
- Last champions: Franklin Athletic Club (1903); All-Syracuse (1902)

The World Series of Football was a series of football games played indoors at New York City's Madison Square Garden in 1902 and 1903. It originally comprised five teams, four from the state of New York and one from New Jersey. While none of the teams were really considered the best in the country, historians refer to the affair as a "World Series". However, it was hardly a series in the sense of two strong teams playing each other over several games. In fact, no team played another more than once and the team pairings were also considered odd. Under the 1902 system, the anticipated second-place team was automatically swept into the championship game without even playing a down while the expected first-place finisher had to fight its way through the brackets, effectively creating a cross between a traditional tournament and a "gauntlet-style" tournament for the first-place team.

The series is best remembered for showcasing the first indoor professional football game in 1902.

== 1902 series ==
The event was the idea of Tom O'Rourke, who was the manager of the Gardens at the time. He needed an event to draw people to the Gardens in late December, which was a slow time of the year for sporting events. Basketball and hockey were not yet major sports in New York, so O'Rourke decided to play to host a series of indoor football games. He decided to invite several professional and college teams to the Gardens for the series. Tom O'Rourke envisioned a series of games, showcasing the best in college and pro teams, eventually leading to one climactic game, crowning the "champion of the world."

=== Finding teams ===
O'Rourke had a tough time finding teams to play in the tournament. The colleges refused due to increased pressure from the Amateur Athletic Association to stop participating in professional games. Also the Pittsburgh Stars, Philadelphia Phillies and Philadelphia Athletics, along with the first National Football League, had all disbanded. The Watertown Red and Blacks, who were the top team in New York state at the time (and one of the few teams of the era that still exists today) also refused the series. For reasons not fully known, the best team in the nascent Ohio League, the Akron East Ends, were not invited. This left four teams to compete in the tournament: the Syracuse Athletic Club, the Knickerbocker Athletic Club, the Warlow Athletic Club and the Orange Athletic Club. O'Rourke did finally get a fifth team to join the series when some players from the Phillies and Athletics got together and formed what was called the "New York" team. In calling them the "New York" team, O'Rourke expected to give his patrons the pleasure of watching a "home team" win. The team was made up of eight Phillies and four Athletics that included A's coach Charles "Blondy" Wallace and Phillies coach Ben Roller.

=== The field ===
Madison Square Garden had to be redone to accommodate the teams. The wooden flooring of the arena was removed and replaced by an earthen surface. During the event the goal lines were only 70 yards apart and the playing field was only 35 yards wide. The earthen surface also became sticky as the game progressed and made for some tough maneuvering, while the stands were right up to the playing field and proved to be a physical hazard. The kicking game was also drastically affected. In a game on a normal field the team with the longest punts had the advantage. However, the Gardens proved to be a dream for a weak punter due to the field size. The arena wall was right on the edge of the field, presenting a serious hazard for any sideline plays. One player reportedly knocked himself out of the tournament by running into the wall on the opening kickoff.

=== Outcome ===
The tournament was scheduled to last three nights starting on December 29 and ending on New Year's Eve. O'Rourke scheduled his tournament by considering the expected strengths of the teams. On opening night he scheduled the "New York" team against Syracuse. By defeating Syracuse the "New York" team, O'Rouke hoped, would defeat the team that would probably bring the fewest fans into the Garden. Then on the second night the Knickerbockers and Warlow would play to determine which team would be beaten by the "New York" team in the series third game. O'Rourke anticipated this game as having the best attendance of the tournament. Finally the fourth game, by holding out the Orange Athletic Club until the end, he predicted a New York versus New Jersey match-up in which New Jersey would lose a close game to one of the three New York teams.

However, O'Rourke did not realize how seriously the Syracuse team would take the tournament. Prior to the start of the series Syracuse signed three backs from Watertown (Phil Draper, Bill Bottger, and Harry Mason), along with Bemus and Hawley Pierce from the Carlisle Indian School and Bill Warner and his brother Glenn. The team was put together by Frank "Buck" O'Neill who conducted daily practices in preparation for the series. It would play under the name "All-Syracuse".

All-Syracuse defeated "New York" in what has been called the first indoor pro football game. The final score of the game was recorded as 6–0, but in reality it was 5–0 since touchdowns only counted for five points in 1902 and Pop Warner missed the extra point. Warner later suffered a head injury and was replaced by Blondy Wallace from the "New York" team later in the series. The Knickerbockers defeated Warlow the next night 11–6. Syracuse defeated the Knickerbockers 36–0 on New Year's Eve. The finale on New Year's night against Orange resulted in another 36–0 win, and the series championship, for Syracuse.

Date	Winning team	Losing team	Score
December 29, 1902	All-Syracuse	"New York"	5–0
December 30, 1902	Knickerbocker Athletic Club	Warlow Athletic Club	11–6
December 31, 1902	All-Syracuse	Knickerbocker Athletic Club	36–0
January 2, 1903	All-Syracuse	Orange Athletic Club	36–0

== 1903 series ==
O'Rourke planned another series for 1903. This year he planned separate tournaments for the top professional and local amateur football clubs, a high school all-star game, bicycle races, and a Gaelic football match. The end result would be fifteen football games during a span of six days at the Garden. The entrants in the pro tournament included Oreos Athletic Club from Asbury Park, New Jersey; the returning Orange Athletic Club; and the Franklin Athletic Club from Pennsylvania. The Watertown Red and Black, which refused entry into the tournament in 1902, put up $2000 in prize money ($1,250 for first place, $750 for second). Syracuse was offered a chance to defend their title but declined. Blondy Wallace also returned to the series, this time as a member of the Franklin team.

The pro tournament was to follow a four-team knockout format in which the winners of the first two matches, Watertown vs. Oreos and Franklin vs. Orange, would play each other for the championship. The losers of the first two matches would also play each other and the winner of that contest would play the loser of the championship game for second place.

The playing surface of the Gardens for the 1903 series was still 70 yards. However, the surface itself was also improved upon. Dirt was trucked into the Gardens and steamrolled into a more natural surface.

=== Results ===
In the pro tournament's opening game on December 14, 1903, the Watertown Red and Black defeated the Oreo Athletic Club by a score of 5–0. The game's only score came on a controversial touchdown call, by the referee, in the second half of the game. Fighting and rioting soon broke out between the Oreos and Watertown fans, before being contained by the New York Police Department.

In the second game, on December 15, Franklin came out the victor against Orange 12–0 amid various calls of rough play and fighting. Two nights later Franklin and Watertown featured in the championship game. Many Watertown fans bet between $100 and $500 a clip on their team. However Franklin won the game 12–0. With that win Franklin's bettors brought home over $4,000 in winnings. According to Dr. Harry March's often inaccurate book Pro Football: Its Ups and Downs, Frank Hinkey was a referee at the event. March states the officials during the series "were dressed in full evening dress, from top hats down to white gloves and patent leather shoes." During the last play of the series between Franklin and Watertown, the Franklin players knew they had the game in hand. As a result, the Franklin backfield agreed to run over the clean and sharply dressed Hinkley, purposely in jest, knocking him into the dirt. Hinkley took the incident in good nature and Franklin's management agreed to pay his cleaning bill.

In the match between opening-round losers, Orange defeated the Oreos 22–0 on December 18 for the right to play Watertown for second place the following day. Watertown won the second-place game, beating Orange 11–0.

Game	Date	Winning team	Losing team	Score
Semifinals	December 14, 1903	Watertown Red & Black	Oreos Athletic Club	5–0
Semifinals	December 15, 1903	Franklin Athletic Club	Orange Athletic Club	12–0
Championship	December 17, 1903	Franklin Athletic Club	Watertown Red & Black	12–0
Semifinal losers	December 18, 1903	Orange Athletic Club	Oreos Athletic Club	22–0
For 2nd place	December 19, 1903	Watertown Red & Black	Orange Athletic Club	11–0

==== Local series ====
A parallel tournament for the local New York City championship, taking place on the same days and in the same format as the main tournament, was won by the Olympic Athletic Club. The other participants were the Knickerbocker Athletic Club, Mohawk Athletic Club and the St. Peter's Lyceum.

== Legacy ==
O'Rourke canceled the event after the 1903 series. He was largely disappointed by the lack of attendance at the series. The largest crowd over six days was only 2,500, which was for a high school football game. Today the uniform worn from Harry Mason from All-Syracuse is on display at the Pro Football Hall of Fame. The Orange Athletic Club would evolve into the Orange Tornadoes (and later Newark Tornadoes) of the National Football League in 1929 and 1930. Through a series of changing leagues and revivals, the franchise was shuttered after the 1970 season, ending its life as the Orlando Panthers of the Atlantic Coast Football League. The Watertown Red & Black still exists today as members of the Empire Football League.
