= Frank "Buck" O'Neill =

American football player and coach (1875–1958)

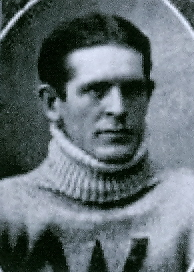
- O'Neill in 1901

Biographical details
- Born: March 6, 1875; Syracuse, New York, U.S.
- Died: April 21, 1958 (aged 83); Hamilton, New York, U.S.

Playing career
- 1899–1901: Williams
- 1902: Syracuse Athletic Club
- Position: End

Coaching career (HC unless noted)
- 1902: Colgate
- 1903: Williams
- 1904–1905: Colgate
- 1906–1907: Syracuse
- 1913–1915: Syracuse
- 1917–1919: Syracuse
- 1920–1922: Columbia

Head coaching record
- Overall: 87–45–9
- College Football Hall of Fame; Inducted in 1951 (profile)

Frank J. "Buck" O'Neill (March 6, 1875 – April 21, 1958) was an American football player and coach. He served as head football coach at Colgate University (1902, 1904–1905), Williams College (1903), Syracuse University (1906–1907, 1913–1915, 1917–1919), and Columbia University (1920–1922), compiling a career college football coaching record of 87–45–9. O'Neill was a two-sport athlete at Williams College where he played football and ran track. He was inducted into the College Football Hall of Fame as a coach in 1951.

== College athlete ==
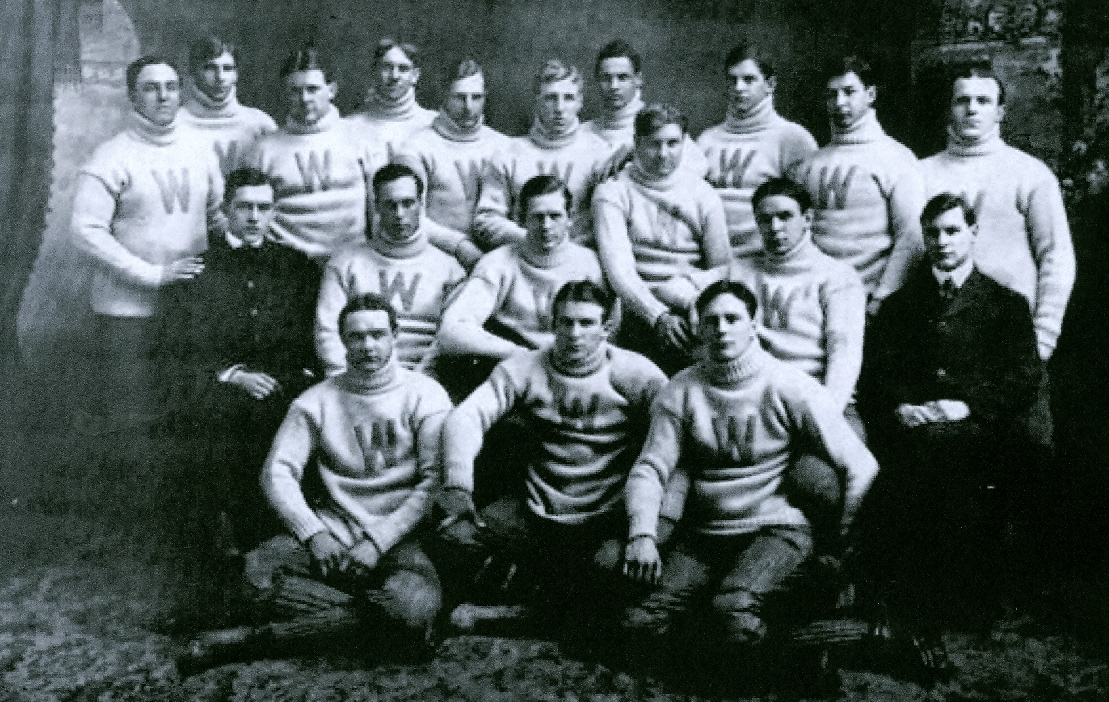
1901 Williams College football team captained by O'Neill

O'Neill was a two-sport athlete at Williams College in Williamstown, Massachusetts.

He lettered in football in 1899, 1900, and 1901 and served as captain his senior year under coach J. J. Hazen. The Williams College team that O'Neill captained had an overall record of 6–4 with losses to Harvard, Dartmouth, Columbia, and Army. Even with those losses, the O'Neill-led team went on to win the 1901 Tricollegiante Football Association championship, with victories over league rivals Wesleyan and Amherst. O'Neill lettered three times in track where he ran the 440-yard race.

As in football, he captained the track team his senior year. O'Neill placed third in the 440 at the 1901 New England Intercollegiate Athletic Association annual championship at the Worcester Oval in Worcester, Massachusetts. Williams College won the meet by less than a point.

== College coach ==
O'Neill was the tenth head football coach at Colgate University and held that position for three seasons between 1902 and 1905. He coached at Syracuse University at three different times. After 1915, the year O'Neill founded his law practice in New York City, he had to cut back on his coaching duties. In his last three years at Syracuse, he acted more as an advisor than a full-time coach. Even with this arrangement, he was successful including in 1919 when the Orange gave Pittsburgh its first loss in five years.

O'Neill moved to Columbia for 1920 season. Since his law office and his new team were in the New York City, he was able to spend more time with his football team. Unlike the previous football coaches at Columbia, O'Neill did not have to be a member of the physical education department. The goal for Columbia was to restore football to the standing it had when the last nationally-known coach Foster Sanford resigned in 1904. O'Neill guided Columbia to a winning record in his last of three years. He left to devote his full-time to his law practice after the 1922 season. In his last game at Columbia, he suffered one of the worst losses in his career, a 59–6 blowout to his old school, Colgate, on Thanksgiving Day. O'Neill's overall coaching record was 81–41–8. He was inducted in 1951 into the College Football Hall of Fame, where he is a charter member.

== Professional football coach ==
In 1902, O'Neill resurrected the Syracuse Athletic Club, to take part in the 1902 World Series of Football, held at Madison Square Garden. O'Neill conducted daily practices in preparation for the series. Syracuse then defeated the "New York" team in what has been called the first indoor professional football game. The final score of the game was recorded as 6–0, but in reality it was 5–0, since touchdowns only counted for five points in 1902 and Syracuse's Pop Warner missed the extra point. Warner later suffered a head injury and was replaced by "New York's" Blondy Wallace. Syracuse went on to win the Series with a 36–0 victory over the Orange Athletic Club.

== Head coaching record ==
Year	Team	Overall	Conference	Standing	Bowl/playoffs
Colgate (Independent) (1902)
1902	Colgate	5–3–1			
Williams Ephs (Independent) (1903)
1903	Williams	6–4–1			
Williams:		6–4–1			
Colgate (Independent) (1904–1905)
1904	Colgate	8–1–1			
1905	Colgate	5–4			
Colgate:		18–8–2			
Syracuse Orangemen (Independent) (1906–1907)
1906	Syracuse	6–3			
1907	Syracuse	5–3–1			
Syracuse Orangemen (Independent) (1913–1915)
1913	Syracuse	6–4			
1914	Syracuse	5–3–2			
1915	Syracuse	9–1–2			
Syracuse Orangemen (Independent) (1917–1919)
1917	Syracuse	8–1–1			
1918	Syracuse	5–1			
1919	Syracuse	8–3			
Syracuse:		52–19–6			
Columbia Lions (Independent) (1920–1922)
1920	Columbia	4–4			
1921	Columbia	2–6			
1922	Columbia	5–4			
Columbia:		11–14			
Total:		87–45–9			

== See also ==
- List of college football head coaches with non-consecutive tenure
