= New York Olympic Athletic Club football team =

The New York Olympic Athletic Club football team was an early semi-professional football team based in New York City. The team was founded by club owner, Roderick McMahon. In 1903, it won a local championship tournament featuring clubs from Greater New York City, held at Madison Square Garden at the same time as the 1903 World Series of Football. The team defeated the Mohawk Athletic Club 12–0 in the championship game.
