= Madison Square Garden (1890) =

Former arena in Manhattan, New York

Madison Square Garden II
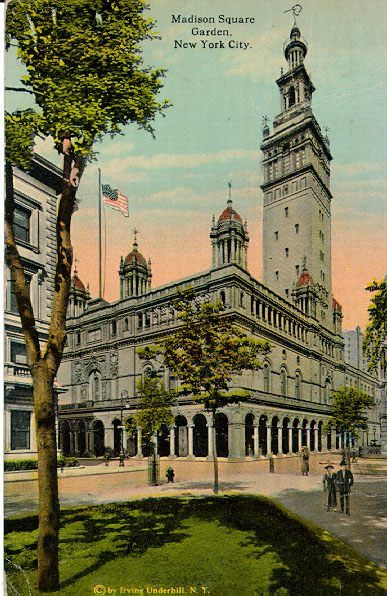
- Interactive map of Madison Square Garden II
- Full name: Madison Square Garden
- Location: Manhattan, New York City
- Coordinates: 40°44′34″N 73°59′08″W
- Capacity: 8,000

Construction
- Opened: June 1, 1891
- Closed: 1925
- Demolished: 1926
- Architect: McKim, Mead & White
- Builder: David H. King, Jr.

Madison Square Garden (1890–1926) was an indoor arena in New York City, the second by that name, and the second and last to be located at 26th Street and Madison Avenue in Manhattan. Opened in 1890 at the cost of about $500,000, it replaced the first Madison Square Garden, and hosted numerous events, including boxing matches, orchestral performances, light operas and romantic comedies, the annual French Ball, both the Barnum and the Ringling circuses, and the 1924 Democratic National Convention, which nominated John W. Davis after 103 ballots. The building closed in 1925, and was replaced by the third Madison Square Garden at Eighth Avenue and 50th Street, which was the first to be located away from Madison Square.

== History ==
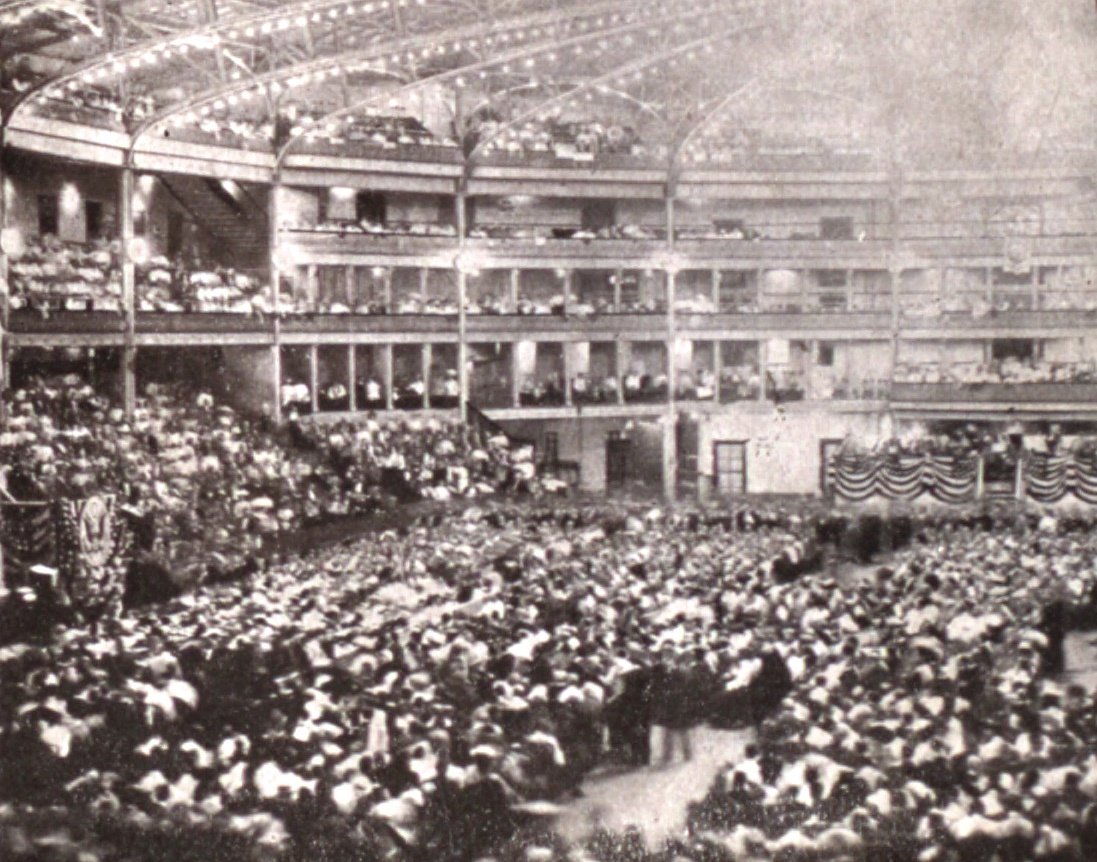
The interior of Madison Square Garden at night, c. 1905

Madison Square Garden II, as it has come to be called in retrospect, was designed by noted architect Stanford White, who kept an apartment there. In 1906 White was murdered in the Garden's rooftop restaurant by millionaire Harry Kendall Thaw over White's affair with Thaw's wife, the well-known actress Evelyn Nesbit, who claimed White had raped her when she was 16. The resulting sensational press coverage of the scandal caused Thaw's trial to be one of the first Trials of the Century.

The new building, which replaced an antiquated open-air structure that was previously a railroad passenger depot, was built by a syndicate which included J. P. Morgan, Andrew Carnegie, P. T. Barnum, Darius Mills, James Stillman and W. W. Astor. White gave them a Beaux-Arts structure with a Moorish feel, including a minaret-like tower modeled after Giralda, the bell tower of the Cathedral of Seville – soaring 32 stories – the city's second tallest building at the time – dominating Madison Square Park. It was 200 feet (61 m) by 485 feet (148 m), and the main hall, which was the largest in the world, measured 200 feet (61 m) by 350 feet (110 m), with permanent seating for 8,000 people and floor space for thousands more. It had a 1200-seat theatre, a concert hall with a capacity of 1500, the largest restaurant in the city and a roof garden cabaret. The final cost for the building, which the New York Times called "one of the great institutions of the town, to be mentioned along with Central Park and the bridge of Brooklyn" was $3 million.

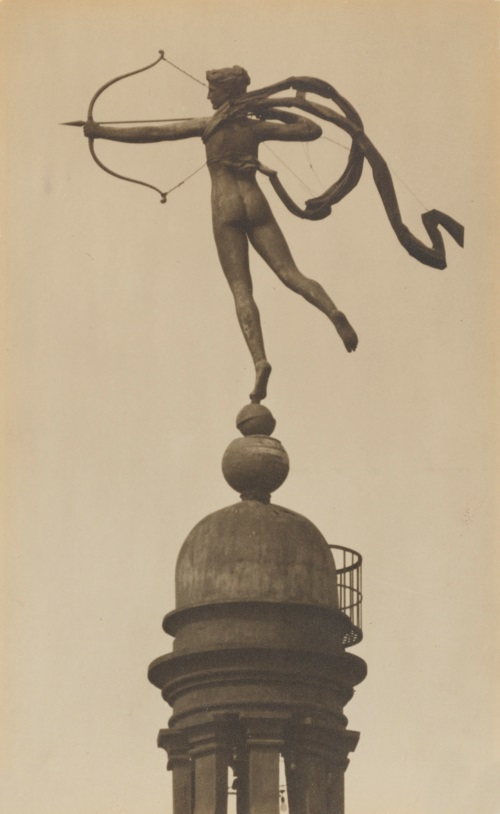
Augustus Saint-Gaudens' statue of Diana

Topping the Garden's tower was a statue of Diana, by noted sculptor Augustus Saint-Gaudens, which caused Madison Square Park to become known as "Diana's little wooded park". One of the possible models for Diana was Julia Baird, a well-known artist's model. The original gilt copper statue was 18 ft (5.5 m) tall, and weighed 1,800 lb (820 kg), and spun with the wind; Saint-Gaudens had draped the statue in cloth, but this was soon blown away. The statue was put in place in 1891, but was soon thought to be too large by Saint-Gaudens and White. It was removed and placed on top of a building at The World's Columbian Exposition in Chicago, but the bottom half was destroyed by a fire after the close of the Exposition, and the top half was lost. In 1893, a hollow second version of the statue, 13 ft (4.0 m) tall and made of gilded copper, replaced the original. This is now at the Philadelphia Museum of Art, and a copy is in the Metropolitan Museum of Art. Saint-Gaudens made several smaller variants in bronze, one of which was on display in the entryway of both Madison Square Garden III, built in 1925, and the current Madison Square Garden.

The opening of the new arena was attended by over 17,000 people – who paid up to $50 for tickets to the event – including J.P. Morgan, the Pierponts, the Whitneys and General William Tecumseh Sherman.

== Sports ==
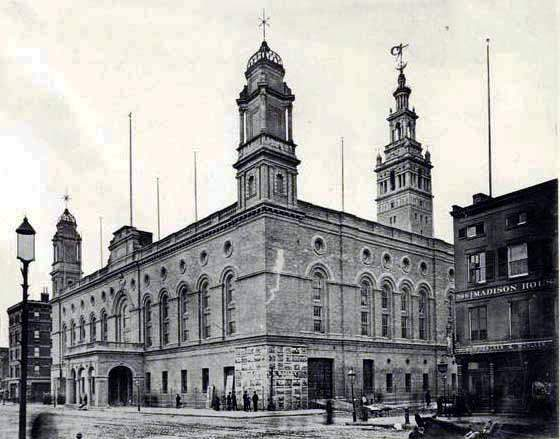
Another view of the exterior

In 1902 and 1903, the Garden hosted the World Series of Football, which is best remembered for showcasing the first indoor professional football games. The 1902 event involved five teams. The Knickerbocker Athletic Club, "New York team", Syracuse Athletic Club and the Warlow Athletic Club represented New York state. Meanwhile, the Orange Athletic Club represented New Jersey. The eventual winner of the 1902 series was the Syracuse Athletic Club. The event returned to the Garden in 1903 for the second and final time. The 1903 series featured the Knickerbocker Athletic Club, Olympic Athletic Club, Oreos Athletic Club and Watertown Red & Black representing New York state. Meanwhile, the Orange Athletic Club represented New Jersey, and the Franklin Athletic Club represented western Pennsylvania. The Franklin Athletic Club would go on to claim the event's final title.

On January 8, 1909, Matthew Maloney finished ahead of James Crowley and Sidney Hatch in an indoor marathon before 5,000 "wildly cheering" spectators held within the Garden. Maloney was reported to have set a new indoor record for the event (2:54:45.4).

The Millrose Games were first held at the arena in 1914.

During the 1921–22 season when they played in the Eastern Basketball League and first half of the 1922–23 season when they played in the Metropolitan Basketball League, the Original Celtics franchise would host home professional basketball games within this rendition of the Madison Square Garden in a time where the sport would be much different than what it is in the present day era. (The Original Celtics would later host games in the third rendition of the Madison Square Garden when they eventually ended up playing in the American Basketball League.)

The Garden continued to host The Westminster Kennel Club's annual dog show. This championship is the third-longest running U.S. sporting event (behind only the Kentucky Derby and Kentucky Oaks).

Boxing has a long history at Madison Square Garden. The original Garden presented boxing matches even before they were technically legal, calling them "exhibitions" or "illustrated lectures". Among the many events which were held in the new Garden were a number of significant boxing matchups. A bout between defending heavyweight champion Jess Willard and challenger Frank Moran on March 25, 1916, which brought in $152,000, the largest Garden take to that date. Also, Jack Dempsey's knockout of Bill Brennan in the 12th round on December 14, 1920.

Professional wrestling was also successfully staged at the venue, as with later incarnations of the Garden. The World Heavyweight Championship derives from George Hackenschmidt's victory in two straight falls at the Garden over Tom Jenkins on May 4, 1905. Joe Stecher regained the championship from Earl Caddock at the venue on January 30, 1920, the earliest American professional wrestling match to survive on film. The venue also hosted the next two title changes, Ed "Strangler" Lewis' victory over Stecher on December 13, 1920, and his subsequent loss of the championship to Stanislaus Zbyszko on May 6, 1921.

From 1899 until its demolition, Madison Square Garden hosted the Six Days of New York, an annual six-day racing event of track cycling.

== Demolition ==
Despite its importance to the New York cultural scene in the early 20th century, Madison Square Garden II was never any more of a financial success than the original Garden was, and the New York Life Insurance Company, which held the mortgage on it, decided to tear it down to make way for a new headquarters building, which would become the landmark Cass Gilbert-designed New York Life Building. Construction on the new building began in 1926, and was completed in 1928.

== In popular culture ==
- The 1924 Anita Stewart film The Great White Way featured the second Garden.
- The 1932 film Madison Square Garden starred Jack Oakie, Zasu Pitts and William Boyd, who would later find fame as "Hopalong Cassidy".
- The 1975 novel and 1981 film Ragtime both feature the second Garden as a key location. In the film, recreations of the rooftop garden shooting and tower statue are shown.
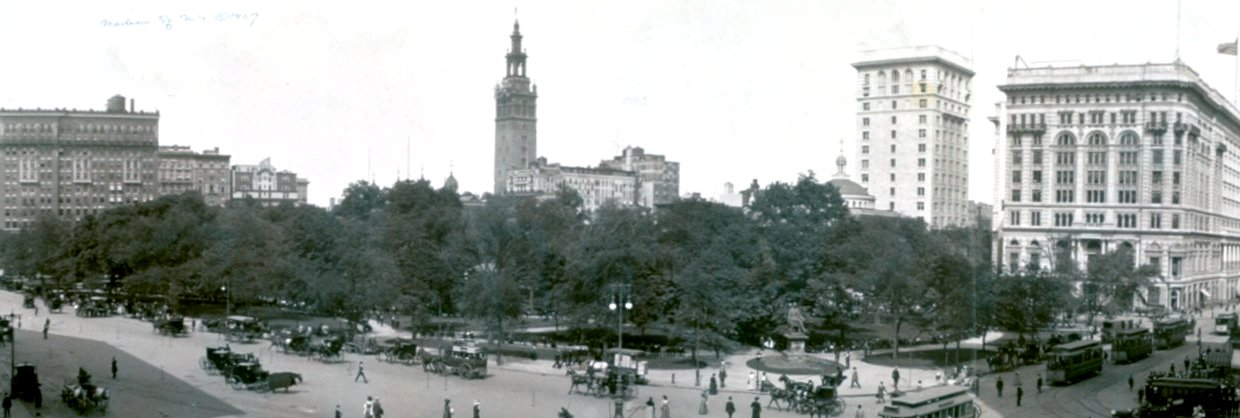
The 32-story tower of Madison Square Garden dominates the skyline over Madison Square and Madison Square Park in this 1908 image.

== See also ==
- Madison Square
- Madison Square Garden (1879)
- Madison Square Garden (1925)
- Madison Square Garden (1968)
- Madison Square Garden Bowl
