= Syracuse Pros =

Defunct American football team

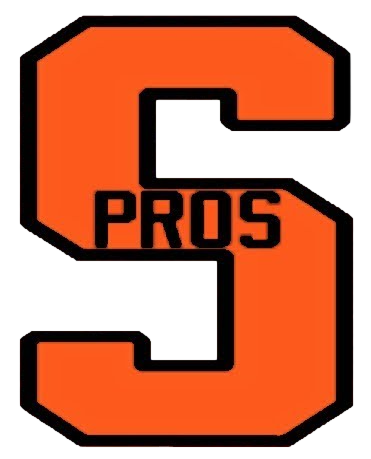
Logo

General information
- Founded: 1921
- Folded: 1921
- Stadium: Star Park
- Headquartered: Syracuse New York, United States
- Colors: Black, orange

Personnel
- Head coach: Mike Purdy

Nickname
- Syracuse Eleven

Team history
- Syracuse Pros (1921)

League / conference affiliations
- Independent

A nameless professional American football team, based in Syracuse, New York and generically known as the Syracuse Pros or Syracuse Eleven, was once thought to have joined the American Professional Football Association (now the National Football League (NFL) for the 1921 season. The team was coached by Mike Purdy and managed by Andy Friedman. Syracuse University multi-sport standout John Barsha was the team's franchise player.

== NFL debate ==
An article posted in the Professional Football Researchers Association journal Coffin Corner in 1992 considered the fact that Syracuse said they were in the league as persuasive evidence that they were, claiming that since professional football was not that popular at the time, the team had nothing to gain from lying about their status (even though the team's announcement trumpeted the ability to play "the leading professional football teams of the country"). This hypothesis does not take into account the possibility of the team being turned down for league membership, or dropping out before the season started.

This hypothesis has not been accepted in modern times. The National Football League itself does not consider Syracuse to have been a member of the league in its official league records. Research centered on the Tonawanda Kardex suggests that the team was still known as All-Syracuse, an independent team, and it is sometimes said that the Rochester Jeffersons only won two games against NFL opponents in their existence, against Tonawanda and the Columbus Panhandles—even though Rochester beat Syracuse in 1921. The game is counted in Syracuse's records but not Rochester's. A third game, against the Washington Senators, was also played against a league opponent.

No record of the league admitting a team from Syracuse to the league or removing them from the league exists; only a statement from the team itself says it was (and even that uses the erroneous name "National Professional Football Association"; in 1921 it was the American Professional Football Association and changed its name to the National Football League in 1922). Only the Chicago Tigers, who played seven games against NFL teams during the 1920 NFL season, have been generally recognized as league members without having formally been admitted to or removed from the league. (A few teams, such as the New York Brickley Giants, have either admission or removal records missing, but not both.) At least one team, that year's runner-up Buffalo All-Americans, refused to recognize their membership and canceled two games against them, and possibly pressured the Akron Pros into canceling a game against Syracuse as well.

== 1921 Syracuse Pros season ==
The Pros opened their 1921 campaign, with former two-time college All American Doc Alexander playing for the team, with a scoreless tie against Tonawanda at Star Park. A touchdown pass from player-coach Mike Purdy to Lew Andreas in the last minute of play was called back on a holding penalty, costing Syracuse a win. Only 800 spectators showed up to the game because of inclement weather. The next two games were to be on the road against the AFPA's Buffalo All-Americans and New York Brickley Giants. However, both were later canceled for reason that are unknown. To fill the first open date, manager Andy Friedman lined up a game with the Oakdales, a local semi-pro team. Syracuse then coasted to an easy 19–0 victory before a slightly improved crowd of 1,000.

For the next home game, Syracuse was to play the defending AFPA champions, the Akron Pros. However a few days later, Akron canceled the game in order to play the Rochester Jeffersons. In return, Syracuse played an incarnation of the Akron Indians, the one all-Native American football team, led by Suey Welch. The Pros defeated the Indians 47–0 in front of only 1,500 people. The Pros then prepared for a series of tough games against Rochester and Buffalo. However both teams canceled their games against Syracuse. A week later the Pros finally played their second game against an APFA team. However this game against the Washington Senators resulted in a 20–7 Syracuse loss. The Pros ended their only possible AFPA-NFL season with 12–0 loss to Rochester, them with an APFA record of 0–2–1.

== Ties to other Syracuse teams ==
What is known for certain is that organized football in Syracuse had been around since at least 1890, with the formation of the Syracuse Athletic Club. Syracuse A.C. existed from 1890 to 1900, and according to PFRA contributor Kenneth Crippen had a tumultuous but prolific existence. A new "All-Syracuse" team was organized in 1902, under Frank "Buck" O'Neill, and is notable for winning one of the first pro football championships; using ringers such as Pop Warner and members of the Watertown Red & Black, All-Syracuse upset the favorite "New York" team in round 1 of the 1902 World Series of Pro Football and went on to win the tournament. Since the tournament was held in New York City's Madison Square Garden, All-Syracuse played in what has been called the first professional indoor football game. Another Syracuse-based team, the "Syracuse Stars," is listed in the Rochester Jeffersons' 1920 season records, and is more likely than not the same team as the Syracuse Pros.

== Season-by-season ==
Year	W	L	T	Finish	Coach
1921	0	2	1	19th	Mike Purdy
Totals	0	2	1		

== Players ==
This is a list of known players who played for the Syracuse Pros in 1921. It includes players that have played at least one match with the team:

- Doc Alexander
- Lew Andreas
- John Barsha
- Eddie Delaney
- Johnny Dooley
- Roddy Dunn
- Andy Friedman
- Clarence Halloran
- Chris Lehrer
- Bob Martin
- Frank Matteo
- Mike Purdy
- Billy Rafter
- Tubby Rosecrans
- Bill Smithson
- Bryant Thompson
- Leslie Travis
