= Bob Shiring =

American football player (1870–1957)

Profile
- Position: Center

Personal information
- Born: April 13, 1876; Pittsburgh, Pennsylvania, U.S.
- Died: July 23, 1957 (aged 81); Pittsburgh, Pennsylvania, U.S.

Career information
- College: None

Career history

Playing
- 1897: Marquette A.C. (Turtle Creek Indians)
- 1898: Swissvale A.C.
- 1899: East Pittsburgh A.A.
- 1899: Lalus A.C.
- 1900: East End A.A.
- 1901: Homestead Library & A.C.
- 1902: Pittsburgh Stars
- 1903: East End A.A.
- 1903–1906: Massillon Tigers
- 1907: Massillon All-Stars
- 1907–1910: Pittsburgh Lyceum

Coaching
- 1907–1910: Pittsburgh Lyceum

Awards and highlights
- Grantland Rice's Early Era All-Pro Team; 3× Captain of the Massillon Tigers; 4× Ohio League champion (1903, 1904, 1905, 1906); National Football League champion (1902); W. Pennsylvania Football Circuit champion (1901)

Charles Robert Shiring (April 13, 1876 – July 23, 1957) was a professional football player from Pittsburgh, Pennsylvania. He began his professional playing career with the Homestead Library & Athletic Club in 1901. In 1902, he played for the Pittsburgh Stars of the first National Football League (NFL) who ended up winning the league title. Since the Stars consisted of the best professional players from western Pennsylvania at the time, it can be said that Shiring was considered the best at his position, center, in the region (and probably in the country). However Shiring is best known for playing for the Massillon Tigers from 1903 until 1907. He finally served from 1907 to 1910 as a player-coach for the Pittsburgh Lyceum, Pittsburgh's last championship professional football team until the 1970s.

== Playing career ==
Shiring began playing amateur football at least as early as 1897 for various local teams, including the 1899 local amateur champion Lalus Athletic Club, where he took up the center position. In 1901, Shiring was hired by the Homestead Library & Athletic Club to fill in for the injured Pete Overfield. From the moment he took the field, Shiring never left the Homestead line-up. The following season, he played alongside Christy Mathewson of the New York Baseball Giants for the Pittsburgh Stars of the first National Football League. In 1903, Shiring travelled to Ohio and continued his playing career with the Massillon Tigers of the Ohio League. He played for the Tigers until 1907 and served as a team captain for three of his four seasons in Massillon. A photograph of Shiring, as the Massillon captain, is currently hanging inside of the Pro Football Hall of Fame, located in Canton, Ohio. Massillon residents reportedly attempted to persuade Shiring to move to their town during and after his time Tigers, however he returned to Pennsylvania in 1907. That season, he became the player-coach for the Pittsburgh Lyceum football team. Throughout his career, Shiring refused to wear shoulder pads while playing. When asked why he refused to wear pads, Shiring responded by saying, "because they hinder me getting through the line." His only padding concession was that he would wear shin guards.

=== Role in the Canton Bulldogs–Massillon Tigers betting scandal ===
In 1906 Shiring was a figure in a betting scandal between the Massillon Tigers and the rival Canton Bulldogs. The Canton Bulldogs–Massillon Tigers betting scandal was the first major scandal in professional football. It was the first known case of professional gamblers attempting to fix a professional sport. It refers to an allegation made by a Massillon newspaper charging the Bulldogs' coach, Blondy Wallace, and Tigers' end Walter East of conspiring to fix a two-game championship series between the two clubs. When the Tigers won the second and final game of a championship series and were named pro football's champions, Wallace was accused of throwing the game for Canton.

However E. J. Stewart, the Tigers' coach and the editor of the Massillon Independent, charged that an actual attempt was made to bribe some of the Tiger players and that Wallace had been involved. His accusation was that an attempt had been made to bribe some Massillion players before the first game. According to Stewart, Tiny Maxwell and Shiring of Massillon had been solicited to throw the first game by East. Maxwell and Shiring then reported the offer to the Tigers' manager and the scandal ended before it began. The scandal was blamed for ruining professional football in Ohio until the mid-1910s.

== Outside of football ==
Shiring left school at the age of 13 and worked with his brothers at the Westinghouse Air Brake Company. The job resulted in him moving his family from Turtle Creek, Pennsylvania to nearby Wilmerding. He built his family's house in 1898, which was picked up and moved across the street in the 1960s, to make room for an expressway. The house remains in that location to this day.

Shiring later spent 50 years as a borough official in Wilmerding, Pennsylvania, where he served as the town's squire, which is the equivalent of a magistrate, in addition to being the elected Wilmerding's tax collector in 1903. He also opened a business, working in the insurance and real estate fields. He fathered nine children and remained close to his home in Wilmerding.

On July 23, 1957 Shiring died in a Pittsburgh hospital.
