= J. J. Wise =

American politician (1867–1930)

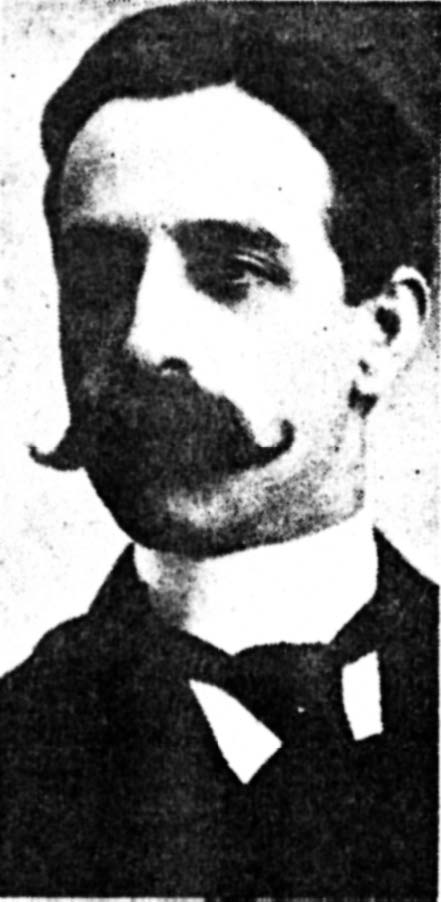
- Wise, c. 1905

Profile
- Position: Manager

Personal information
- Born: January 15, 1867; Massillon, Ohio, U.S.
- Died: April 7, 1930 (aged 63); Massillon, Ohio, U.S.

Career history
- 1903–1906: Massillon Tigers

Awards and highlights
- 4x Ohio League Champion (1903, 1904, 1905, 1906); Massillon Tigers Co-Founder

Other information

Member of the Ohio Senate from the 21st district
- In office 1913–1913

Mayor of Massillon, Ohio
- In office 1898–1902

Personal details
- Resting place: Massillon Cemetery
- Party: Republican
- Spouse: Elizabeth Axel (m. 1887)
- Children: 1

Jacob J. Wise (January 15, 1867 - April 7, 1930) was a Republican mayor of Massillon, Ohio from 1898 until 1902. He was also the Clerk of Massillon City Council for Massillion from 1903 until 1910. In 1912 he was elected to Ohio Senate for the 80th General Assembly.

== Early life ==
Jacob J. Wise was born on January 15, 1867, in Massillon, Ohio, to John Jacob Wise. His father was an immigrant from Milheim, Baden, Germany. He was educated at public schools in Massillon.

== Business and professional football ==
Wise began work at the age of 12, as a cashier in one of the leading dry goods stores in Massillon. This led his later career in the mercantile business as the director and vice president of A. J. Humberger & Son Dry Goods Company of Massillon. He later became a founder, and later manager, of the professional American football team, the Massillon Tigers of the Ohio League. In 1903, Wise, who was the Massillon Clerk of Courts, organized a group of 35 local business leaders who met in the Hotel Sailer in downtown Massillon, to form a professional football team. He then led a committee to secure the necessary funds for a new football and jerseys that were nearly the same color. Massillon's local venders only had a sufficient quantity of one jersey style to outfit an entire team. Those jerseys imitated the orange and black striped attire of the Princeton Tigers. So the new Massillon team was christened the "Tigers."

By 1905 Wise was the manager of the Tigers, who won the 1903, 1904 and 1905 Ohio League titles. He remained the manager until after Tigers won the 1906 Ohio League championship. Immediately afterwards, rumors of a betting fix tainted the championship. Major professional football would cease in Ohio until 1911.

== Politics ==
Wise was a Republican. He served as mayor of Massillon from 1898 to 1902. He worked as clerk of the Stark County courts from 1903 to 1910. Wise was elected to the 21st district of the Ohio Senate. During his time in the Senate, Wise was chairman of the Senate Committee on Drainage and Irrigation, and a member of the following committees: Benevolent Institutions, County Affairs, Finance, Geological Survey, Labor, Manufactures and Commerce, Military Affairs, Public Works, State Buildings, and Temperance. He also served as secretary of the Labor and Finance Committees. He was then re-elected to the legislature in 1914 for the 81st General Assembly.

Wise was known for his support for a park system in Massillon.

== Family ==
In 1887, Wise married Elizabeth Axel, of Ashland, Ohio. The couple would go on to have a daughter, Margery Whitman.

Wise died on April 7, 1930, in Massillon. He was buried at Massillon Cemetery.
