= Ashbaugh =

Ashbaugh is a surname. Notable people with the surname include:

- David R. Ashbaugh (born 1946), Canadian police officer known for his extensive research on the friction ridge identification
- Dennis Ashbaugh (born 1946), American painter and artist from New York
- Russell "Busty" Ashbaugh (1889–1953), football player at Brown University
- Russell "Pete" Ashbaugh (1921–2009), football standout at the University of Notre Dame
