= 1906 Canton Bulldogs season =

American football team season

- Head coach: Blondy Wallace
- Home stadium: Mahaffey Park

Results
- Record: 10-1

The 1906 Canton Bulldogs season was their second season in the Ohio League. The team finished 10–1, giving them second place in the league. The championship series between the Bulldogs and the Massillon Tigers was rumoured to be fixed.

== Schedule ==
Game	Date	Opponent	Result	Record
1	October 7	Fredericksburg	W 57–0	1–0
2	October 13	Moundsville, W.Va.	W 14–0	2–0
3	October 14	at Toledo Athletic Association	W 31–0	3–0
4	October 20	Pittsburgh Lyceum	W 8–0	4–0
5	October 21	Benwood (W.Va.) Athletic Club	W 49–0	5–0
6	October 27	at Pittsburgh Lyceum	W 12–0	6–0
7	October 28	Broadway A.C. of Cleveland	W 57–0	7–0
8	November 4	Deering Maroons	W 57–0	8–0
9	November 16	Massillon Tigers	W 10–5	9–0
10	November 24	at Massillon Tigers	L 6–13	9–1
11	November 29	Latrobe Athletic Association	W 16–0	10–1
