= Cy Rigler =

American baseball umpire (1882–1935)

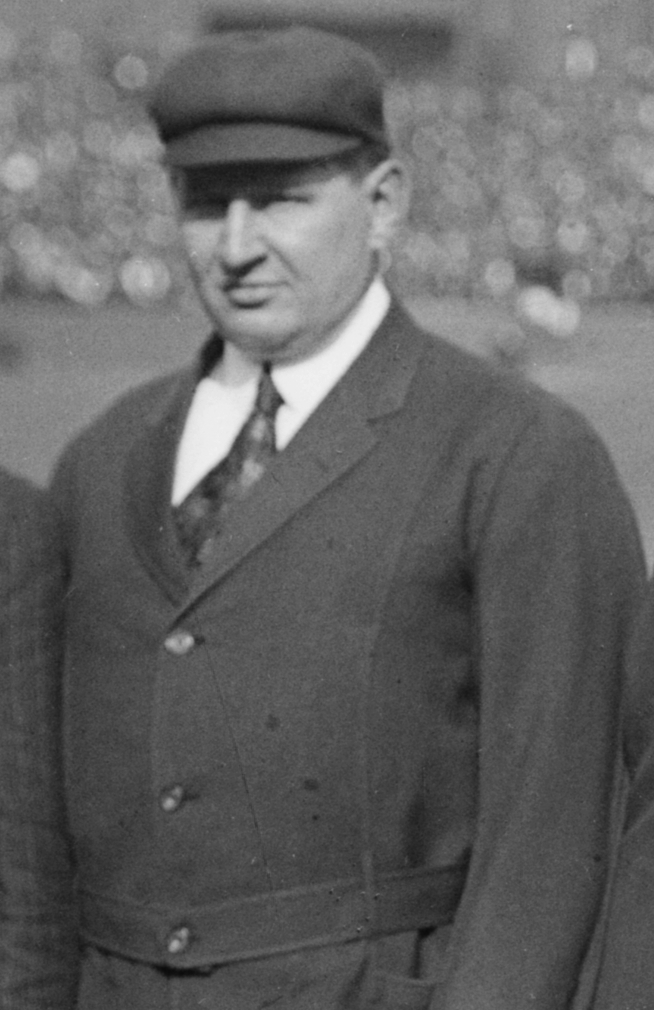
- Rigler at the 1915 World Series
- Born: May 16, 1882; Massillon, Ohio, U.S.
- Died: December 21, 1935 (aged 53); Philadelphia, Pennsylvania, U.S.
- Occupation: Umpire
- Years active: 1906 – 1935
- Employer: National League
- Football career

Profile
- Position: Tackle

Career history
- Massillon Tigers (1903)

Awards and highlights
- Ohio League champion (1903)

Charles "Cy" Rigler (May 16, 1882 – December 21, 1935) was an American umpire in Major League Baseball who worked in the National League from 1906 to 1935. His total of 4,144 games ranked fourth in major league history when he retired, and his 2,468 games as a plate umpire still place him third behind his NL contemporaries Bill Klem (3,543) and Hank O'Day (2,710). Rigler is tied with O'Day for the second most World Series as an umpire (10), trailing only Klem's 18. Rigler has also been credited with instituting the practice of using arm signals when calling balls and strikes.

== Early life ==
Born in Massillon, Ohio, Rigler never played baseball in his younger days, although he played pro football briefly in 1903 as a tackle for the Massillon Tigers. As a young man he worked as a machinist, and also as a police officer and fireman, and was encouraged toward work as an umpire because his thick build served well in quelling disputes on the field between the ironworkers who formed local teams.

== Umpiring career ==
He advanced quickly in the field, working in the Central League in 1904 at age 22; in 1905 his excellent work was noted by scouts for NL president Harry Pulliam, and he was hired by the NL late in the 1906 season, becoming the youngest regular umpire in that league's history.

His first major league game was on September 27, 1906, with the Brooklyn Dodgers visiting the Chicago Cubs; he became a member of the NL's regular staff in April 1907.

== Innovations and influence ==
While working in the minor leagues in 1905, Rigler had initiated the practice of using arm signals to note balls and strikes, so that those in the outfield would more clearly follow the action; by the time he arrived in the majors, he discovered that the practice had become so widespread that it had preceded him there.

Rigler joined the majors at a time when the use of one umpire in a game was still common; by the time his career ended, three umpires had become standard.

His solid frame was a decided asset in an era in which players were decidedly more aggressive in their dealings with umpires; and umpires in the NL were not as clearly defended by league officials as those in the American League, although they were also given a free rein in resolving disputes and in allowing their own personalities to emerge.

Rigler ejected Johnny Evers from 22 ballgames. As of June 2020, no umpire had ejected any person more times. The second place umpire-competitor combination had only 15 ejections.

== Baseball beyond officiating ==
He not only proved skilled in officiating, but also became an expert in the design and groundskeeping of ballparks, and he laid out many of the most important parks in Cuba and elsewhere in Latin America by the early 1910s. In 1912 he was laying out the ballfield at the University of Virginia, while also serving as an assistant coach at the school, when he discovered pitcher Eppa Rixey and signed him for the Philadelphia Phillies.

The ensuing controversy over league umpires signing players for teams whose games they would be officiating led to the establishment of a rule barring umpires from also acting as scouts.

Rigler was highly regarded for his outgoing nature and for his ability to let criticism roll off his back without becoming visibly irritated. He allowed players and managers to make their arguments, and demonstrated a willingness to eject only the most egregious offenders.

== Major games and World Series ==
Rigler officiated in 10 World Series, second only to Bill Klem's 18: 1910, 1912, 1913, 1915, 1917, 1919, 1921, 1925, 1928 and 1930. He was also one of the umpires in the first All-Star Game in 1933. One of his most memorable calls came in the 1925 Series, when Earl Smith's long fly ball to right field in Game 3 reached Washington outfielder Sam Rice's glove just as he fell over the wall into the outfield bleachers. When Rice emerged from the crowd with the ball in his glove, Rigler's call of a catch and an out stoked controversy for decades as to whether Rice had indeed made the catch. Washington won the game 4–3, although they went on to lose the Series to Pittsburgh.

He was the base umpire on May 2, 1917, when Fred Toney of the Cincinnati Reds and Jim "Hippo" Vaughn of the Chicago Cubs pitched opposing no-hitters for 9 innings, with Vaughn finally giving up 2 hits and a run in the 10th inning to take the loss. Rigler was again the base umpire on August 25, 1922, when the Cubs defeated the Phillies 26–23 in the highest-scoring 9-inning game in history.

== Death and legacy ==
Rigler was promoted to supervisor of the NL staff in December 1935 following the death of Hank O'Day, but he never got the opportunity to fulfill his duties. He died less than two weeks later, following surgery for a brain tumor, in Philadelphia at age 53.

== See also ==
- List of Major League Baseball umpires (disambiguation)
