= Tom Gormley (American football) =

American football player and coach (1891–1951)

Profile
- Positions: Guard, tackle

Personal information
- Born: August 9, 1891; Bridgeport, Connecticut, U.S.
- Died: July 24, 1951 (aged 59); Washington, D.C., U.S.
- Listed height: 5 ft 11 in (1.80 m)
- Listed weight: 225 lb (102 kg)

Career information
- College: Catholic University; Georgetown; Ursinus; Villanova

Career history

Playing
- 1917–1919: Youngstown Patricians
- 1920: Canton Bulldogs
- 1920: Cleveland Tigers
- 1921: Washington Senators
- 1921: New York Brickley Giants

Coaching
- 1923–1924: Catholic University

Thomas Francis Gormley (August 9, 1891 – July 24, 1951) was an American football player and coach. He played in the American Professional Football League (AFPL)—now known as National Football League (NFL)—with the Canton Bulldogs, Cleveland Tigers, Washington Senators and the New York Brickley Giants. Brickley's New York Giants are not related to the modern-day New York Giants. He also played for the independent Youngstown Patricians from 1917 until 1919.

Gormley played college football at Catholic University of America, Georgetown University, Ursinus College and Villanova University. He later became the head coach of the Catholic Cardinals football team.

He was buried in Arlington National Cemetery.
