= Bill Laub =

American politician and coach (1878–1963)

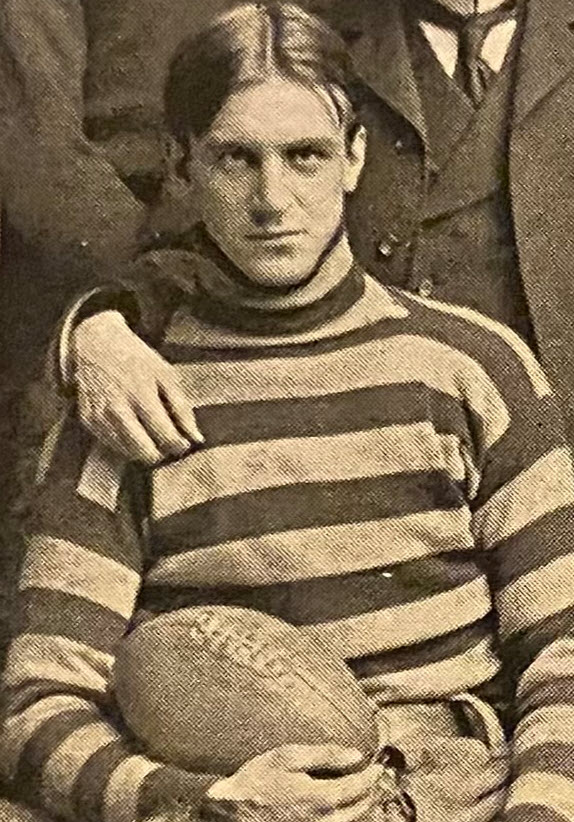

Profile
- Position: Tackle

Personal information
- Born: August 9, 1878; Cleveland, Ohio, U.S.
- Died: January 3, 1963 (aged 84); Massillon, Ohio, U.S.

Career history

Playing
- 1896–1900: Western Reserve
- 1902c–1904: Akron East Ends
- 1905: Canton Athletic Club

Coaching
- 1901: Western Reserve
- 1903: Akron (HS)
- 1904: Akron East Ends
- 1905: Canton Athletic Club

Awards and highlights
- Ohio League champion (1902)

William John Laub (August 9, 1878 – January 1, 1963) was the Mayor of Akron, Ohio, 1916–17, and an early professional American football player-coach. Laub was the first head coach of the Canton Bulldogs (known then as the Canton Athletic Club) and a player-coach for the Akron East Ends.

== Early life ==
After graduating high school in Akron in 1895, Laub attended both the undergraduate school and law school at Western Reserve in Cleveland, known today as Case Western Reserve University. Laub graduated with his bachelor's degree in 1900 and law degree in 1903.

== Football career ==
Laub played college football for three seasons from 1897–1900 for the Western Reserve football team and served as captain for two seasons. Laub later became their head coach for one season during 1901.

In 1902 Laub helped guide the Akron East Ends to the Ohio Independent Championship; the East Ends were an early powerhouse in Ohio football. During next two seasons, the East Ends finished in second place, losing both years to the Massillon Tigers in the championship games by scores of 11–0 and 6–5.

During the dismantling of the Akron East Ends, Laub became the first head coach of the Canton Bulldogs. To bolster its new team in 1905, Canton hired seven players away from the Akron East Ends, including Laub who would serve as the team's coach and tackle. On November 18, 1905, Canton traveled to Latrobe, Pennsylvania to play the Latrobe Athletic Association. The game ended in a 6–0 Canton loss. However during the game, Laub was severely hurt when he tore a muscle in his leg, ending his career. He was then replaced by Blondy Wallace as the team's tackle and coach.

== Political career ==
Laub was the Mayor of Akron, Ohio from 1916 to 1917.

== Legacy ==
Laub died in 1963 and is buried at Rose Hill Burial Park in Fairlawn, Ohio. He resided at 929 West Market St. in Akron, and the house is today used by the Junior League of Akron, donated by the Laub family in 1968.
