= Ben Pucci =

American football player (1925–2013)

- Pucci while with the Cleveland Browns in 1948

No. 42, 45
- Position: Tackle

Personal information
- Born: January 26, 1925; St. Louis, Missouri, U.S.
- Died: July 7, 2013 (aged 88); San Antonio, Texas, U.S.
- Listed height: 6 ft 4 in (1.93 m)
- Listed weight: 255 lb (116 kg)

Career information
- High school: Southwest (St. Louis)
- College: None

Career history
- Buffalo Bisons (1946); Chicago Rockets (1947); Cleveland Browns (1948)

Awards and highlights
- AAFC champion (1948)

Career statistics
- Games: 37
- Stats at Pro Football Reference

Benito Modesto "Ben" Pucci (January 26, 1925 – July 7, 2013) was an American professional football tackle who played three seasons for the Buffalo Bisons, Chicago Rockets and Cleveland Browns in the All-America Football Conference (AAFC) between 1946 and 1948.

Pucci Grew up in St. Louis and went to high school there, but did not attend college. He joined the Bisons in 1946, where he stayed for a year before moving to the Rockets and then the Browns in 1948. While he was with the Browns, the team posted a perfect record and won a third straight AAFC championship. He was sent to the AAFC's Baltimore Colts in 1949, but left the team after he was asked to take a pay cut. Following his football career, Pucci worked in transportation and eventually settled in San Antonio in 1980. He died there in 2013.

== Early life ==
Pucci grew up in The Hill, a historically Italian American neighborhood in St. Louis, and attended Southwest High School, where he played on the varsity football team for four years and was named an all-district and all-city player. He did not go to college after graduating. Pucci played for the Hollywood Rangers of the short-lived American Football League in 1944, and had to turn down an offer to join the football program at Tulane University the following year because he had lost his amateur status by playing professionally.

== Professional career ==
Pucci was given a chance to play for the Cleveland Rams of the National Football League in 1945, but decided not to take the offer. The Rams went on to win the 1945 NFL championship. Pucci joined the Buffalo Bisons of the All-America Football Conference (AAFC) in 1946, the league's first year of play, and played as a tackle in 11 games. The Bisons won just three games that year. Pucci moved in 1947 to the Chicago Rockets, another AAFC team, and played in 13 of the team's 14 games that season. The Rockets lost all but one of their games and ended with a 1–13 win–loss record.

Pucci was traded in early 1948 to the Cleveland Browns in exchange for tackle Roman Piskor and the rights to draft Notre Dame's Pete Ashbaugh. He played 12 games for the Browns, who had an undefeated season and won their third straight AAFC championship.

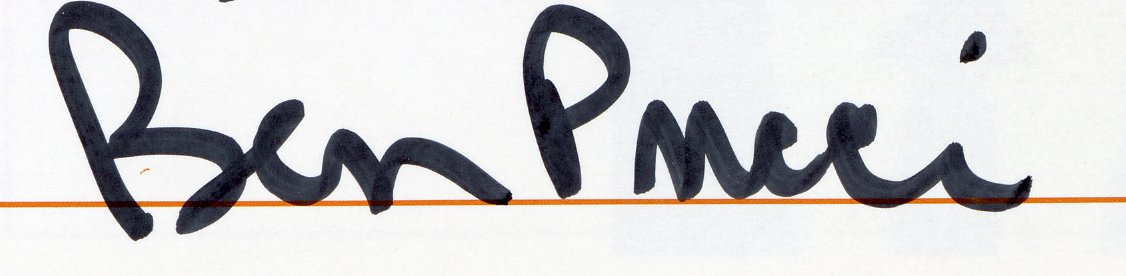

The Baltimore Colts, another AAFC team, bought Pucci from the Browns in 1949 along with two other tackles. Pucci played for the Colts for the first five games of the season, but quit after he and several other players were asked to take a pay cut.

== Later life and death ==
Pucci left football after quitting the Colts and started a career in the transportation industry. His career took him to California, Missouri, South Bend, Indiana and finally to San Antonio, Texas in 1980. He was a color commentator for the St. Louis Cardinals in the 1960s. He died in 2013 in San Antonio. He had two sons and a daughter with his wife Shirley. Pucci is a member of the walk of fame in The Hill in St. Louis.

== Bibliography ==
- Crippen, Kenneth R. (2009). The Original Buffalo Bills: A History of the All-America Football Conference Team, 1946-1949. Jefferson, NC: McFarland. ISBN 978-0-78644-619-3.
- Piascik, Andy (2007). The Best Show in Football: The 1946–1955 Cleveland Browns. Lanham, MD: Taylor Trade Publishing. ISBN 978-1-58979-571-6.
