= Baldy Wittman =

American football player

Profile
- Positions: Tackle, End

Personal information
- Born: c1871
- Died: Unknown

Career history
- 1903–1905: Massillon Tigers
- 1907: "All-Massillons"
- 1911: Massillon Tigers

Awards and highlights
- 1903 Ohio League Champs; 1904 Ohio League Champs; 1905 Ohio League Champs; 1907 Ohio League Champs

Julius "Baldy" Wittmann was an American professional football player in the Ohio League for the Massillon Tigers, as well as the Tigers 1907 spin-off team the "All-Massillions". When the Tigers were established in 1903, Wittmann was picked to start on the team at end, despite never playing the game before. Prior to his involvement with the Tigers, Wittman was the proprietor of a local cigar store and a spare-time police officer. His slogan for the cigar store was "our prices and the Massillon Tigers can't be beat".

Wittmann was a natural leader and an athlete who learned quickly. As a result, he was elected captain of the team during the 1903 season. During a December 5, 1903 game against the Akron East Ends, Wittman was reportedly assaulted by a gang of five men, until several Massillon fans came to his aid. During the 1904 season he was moved to the tackle position. In 1905, while Wittmann kept his title as team captain, Clark Schrontz was named as the team's "field captain".

In 1907, he was a member of the "All-Massillons". Wittmann and ex-Tiger, Frank Bast, were in the line-up for a 1911 version of the Massillon Tigers.
