= Walt Roepke =

American football player

Profile
- Positions: Tackle, End

Personal information
- Born: Akron, Ohio, U.S.
- Died: Unknown

Career history
- 1903: Akron Imperials
- 1903–1904: Massillon Tigers

Awards and highlights
- 1903 Ohio League Champs; 1904 Ohio League Champs

Walter Roepke was an American professional football player for the Akron Imperials and the Massillon Tigers. He played with these teams in the Ohio League, which was the direct predecessor to the modern National Football League. Roepke began the 1903 season as a member of the Imperials. However, the Massillion officials were very impressed with his play against the Tigers and shortly afterwards signed him to their team.

On Thanksgiving Day, Roepke scored three times during a 34-0 Tigers victory over Wooster College. He started the 1903 Ohio League title game against the Akron East Ends at fullback, however he was soon forced from the game after a kick by an East Ends player broke his nose. Massillon would go on to win the game by a score of 11-0 and clinch their first league title. On the train home, several Massillon fans took up a collection to pay for the medical bill for Roepke and his nose. He netted $40 as an "expression of gratitude."

Roepke returned to the Tigers in 1904. During Massillon's 148-0 victory over a team from Marion, Roepke returned a punt back for a touchdown. However late in game, he suffered a fractured collar bone. After having a broken nose in 1903 and a broken collar bone in 1904, Roepke reportedly gave up football.
