= Robert Burch (American football) =

American football player, coach, and judge (1886–1967)

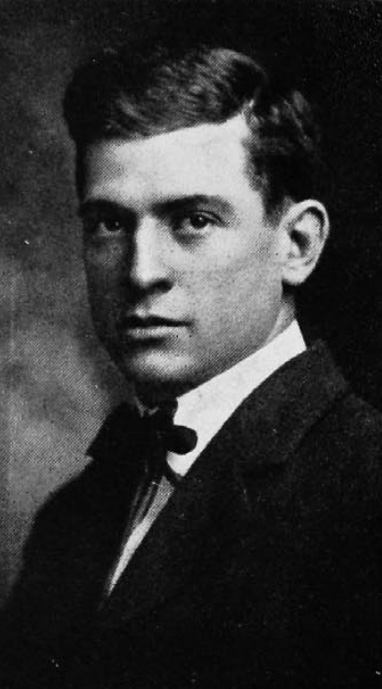
- Burch pictured in The Cincinnatian 1912, Cincinnati yearbook

Biographical details
- Born: August 11, 1886; Hamilton, Ohio, U.S.
- Died: November 15, 1967 (aged 81); San Diego, California, U.S.

Playing career
- 1906–1908: Yale

Coaching career (HC unless noted)
- 1909–1911: Cincinnati

Head coaching record
- Overall: 16–8–2

Accomplishments and honors

Championships
- National (1907)

Robert Boyd Burch (August 11, 1886 – November 15, 1967) was an American football player and coach and judge. He served as the head coach at the University of Cincinnati from 1909 to 1911, compiling a record of 16–8–2. Burch played college football at Yale University and was captain of the 1908 Yale Bulldogs football team. Burch moved to San Diego, California in 1927. He was appointed in 1939 to the bench of the Superior Court of San Diego, serving until his retirement in 1960. Burch died on November 15, 1967, in San Diego.

== Head coaching record ==
Year	Team	Overall	Conference	Standing	Bowl/playoffs
Cincinnati (Independent) (1909)
1909	Cincinnati	4–3–1			
Cincinnati (Ohio Athletic Conference) (1910–1911)
1910	Cincinnati	6–3	3–1	T–3rd	
1911	Cincinnati	6–2–1	2–1–1	5th	
Cincinnati:		16–8–2	5–2–1		
Total:		16–8–2			
