= Jack Hegarty =

American football player and sports coach (1888–1974)

Biographical details
- Born: June 9, 1888; Newburyport, Massachusetts, U.S.
- Died: March 1, 1974 (aged 85)

Playing career
- 1910–1912: Georgetown
- Position: End

Coaching career (HC unless noted)

Football
- 1914–1915: North Carolina A&M
- 1921: Washington Senators

Basketball
- 1913–1914: North Carolina A&M

Head coaching record
- Overall: 5–6–2 (college football); 1–2 (NFL); 6–7 (college basketball)

John Edward Hegarty (June 9, 1888 – March 1, 1974) was an American football player and coach of football and basketball.

He served as the head football coach at North Carolina College of Agriculture and Mechanic Arts, now North Carolina State University, from 1914 to 1915, compiling a record of 5–6–2. Hegarty also coached basketball for a season at North Carolina A&M in 1913–14, tallying a mark of 6–7. He was also the head coach of the Washington Senators, who played three games in the National Football League in 1921. Before becoming a coach, Hegarty played college football at Georgetown University from 1910 until 1912.

Hegarty died in 1974 and was buried in Arlington National Cemetery.

== Head coaching record ==
=== College football ===
Year	Team	Overall	Conference	Standing	Bowl/playoffs
North Carolina A&M Aggies (South Atlantic Intercollegiate Athletic Association) (1914–1915)
1914	North Carolina A&M	2–3–1	0–2–1	6th	
1915	North Carolina A&M	3–3–1	0–2	T–8th	
North Carolina A&M:		5–6–2	0–4–1		
Total:		5–6–2			

=== NFL ===
Team	Year	Regular season					Post season			
Team	Year	Won	Lost	Ties	Win %	Finish	Won	Lost	Win %	Result
WAS	1921	1†	2	0	.333	12th in AFPA	–	–	–	–
WAS Total		1	20	0	.333				–	
Total		1	2	0	.333				–	

† - Does not include the forfeit by the Rochester Jeffersons that is not officially recognized by the NFL. Also does not include their 7–4 record in non-APFA games.
