= Youngstown Patricians =

Defunct sports team

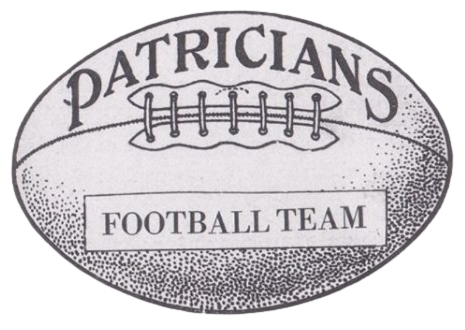
Logo

General information
- Founded: 1911
- Folded: 1919
- Stadium: Wright Field near Idora Park
- Headquartered: Youngstown, Ohio, United States
- Colors: Maroon, gray

Personnel
- Owner: Patrician Club
- General manager: J. P. Omlor
- Head coach: Ray L. Thomas

Nickname
- The Pats

Team history
- Youngstown Patricians (1911–1919)

League / conference affiliations
- Ohio League

Patricians player-coach Ray L. Thomas (1915)

The Youngstown Patricians were a semi-professional football team based in Youngstown, Ohio. In the 1910s, the team briefly held the professional football championship and established itself as a fierce rival of more experienced clubs around the country, some of which later formed the core of the National Football League. The Patricians football team motto was "With Malice to None and a Square Deal to all." According to historian Edward “Otto” Pernotto, the Youngstown Patricians are "the only professional team ever founded in a house of worship."

== Origins ==
The football team was organized in 1911 by the Patrician Club, a men's organization connected to St. Patrick's Roman Catholic parish, on the city's south side. The Patricians were organized to provide recreational enjoyment for the Parish boys and fielded both a basketball team and the more famous football team. The church was founded in 1911 by Father Charles A. Martin who was an earnest supporter of outdoor sports. As sports historian Vic Frolund observes, the Catholic lay organization was designed "to advance the moral, social, and physical welfare of its members." Nevertheless, by 1914, the team associated with the Patricians Club had become a highly competitive enterprise that aggressively recruited some of the top athletic talent in the region. Shortly after the team's founding, its 18 players faced an eight-game schedule among other semi-professional and sandlot teams in Ohio and Pennsylvania. After scoring seven wins and one loss, the Patricians embraced a longer and tougher schedule of nine games.

Faced with more experienced teams like the Canton Bulldogs, the McKeesport Olympics, the Pitcairn Quakers, and the Washington Vigilants, the Patricians increased their squad to 25 men and began to actively recruit well-established players. As Frolund writes: "Contracts were practically unheard of in the early days of the pro game. Consequently, a player could be with a different team every Sunday. His services were open to the highest bidder each week." In this competitive environment, the Patricians managed to secure seasoned players including Ray Miller (Notre Dame), Elgie Tobin (Penn State), Russell "Busty" Ashbaugh (All-American mention at Brown University), and George Vedernack (Carlisle). This power-house team was led by player-coach Ray L. Thomas, a former star athlete at Youngstown's Rayen School.

== Professional championship ==
Led by manager Joseph Omlor and coach Thomas (fresh from the West Virginia University football team), the Patricians entered the 1915 season with a confidence that was soon reflected in the local media. In October, when the "Pats" faced off with a rival club from Barberton, Ohio, one newspaper account assessed, "It is no wonder the Patricians have aimed at the state titular emblem this season. With such a grand organization; one that so admirably combines weight speed, courage, and sheer ability, it is even to their discredit that do not go in quest of the titular honors of several states or the country at large." That season, the Patricians won eight games and tied one. The most unexpected victory was a 13–7 win over the Washington, D.C., Vigilants. As Frolund writes: "Over a span of nine years, the Vigilants had won 90 games, lost but three, and had one tie. The Vigilants had claimed the World's Championship of professional football since 1907, defeating such teams as the famous Philadelphia Blues, Jersey City Pros, Harrisburg Giants, Altoona All-Stars, Maryland and New York City Pros, New York, New Jersey, Boston, Reading, Pennsylvania, and Georgia." As Frolund observes, the victory enabled the Patricians to lay claim to the World's Championship.

In a Youngstown Vindicator article from November 29, 1915, the manager of the Vigilants Joe Oliveri said, "The Patricians defeated us fairly and squarely and we held the eastern title clearly beyond dispute. Youngstown has a remarkable gridiron machine and one that could go down through the east and make trouble for any eleven they met." Also from the article: "He declared football is no better supported in any city in the United States while in very few places are the fans as manifestly fair as they are right here in our own burg." The following season, however, the Patricians faced predictably tough competition as other semi-professional teams sought to challenge their unofficial but widely acknowledged championship. While the Patricians won a slim victory over the Washington Vigilants, they closed the season with a crippling 0–13 loss to the Columbus Panhandles. Their season record was a less-than-stellar 7–4.

== Peak and decline ==
The Patricians entered the 1917 season determined to win back the championship title and assembled a powerhouse team that appeared equal to the task. The team featured five All-Americans. Standouts included Stan Cofall (University of Notre Dame), Tom Gormley (Georgetown University), Franklin "Bart" MacComber (Illinois), Gil Ward (Notre Dame), Jim Barron (Georgetown), and Freeman Fitzgerald (Notre Dame). Ernest "Tommy" Hughitt, who later earned fame playing for a team in Buffalo, played quarterback for Youngstown.

The opening contest of the 1917 season was against Jim Thorpe and his Canton Bulldogs. The game, which took place at Canton's Wright Field, drew a crowd of 7,000 fans. As Frolund notes, player-manager Thorpe, "who very seldom played a full game, played every minute of this one." He adds that the Bulldogs won a narrow victory in a contest where "the lineups read like a who's-who of post-graduate football, circa 1917." As sports historian Keith McClellan writes: "Although the Canton Bulldogs gained 168 yards with their rushing attack and passed for an additional 82 yards, they could not cross Youngstown's goal for a touchdown. The Youngstown defense was outstanding whenever Canton threatened to score. Howard 'Cub' Buck's drop kick from the 15-yard line in the first period produced the only points of the game. Three times, Bart Macomber tried to tie the score with a field goal but failed each attempt. Canton won 3–0." McClellan adds that the game was characterized by "head-to-head competition" between the teams' two centers, Robert Peck (Youngstown) and Ralph "Fats" Waldsmith. According to McClellan, legendary Notre Dame coach Knute Rockne listed Peck "as the best center for the first quarter of this century."

In the wake of this narrow defeat, the Patricians secured a victory over the Massillon Tigers, with a score of 14–6. In another contest with the world-champion Bulldogs later that season, however, the Patricians suffered a devastating loss of 13–0. Canton achieved this victory without the help of Thorpe, who was sidelined by a leg injury. Worse yet, the Youngstown team lost several of its brightest stars, including Cofall, to the Massillon Tigers. Sports historian McClellan observes that "a season that began with such high hopes ended with an unseasonable snowstorm and a modest 4–3 record." Meanwhile, the wave of recruitment that came with America's entry into World War I, along with a flu pandemic that led to restrictions on travel and large gatherings, temporarily slashed the ranks of the nation's professional and semi-professional teams. On June 24, 1922, the Youngstown Patricians were granted an NFL franchise in the new league but were unable to raise the funds and never fielded a team.

== Legacy ==
The Patricians' effort to regroup under coach-manager Thomas unraveled in the wake of a 27–0 defeat at the hands of the Massillon Tigers on October 5, 1919. Yet, Patrician alumnus Russell "Busty" Ashbaugh (football coach of Youngstown's South High School and father of Notre Dame standout Russell "Pete" Ashbaugh) headed up a semi-professional team in Youngstown that fared well in regional contests. As Frolund notes, a team that was to be managed by another Patricians alumnus, Elgie Tobin, received a National Football League franchise, which had a schedule laid out for the 1922 NFL season. The project collapsed without explanation, and the team never played. The Patricians—at least during its peak years—was the closest that Youngstown would come to producing a nationally competitive professional football team. However, the area saw a brief revival of semi-professional football in the 1970s (just before the city's industrial decline) with the organization of the Youngstown Hardhats and in the 2000s with the fully professional Mahoning Valley Thunder of the AF2.

Over the years, the Pro Football Hall of Fame in nearby Canton, Ohio (about an hour southwest of Youngstown) has displayed exhibits honoring the Youngstown Patricians, including highlighting their championship 1915 team as well as one titled "A Parish Turns Pro."

Hughitt went on to the Buffalo professional football club, where he played from 1918 to 1924. During his time in Buffalo he won two state titles, and nearly won two NFL titles (1920 and 1921) as the team's coach and quarterback. Much of the rest of the team ended up with the brand-new Cleveland Panthers in 1919; thanks in large part to their connections to Hughitt, the Panthers played primarily New York-based teams.

Considering Youngstown is located halfway between Cleveland and Pittsburgh, it has fans of the Cleveland Browns and the Pittsburgh Steelers, making it fertile battleground territory for the rivalry the two teams have had since the Browns joined the NFL in 1950 from the All-America Football Conference. Youngstown is also within the 75-mile blackout radius of both cities, though neither team typically has a home game blacked out due to dedicated fanbases for both teams. The most recent blackout from either team was the Browns having their last two home games blacked out at the end of the 1995 season, a direct result of the Cleveland Browns relocation controversy. The Steelers haven't had any home games blacked out since the current blackout rules were applied in 1973.

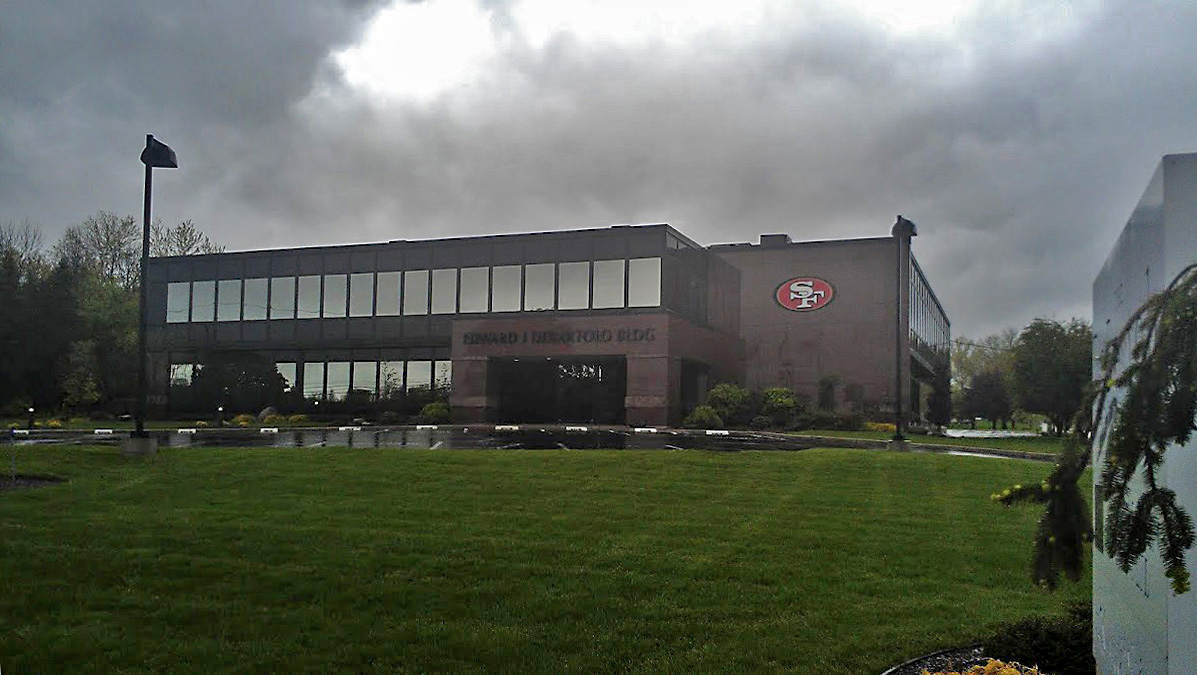
The headquarters of The DeBartolo Corporation in Boardman, Ohio with the San Francisco 49ers logo on the building, signifying the team's ownership by the locally based DeBartolo-York family.

The owners of the San Francisco 49ers, John York and Denise DeBartolo York reside in the Youngstown suburb Canfield, Ohio, and the Pro Football Hall of Fame is located in nearby Canton. In 2011, the 49ers practiced on the campus of Youngstown State University in between road games against the Cincinnati Bengals and Philadelphia Eagles instead of making two East Coast trips in back-to-back weeks; both games resulted in victories for the 49ers.

According to a local news article in 2011, Saint Patrick Church has remained an important part of its community as an "an anchor in a neighborhood of change."

On November 5, 2015, at M Gallery, Erie Terminal Place in downtown Youngstown, a group of enthusiasts, local leaders, media, and the curious, gathered for a celebration to honor the 1915 Youngstown Patricians and an unveiling of a painting by local artist Ray Simon. Accompanied by current Pastor of Saint Patrick, Father Ed Noga, together, Simon and Father Noga revealed "Gridiron Greatness", a painting honoring the team. The painting features the Youngstown area, Saint Patrick Church, and Father Charles A. Martin, original pastor and founder of the football team. The event received press coverage by the Youngstown Vindicator, Cleveland Plain Dealer, the Catholic Exponent, and local TV stations. Many family members of both the 1914 and 1915 teams were in attendance. Mayor John A. McNally, Mahoning County Commissioner Carol Rimedio-Righetti, and Mahoning County Historical Society Executive William Lawson were also present. Items celebrating the team were available for sale including posters of the painting and t-shirts.

Achievements
| Preceded by Akron Indians; 1914 | Ohio League Co-Champions; Youngstown Patricians; Massillon Tigers & Canton Bulldogs; 1915 | Succeeded by Canton Bulldogs; 1916 |
