= Joe Fogg =

American football player and coach (1882–1946)

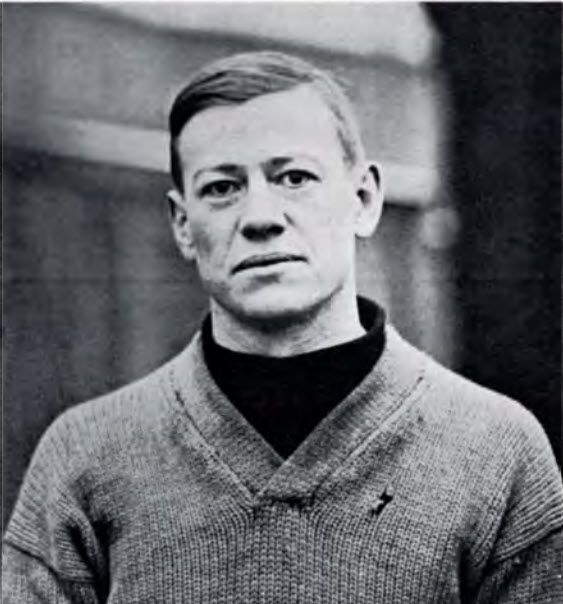
- Coach Joe Fogg during the 1909 season

Biographical details
- Born: July 6, 1882; Mount Vernon, Iowa, U.S.
- Died: December 2, 1946 (aged 64); Shaker Heights, Ohio, U.S.

Playing career
- 1901–1903: Wisconsin
- 1904: Akron East Ends
- Position: Quarterback

Coaching career (HC unless noted)
- 1904–1906: East HS (OH)
- 1907–1910: Case

Head coaching record
- Overall: 26–8–4 (ccllege)

Accomplishments and honors

Awards
- Case Western Reserve Varsity Hall of Fame (1986)

Joseph Graham Fogg (July 6, 1882 – December 2, 1946) was an American football player for the Wisconsin Badgers and the Akron East Ends. Born in Mount Vernon, Iowa, he was also the founder and president of the Cleveland Touchdown Club as well as prominent attorney in Cleveland, Ohio. From 1909 until his death in 1946, he was a law partner at Calfee & Fogg, today known as Calfee, Halter & Griswold LLP.

During the beginning of his law career, he practiced part-time and coached the East High School football team. From 1907 to 1910, he was the head football coach at Case School of Applied Science—now known as Case Western Reserve University. He was later inducted into the school's varsity hall of fame on April 4, 1986.

From 1898 to 1899, Fogg served with the 49th Iowa Volunteer Infantry, Company "A" during the Spanish–American War.

Fogg was a part-owner of the Cleveland Rams of the National Football League (NFL).

== Playing career ==
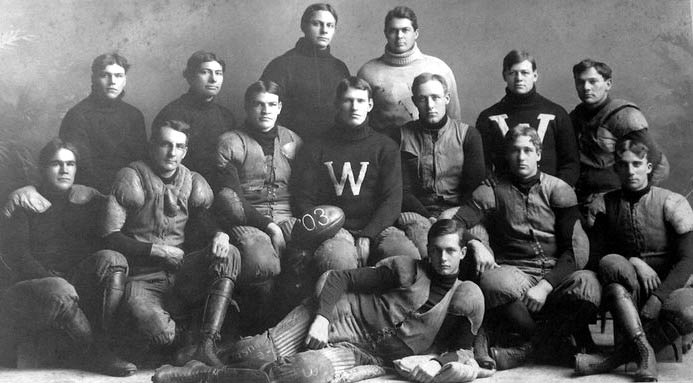
Joe Fogg as quarterback of the 1903 Wisconsin Badgers, located second from the right from top main row, wearing his varsity "W" letter.

=== Collegiate career ===
Fogg played quarterback for the Wisconsin Badgers from 1901 to 1903, starting during the 1902 and 1903 seasons.

=== 1904 Akron–Massillon Ohio League championship ===
For one season, Fogg played professional football as quarterback for the Akron East Ends in 1904.

In a Thanksgiving Day game between the Massillon Tigers and Akron East Ends was scheduled to determine the champion of the "Ohio League", which was the direct predecessor to the modern National Football League. During the game Massillon score the first touchdown of the game (which counted as five points at the time) and made the extra point to make the score 6–0.

In the last moments of the game though, Akron scored a touchdown to make the score 6–5. Fogg, who was Akron's quarterback, had to make the extra point in order for East Ends to get a share of the title.

Under the rules of the time, an extra point came on a free kick straight out from where the touchdown was scored (a rule still in place in both codes of rugby but not in American football, which abolished it upon the creation of hash marks in 1932). This made for a very difficult kick by Fogg since the touchdown was scored on a difficult angle from the goal posts and he had to deal with a crosswind blowing. Fogg missed the extra point as Massillon won the title.

== Coaching career ==
Fogg began coaching football at East High School in Cleveland.

While at Case Tech, Fogg continued the program success created by his predecessor, Joseph Wentworth, who had won the first four football titles of the Ohio Athletic Conference (OAC). From 1907 to 1910, Fogg coached for a combined winning of 26–8–4 (.737).

Against the Ohio State Buckeyes, Fogg earned a perfect 4–0 record, where the Ohio State Championship Award was retired to the Case trophy case. Against rival Western Reserve, Fogg struggled against the teams coached by William B. Seaman, going 0–2–1. After Seaman's death, Fogg finally defeated Western Reserve, coached by Xen C. Scott, in 1910.

== Legacy ==
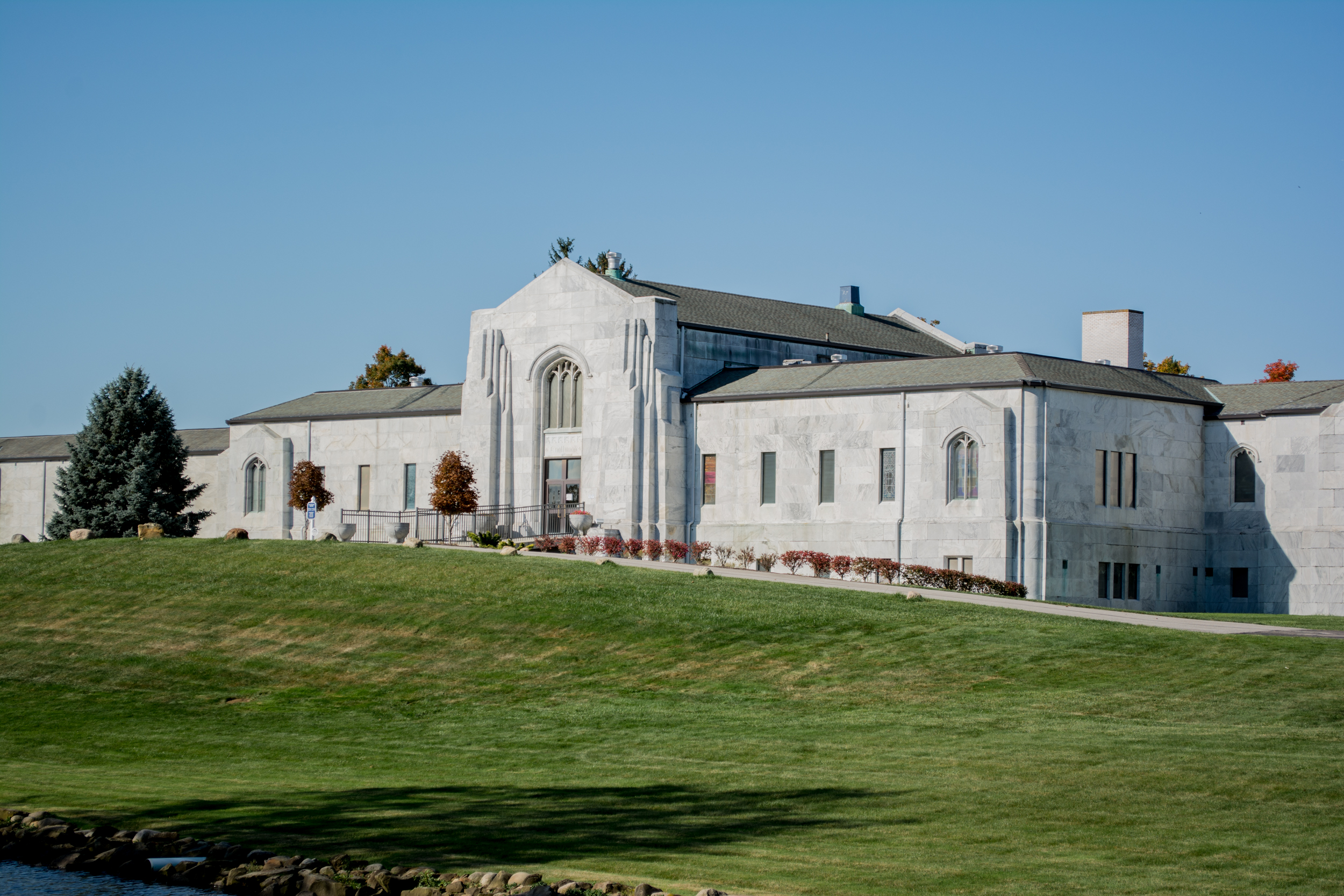
Knollwood Cemetery mausoleum.

In 1909, Fogg partnered with Robert M. Calfee, renaming the firm Calfee & Fogg. He remained a longtime partner and leader at the firm until his death on December 2, 1946, from a cerebral hemorrhage. Today, the Cleveland-based law firm is known as Calfee, Halter & Griswold LLP.

Fogg founded and served as the first president of the Cleveland Touchdown Club from 1938 to 1942. In his honor every year, the Cleveland Touchdown Club's Joe Fogg Memorial Award is presented to the national collegiate player of the year in the Midwest. His son, Joe G. Fogg, Jr., was a 1941 graduate from Princeton University and served in the American Field Service during World War II. His unit, on active duty through Sicily, Italy, France, and Germany, ultimately evacuated the Bergen-Belsen concentration camp. He died on April 2, 1992.

Fogg is buried alongside his wife Mary at Knollwood Cemetery in Mayfield Heights, Ohio, inside the main mausoleum.

== Head coaching record ==
=== College ===
Year	Team	Overall	Conference	Standing	Bowl/playoffs
Case (Ohio Athletic Conference) (1907–1910)
1907	Case	8–3	5–2		
1908	Case	6–3–1	4–2–1		
1909	Case	6–1–2	5–0–2		
1910	Case	6–1–1	5–1		
Case:		26–8–4	19–5–3		
Total:		26–8–4			
