= 1910 Ohio State Buckeyes football team =

American college football season

1910 Ohio State Buckeyes football
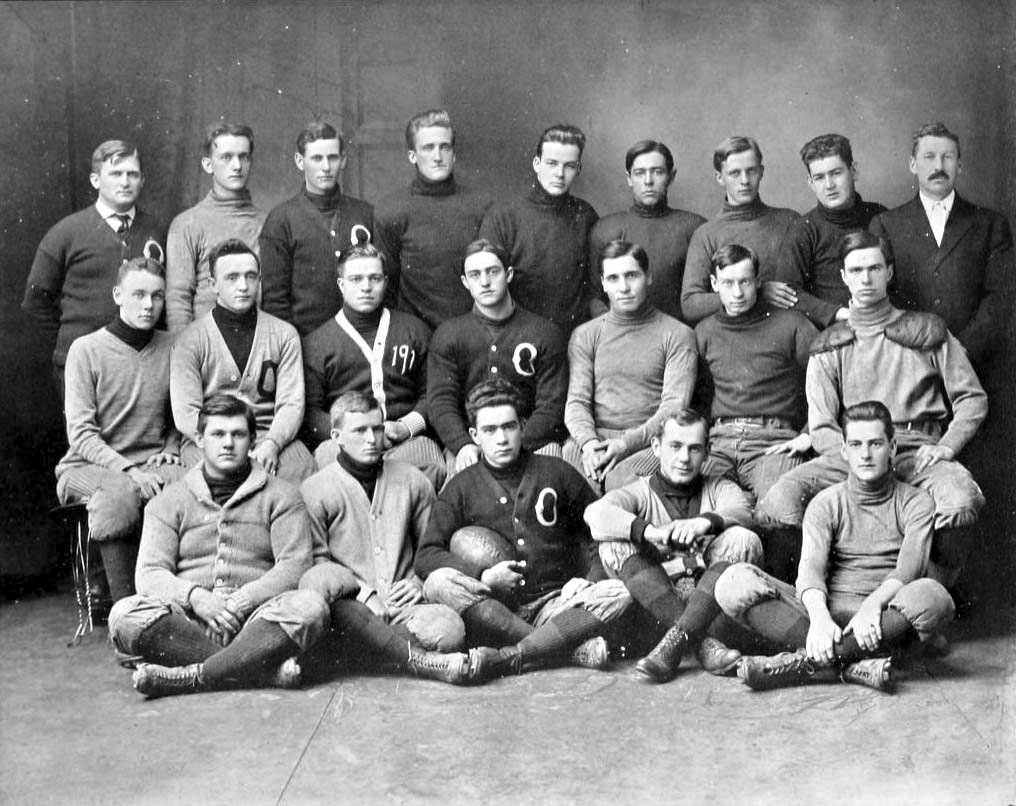
- Conference: Ohio Athletic Conference
- Record: 6–1–3 (5–1–2 OAC)
- Head coach: Howard Jones (1st season)
- Home stadium: Ohio Field

1910 Ohio Athletic Conference football standings
	Conf.					Overall
Team	W		L		T	W		L		T
Oberlin $	3	–	0	–	1	5	–	1	–	2
Case	5	–	1	–	0	6	–	1	–	1
Ohio State	5	–	1	–	2	5	–	1	–	3
Cincinnati	3	–	1	–	0	5	–	3	–	0
Western Reserve	4	–	3	–	0	5	–	4	–	0
Ohio Wesleyan	3	–	3	–	0	6	–	3	–	0
Miami (OH)	1	–	1	–	0	2	–	4	–	1
Denison	3	–	4	–	2	3	–	4	–	2
Wooster	1	–	4	–	1	1	–	6	–	1
Kenyon	1	–	5	–	0	1	–	6	–	1
Wittenberg	0	–	5	–	0	2	–	7	–	0
Ohio	0	–	1	–	0	0	–	6	–	1
$ – Conference champion

The 1910 Ohio State Buckeyes football team was an American football team that represented Ohio State University during the 1910 college football season. In their first season under head coach Howard Jones, the Buckeyes compiled a 6–1–3 record and outscored their opponents by a combined total of 182 to 27.

== Schedule ==
Date	Opponent	Site	Result	Source
September 24	Otterbein*	Ohio Field; Columbus, OH	W 14–5	
October 1	Wittenberg	Ohio Field; Columbus, OH	W 62–0	
October 8	Cincinnati	Ohio Field; Columbus, OH	W 23–0	
October 15	Western Reserve	Ohio Field; Columbus, OH	W 6–0	
October 22	Michigan*	Ohio Field; Columbus, OH (rivalry)	T 3–3	
October 29	Denison	Ohio Field; Columbus, OH	T 5–5	
November 5	at Case	Van Horn Field; Cleveland, OH	L 10–14	
November 12	Ohio Wesleyan	Ohio Field; Columbus, OH	W 6–0	
November 19	Oberlin	Ohio Field; Columbus, OH	T 0–0	
November 24	Kenyon	Ohio Field; Columbus, OH	W 53–0	
*Non-conference game
