= Jack Goodrich =

American football player and manager

Profile
- Position: Halfback

Career history

Playing
- 1903: Massillon Tigers

Operations
- 1903: Massillon Tigers (manager)

Awards and highlights
- 1903 Ohio League Champs

Jack Goodrich was an attorney from Massillon, Ohio, who became the first manager of the Massillon Tigers of the Ohio League. Outside of his managerial duties, Goodrich also played halfback for the team in 1903.
