= F. J. Griffiths =

English-born American businessman (1878–1951)

Frederick J. Griffiths (December 11, 1878 – October 17, 1951) was an English-born American businessman. He is worked with Henry Ford to develop a vanadium alloy steel in order to produce lighter-weight, stronger automobiles. When the Massillon Rolling Mill Company merged into the Central Steel Company in June 1914, Griffiths resigned as a chemist at Canton's United Steel Company to become Central's vice president and superintendent. He then became the president of the company. His daughter, Gertrude, lit the first open hearth furnace at the new Central Steel Company in 1915. In 1917, Griffith's was named to the Massillon Steel Casting Company board of directors. The company's earliest orders came from the United States Armed Forces for production of the steel-rated equipment and supplies needed for World War I. By 1919, 3 of his 5 brothers were all superintendents at Central Steel.

In 1920, Griffiths was anticipated by many in Massillon, Ohio to purchase the Massillon Tigers, of the Ohio League and take the team into the new National Football League. However he never attended a meeting regarding the league or club and the Tigers soon folded.

When Central Steel became part of Central Alloy Steel Company, Griffiths became chairman of its board of trustees. However, when that firm was absorbed by the Republic Steel Corporation, he was assigned the presidency of the Republic Research Corporation. Not wanting to conduct research, Griffth's left Republic to join the Timken Company.
