= Washington Senators (APFA) =

Defunct American football club

General information
- Founded: 1921
- Folded: 1941; 85 years ago
- Stadium: American League Park
- Headquartered: Washington, D.C., United States
- Colors: Blue, white

Personnel
- Owner: Washington Professional Football Club
- General manager: Tim Jordan
- Head coach: Jack Hegarty

Nicknames
- "Washington Pros" "Washington Presidents"

Team history
- Washington Senators (1921); Washington Football Club (1922)

League / conference affiliations
- American Professional Football Association (1921); Independent (1922)

The Washington Senators, also referred to as the Washington Pros or Washington Presidents, was a professional football club from Washington, D.C. The team played for one season in the American Professional Football Association (now the National Football League) during the 1921 season. Afterward, it continued to operate as an independent football club until 1941. The Senators played and practiced at American League Park.

== Formation ==
Washington, D.C. was a considerable distance from most professional football activity in the 1910s and 1920s, with the closest circuit of professional teams of note located in Philadelphia, Pennsylvania. At least one pre-NFL team from the city, the Washington Vigilants, was considered at or near par to the top teams in the country, consistently beating its local peers and playing a close loss to the Youngstown Patricians, an undefeated team in the Ohio League, then considered the premier U.S. pro circuit, in 1915. The Vigilants disbanded in 1916.

The Senators were formed specifically for the 1921 APFA season. Officials from the Washington Professional Football Club met at the Arlington Hotel on May 19, 1921, to finalize plans for the team, then referred to as the Washington Pros. Tim Jordan was appointed the team's business manager, and the squad was coached by former Georgetown star Jack Hegarty. The Senators would play a full 11-game schedule, however only four of those games would be against other APFA squads. The team featured Benny Boynton who would be involved in all three Senator touchdowns that were scored in APFA contests, throwing for two and running in the third.

== 1921 season ==
=== First non-league opponents ===
The Senators began their 1921 campaign with a 33–0 win over the Wilmington Collegians. Led by quarterback Bullets Watson, the victory featured touchdowns by Jack Sullivan, Watson and Dutch Leighty. The team's next opponent was the Holmesburg Athletic Club which was based out of Holmesburg, Pennsylvania, and were made up of former college stars from Penn State, Penn, Cornell, Swarthmore College, Carlisle Indian School and Lafayette College. The Senators' third game was against a team from Norfolk, after a semi-pro team from Akron was unable to play due to having a large number of injured players.

=== Syracuse Pros ===
After playing against three non-APFA opponents, the Senators defeated the Syracuse Pros 20–7 at home. It is unclear however if the Pros were ever a part of the APFA. The team acknowledged that they were members of the league, however there is no record available through the APFA or NFL documenting the team's membership. Therefore, the Pros are not counted in many record books as being an APFA or NFL franchise.

=== Harry Courtney ===
Harry Courtney, a left-handed pitcher for the Washington Senators baseball club, signed with the football Senators for their November 20 game against a team from Clarksburg, West Virginia. However Clark Griffith, the owner of the baseball Senators, found out about his Courtney moonlighting as a football player. Griffith ordered Courtney to stop playing football or risk finding himself without a job in baseball. Indeed, Courtney gave up his football career and continued to focus only on baseball.

=== APFA debut ===
The Senators' APFA debut occurred on November 27, 1921, when they faced the Canton Bulldogs. Canton had a reputation was one of the nation's premier clubs. The game received relatively large amounts of exposure in the local papers. Many observers saw this as Washington's big chance to show that it was a force to be taken seriously nationally. While, Canton was known for its speed, Washington came into the game with a weight advantage. Washington's average offensive lineman tipped the scales at 189 pounds while Canton's stood at 185 pounds, while the backs registered at 171 pounds to the Bulldogs' 168 pounds. To help his team win the game, Senators head coach Jack Hegerty signed three former Canton players in an effort to tip the odds. Former Georgia Tech star Joe Guyon, Johnny Gilroy and Pete Calac. The plan was to have the men come off the bench and provide support to the already sturdy starting eleven.

With tickets priced one dollar, approximately 4,000 showed up to American League Field to see the game. However Canton shutout Washington, 15–0.

=== Rochester forfeit controversy ===
Washington was originally scheduled to play the Pittsburgh Collegians after their loss to Canton, however the plans for the game fell apart. When that happened, Tim Jordan substituted the Collegians for the Rochester Jeffersons.

On December 5, 1921, a game was scheduled between the Jeffersons and the Senators. Due to the field being covered with snow, Rochester's manager Leo Lyons refused to play the game rather than risk injury to his players. It has been said by some fans and historians that Lyons forfeited the game because of snowy conditions. However, according to Lyons, the Senators had a poor fan turnout due to a snowstorm and said they would only pay the Jefferson team roughly $200. That amount would not allow for the team to be paid to play the game, or travel expenses for the trip back to Rochester. The game had an NFL guarantee that the Jeffersons must be paid $800 for the game regardless of anything. Lyons refused to play the game because of Washington not paying the $800 that was in the game contract.

The contract between the two teams stated that if there was a dispute as to the condition of the field, the decision would belong to the home team. Washington was willing to play the game, not wanting to disappoint the 400 or so fans who had shown up. After forty minutes of arguing, the game was awarded to Washington, by the score of 1–0. Later, NFL commissioner Joseph Carr ruled in favor of Lyons and the Jeffs.

Meanwhile, the Senators were required to pay an $800 guaranteed fee to the Jeffersons for showing up regardless of whether the contest happened or not. Washington never paid, as it decided to immediately leave the APFA after the season anyway. As a result of the fine remaining unpaid, the NFL did record the game as a victory, however the Elias Sports Bureau has not recognized this game as a forfeit and official NFL standings also say it was not a forfeit.

=== First win and rematch with Canton ===
The Senators recorded their first APFA victory on December 11 against the Cleveland Indians, 7–0, before a reported 5,000 spectators.

On December 18, 1921, Tim Jordan landed a rematch with the Canton Bulldogs, and was determined to put up a better fight. Washington reached an agreement with Penn State All-American quarterback Glenn Killinger to play for the Senators, hoping that one of the premier collegiate players would be enough to tip the scales. However at the last moment, Killinger not only pulled out of his deal with the Senators, but also signed with the Bulldogs.

Washington found themselves in an early 14–0 deficit, after a long Killinger pass caught the Senators by surprise, and a poor Boynton punt gave Canton an easy chance to push in their second touchdown. However Washington evened the score at 14 after two long drives that ended with a Johnnie Hudson touchdown reception and a Boynton touchdown run. The game remained tied late into the game, with the Senators holding possession with just a few minutes left in the game. But Washington's Gene Vidal fumbled the ball, and Canton was able to march down the field to take the lead. After the kickoff, the Bulldogs intercepted a Washington pass and returned it for the final touchdown.

Before around 6,000 fans, the Senators again fell to the Bulldogs 28–14.

However, the Senators would play one more game, while still members of the AFPA. On December 26, 1921, the Senators were scheduled to play a team of All-Stars at American League Park. The results of the game are unknown. The Senators finished the game with a 1–2–0 AFPA record.

APFA Record & Standings
Year	W	L	T	Pct.	PTS-OPP	PPG-OPP	Finish	Coach
1921	1†	2	0	.333	21- 53	7.0–17.7	12th	Jack Hegarty

† – Does not include the forfeit by the Rochester Jeffersons that is not officially recognized by the NFL

== 1922 ==
The Senators would leave the AFPA following the 1921 season. Only three of the Senators (Benny Boynton, Pete Calac and Joe Guyon) would play in the NFL following the 1921 season.

Led by Bullets Watson on the field and Tim Jordan off (who appears to have doubled as coach), the club did continue to function in the 1922 season as the Washington Football Club or the Washington Pros.

=== Games ===
- Home Opener: Akron Indians 6, Pros 0
- November 5; Pros at Baltimore

If this game was in fact played, Washington came out with a victory or tie.

- November 12; Toledo Maroons 16, Pros 0 at American League Park

The game featured the return of Bennie Boynton, who left the Pros to play with Toledo. For this game, Boynton switched sides and played with the Pros. Akron recorded two touchdowns and safety to remain unbeaten. The Pros relied heavily on Boynton, but could no recover from an early blocked drop-kick, which was run back for the first Arkon score.

- November 19; Pros vs. Rochester at American League Park
- November 26; no game
- Pros vs. Chester Shipbuilding (replacement for Pennsylvania Quakers)
- Pros vs. Canton Bulldogs

The game against Canton came after nearly a month-long layoff, they hosted the APFA champion, and their old nemesis, the Canton Bulldogs. Canton was determined to keep their unbeaten record unblemished, and started their regular unit against the Washingtonians.
