= 1910 Case football team =

American college football season

1910 Case football
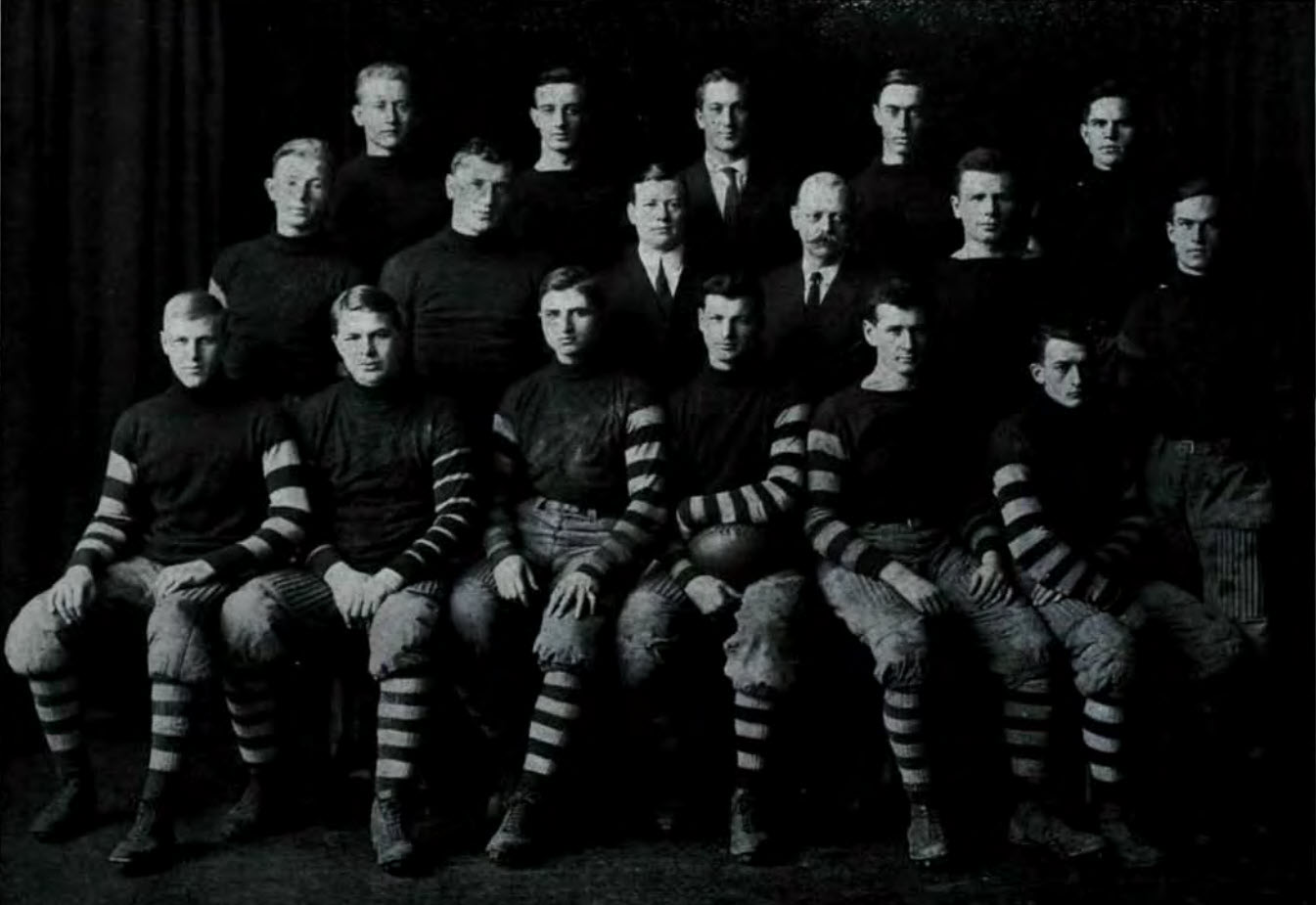
- Conference: Ohio Athletic Conference
- Record: 6–1–1 (5–1 OAC)
- Head coach: Joe Fogg (4th season)

1910 Ohio Athletic Conference football standings
	Conf.					Overall
Team	W		L		T	W		L		T
Oberlin $	3	–	0	–	1	5	–	1	–	2
Case	5	–	1	–	0	6	–	1	–	1
Ohio State	5	–	1	–	2	5	–	1	–	3
Cincinnati	3	–	1	–	0	5	–	3	–	0
Western Reserve	4	–	3	–	0	5	–	4	–	0
Ohio Wesleyan	3	–	3	–	0	6	–	3	–	0
Miami (OH)	1	–	1	–	0	2	–	4	–	1
Denison	3	–	4	–	2	3	–	4	–	2
Wooster	1	–	4	–	1	1	–	6	–	1
Kenyon	1	–	5	–	0	1	–	6	–	1
Wittenberg	0	–	5	–	0	2	–	7	–	0
Ohio	0	–	1	–	0	0	–	6	–	1
$ – Conference champion

The 1910 Case football team represented the Case School of Applied Science, now a part of Case Western Reserve University, during the 1910 college football season. The team's head coach was Joe Fogg.

Case handed Ohio State their only loss of the season and extended a four-game win streak against the Buckeyes, making Fogg a perfect 4–0 against Ohio State during his coaching tenure.

The team outscored opponents by a combined 82-22.

== Schedule ==
Date	Opponent	Site	Result	Attendance
October 8	at Michigan*	Ferry Field; Ann Arbor, MI	T 3–3	3,500
October 15	Denison	Van Horn Field; Cleveland, OH	W 15–3	
October 22	at Wooster	Wooster, OH	W 15–0	
October 29	Oberlin	Van Horn Field; Cleveland, OH	L 0–6	
November 5	Ohio State	Van Horn Field; Cleveland, OH	W 14–10	
November 12	Kenyon	Van Horn Field; Cleveland, OH	W 20–0	
November 19	at Mount Union*	O & P Baseball Field; Canton, OH	W 12–0	
November 24	Western Reserve	Van Horn Field; Cleveland, OH	W 3–0	7,080
*Non-conference game

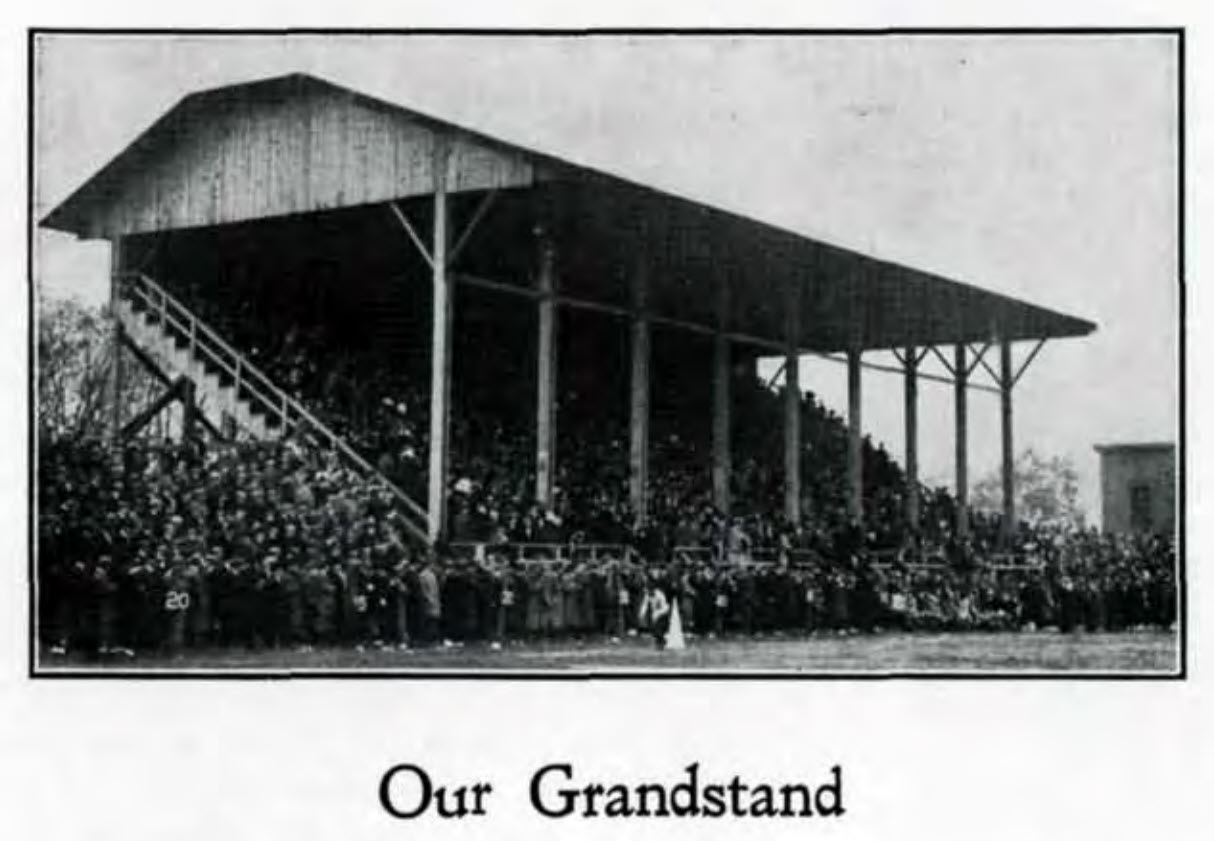
For the 1910 season, the Grandstand was added on the west side of Van Horn Field adding an additional 1,800 seats
