= 1910 Cincinnati football team =

American college football season

1910 Cincinnati football
- Conference: Ohio Athletic Conference
- Record: 6–3 (3–1 OAC)
- Head coach: Robert Burch (2nd season)
- Captain: Walter Heuck
- Home stadium: Carson Field, League Park

1910 Ohio Athletic Conference football standings
	Conf.					Overall
Team	W		L		T	W		L		T
Oberlin $	3	–	0	–	1	5	–	1	–	2
Case	5	–	1	–	0	6	–	1	–	1
Ohio State	5	–	1	–	2	5	–	1	–	3
Cincinnati	3	–	1	–	0	5	–	3	–	0
Western Reserve	4	–	3	–	0	5	–	4	–	0
Ohio Wesleyan	3	–	3	–	0	6	–	3	–	0
Miami (OH)	1	–	1	–	0	2	–	4	–	1
Denison	3	–	4	–	2	3	–	4	–	2
Wooster	1	–	4	–	1	1	–	6	–	1
Kenyon	1	–	5	–	0	1	–	6	–	1
Wittenberg	0	–	5	–	0	2	–	7	–	0
Ohio	0	–	1	–	0	0	–	6	–	1
$ – Conference champion

The 1910 Cincinnati football team was an American football team that represented the University of Cincinnati as a member of the Ohio Athletic Conference (OAC) during the 1910 college football season. Led by second-year head coach Robert Burch, Cincinnati compiled an overall record of 6–3 with a mark of 3–1 in conference play, tying for third place in the OAC. Walter Heuck was the team captain. The team played home games at Carson Field and League Park in Cincinnati.

== Schedule ==
Date	Time	Opponent	Site	Result	Attendance	Source
October 1		Transylvania*	Carson Field; Cincinnati, OH	W 16–0		
October 8		at Ohio State	Ohio Field; Columbus, OH	L 0–23		
October 15		Earlham*	Carson Field; Cincinnati, OH	W 20–0		
October 22		at Wittenberg	Zimmerman Field; Springfield, OH	W 8–0	500	
October 29	2:30 p.m.	Miami (OH)	League Park; Cincinnati, OH (Victory Bell)	W 3–0		
November 5	2:30 p.m.	Otterbein*	League Park; Cincinnati, OH	L 6–12		
November 12	2:30 p.m.	Central University*	League Park; Cincinnati, OH	L 3–12		
November 19		Antioch*	League Park; Cincinnati, OH	W 38–0		
November 24		Denison	League Park; Cincinnati, OH	W 28–12		
*Non-conference game
