= 1906 Massillon Tigers season =

American football team season

- Head coach: Sherburn Wightman
- Home stadium: Hospital Grounds Stadium

Results
- Record: 10–1
- League place: 1st (Ohio League)

The 1906 Massillon Tigers football season was their fourth season in existence. The team finished with a record of 10-1 and won their fourth Ohio League championship in as many years. However a scandal, revolving around the Tigers championship game against the Canton Bulldogs, tainted the 1906 title and, along with escalating player salaries, reportedly helped ruin professional football in Ohio until the mid-1910s.

== Schedule ==
Game	Date	Opponent	Result
1	September 29, 1906	Pittsburgh Lyceum	W 19–0
2	October 6, 1906	Muskingum College	W 96–0
3	October 13, 1906	at Benwood Athletic Club	W 22–0
4	October 20, 1906	Shelby Athletic Club	W 57–0
5	October 27, 1906	Combined Benwood-Moundsville Team	W 60–0
6	October 29, 1906	at Toledo Athletic Association	W 49–0
7	November 3, 1906	Wilmington Orange	W 77–0
8	November 6, 1906	Pittsburgh Lyceum	W 33–0
9	November 16, 1906	at Canton Bulldogs	L 10–5
10	November 24, 1906	Canton Bulldogs	W 13–6
11	November 29, 1906	at Heston's All-Western Collegiate All-Stars (Chicago, IL)	W 9–4
