= 1903 Massillon Tigers season =

American football team season

- Head coach: E.J. Stewart
- Home stadium: Hospital Grounds Stadium

Results
- Record: 8–1
- League place: 1st (Ohio League)

The 1903 Massillon Tigers football season was their first season in existence. The team finished with a record of 8–1 and won the Ohio League championship. The Tigers began as an amateur team, however after their roster was decimated by injuries, the team paid several professional football players from western Pennsylvania to play for them against the Akron East Ends for the championship game. The Tigers would remain a professional team for the rest of their existence.

== Schedule ==
| Game | Date | Opponent | Result |
|---|---|---|---|
| 1 | September 26, 1903 | at Wooster College | L 6–0 |
| 2 | October 17, 1903 | Mount Union College | W 16–0 |
| 3 | October 24, 1903 | Akron Imperials | W 6–0 |
| 4 | October 31, 1903 | Akron Blues | W 38–0 |
| 5 | November 7, 1903 | Dennison Panhandles | W 34–0 |
| 6 | November 14, 1903 | Canton, Ohio | W 16–0 |
| 7 | November 21, 1903 | All-Clevelands | W 29–0 |
| 8 | November 26, 1903 | Wooster College | W 34–0 |
| 9 | December 5, 1903 | at Akron East Ends | W 12–0 |
