= Busty Ashbaugh =

American football player and coach (1889–1953)

Personal information
- Born: September 12, 1889; Youngstown, Ohio, U.S.
- Died: November 20, 1953 (aged 64); Youngstown, Ohio, U.S.

Career information
- High school: Rayen School
- College: Brown

Career history

Playing
- 1915–1917: Youngstown Patricians

Coaching
- 1914–1938: South High School

Awards and highlights
- Ohio League champion (1915); 2× Third-team All-American (1911, 1912)

Other information
- Military career
- Allegiance: United States
- Branch: U.S. Army
- Service years: 1918–1919
- Conflicts: World War I

Russell G. "Busty" Ashbaugh Sr. (September 12, 1889 – November 20, 1953) was a celebrated American football player at Brown University who went on to coach competitive teams at South High School in Youngstown, Ohio. He played an important role in the formation of several future coaches, including collegiate legends such as Dike Beede and Wes Fesler.

== Playing career ==
Ashbaugh was born in the industrial hub of Youngstown to W. N. and Clara Butler Ashbaugh. His father served as a clerk for the city's Board of Education for 40 years. Ashbaugh gained early recognition as a football standout at Youngstown's Rayen School.

Upon graduation from Rayen, he went on to Brown University, where he won second-team recognition on Walter Camp's All-America squad as team captain. Ashbaugh played for Brown between 1909 and 1914. After graduating from Brown, Ashbaugh returned to his hometown and played professionally for the Youngstown Patricians.

== Coaching career ==
In 1914, Ashbaugh replaced Perle Denman as coach of South High School, and as his obituary notes, "the team started to make gridiron history". During Ashbaugh's tenure, South High teams scored 135 wins while suffering only 36 defeats. His coaching career as interrupted only briefly by World War I, when he served as a gunner in a machine gun unit. He returned to his coaching position in 1919. While dividing his time between coaching and teaching, he also studied law at Youngstown's YMCA night school, and was admitted to the bar in 1922.

Beyond his contributions as a mentor to All-American football players, Ashbaugh trained many coaches who went on to lead winning high school and collegiate teams. As his obituary notes: "The coaching game in the area is filled with his proteges such as 'Dike' Beede, Youngstown College; Ches McPhee, Chaney (High School); Dick Barrett, East High athletics director and for 25 years a coach; Jack Cramb, North (High School); Cyril James, formerly of Ursuline (High School) and Sharon (High School); Howard Hartman, assistant at Colgate (University); Wes Fesler and others".

Ashbaugh retired from coaching in 1938, and was replaced by John McFee.

== Later life ==
Following his retirement from coaching, Ashbaugh retained his position as a math teacher at South High School and remained active as a booster of the Warriors football team. In the Youngstown area, his contributions to coaching were widely recognized, and on May 17, 1953, he was the guest of honor at a testimonial dinner held at Youngstown's Tippecanoe Country Club. His obituary notes: "More than 200 former South High footballers, members and coaches of opposing teams attended. Mr. Ashbaugh was presented with a television set".

On the afternoon of November 20, 1953, Ashbaugh suffered a massive heart attack, "as he was sitting in a chair preparing to follow the afternoon football games on radio and television".

His funeral services were held at the Shriver-Allison South Side Funeral Home. Besides his wife, the former Thelma Ross, whom he married on February 5, 1919, Ashbaugh left behind his son, Russell Jr., of Edwardburg, Michigan; a brother W.B., of Youngstown; and two grandchildren. A daughter, Mrs. Thelma Action, died in 1950. Ashbaugh's obituary described him as "a great athlete, 'Mr. Football' to the Youngstown district and, in his coaching days, one of the nation's outstanding scholastic football tutors".

== Legacy ==
As a coach, Ashbaugh mentored athletes who went on to both collegiate and professional careers, notably Bob Dove, Harvey Brown, and son Russell "Pete" Ashbaugh, who were football standouts at the University of Notre Dame. He also trained celebrated coaches such as Wes Fesler (Ohio State University, Wesleyan University, University of Pittsburgh, and University of Minnesota) and Dwight "Dike" Beede (Youngstown State University).
