= Washington Vigilants =

The Washington Vigilants were an early professional football team based in Washington, DC. During the very early 1900s, they were considered a top team in professional football, dominating a mid-Atlantic region consisting mostly of military teams. The team was coached by Wayne Hart. Between 1907 and 1915, the Vigilants went 90-3-1. In their biggest game, they fell to the Youngstown Patricians by a score of 13-7, the only Ohio League team they would ever play. The Ohio League was the beginning of professional football at the turn of the century, the precursor to what became the NFL in the 1920s. The Vigilants would not survive to see the NFL's formation; in 1921, the league admitted another team from Washington, the Washington Senators, that had been created specifically for the new league.
