= Pittsburgh Lyceum (American football) =

Former American football team

General information
- Founded: c. 1899
- Folded: c. 1910
- Headquartered: Pittsburgh, Pennsylvania
- Colors: Maroon, White

League / conference affiliations
- Western Pennsylvania Circuit

1924 Pittsburgh Lyceum Football Team. Art Rooney is located on the bottom row, far right.

The Pittsburgh Lyceum was an American football team that was based in Pittsburgh, Pennsylvania from about 1899 to 1910.

== History ==
The Lyceum fielded its first football team no later than 1899. The team in subsequent years played against many of the top "Ohio League" teams, the most notable being the Canton Bulldogs and the Massillon Tigers. It was regarded as one of the top professional football teams in Pittsburgh from 1907 until 1909.

Originally comprising amateur players, the Lyceum attracted suspicion of professionalism over the years as it grew stronger. According to The Pittsburgh Post in 1906, the team was still "purely an amateur organization" albeit one that was "in the class of the big professional teams". When trying to arrange a game against the Western University of Pennsylvania that season, the Lyceum was turned down on the basis that they were a professional team, a charge that the Lyceum denied. Football historian Bob Carroll referred to the Lyceum, at least in the seasons of 1907 to 1909, as a pro team.

The Lyceum was the last pro football championship team that Pittsburgh would produce until the 1970s. Many of its victories came against the strongest teams in Pennsylvania, West Virginia, and Ohio; hence, it was given the moniker, the "Tri-State Champions," in 1909.

The team was finally defeated in 1909, an upset by the Dayton Oakwoods in its final game of 1909. The Lyceum then broke up after a disappointing 1910 season.

The multi-sport Lyceum organization that the football team represented continued to exist, however, and a new football team was organized in 1924. One of the players on this team was Art Rooney, who went on to establish the Pittsburgh Steelers and become enshrined in the Pro Football Hall of Fame.

== Main organization ==
The main Pittsburgh Lyceum club, of which the football team was one branch, was founded in November 1897 as a means to provide activities for young men. Its original home was in downtown Pittsburgh in the basement of the old St. Paul Cathedral (at the later site of the Union Trust Building). When St. Paul's closed in 1903, the Lyceum moved into a new clubhouse near the Church of the Epiphany.

The Lyceum was active in football, basketball, baseball, hockey, handball, track and boxing. It was especially known for the champion boxers who trained there, including Harry Greb, Fritzie Zivic and Billy Conn. The club placed an ice hockey team in the Western Pennsylvania Hockey League, the first or one of the first professional hockey leagues. Apart from sports, the club supported a drama society and held lectures, night classes, and various social activities.

The Lyceum building was demolished in 1957 as part of the redevelopment of the Lower Hill District.
