= Russell "Pete" Ashbaugh =

American football player (1921–2009)

Pete Ashbaugh
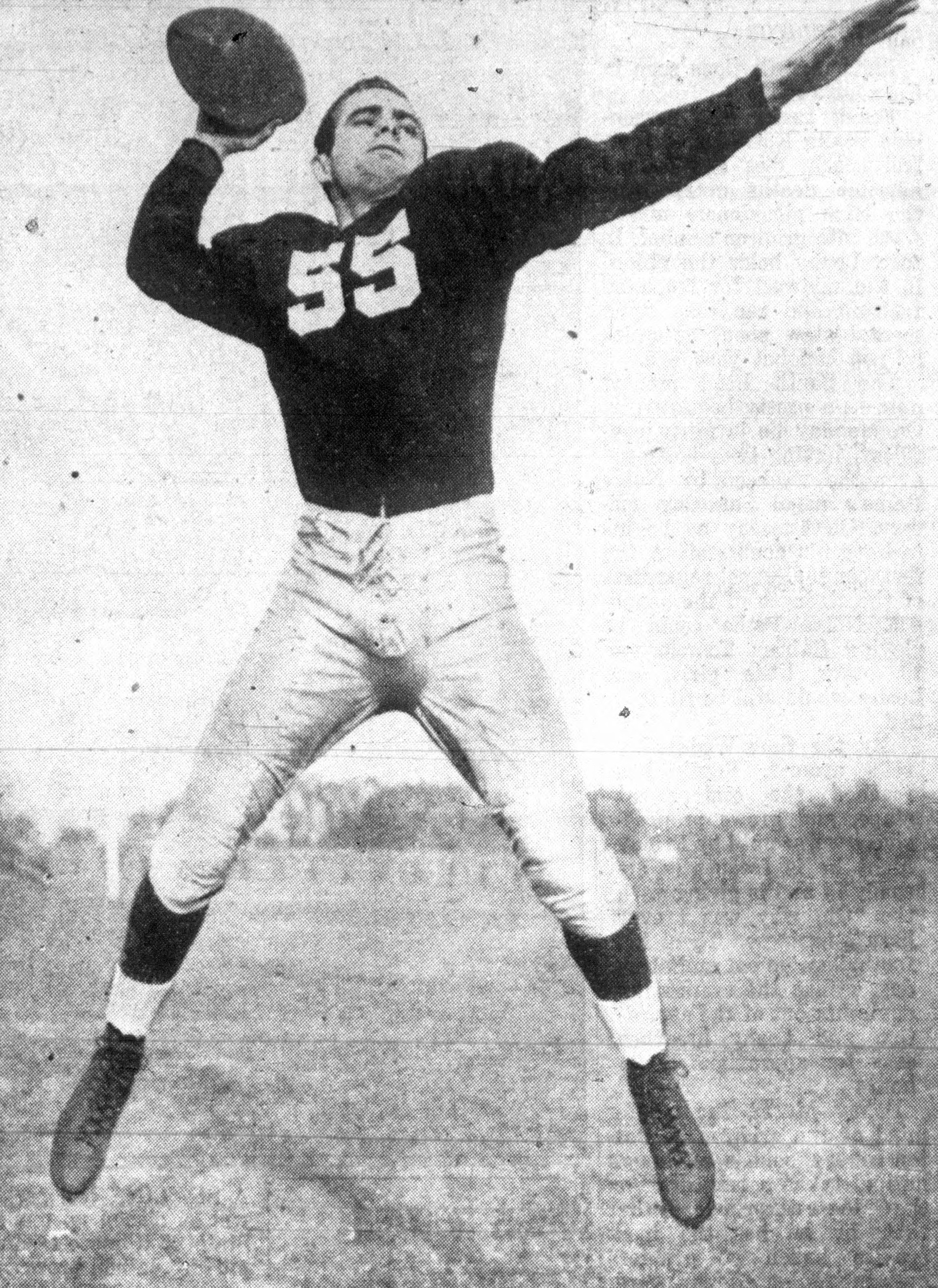
- Ashbaugh, circa 1942

Chicago Rockets
- Position: Quarterback

Personal information
- Born: May 23, 1921; Youngstown, Ohio, U.S.
- Died: August 16, 2009 (aged 88)
- Listed height: 5 ft 9 in (1.75 m)
- Listed weight: 175 lb (79 kg)

Career information
- NFL draft: 1944: 27th round, 283rd overall pick

Career history
- 1946–1947: Notre Dame (football)

Awards and highlights
- Championships: 2× National (1946, 1947)

Russell G. "Pete" Ashbaugh Jr. (May 23, 1921 – August 16, 2009) was an American football standout at the University of Notre Dame who went on to play for the Chicago Rockets in the late 1940s.

Ashbaugh gained early recognition as an All-City Gridder at Youngstown's South High School, in 1938, where he quarterbacked under his father, former Brown University gridder Busty Ashbaugh. He went on to play varsity football at Notre Dame both before and after World War II, distinguishing himself as a member of Fighting Irish national championship teams of 1946 and 1947.

Ashbaugh's subsequent professional career with the Chicago Rockets was cut short by a knee injury. At the close of his sports career, he joined the Elkhart Brass Company, in Elkhart, Indiana, and eventually rose to the position of chief executive officer.
