= Akron East Ends =

Defunct American football team

General information
- Founded: 1894
- Folded: 1904
- Headquartered: Akron, Ohio, United States
- Colors: Unknown
- Website: none

Personnel
- Head coach: Bill Laub

Team history
- Akron East Ends (1894-1903); Akron Athletic Club (1904)

League / conference affiliations
- Ohio League

The Akron East Ends was an amateur American Football team that played in the Ohio League, a forerunner to the National Football League. They played in Akron, Ohio, from 1894 until at least 1904. Its primary rivals were the amateur Canton Athletic Association (which eventually evolved into the professional Canton Bulldogs), the Shelby Blues, and later the Massillon Tigers. The team became known as the Akron Athletic Club around 1904.

== History ==
The East Ends, along with the Akron Imperials and the Akron Blues, were one of the top amateur teams in Akron. According to Professional Football Researchers Association founder Bob Carroll; Akron was, for several years prior to 1903, a top contender for the Ohio Independent Championship (OIC), though this was in the days before the association became a force in the professional game; Akron was also passed over for the World Series of Football when it was first held in 1902.

The East Ends were on the verge of winning the 1903 OIC on a common-opponent tiebreaker over the Shelby Blues. However, the Massillon Tigers began making a run for the title. Akron initially dismissed Massillon, telling them to "go play for a couple of years" before trying to challenge the East Ends. However, Akron was unable to match Massillon's margin of victory over Canton. The East Ends defeated Canton 17-6, while Massillon defeated that same team 16-0. Akron felt compelled to play and beat Massillon and prove itself worthy of the state title. A game was scheduled and East Ends appeared to be in luck when several Massillon starters fell victim to injury. However, the Tigers replaced its injured stars by buying the roster of the Pittsburgh Stars, the champions of the 1902 National Football League. In a game that had the feel of being one step short of a full-out riot, Akron lost to Massillon, 11-0, for the Ohio Independent Championship.

Akron vowed to avenge the loss in 1904, and in turn, began paying at least half of its players. On the 1904 Thanksgiving Day matchup, Akron traveled to Massillon, with about 1500 fans, to face the Tigers. The game was played in front of a total estimated crowd of 7,300 spectators. This was by far the largest attendance to date for a professional football game. Massillon jumped to an early 6-0 lead. Akron, in the last seconds of the game, scored a touchdown and had an opportunity to tie the game. However, Akron's kicker, Joe Fogg, missed the extra point attempt, as Akron lost the Ohio title for the second straight year.

The team seemed to fade from view after the 1904 contest, not wanting to pursue professional football any further. Player-coach Bill Laub moved onto the Canton Bulldogs. By no later than 1908, it had been superseded by the Akron Indians.

Achievements
Preceded by First	Ohio League Champions; Akron East Ends; 1902	Succeeded by Massillon Tigers; 1903 & 1904 & 1905 & 1906
