= List of people from Ohio =

State flag of Ohio

Location of Ohio in the United States

The following is a list of notable people born in the U.S. state of Ohio, and people who spent significant periods of their lives living in Ohio.

== Actors, models, miscellaneous performers ==
A–B

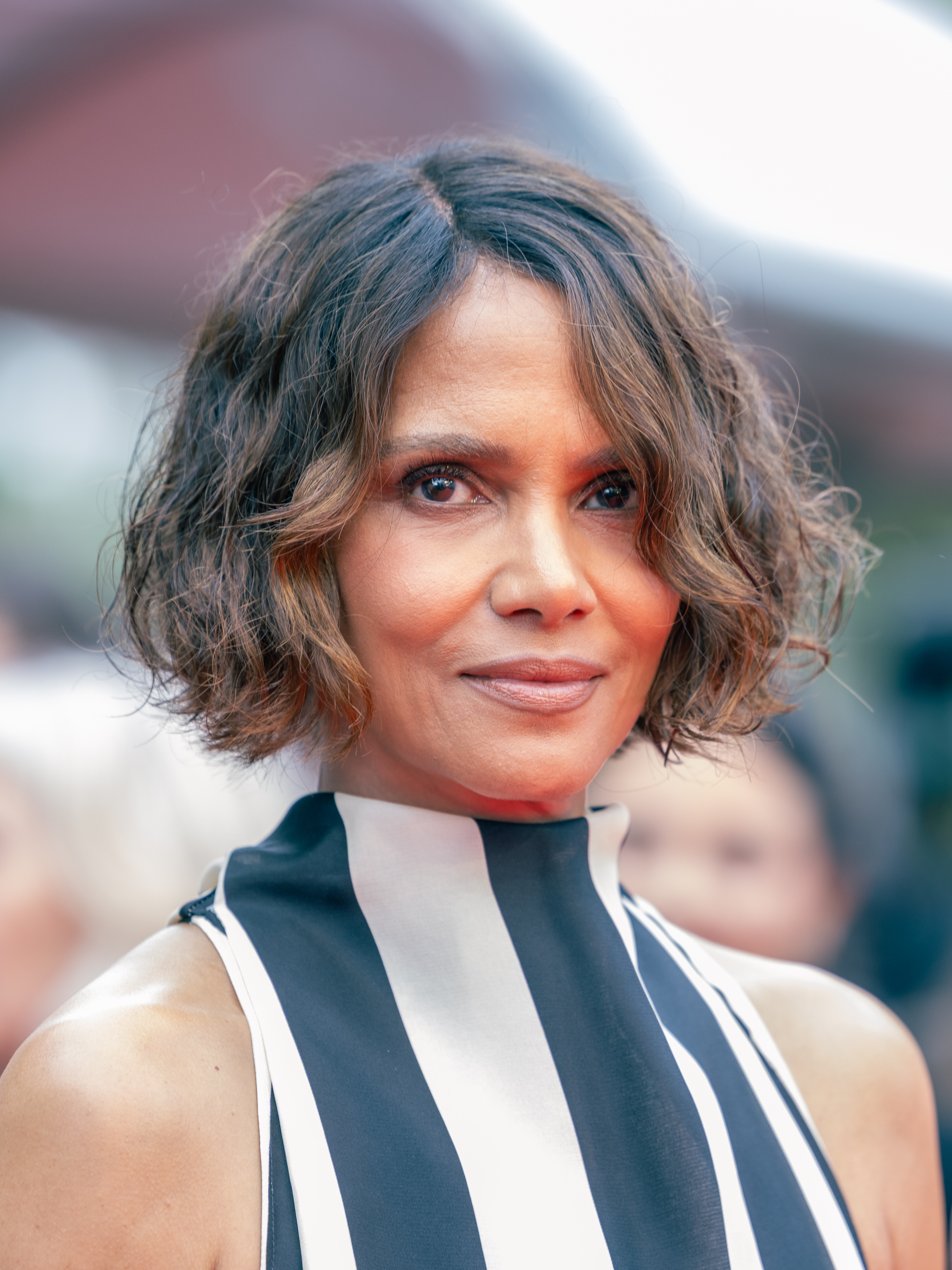
Halle Berry

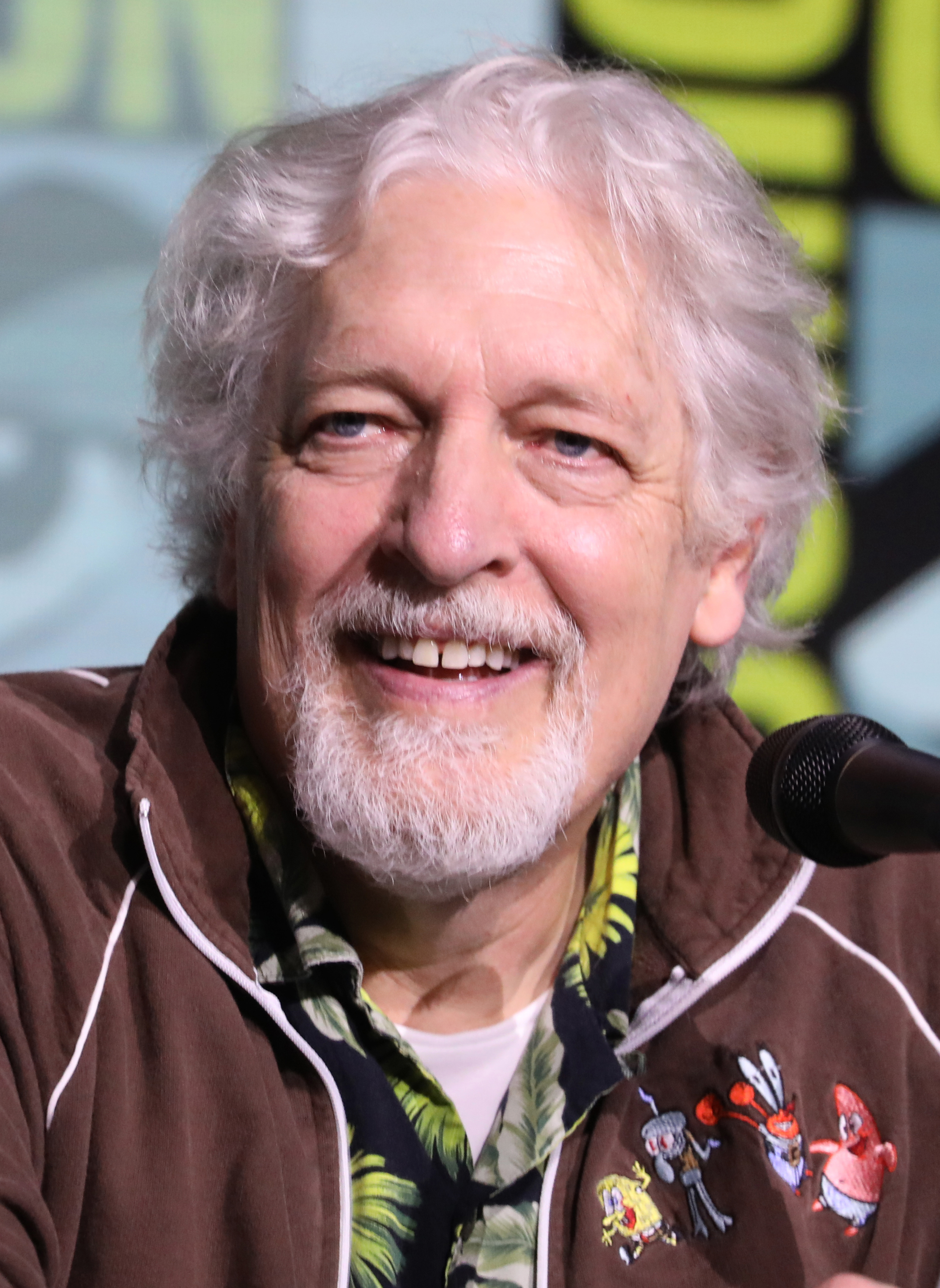
Clancy Brown

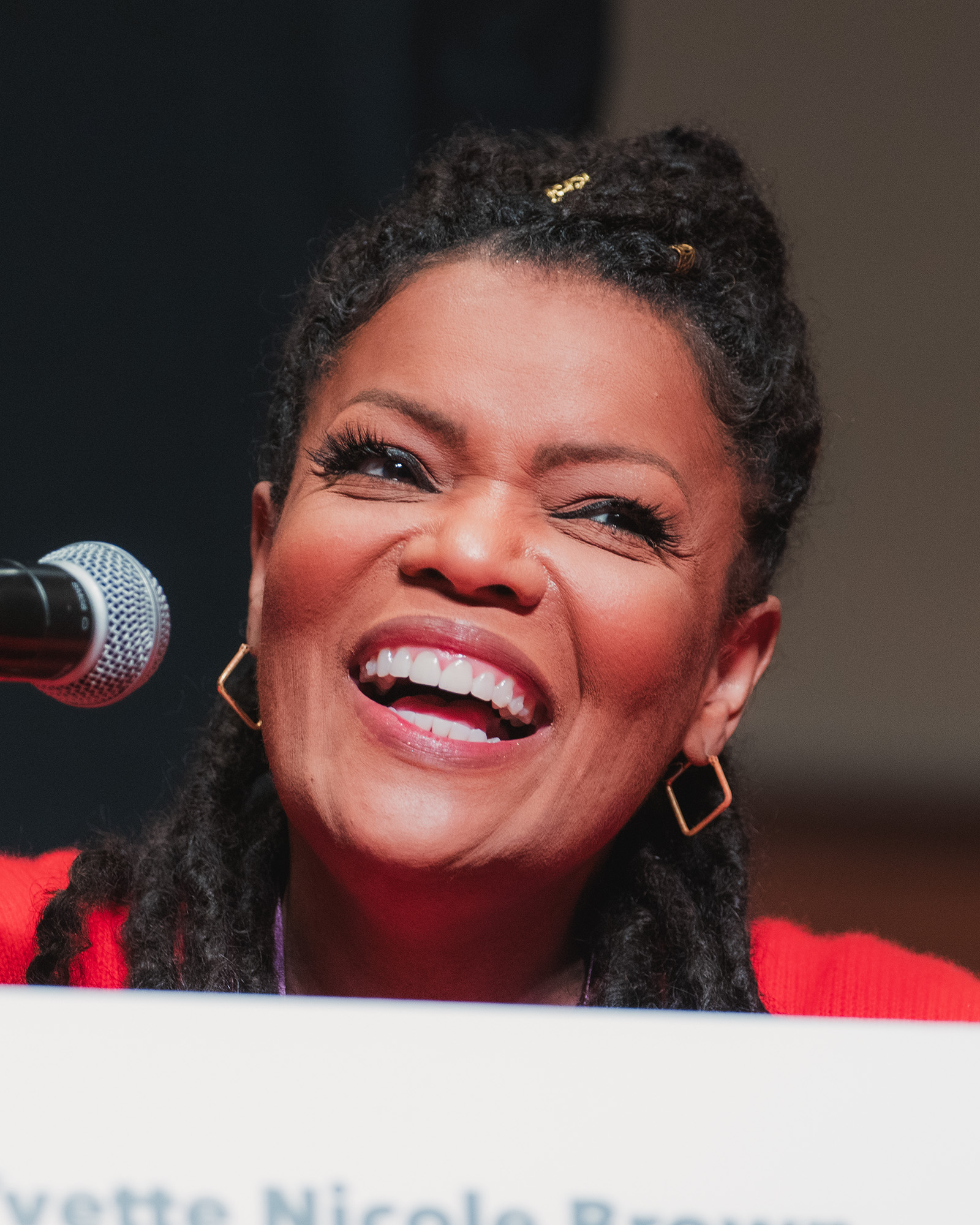
Yvette Nicole Brown

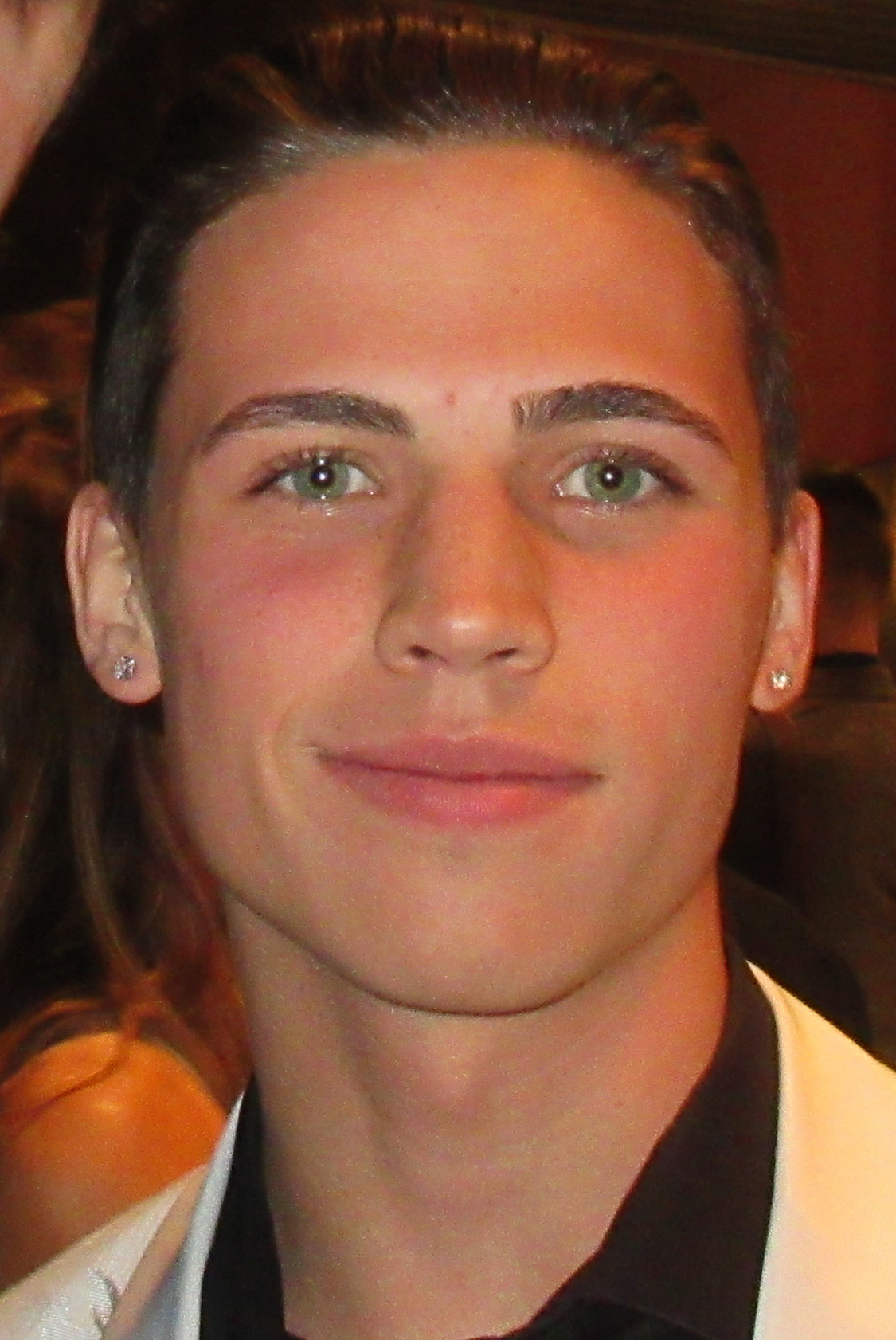
Tanner Buchanan

- Jake Abel (actor) (Canton)
- Tom Aldredge (actor) (Dayton)
- Louis Aldrich (actor) (Cincinnati)
- Roman Atwood (YouTube personality) (Millersport)
- Catherine Bach (actor) (Warren)
- Jim Backus (actor) (Cleveland)
- Kaye Ballard (actor) (Cleveland)
- Gerry Bamman (actor) (Toledo)
- Lisa Banes (actor) (Chagrin Falls)
- Theda Bara (actor) (Cincinnati)
- Majel Barrett (actor) (Columbus)
- Wendy Barrie-Wilson (actress) (Loveland)
- Thom Barry (actor) (Cincinnati)
- Richard Basehart (actor) (Zanesville)
- Alan Baxter (actor) (East Cleveland)
- Vanessa Bayer (actor, comedian) (Cleveland)
- Ned Bellamy (actor) (Dayton)
- Jonathan Bennett (actor) (Rossford)
- Halle Berry (actor, fashion model) (Cleveland)
- Andy Biersack (actor and musician) (Cincinnati)
- David Birney (actor) (Cleveland)
- James R. Black (actor) (Lima, Dover)
- Kaitlyn Black (actor) (Copley)
- Susan Blackwell (actor) (Dayton)
- Nina Blackwood (veejay) (Cleveland)
- Randy Blair (actor, writer) (Ironton)
- J. Paul Boehmer (actor) (Dayton)
- Mark Boone Junior (actor) (Cincinnati)
- Andrea Bowen (actor) (Columbus)
- Bill Boyd (actor) (Hendrysburg)
- Bob Braun (talk show host) (Cincinnati)
- Thom Brennaman (sportscaster) (Cincinnati)
- Deanna Brooks (model) (Dayton)
- Richard Brooks (actor) (Cleveland)
- Charles Brown (actor) (Cleveland)
- Clancy Brown (actor) (Urbana)
- Joe E. Brown (actor) (Holgate/Toledo)
- Woody Brown (actor) (Dayton)
- Yvette Nicole Brown (actor) (Warrensville Heights)
- Tanner Buchanan (actor) (Ottawa)
- Rebecca Budig (actor) (Cincinnati)
- Jarrod Bunch (actor, ex-football player) (Ashtabula)
- Michelle Burke (actor) (Defiance)
- Brandy Burre (actor) (Sandusky)
- Steve Burton (actor) (Cleveland)
- Daws Butler (voice actor) (Toledo)
- Ralph Byrd (actor) (Dayton)
- Marion Byron (actor) (Dayton)

C–D

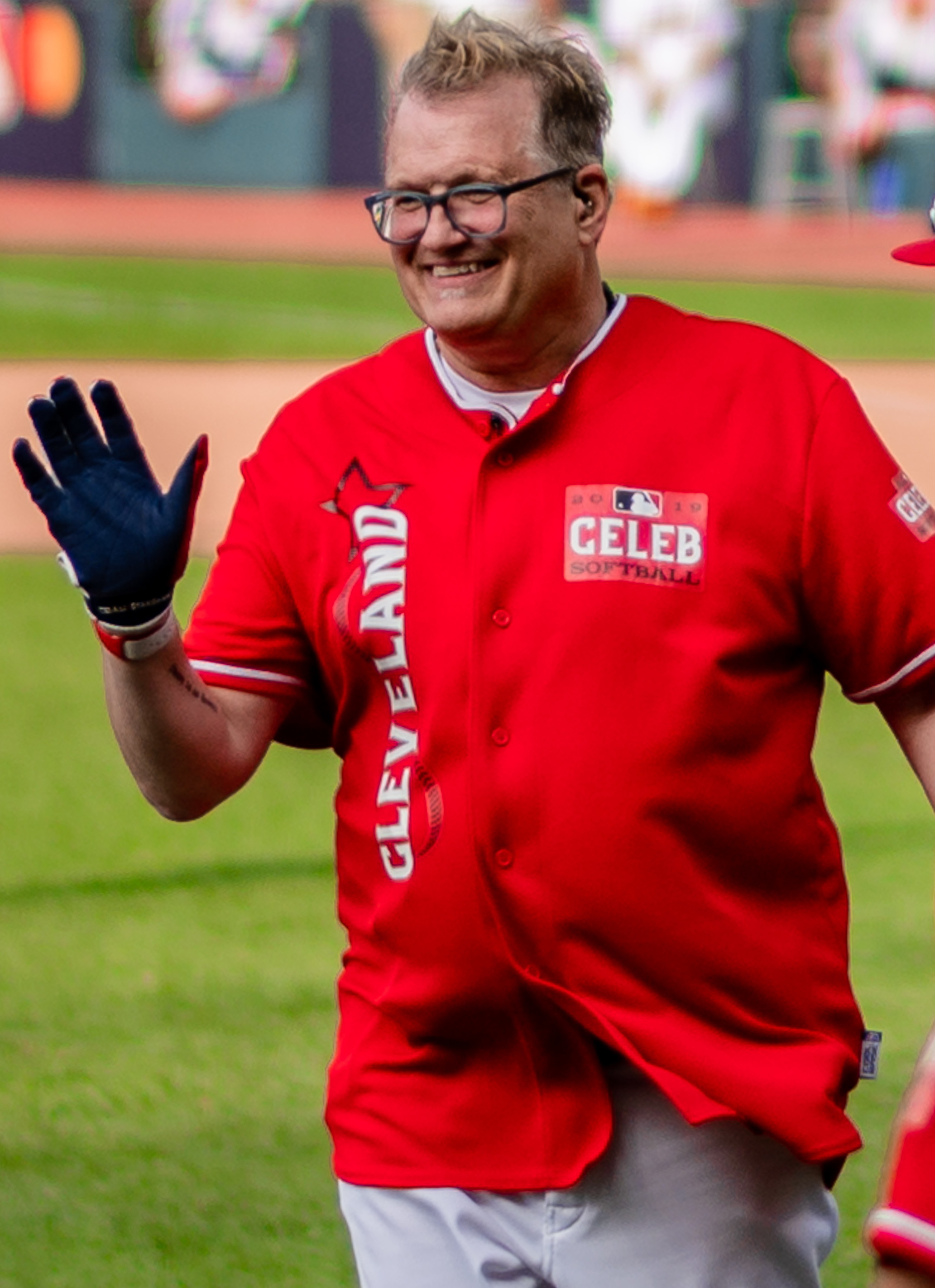
Drew Carey

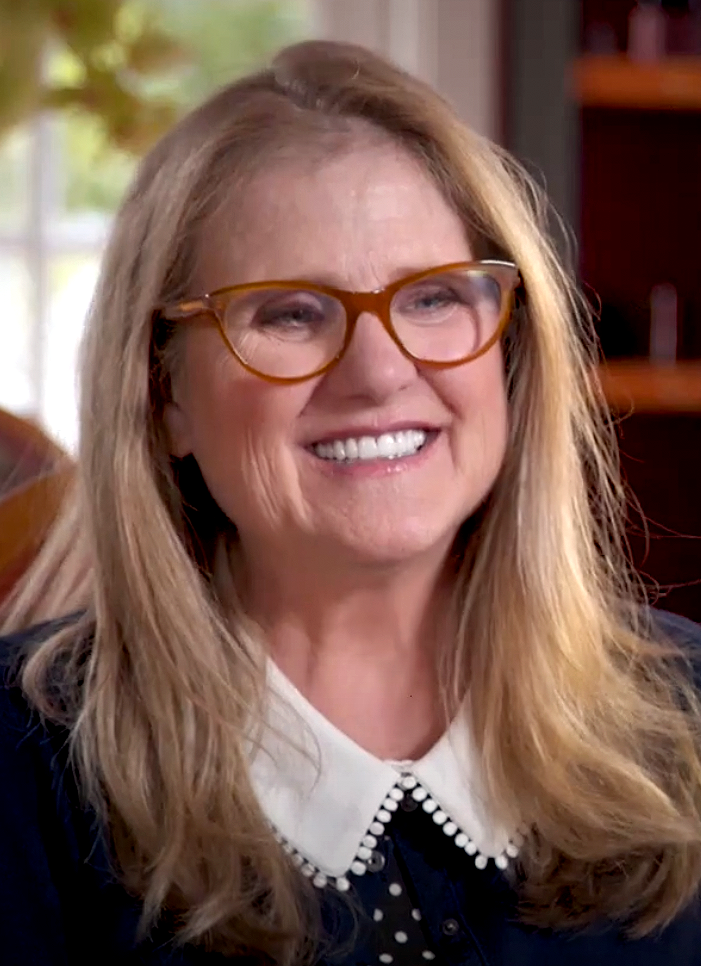
Nancy Cartwright

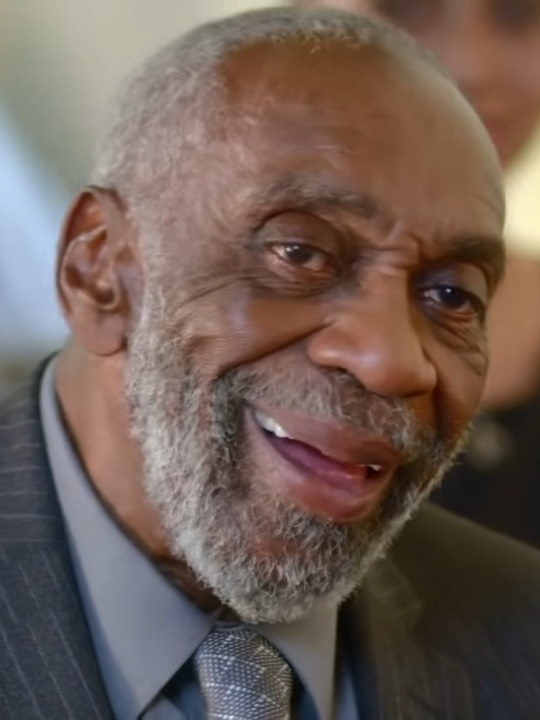
Bill Cobbs

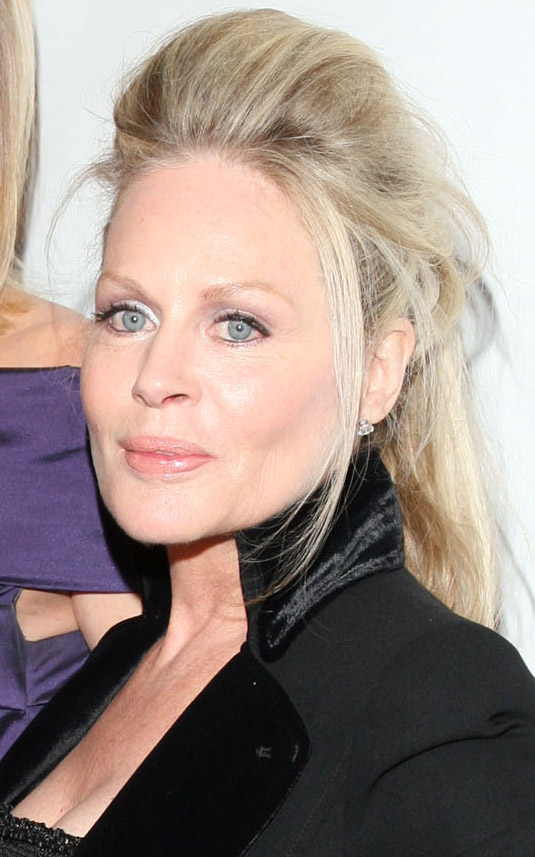
Beverly D'Angelo

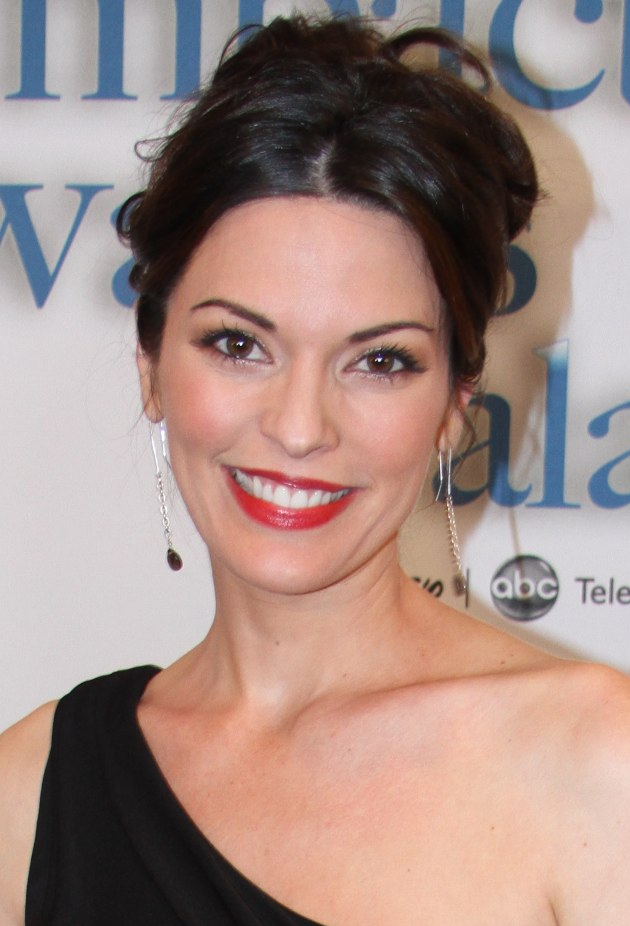
Alana de la Garza

- Mary Katherine Campbell (Miss America 1922, 1923) (Columbus)
- John Caparulo (comedian) (East Liverpool)
- Drew Carey (actor, comedian) (Cleveland)
- Rocky Carroll (actor) (Cincinnati)
- Nancy Cartwright (voice performer) (Kettering/Dayton)
- George Chakiris (actor) (Norwood)
- Justin Chambers (actor) (Springfield)
- Damian Chapa (actor) (Dayton)
- Dave Chappelle (comedian, actor) (Yellow Springs)
- Marguerite Clark (actor) (Avondale)
- Mystro Clark (actor) (Dayton)
- Bill Cobbs (actor) (Cleveland)
- Ray Combs (game show host) (Hamilton)
- Tim Conway (actor, comedian) (Willoughby)
- Chuck Cooper (actor) (Cleveland)
- Casey Cott (actor) (Chagrin Falls, Cleveland)
- Corey Cott (actor) (Chagrin Falls, Cleveland)
- Franklin Cover (actor) (Cleveland)
- Laura Cover (model) (Bucyrus)
- Yvonne Craig (actor) (Columbus)
- Jim Cummings (voice actor) (Youngstown)
- Stephen Curry (basketball) (Akron)
- Dorothy Dandridge (actor, singer) (Cleveland)
- Beverly D'Angelo (actor) (Columbus)
- Frank Daniels (actor, Captain Jinks) (Dayton)
- Charles Michael Davis (actor) (Dayton)
- Duane Davis (actor) (Cleveland)
- Doris Day (actor) (Cincinnati)
- Alana de la Garza (actor) (Columbus)
- Carmella DeCesare (model) (Avon Lake)
- Brooklyn Decker (model) (Kettering)
- Ruby Dee (actor) (Cleveland)
- John Diehl (actor) (Cincinnati)
- Phyllis Diller (actor, comedian) (Lima)
- Phil Donahue (talk show host) (Cleveland/Dayton)
- Brian Donlevy (actor) (Cleveland)
- Mike Douglas (actor) (Cleveland)
- Steve Downes (DJ and actor) (Columbus)
- Sue Downey (Miss USA 1965) (Lima)
- Hugh Downs (broadcaster) (Lima, Akron)
- Keir Dullea (actor) (Cleveland)
- Josh Dun (musician) (Columbus)
- Ryan Dunn (actor, stuntman) (Brockville)

E–I

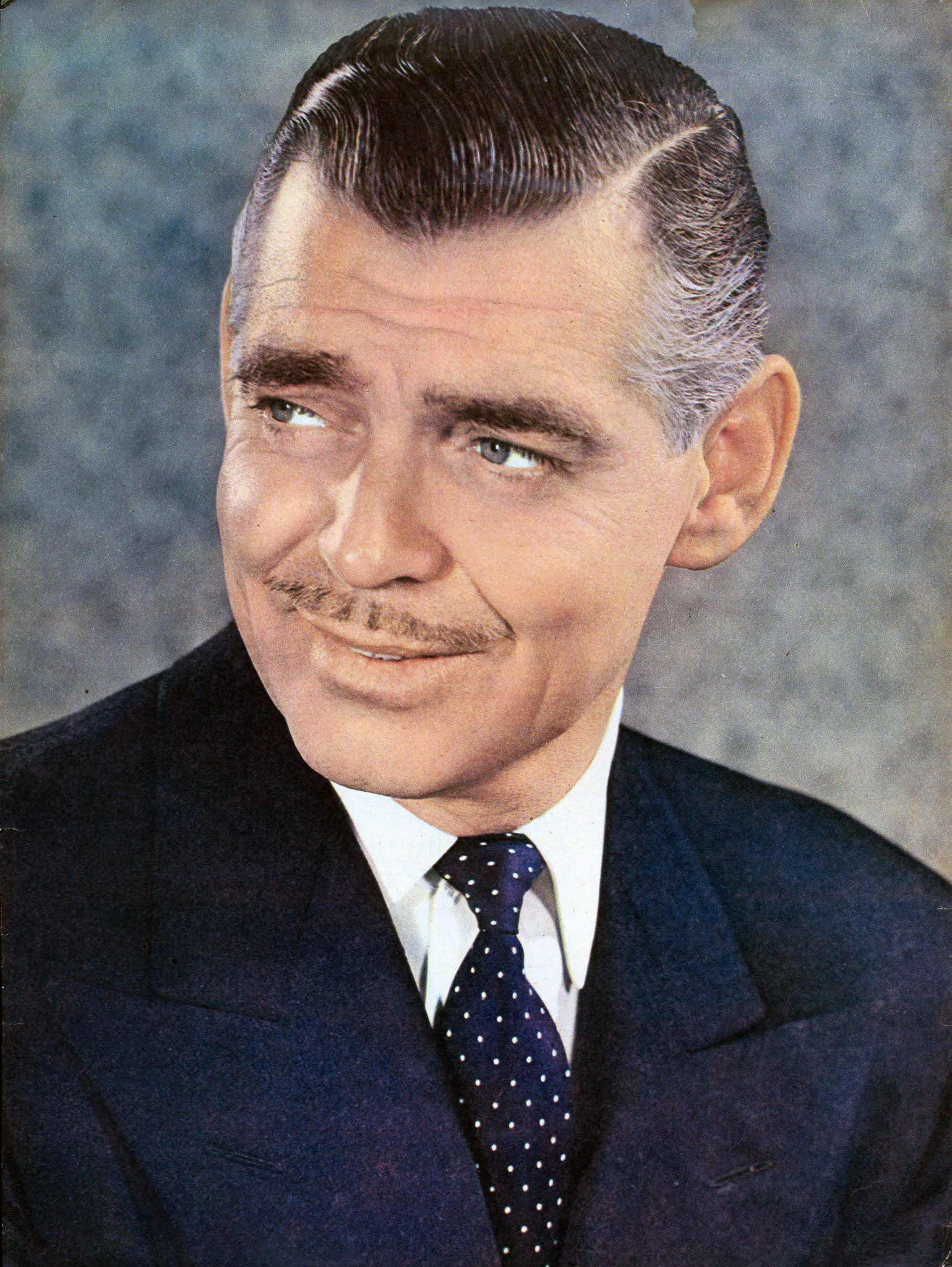
Clark Gable

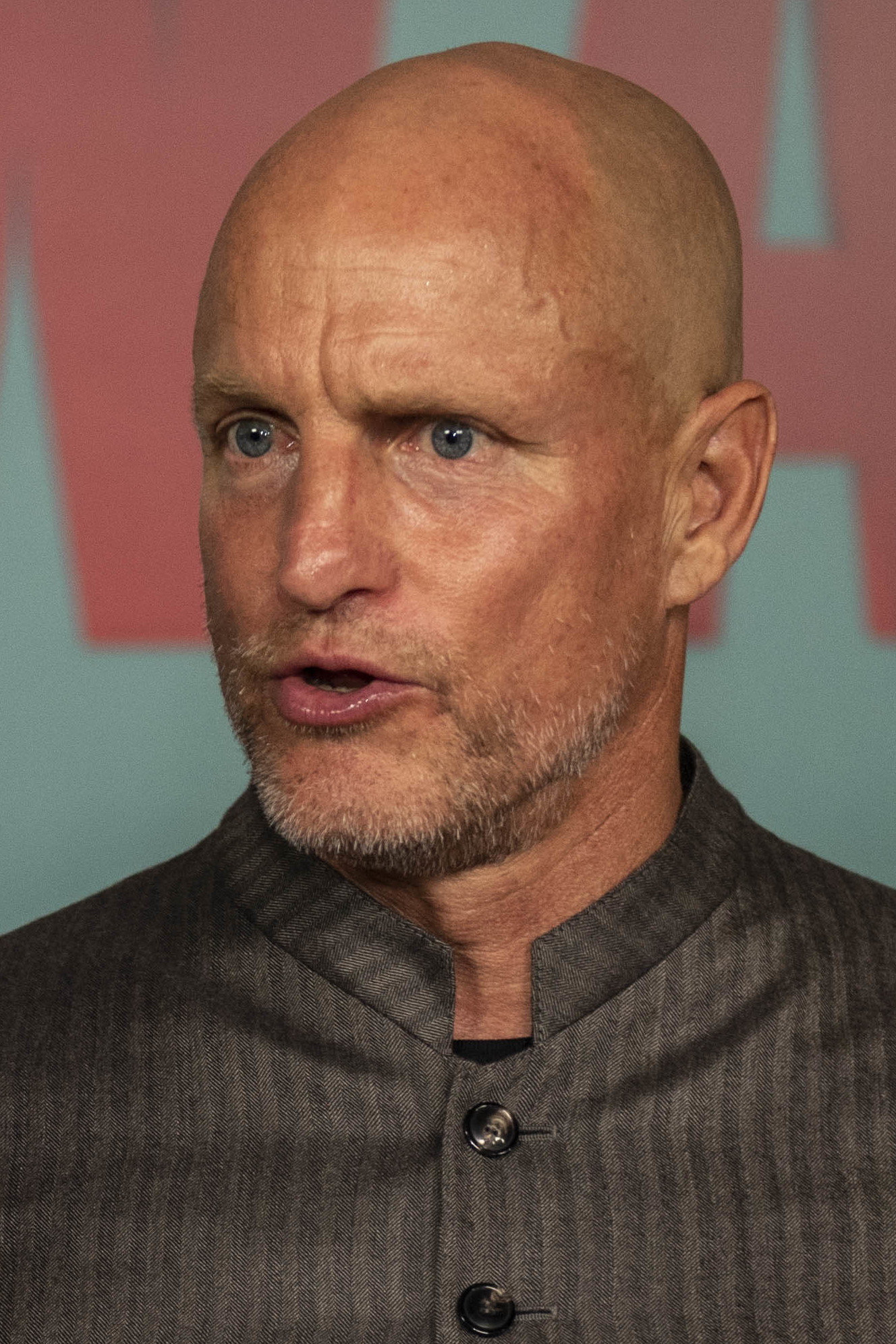
Woody Harrelson

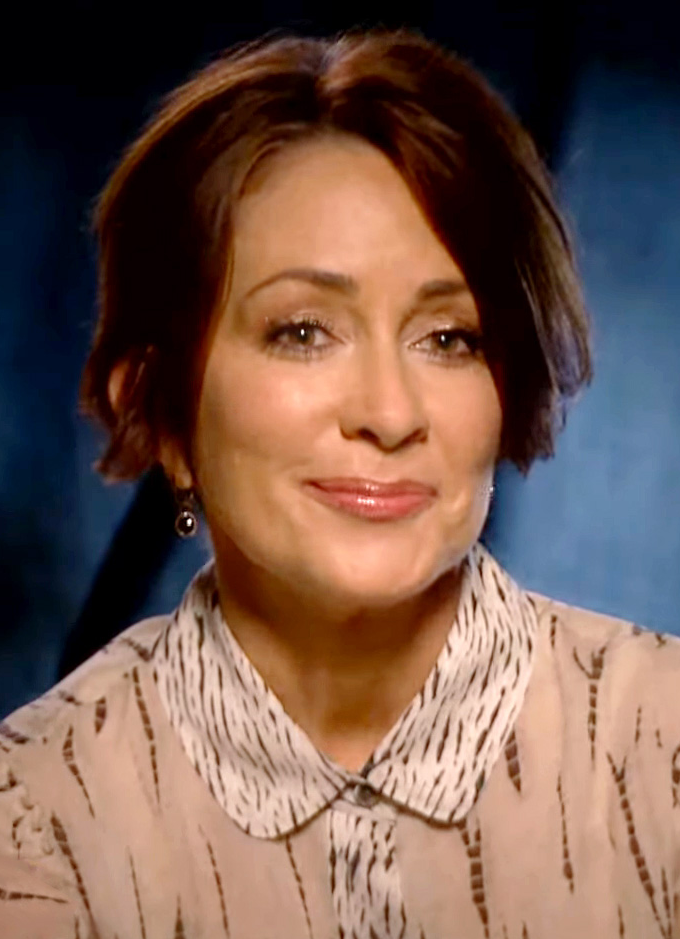
Patricia Heaton

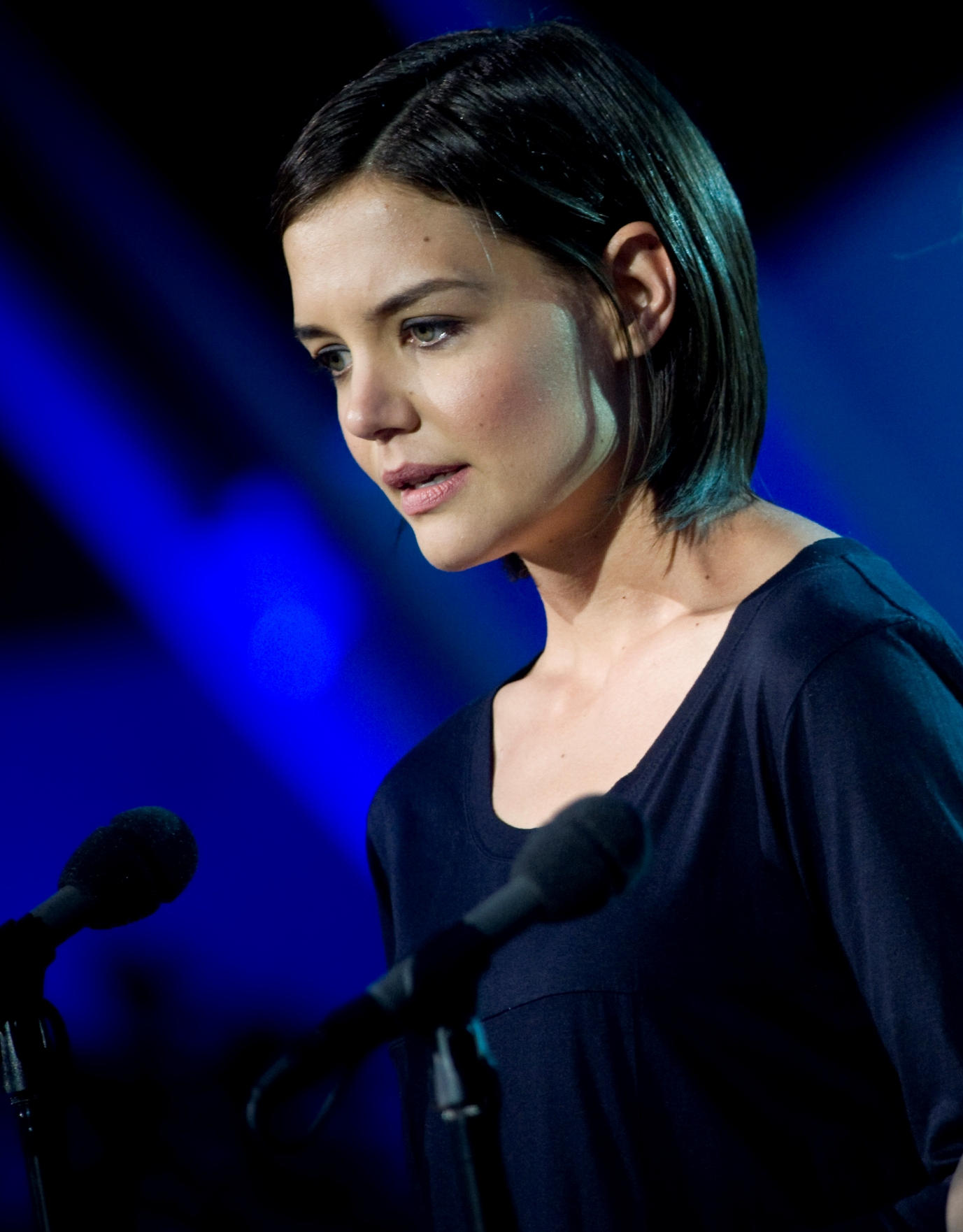
Katie Holmes

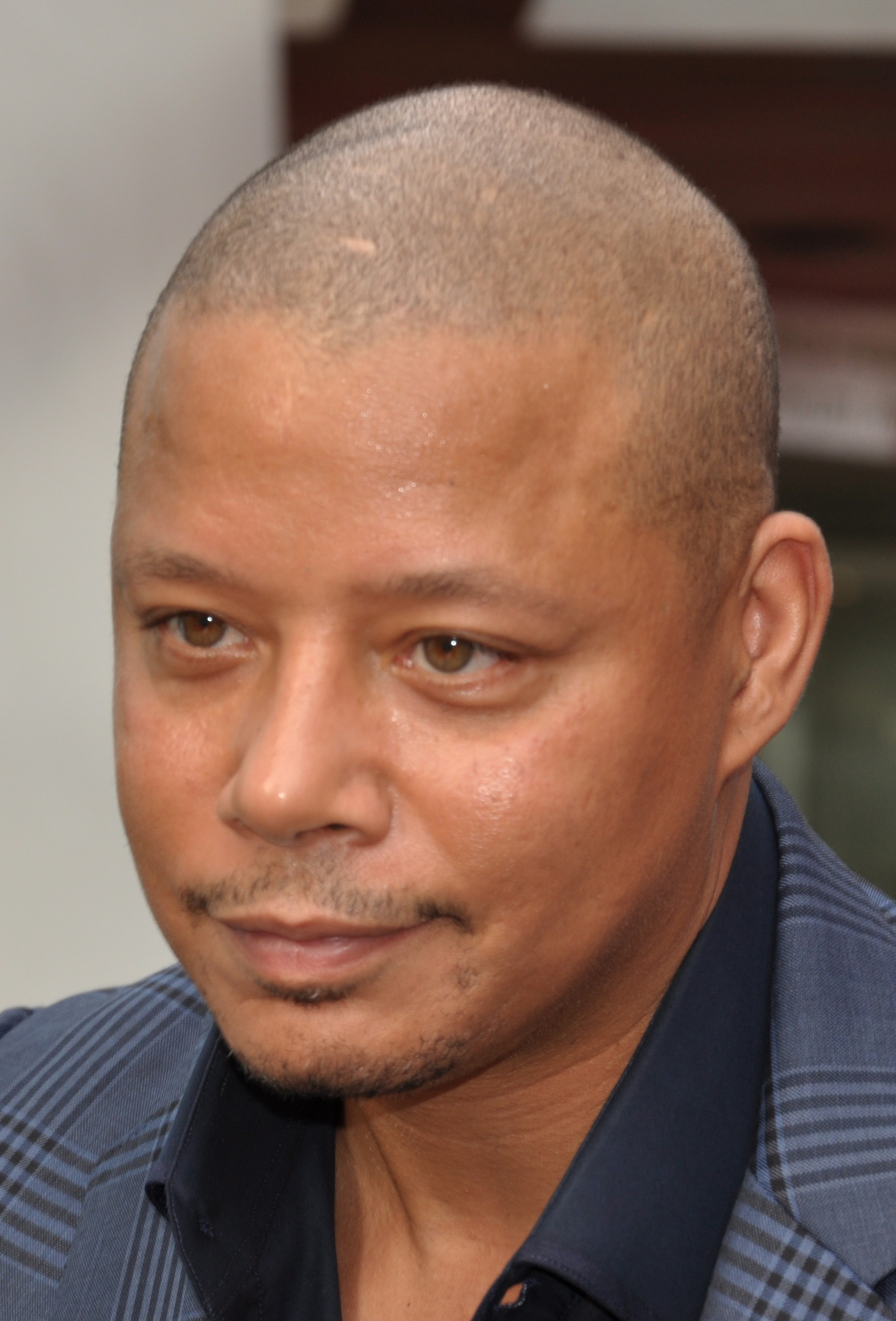
Terrence Howard

- Carmen Electra (model, actor) (Cincinnati/White Oak)
- Joe Estevez (actor) (Dayton)
- Angie Everhart (fashion model) (Akron)
- Mike Faist (actor) (Gahanna)
- Sean Faris (actor, model) (Parma)
- Jamie Farr (actor) (Toledo)
- Suzanne Farrell (dancer) (Cincinnati)
- Guy Fieri (restaurateur, author, television presenter) (Columbus)
- Susan Floyd (actor) (Cincinnati)
- Joe Flynn (actor) (Youngstown)
- Leo Ford (adult entertainment performer) (Dayton)
- Alan Freed (radio show host, coined phrase "rock 'n roll") (Cleveland)
- Emma Sheridan Fry (actor, writer) (Painesville)
- Clark Gable (actor) (Cadiz)
- Mike Gallagher (syndicated talk radio host) (Dayton)
- Teri Garr (actor) (Lakewood)
- Dorothy Gish (actor) (Dayton)
- Lillian Gish (actor) (Springfield)
- Nikki Glaser (comedian) (Cincinnati)
- Carlin Glynn (actor) (Cleveland)
- Dody Goodman (actor) (Columbus)
- Maggie Grace (actor) (Columbus)
- David Graf (actor) (Lancaster)
- Joel Grey (actor, singer, dancer) (Cleveland)
- Julie Hagerty (actor) (Cincinnati)
- Kathryn Hahn (actor) (Cleveland Heights)
- Arsenio Hall (comedian, talk show host, actor) (Cleveland)
- Porter Hall (actor) (Cincinnati)
- Margaret Hamilton (actor) (Cleveland)
- Scott Hamilton (ice skater) (Bowling Green)
- Dorian Harewood (actor) (Dayton)
- Woody Harrelson (actor) (Lebanon)
- Rachael Harris (actress/comedian) (Worthington)
- Steve Harvey (comedian/actor) (Cleveland)
- Patricia Heaton (actor) (Bay Village)
- Anne Heche (actor) (Aurora)
- Eileen Heckart (actor) (Columbus)
- Hugh Hewitt (radio talk show host) (Warren)
- Tiffany Hines (actress, singer) (Cincinnati)
- Tony Hinchcliffe (comedian) (Youngstown)
- Michael Hitchcock (actor) (Defiance)
- John Hockenberry (broadcaster) (Dayton)
- Stephanie Hodge (actress) (Wilmington)
- Hal Holbrook (actor) (Cleveland)
- Michael Holley (sports commentator) (Akron)
- Lindsay Hollister (actress) (Columbus)
- John Holmes (adult entertainment performer) (Ashville)
- Katie Holmes (actor) (Toledo)
- Bob Hope (comedian, actor) (Cleveland)
- John Howard (actor) (Cleveland)
- Terrence Howard (actor) (Cleveland)

J–M

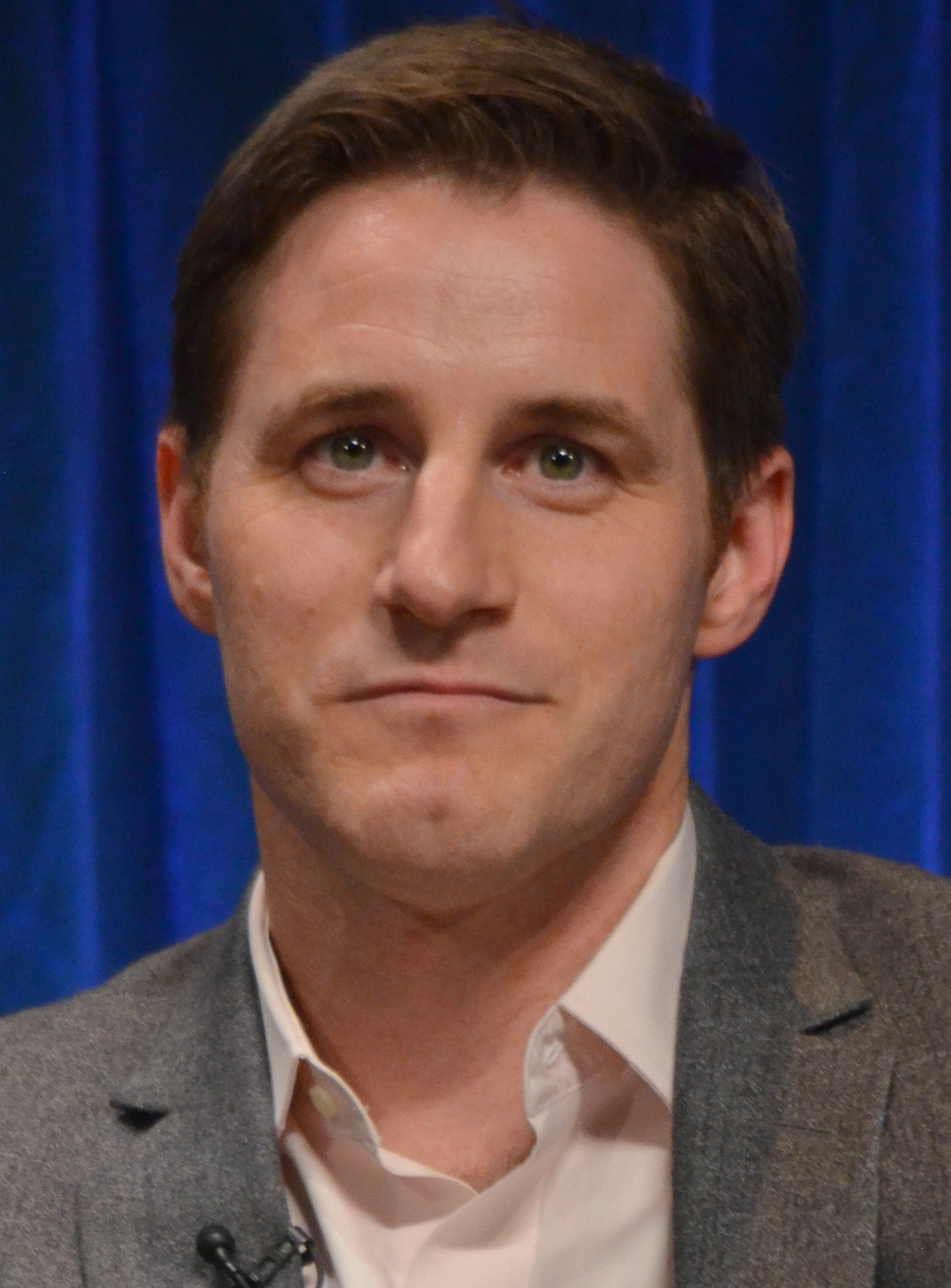
Sam Jaeger

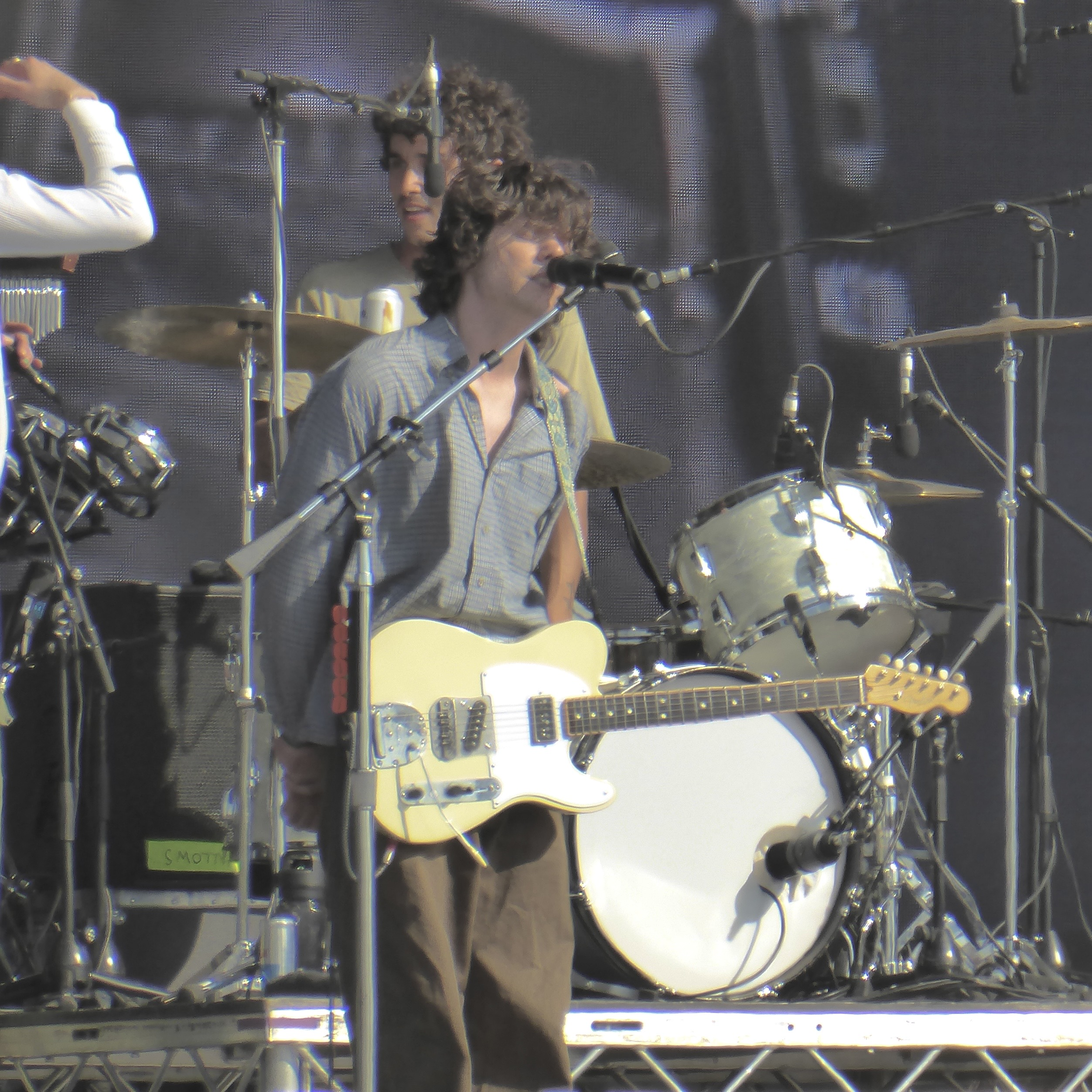
Braeden Lemasters

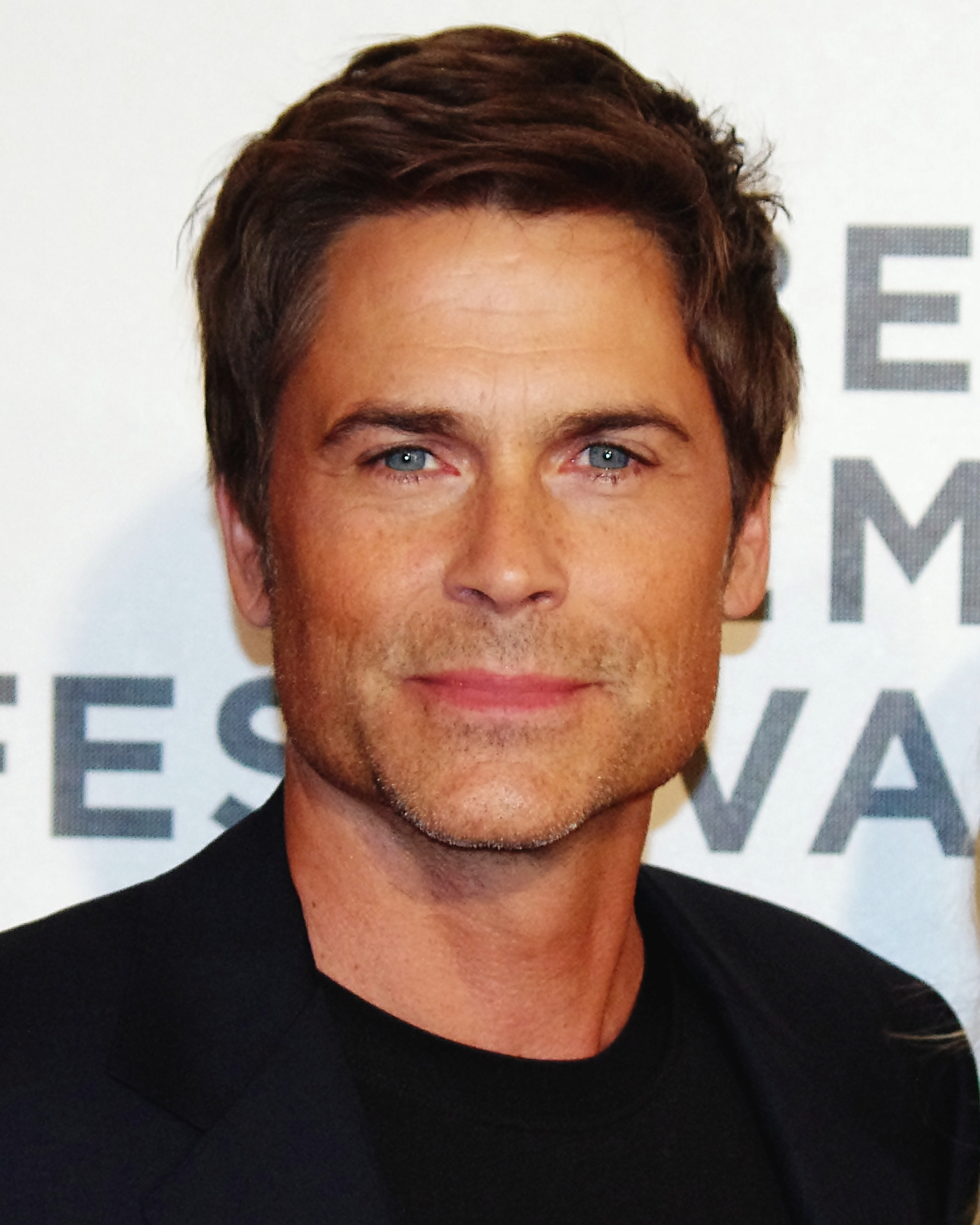
Rob Lowe

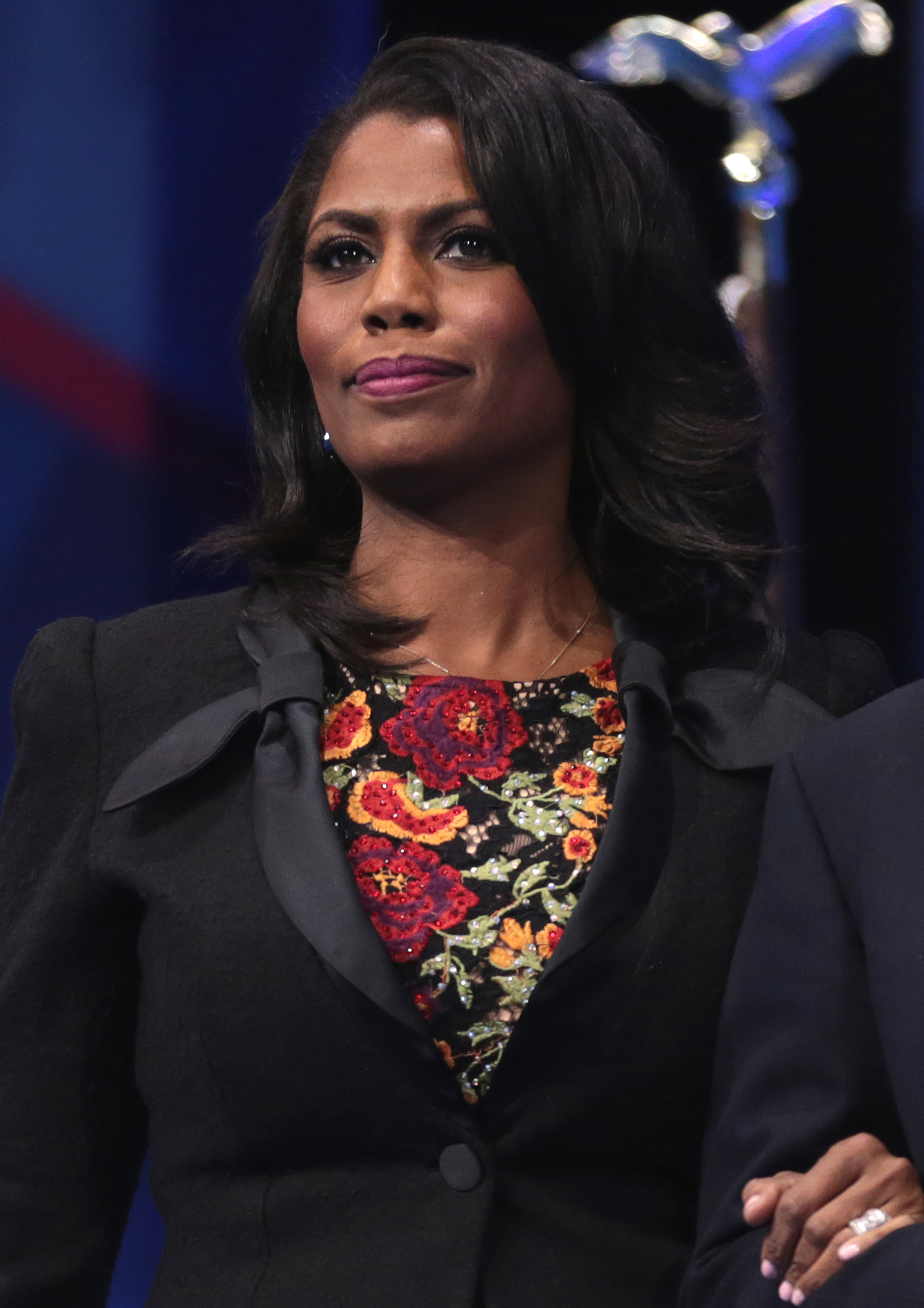
Omarosa Manigault Newman

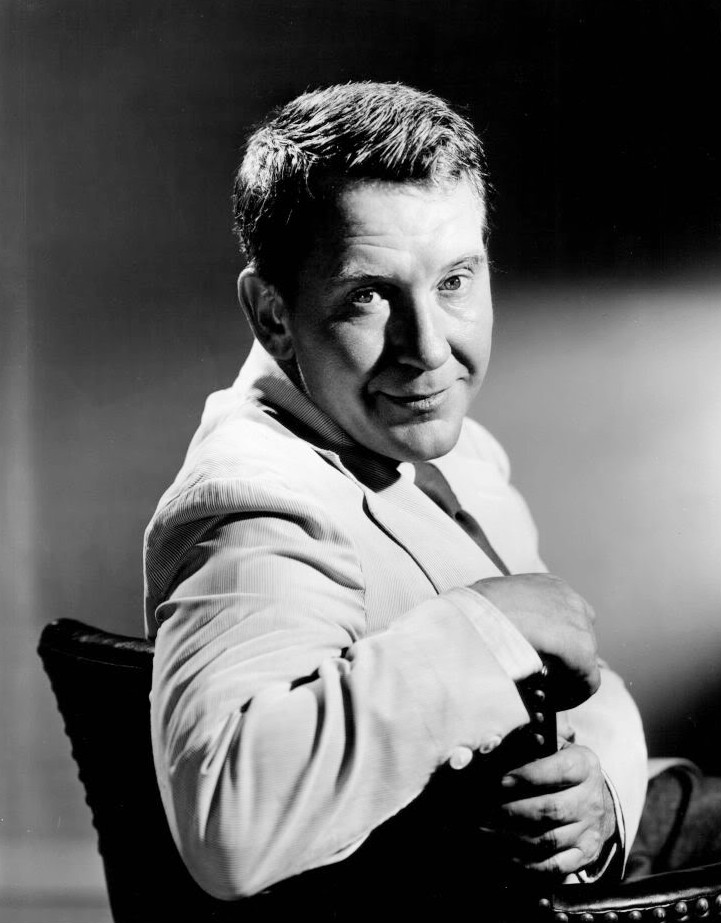
Burgess Meredith

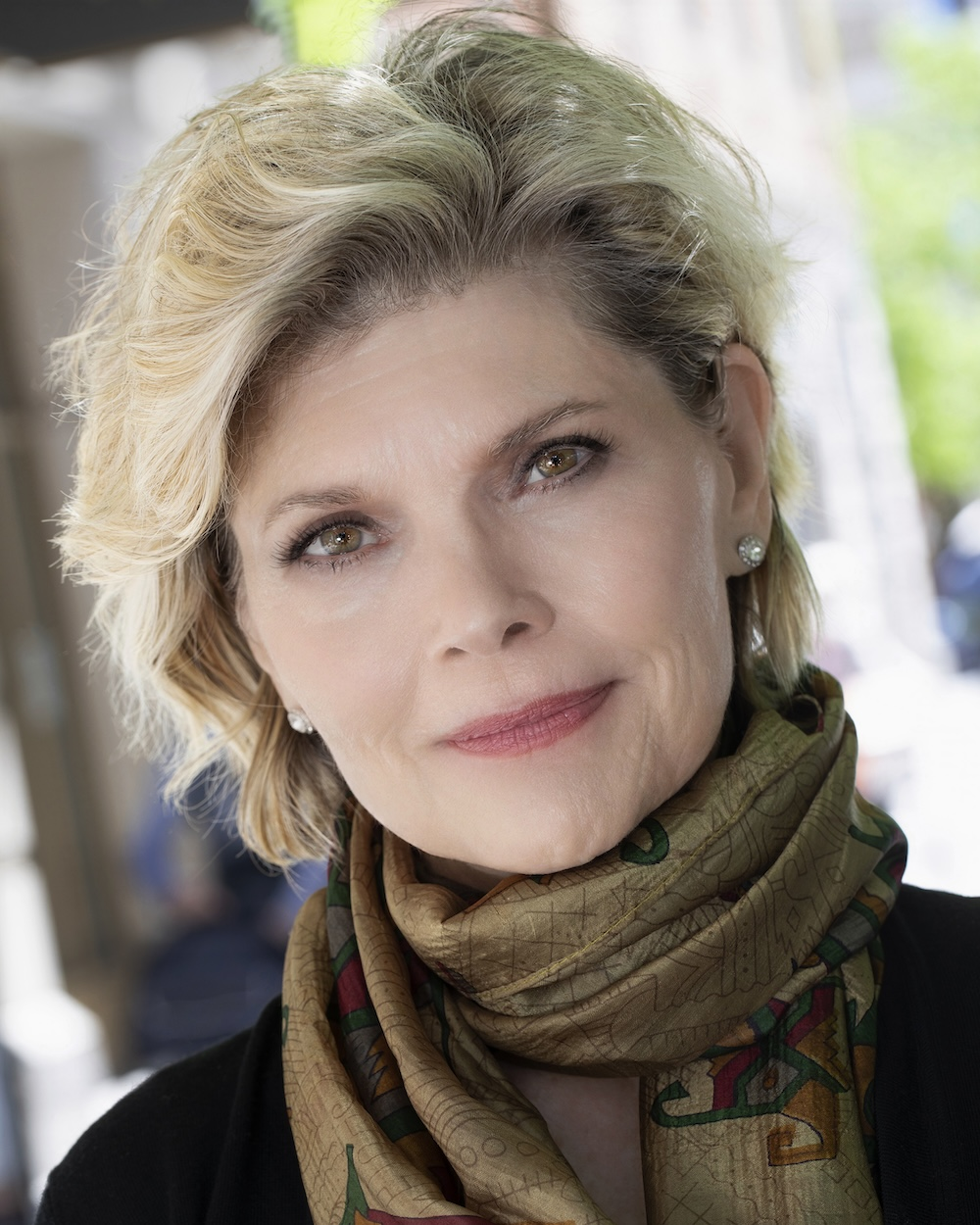
Debra Monk

- Sam Jaeger (actor, writer, and director) (Perrysburg)
- Dean Jagger (actor) (Columbus Grove)
- Elsie Janis (actor) (Columbus)
- Allison Janney (actor) (Dayton)
- Ken Jenkins (actor) (Dayton)
- Toccara Elaine Jones (contestant on America's Next Top Model) (Dayton)
- Tyler Joseph (musician) (Columbus)
- Gordon Jump (actor) (Dayton)
- Melina Kanakaredes (actor) (Akron)
- Carol Kane (actor) (Cleveland)
- Maynard James Keenan (Musician) (Ravenna)
- Michael Kent (comedian/magician) (Urbana)
- Perry King (actor) (Alliance)
- Scott Klace (actor) (Westerville)
- Robert Knepper (actor in Prison Break) (Maumee)
- Heather Kozar (model) (Akron)
- Allie LaForce (Miss Teen USA 2005) (Vermilion)
- Eric Lange (actor) (Hamilton)
- A. J. Langer (actor) (Columbus)
- Matt Lanter (actor) (Massillon)
- Dick Latessa (actor) (Cleveland)
- KiKi Layne (actress) (Cincinnati)
- Joshua LeBar (actor) (Cincinnati)
- Reggie Lee (actor) (Cleveland)
- Rex Lee (actor) (Warren)
- Hudson Leick (actor) (Cincinnati)
- Braeden Lemasters (actor) (Warren)
- Gloria LeRoy (actor) (Bucyrus)
- Ted Levine (actor) (Parma)
- Clea Lewis (actress) (Cleveland Heights)
- Mitchell Lichtenstein (actor) (Cleveland)
- John Lithgow (actor) (Yellow Springs)
- Traci Lords (actress) (Steubenville)
- Todd Louiso (actor) (Cincinnati)
- Chad Lowe (actor) (Dayton)
- Rob Lowe (actor) (Dayton)
- Paul Lynde (actor) (Mount Vernon)
- Mike Malloy (radio talk show host) (Toledo)
- Omarosa Manigault-Stallworth (reality television star) (Youngstown)
- Dean Martin (singer, actor, television show host) (Steubenville)
- Marie Masters (actor) (Cincinnati)
- Jacquelyn Mayer (Miss America 1963) (Sandusky)
- Diane McBain (actor) (Cleveland)
- Gates McFadden (actor) (Akron)
- Maeve McGuire (actor) (Cleveland)
- Richard McKinney (executive) (Portsmouth)
- Eve McVeagh (actor) (Cincinnati)
- Robin Meade (news anchor, Miss Ohio 1992) (New London)
- Burgess Meredith (actor) (Cleveland)
- Marilyn Meseke (Miss America 1938) (Lima)
- Mark Metcalf (actor) (Findlay)
- W. Chrystie Miller (actor) (Dayton)
- Walter Miller (actor) (Dayton)
- David Monahan (actor) (North Olmsted)
- Debra Monk (actor) (Middletown)
- Greg Morris (actor) (Columbus)
- Martin Mull (comedian, actor) (North Ridgeville)

N–R

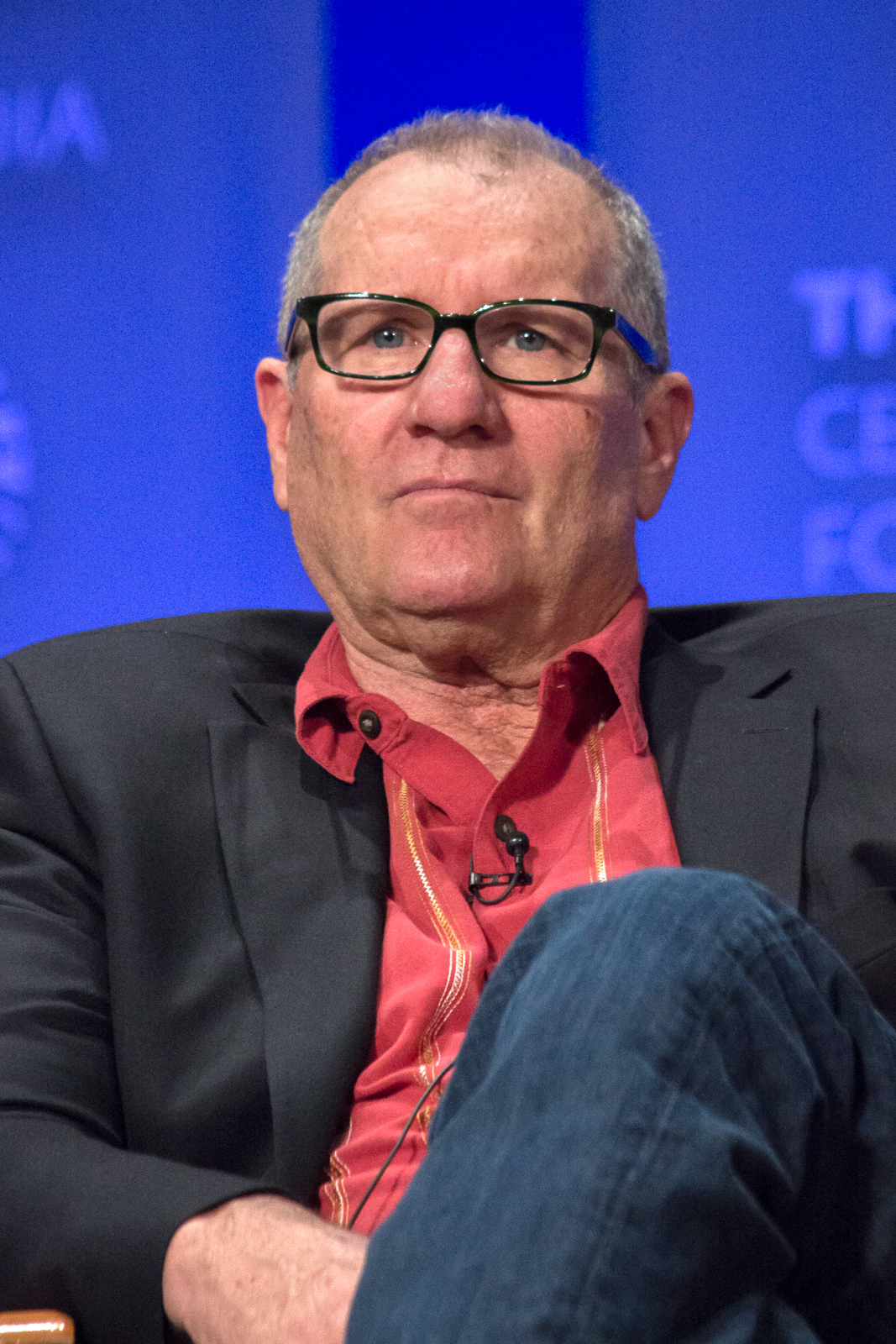
Ed O'Neill

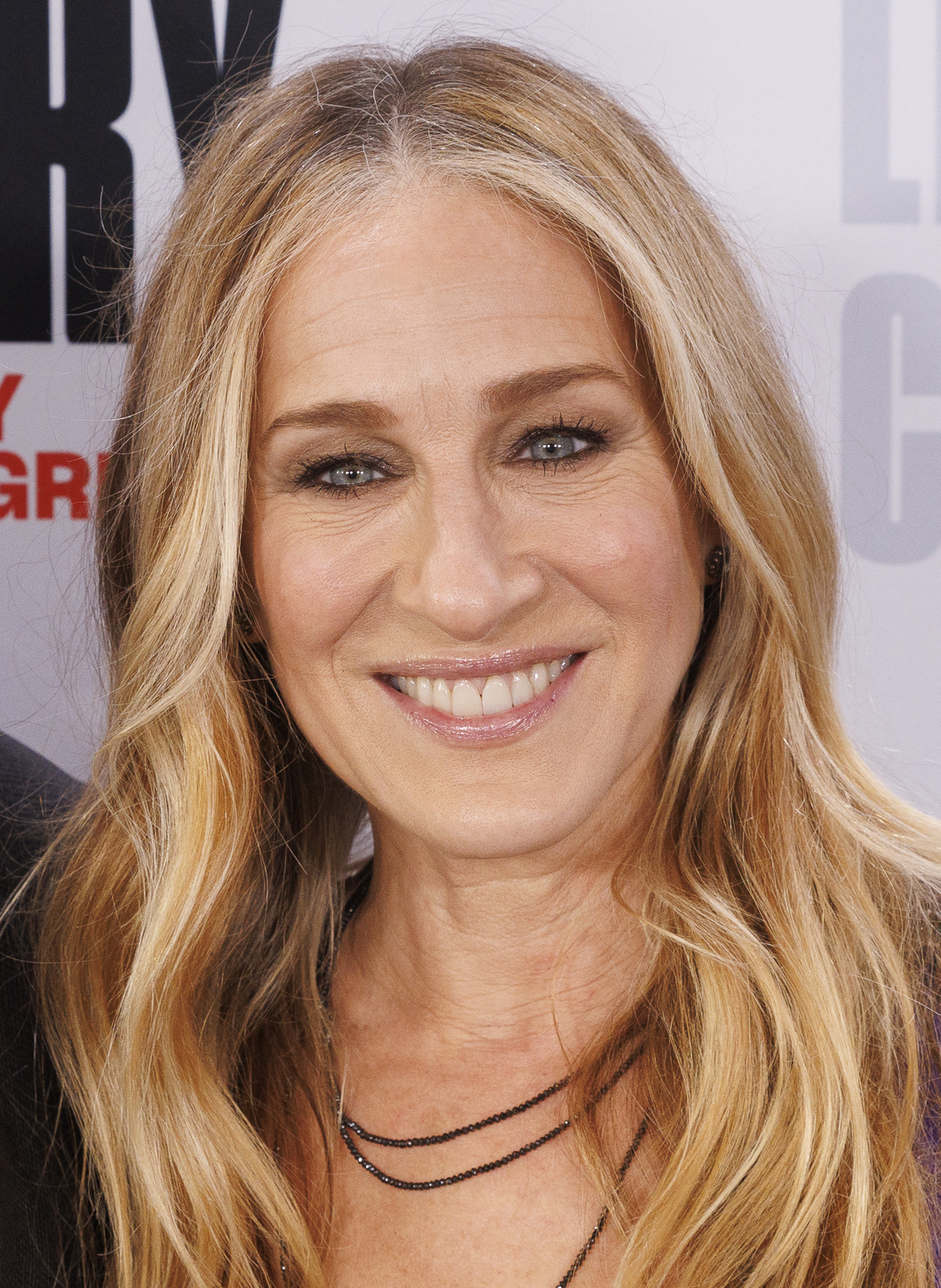
Sarah Jessica Parker

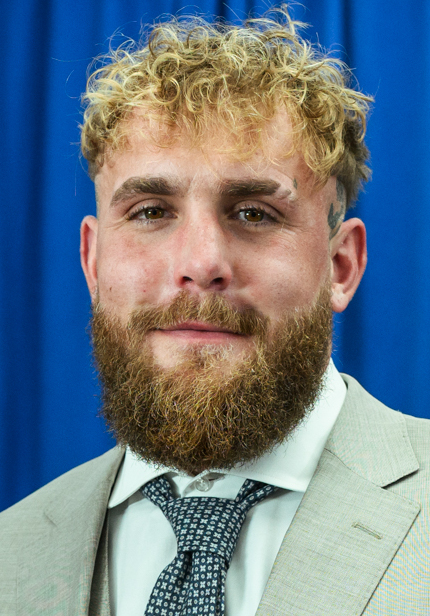
Jake Paul

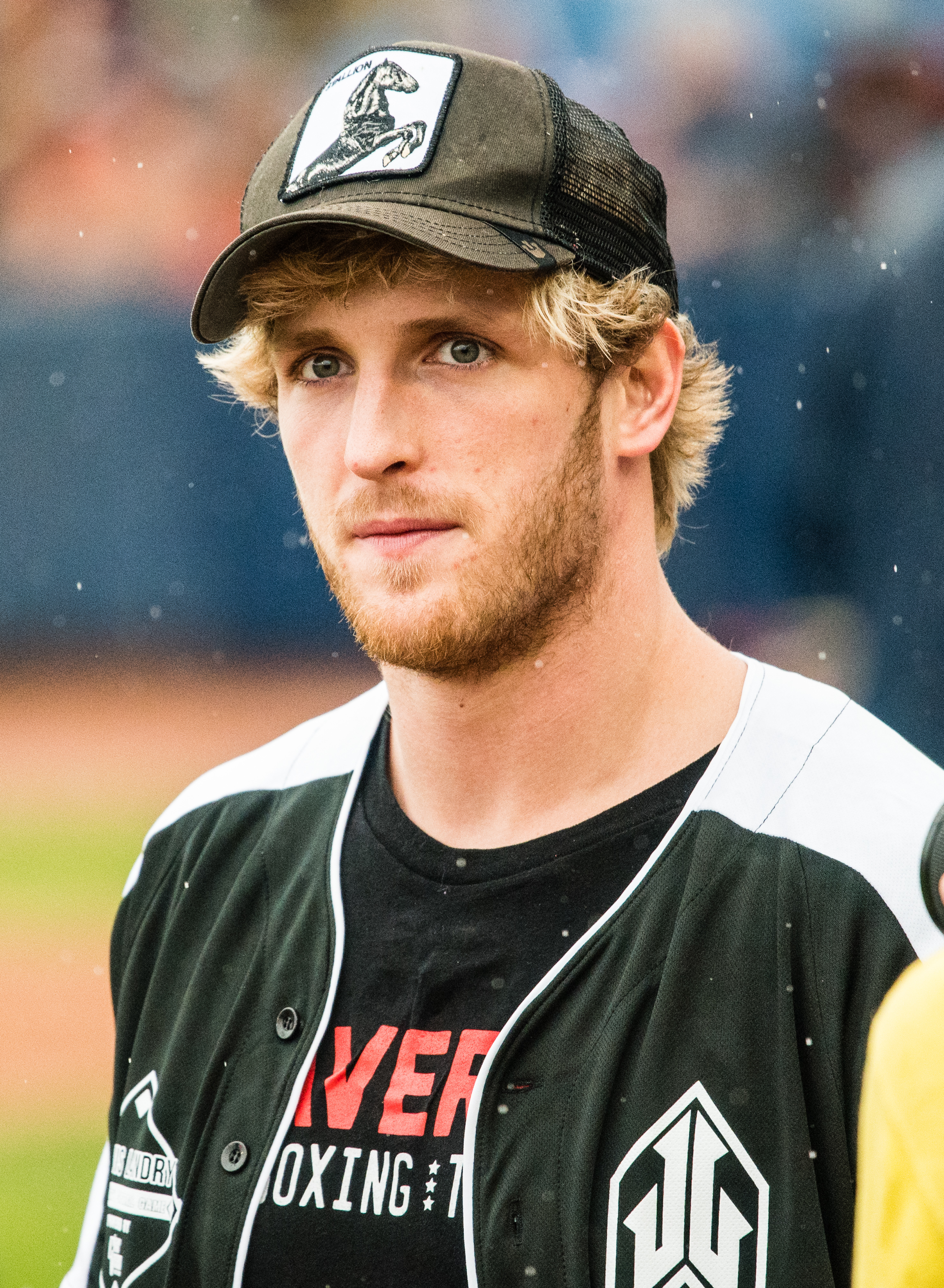
Logan Paul

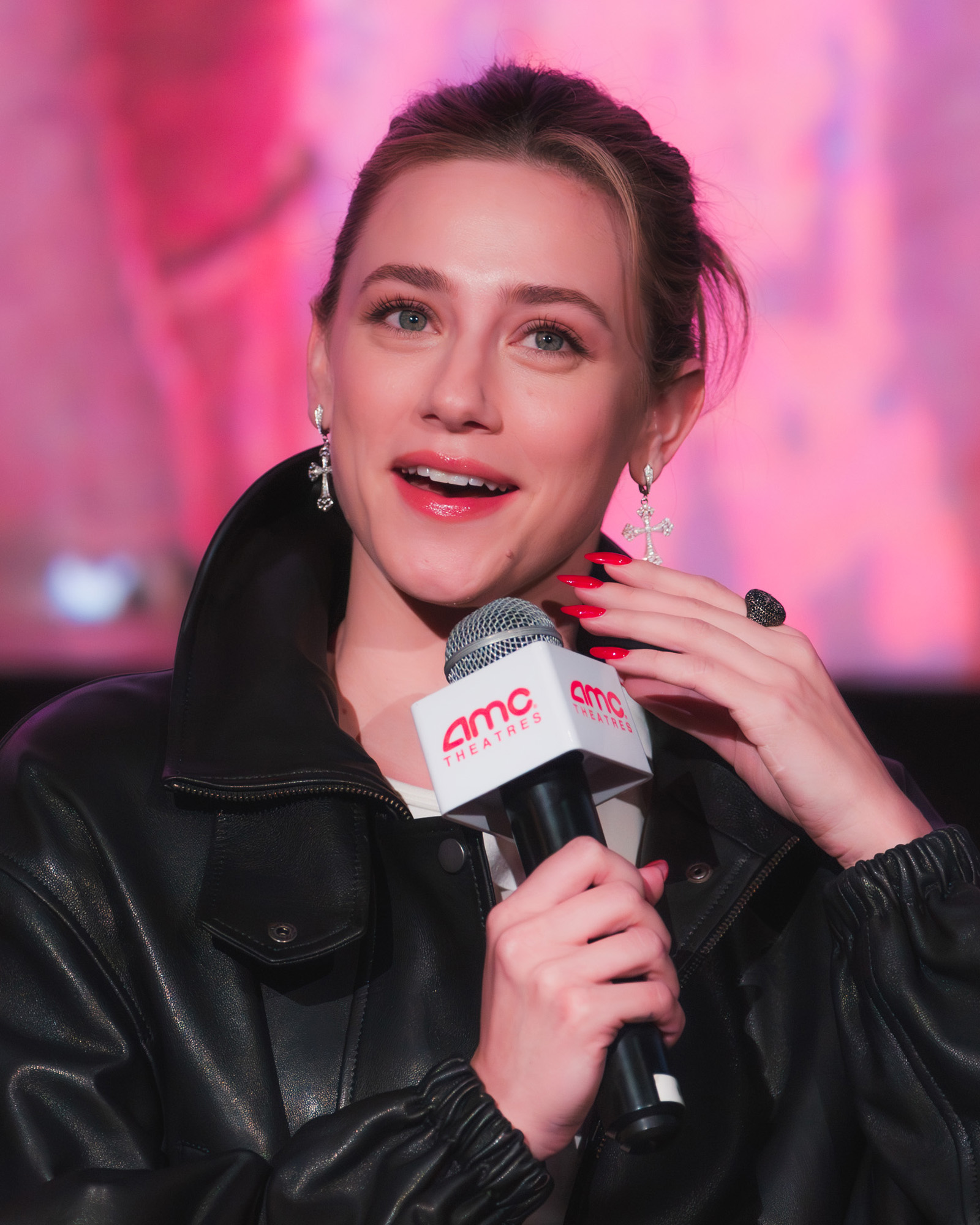
Lili Reinhart

- John Newland (actor, director, producer, scriptwriter) (Cincinnati)
- Paul Newman (actor) (Cleveland)
- Stephen Nichols (actor) (Cincinnati)
- Danielle Nicolet (actor) (Ashtabula)
- Don Novello (comedian, actor) (Lorain)
- Maila Nurmi, Vampira (actor) (Ashtabula)
- Annie Oakley (markswoman) (Greenville)
- Ed O'Neill (actor) (Youngstown)
- Mehmet Oz (cardiothoracic surgeon, author, and television personality) (Cleveland)
- Jack Paar (talk show host) (Canton)
- Lawanda Page (actor) (Cleveland)
- Adrianne Palicki (actress) (Toledo)
- Eleanor Parker (actor) (Cedarville)
- Sarah Jessica Parker (actor) (Cincinnati/Nelsonville)
- Dan Patrick (sportscaster, talk show host) (Mason)
- Robert Patrick (actor) (Cleveland)
- Jake Paul (boxer)
- Logan Paul (actor and internet personality)
- Austin Pendleton (actor) (Warren)
- CeCe Peniston (model, Miss Black Arizona 1989) (Dayton)
- Susan Perkins (Miss America 1978) (Monroe)
- Max Perlich (actor) (Cleveland)
- Luke Perry (actor) (Fredericktown)
- James Pickens Jr. (actor) (Cleveland)
- Dav Pilkey (author) (Cleveland)
- Tom Poston (actor) (Columbus)
- Monica Potter (actor) (Cleveland)
- Mark Povinelli (actor) (Elyria)
- Tyrone Power (actor) (Cincinnati)
- Nicole Pulliam (actor) (Columbus)
- Josh Radnor (actor) (Bexley)
- Victor Raider-Wexler (actor) (Toledo)
- Terry Ray (actor) (Grove City)
- Marge Redmond (actor) (Cleveland)
- Lili Reinhart (actress) (Cleveland)
- Gigi Rice (actor) (Westerville)
- Addison Richards (actor) (Zanesville)
- Sy Richardson (actor) (Cincinnati)
- Matt Rife (comedian, actor) (Columbus)
- Raven Riley (adult entertainment performer)
- Jess Robbins (actor) (Dayton)
- Larry Roberts (actor) (Cleveland)
- Zach Roerig (actor) (Montpelier)
- Roy Rogers (actor) (Cincinnati/Lucasville)
- Ted Ross (actor) (Dayton)
- Alan Ruck (actor) (Cleveland)

S–Z

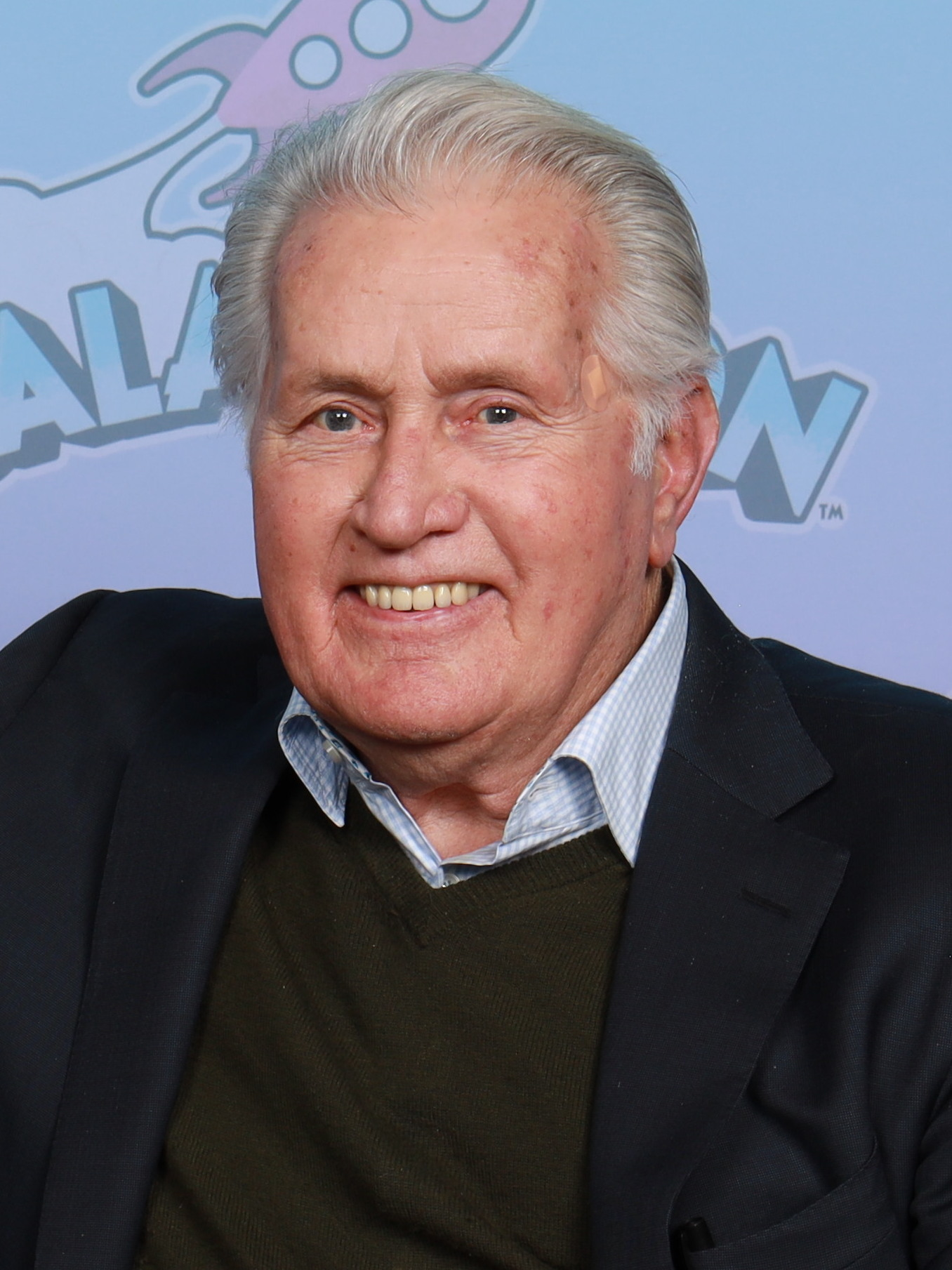
Martin Sheen

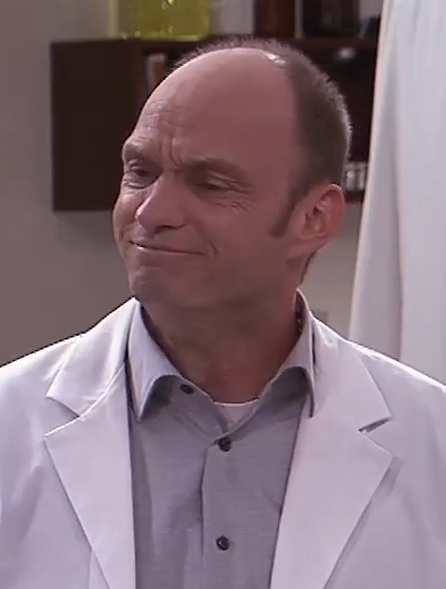
Brian Stepanek

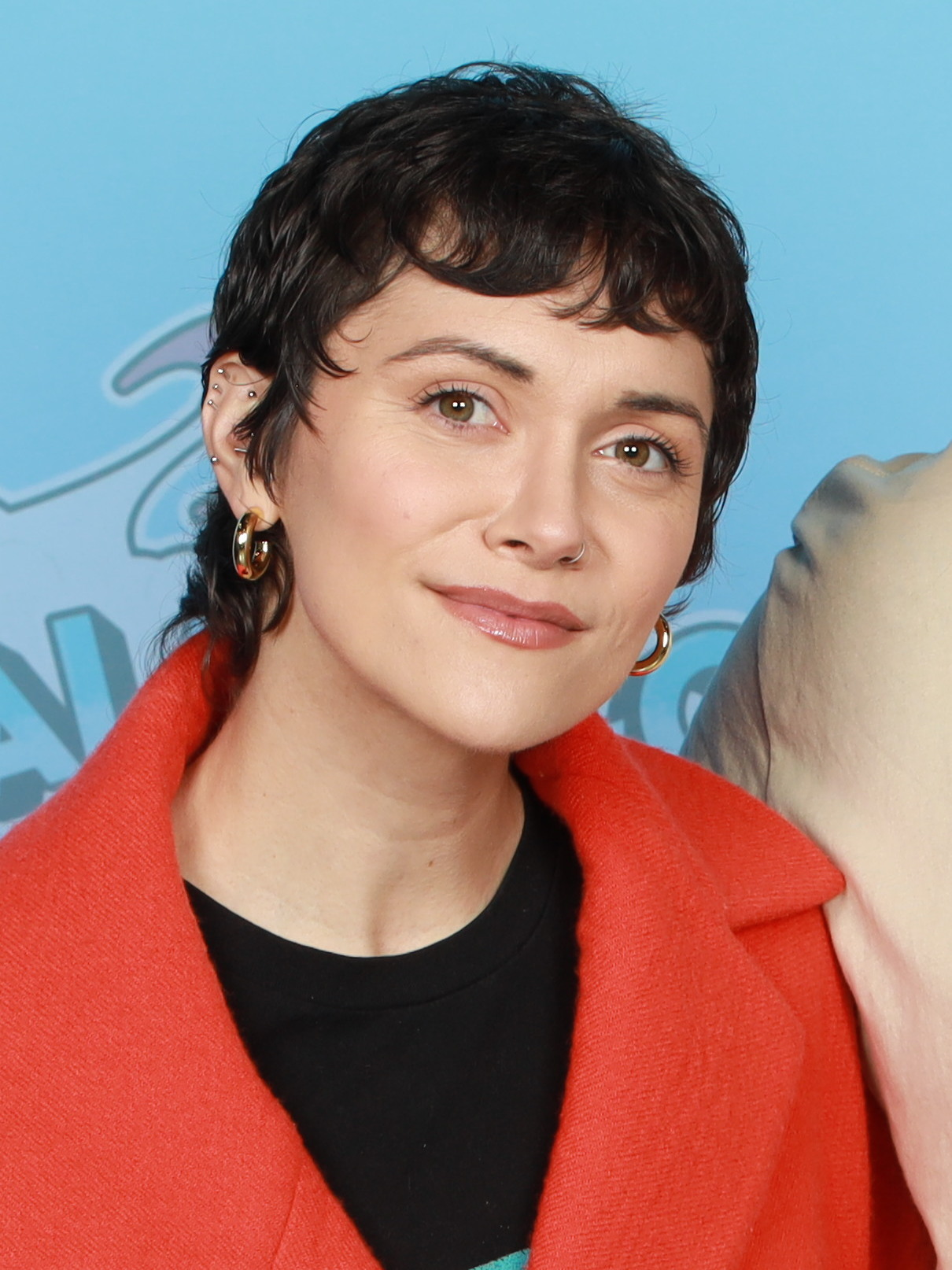
Alyson Stoner

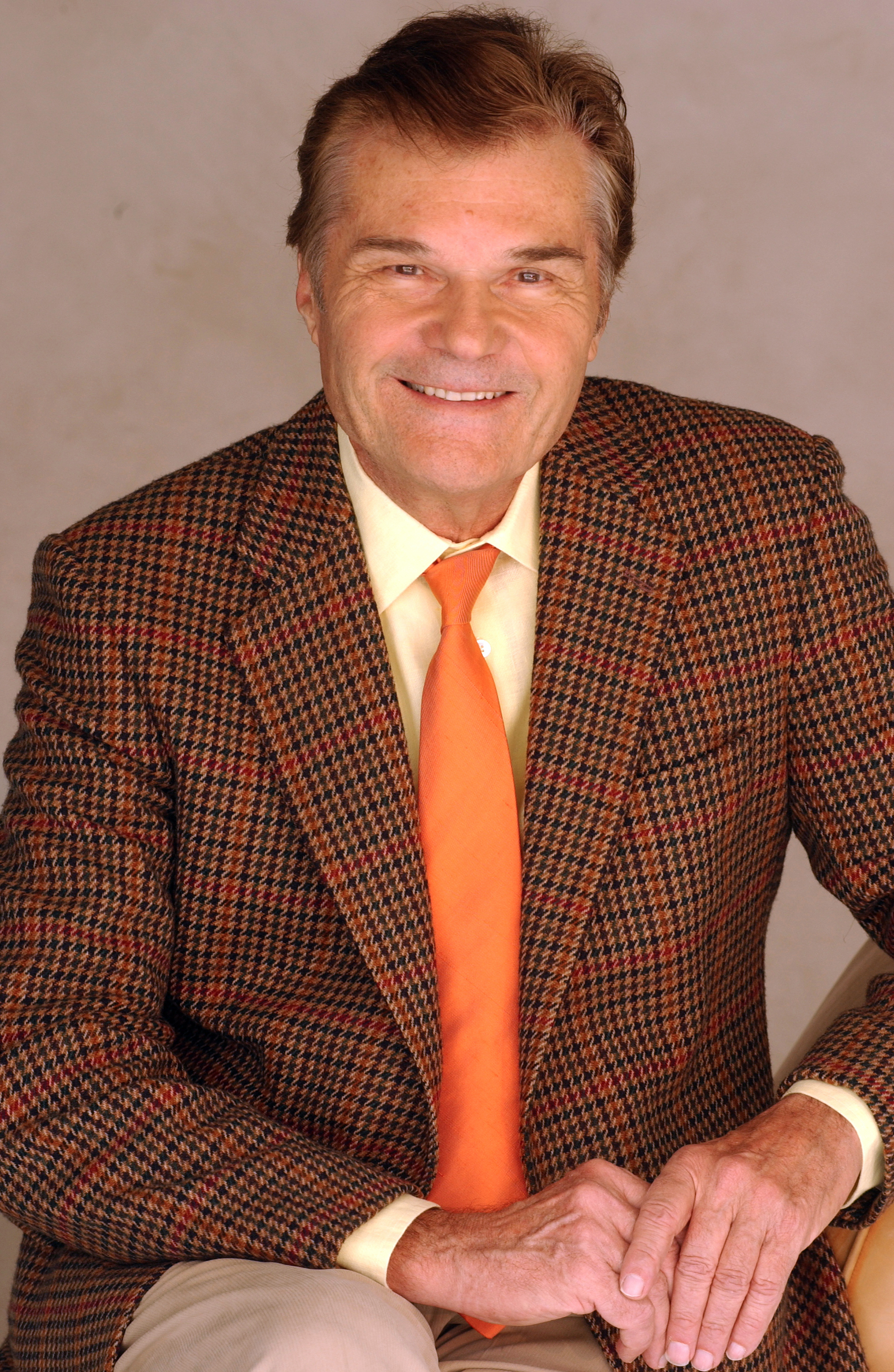
Fred Willard

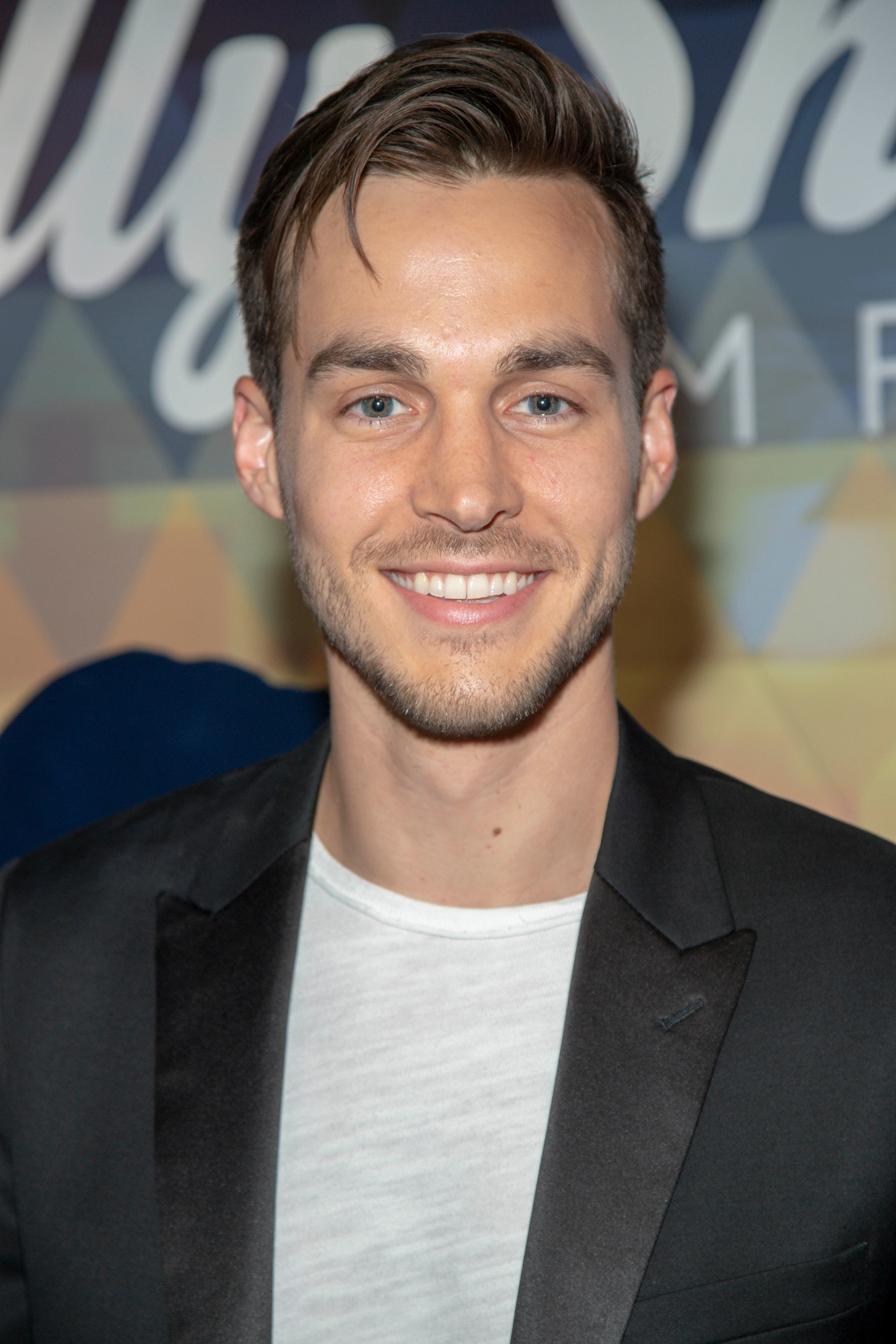
Chris Wood

- Jeffrey D. Sams (actor) (Cincinnati)
- Gary Sandy (actor) (Dayton)
- Sherri Saum (actor) (Dayton)
- Kim Seelbrede (Miss USA 1981) (Germantown)
- William Edwin Self (actor) (Dayton)
- Joe Seneca (actor) (Cleveland)
- Molly Shannon (comedian) (Shaker Heights/Cleveland)
- Martin Sheen (actor) (Dayton)
- Victor Slezak (actor) (Youngstown)
- Mamie Smith (singer, actress) (Cincinnati)
- Jimmy Snyder (oddsmaker, TV commentator, "Jimmy the Greek") (Steubenville)
- Rich Sommer (actor) (Toledo)
- Hal Sparks (actor) (Cincinnati)
- Ashley Spencer (actor) (Canton)
- Jerry Springer (television talk show host/former mayor of Cincinnati) (Cincinnati)
- Dina Spybey (actor) (Columbus)
- Brian Stepanek (actor) (Cleveland)
- Mark Stevens (actor) (Cleveland)
- Shannon Niquette Stewart (model) (Franklin)
- Alyson Stoner (actress/dancer) (Toledo)
- Philip Michael Thomas (actor) (Columbus)
- Andrea Thompson (model, broadcaster)
- Howard Thurston (magician/illusionist) (Columbus)
- Evelyn Venable (actress) (Cincinnati)
- Vera-Ellen (actress) (Norwood)
- Daniel von Bargen (actor) (Cincinnati)
- David Wain (comedian, actor) (Shaker Heights)
- Lucille Ward (actor) (Dayton)
- Ted Wass (actor) (Lakewood)
- Jerry Wasserman (actor) (Cincinnati)
- Jack Weston (actor) (Cleveland)
- Kym Whitley (actor) (Shaker Heights)
- Lee Wilkof (actor) (Canton)
- Fred Willard (actor) (Shaker Heights)
- Katt Williams (comedian, actor) (Dayton)
- De'Angelo Wilson (actor) (Dayton)
- Debra Winger (actor) (Cleveland Heights)
- Jonathan Winters (comedian, actor) (Dayton/Springfield)
- Ray Wise (actor) (Akron)
- Daniel Wisler (actor) (Fairfield)
- Chris Wood (actor) (Dublin)
- Scott Wozniak (YouTube personality)
- Amy Yasbeck (actor) (Cincinnati)
- Barrie Youngfellow (actor) (Cleveland)
- Chris Zylka (actor) (Howland township)

== Artists, painters, sculptors, photographers ==
- Diana Al-Hadid (sculptor) (Syria/Canton)
- Daniel Arsham (painter, sculptor) (Cleveland)
- William Jacob Baer (painter) (Cincinnati)
- George Bellows (painter) (Columbus)
- Charles E. Burchfield (painter) (Ashtabula Harbor)
- Joseph DeCamp (painter) (Cincinnati)
- Jim Dine (painter, sculptor) (Cincinnati)
- Natalia Fedner (fashion designer) (Bexley)
- Dan Friedman (graphic designer) (Cleveland)
- Carl Gaertner (painter) (Cleveland)
- Ann Hamilton (artist) (Lima)
- Mark Henn (animator) (Dayton)
- Robert Henri (painter) (Cincinnati)
- Jenny Holzer (conceptual artist) (Gallipolis)
- Vance Kirkland (painter) (Convoy)
- Joseph Kosuth (conceptual artist) (Toledo)
- Janet Cook Lewis (portrait painter) (Columbus)
- Maya Lin (sculptor) (Athens)
- John Lounsbery (animator) (Cincinnati)
- Curtis Lovell II (escape artist) (Columbus)
- Catherine Opie (photographer) (Sandusky)
- Ruthe Katherine Pearlman (artist, educator) (Cincinnati)
- Robert E. L. Rainey (artist) (North Canton)
- Justin Roberts (painter)
- Aminah Robinson (artist) (Columbus)
- Herb Roe (painter) (Portsmouth)
- Alice Schille (painter) (Columbus)
- Fred Schrier (comic book artist) (Kirtland)
- Dave Sheridan (comic book artist) (Cleveland)
- Lily Martin Spencer (painter) (Avondale/Marietta)
- Tom Tsuchiya (sculptor) (Cincinnati)
- John Henry Twachtman (painter) (Cincinnati)
- Daryl Urig (illustrator, painter) (Harrison)
- Tom Wesselmann (pop artist) (Cincinnati)
- Clarence White (photographer) (West Carlisle/Newark)
- Worthington Whittredge (painter) (Springfield)
- Dare Wright (photographer, children's author) (Cleveland)

== Sportspeople ==
A–B

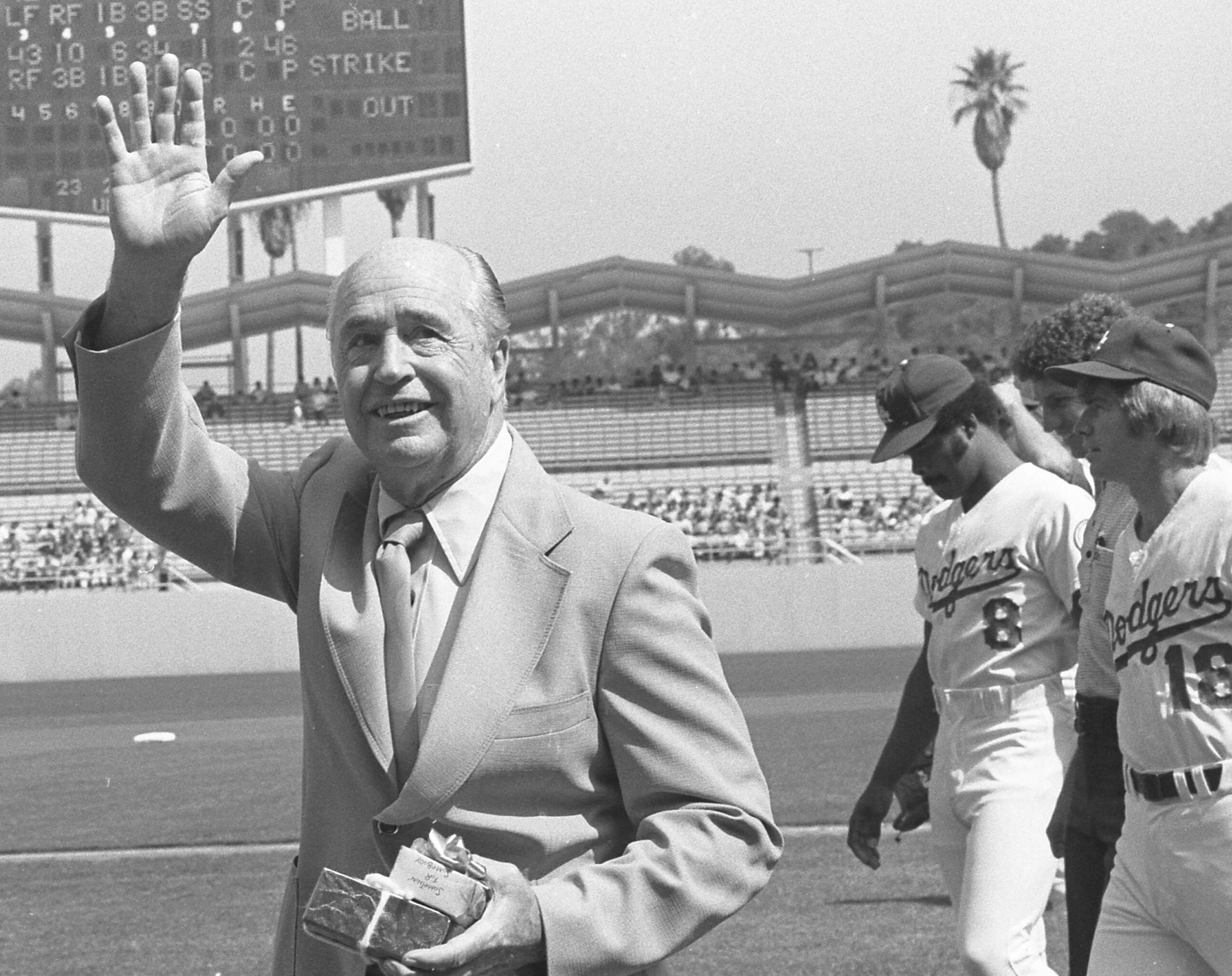
Walter Alston

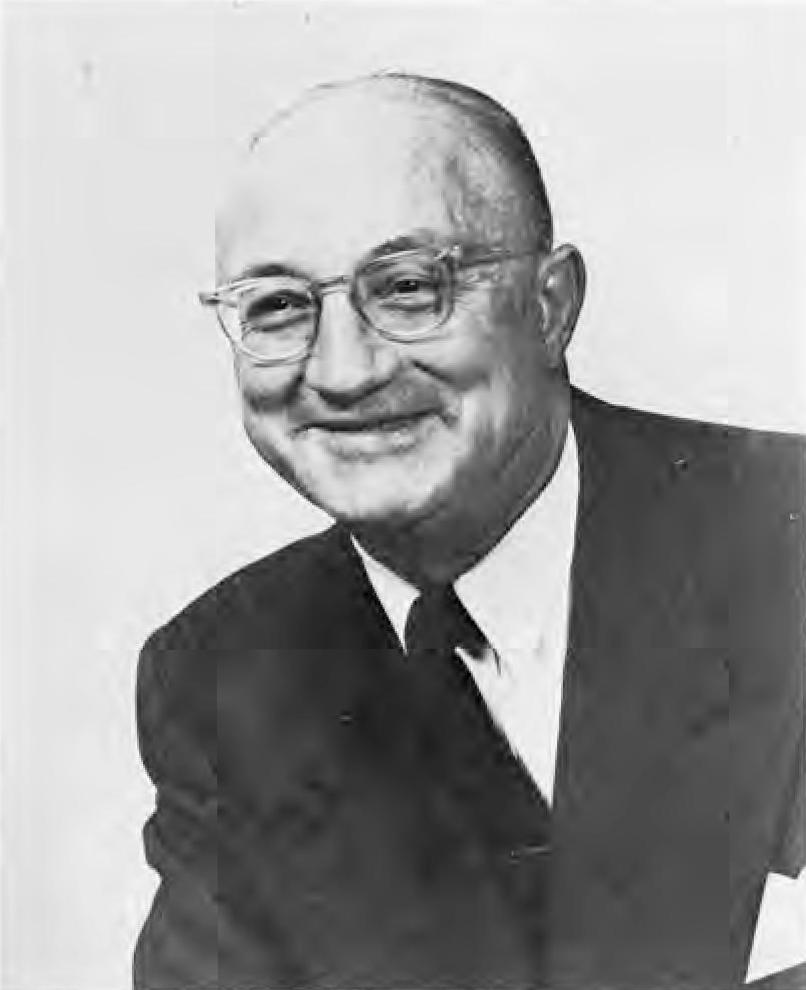
Harold Anderson

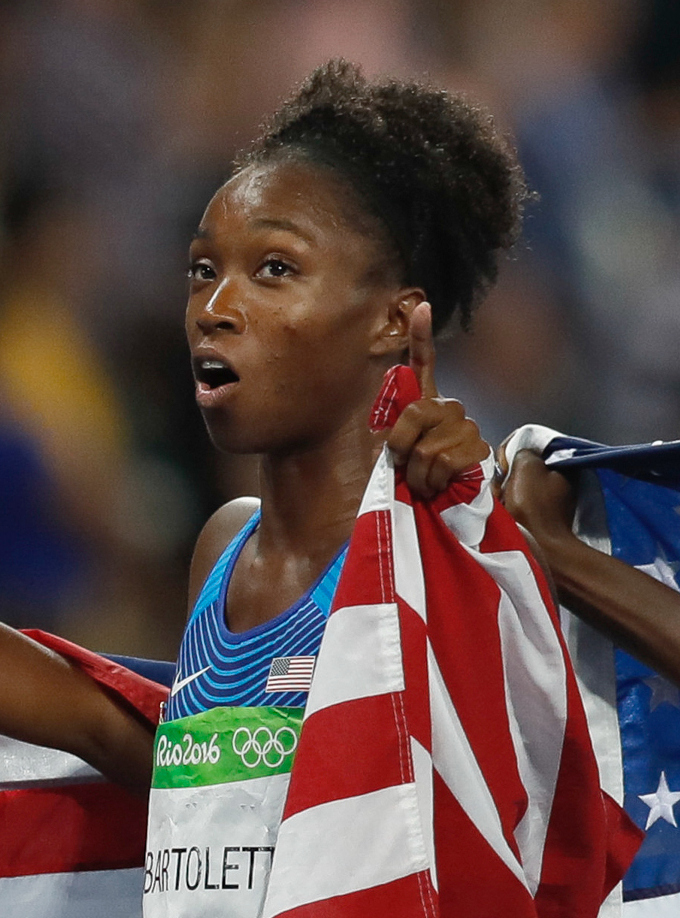
Tianna Bartoletta

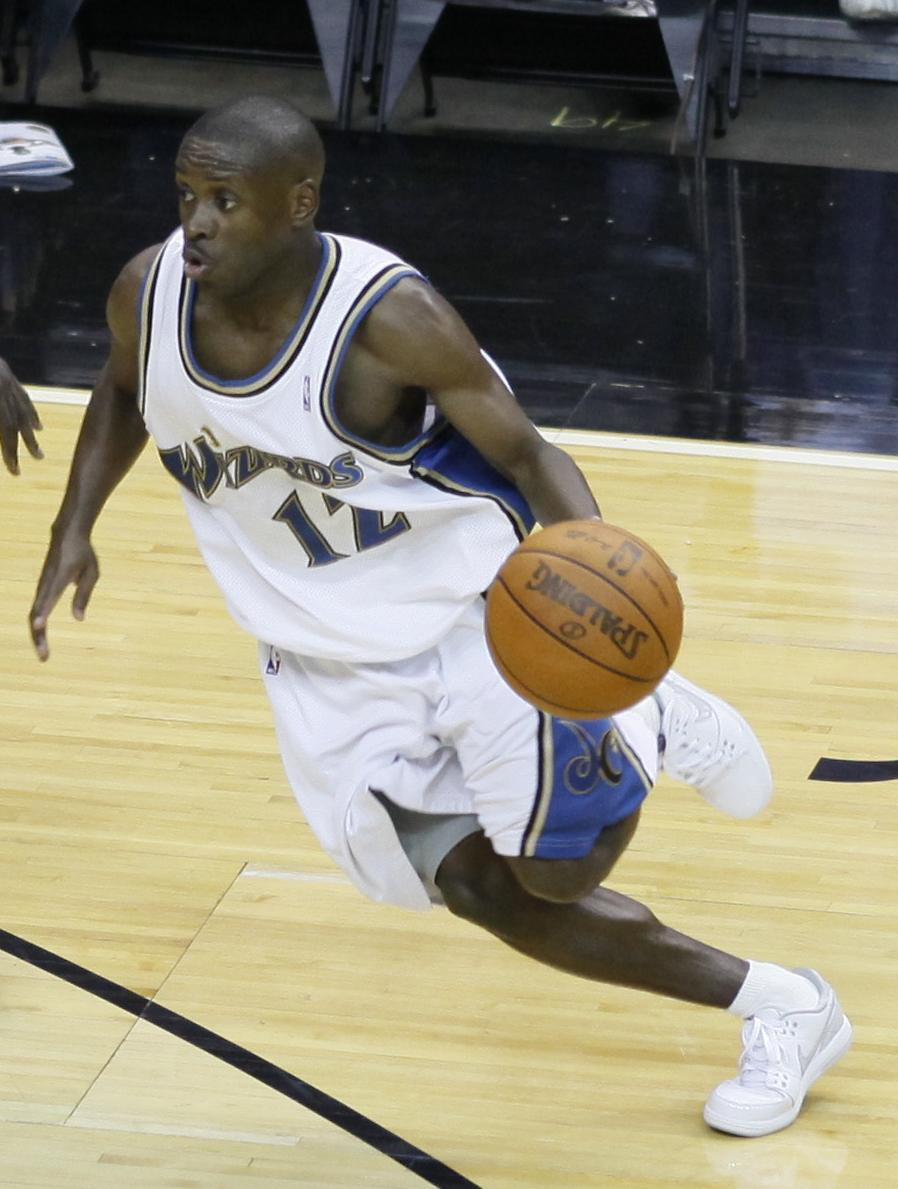
Earl Boykins

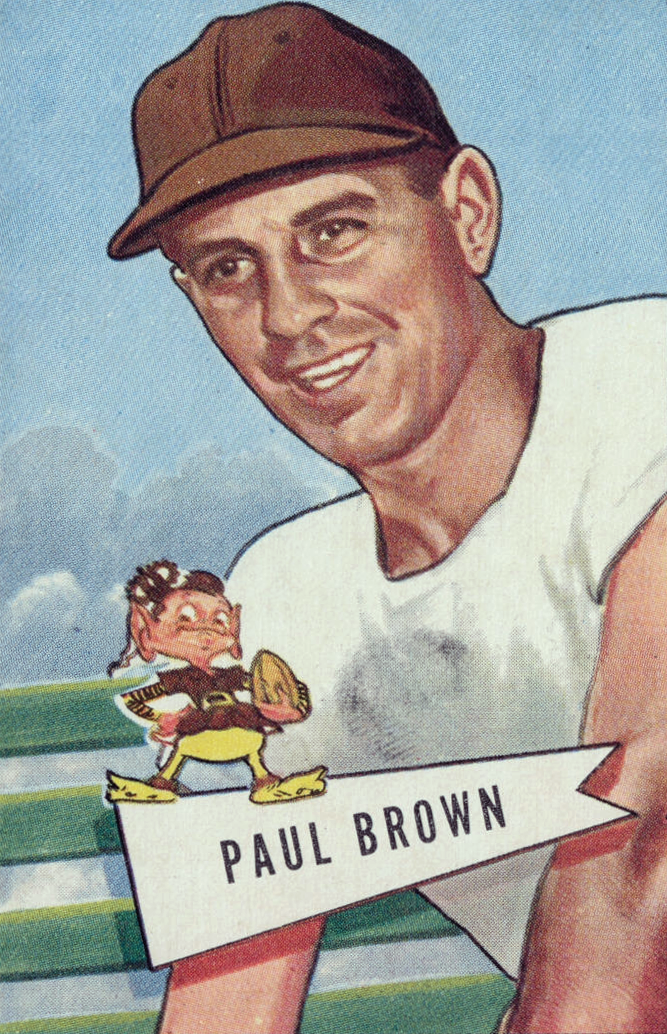
Paul Brown

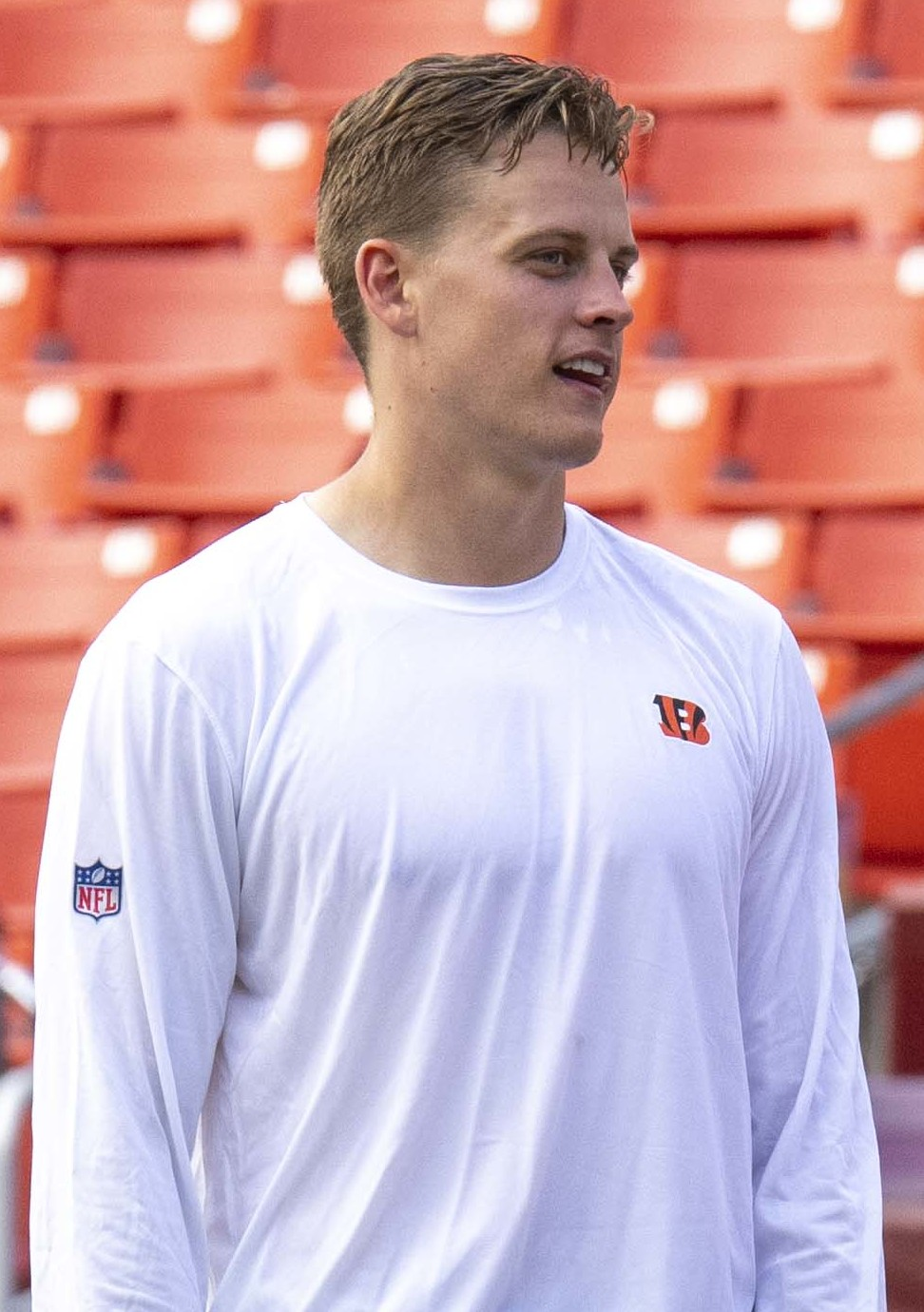
Joe Burrow

- Dan Abbott (baseball player) (Portage County)
- Fred Abbott (baseball player) (Versailles)
- Kurt Abbott (baseball player) (Zanesville)
- A. J. Achter (baseball player) (Toledo)
- Chet Adams (football player) (Cleveland)
- Alex Albright (football player) (Cincinnati)
- Glenn Allen Jr. (racing driver) (Cincinnati)
- Will Allen (football player) (Dayton)
- Walter Alston (baseball manager) (Venice)
- Nick Altrock (baseball player) (Cincinnati)
- Red Ames (baseball player) (Warren)
- Allan Anderson (baseball player) (Lancaster)
- Dick J. Anderson (football player) (Massillon)
- Harold Anderson (basketball coach) (Akron)
- Blake Annen (football player) (Upper Arlington)
- Gordon Appleby (football player) (Massillon)
- Eddie Arcaro (jockey) (Cincinnati)
- Art Arfons (land speed record tester) (Akron)
- Bob Armstrong (boxer) (Washington)
- Earl Averill Jr. (baseball player) (Cleveland)
- Randy Ayers (basketball coach) (Springfield)
- Luke Babbitt (basketball player) (Cincinnati)
- Coy Bacon (football player) (Ironton)
- Jim Bagby Jr. (baseball player) (Cleveland)
- Doug Bair (baseball player) (Defiance)
- Doc Baker (football player) (Akron)
- Jake Ballard (football player) (Springboro)
- Chris Bando (baseball player) (Solon)
- Sal Bando (baseball player) (Cleveland)
- Mike Barnett (baseball coach) (Columbus)
- Tianna Bartoletta (track athlete) (Elyria)
- Chris Bassitt (baseball player) (Toledo)
- Johnny Bates (baseball player) (Steubenville)
- Cliff Battles (Hall of Fame football player, coach) (Akron)
- Frank Baumholtz (baseball player, basketball player) (Midvale)
- Alex Bayer (football player) (Pickerington)
- Tim Belcher (baseball player) (Mount Gilead)
- David Bell (baseball manager and player) (Cincinnati)
- Le'Veon Bell (football player) (Reynoldsburg)
- Clarence Belt (racing driver) (Xenia)
- Mike Benjamin (baseball player) (Euclid)
- LeCharles Bentley (football player) (Cleveland)
- Bruce Berenyi (baseball player) (Bryan)
- Cliff Bergere (racing driver) (Toledo)
- Bob Bescher (baseball player) (London)
- Pauline Betz (tennis player) (Dayton)
- Simone Biles (gymnast) (Columbus)
- Chad Billingsley (baseball player) (Defiance)
- Mike Birkbeck (baseball player) (Orrville)
- Chase Blackburn (football player) (Marysville)
- Todd Blackledge (football player, sportscaster) (North Canton)
- Dale Blaney (race car driver) (Hartford)
- Dave Blaney (race car driver) (Hartford)
- Lou Blaney (race car driver) (Hartford)
- Ryan Blaney (race car driver) (Cortland)
- Jerry Blevins (baseball player) (Arcadia)
- Brock Bolen (football player) (Germantown)
- Barry Bonnell (baseball player, basketball player) (Mariemont)
- Alex Boone (football player) (Lakewood)
- Bud Boone (racing driver) (Warren)
- Pat Borders (baseball player) (Columbus)
- Justin Boren (football player) (Pickerington)
- Chris Borland (football player) (Kettering)
- "Tough" Tony Borne (professional wrestler) (Columbus)
- Stan Boroski (baseball coach) (Martins Ferry)
- Daryl Boston (baseball player) (Cincinnati)
- Jack Bowsher (racing driver) (Harmony)
- Earl Boykins (basketball player) (Cleveland)
- Jack Boyle (baseball player) (Cincinnati)
- Andrew Brackman (baseball player) (Cincinnati)
- Bill Bradley (baseball player and manager) (Cleveland)
- Bob Brenly (baseball player, manager) (Coshocton)
- Roger Bresnahan (baseball player) (Toledo)
- Robert Brewster (football player) (Cincinnati)
- Diyral Briggs (football player) (Mount Healthy)
- Aris Brimanis (hockey player) (Cleveland)
- Ed Brinkman (baseball player) (Cincinnati)
- Adrien Broner (boxer) (Cincinnati)
- Jim Brosnan (baseball player, writer) (Cincinnati)
- Gates Brown (baseball player) (Crestline)
- Matt Brown (UFC fighter) (Xenia)
- Mike Brown (basketball coach) (Columbus)
- Mike Brown (football executive, owner) (Massillon)
- Paul Brown (HOF football coach, team owner and executive) (Norwalk)
- Preston Brown (football player) (Cincinnati)
- Ray Brown (baseball player) (Alger)
- Bill Brubaker (baseball player) (Cleveland)
- Bob Brudzinski (football player) (Fremont)
- Carl Brumbaugh (football player) (West Milton)
- Phil H. Bucklew (football player) (Columbus)
- Jarrod Bunch (football player) (Ashtabula)
- Dave Burba (baseball player) (Springfield)
- Ellis Burks (baseball player) (Chagrin Falls)
- George Burns (baseball player) (Niles)
- Joe Burrow (football player) (Athens)
- Jake Butt (football player) (Pickerington)

C–D

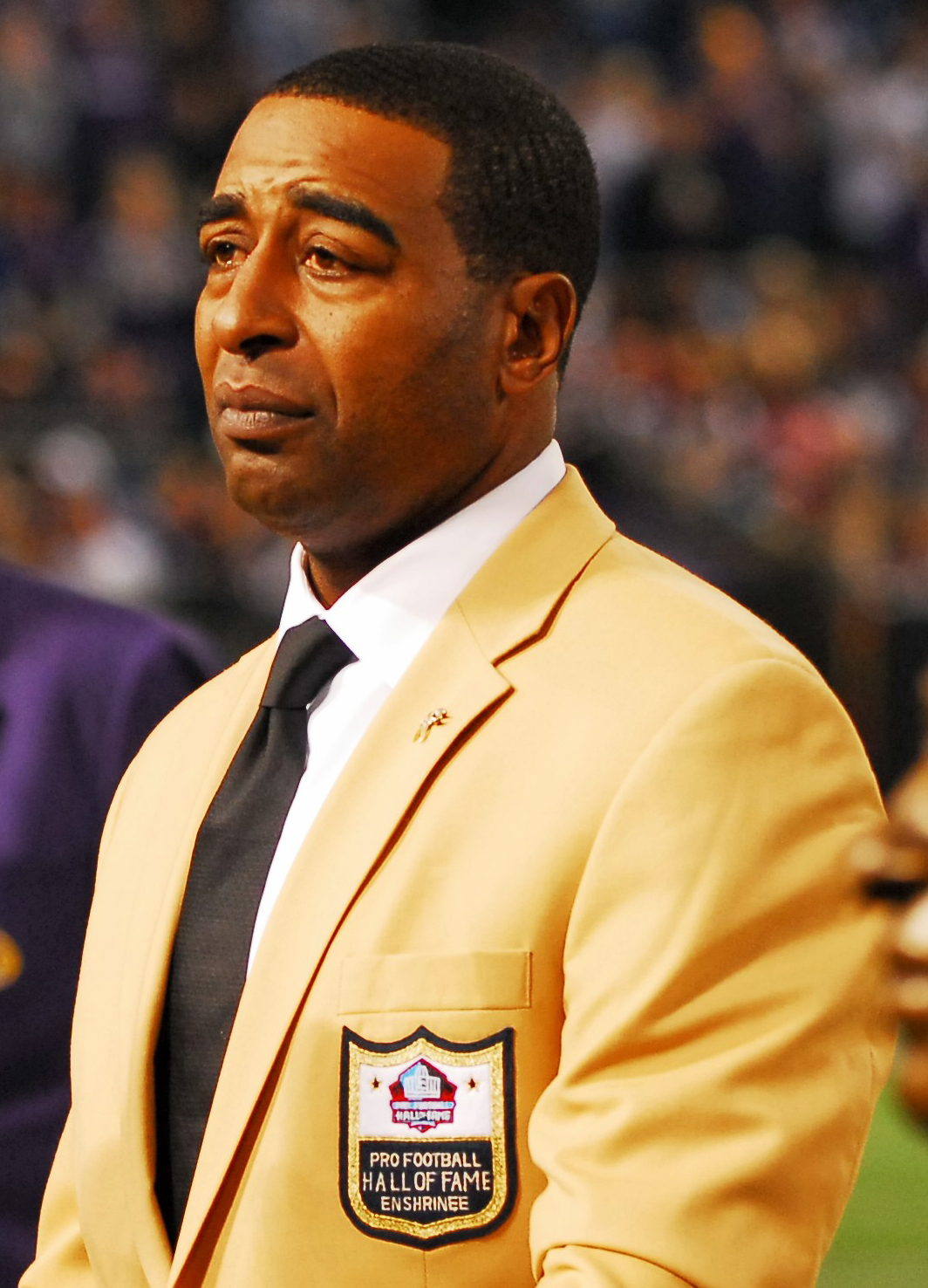
Cris Carter

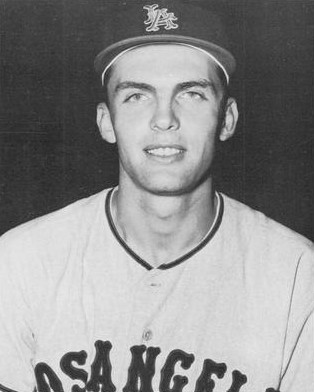
Dean Chance

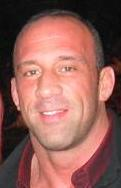
Mark Coleman

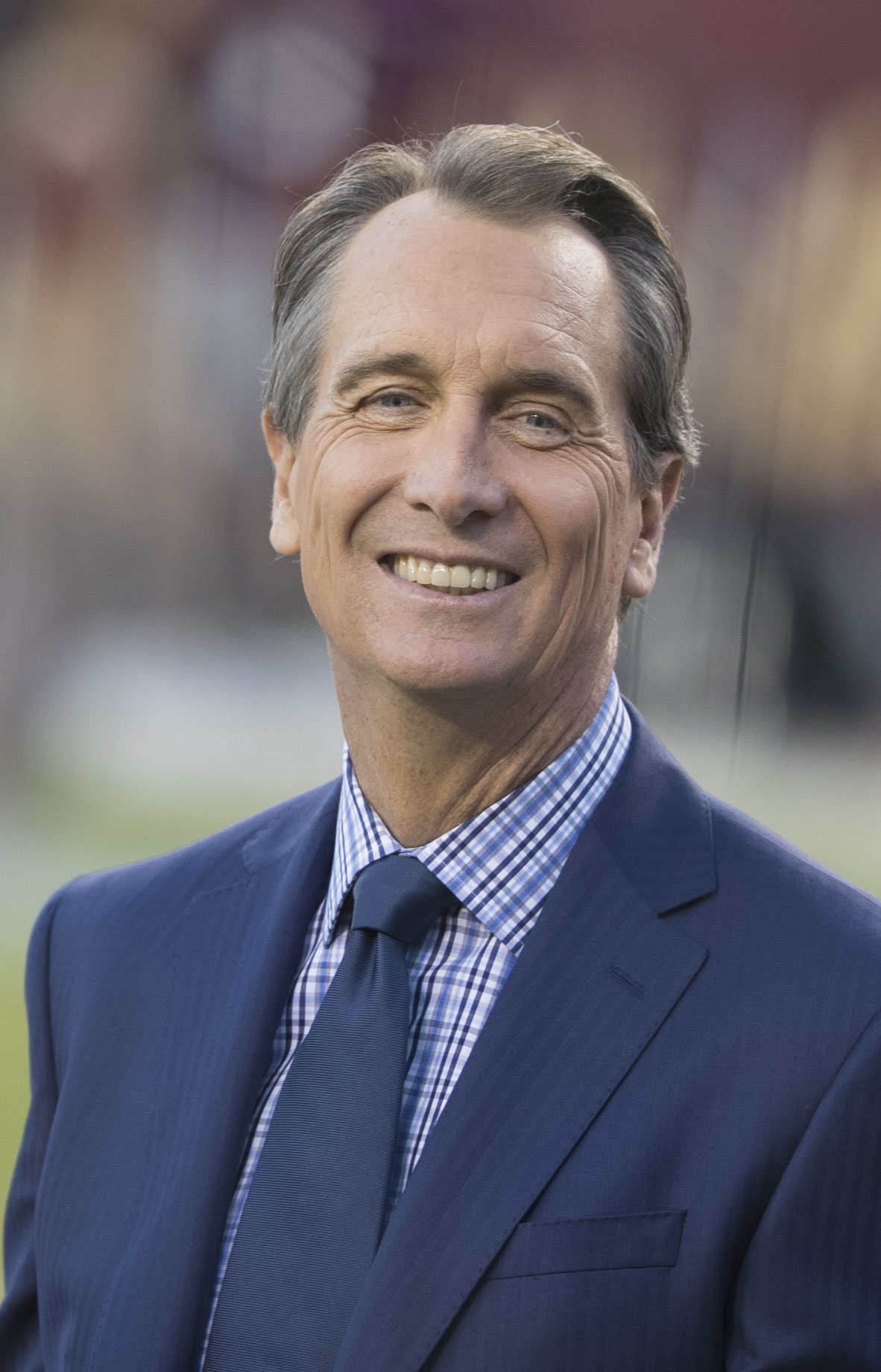
Cris Collinsworth

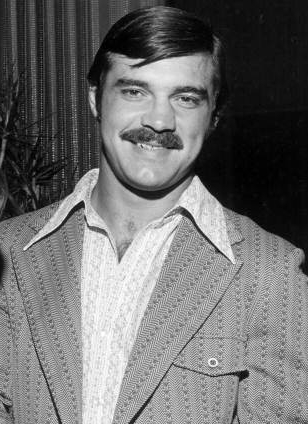
Larry Csonka

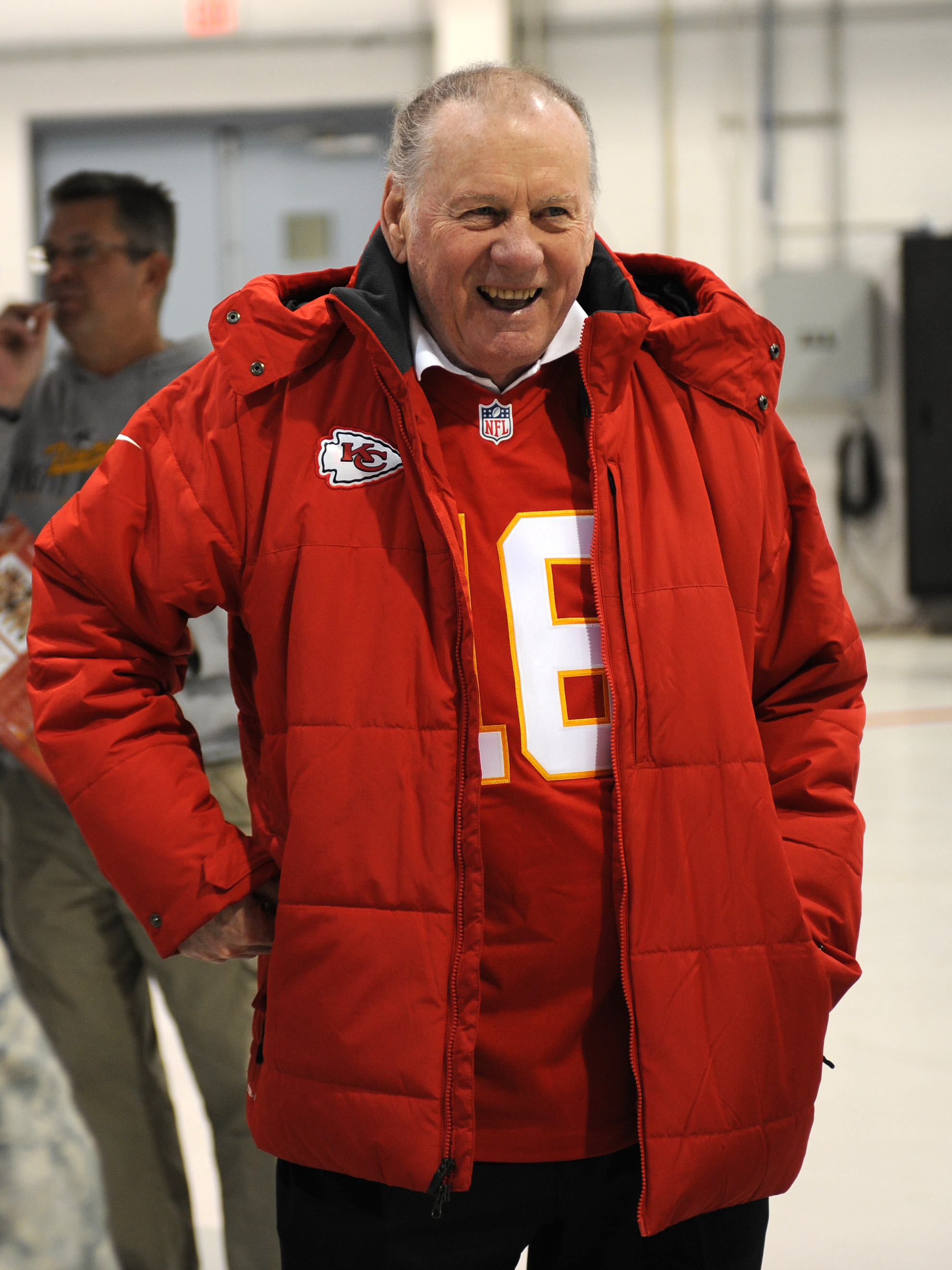
Len Dawson

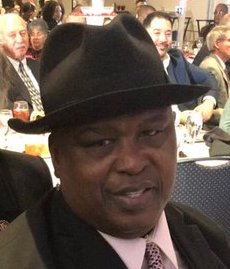
Buster Douglas

- Matt Campbell (football coach) (Massillon)
- Carter Camper (hockey player) (Rocky River)
- Dom Capers (football coach) (Cambridge)
- Matthew Capiccioni (professional wrestler) (Brecksville)
- George Cappuzzello (baseball player) (Youngstown)
- Steve Cargile (football player) (Cleveland)
- Bobby Carpenter (football player) (Lancaster)
- Rob Carpenter (football player) (Junction City)
- Austin Carr (basketball player) (Cleveland)
- Joseph Carr (NFL president) (Columbus)
- Tank Carradine (football player) (Cincinnati)
- Butch Carter (basketball player, coach) (Middletown)
- Cris Carter (football player) (Middletown)
- Drew Carter (football player) (Solon)
- Howard Cassady (football player) (Columbus)
- Matt Cavanaugh (football player) (Youngstown)
- Brent Celek (football player) (Cincinnati)
- Andrew Chafin (baseball player) (Wakeman)
- Chris Chambers (football player) (Cleveland)
- Chris Chambliss (baseball player, coach) (Dayton)
- Dean Chance (baseball player) (Wooster)
- Ezzard Charles (boxer) (Cincinnati)
- Taco Charlton (football player) (Pickerington)
- Kwan Cheatham (basketball player) (Cincinnati)
- Semaj Christon (basketball player) (Cincinnati)
- Galen Cisco (baseball player and coach) (St. Marys)
- Maurice Clarett (football player) (Warren)
- Zion Clark (MMA fighter, wrestler) (Columbus)
- Roger Clemens (baseball player) (Dayton)
- Nate Clements (football player) (Shaker Heights)
- Billy Clingman (baseball player) (Cincinnati)
- Barry Cofield (football player) (Cleveland Heights)
- Norris Cole (basketball player) (Dayton)
- Trent Cole (football player) (Xenia)
- Davon Coleman (football player) (Cleveland)
- Kurt Coleman (football player) (Clayton)
- Marco Coleman (football player) (Dayton)
- Mark Coleman (Olympic freestyle wrestler, MMA fighter) (Fremont)
- Jason Collier (basketball player) (Springfield)
- Cris Collinsworth (football player, sportscaster) (Dayton)
- Gareon Conley (football player) (Massillon)
- John Conner (football player) (Cincinnati)
- Billy Consolo (baseball player and coach) (Cleveland)
- Daequan Cook (basketball player) (Dayton)
- Jim Cordle (football player) (Lancaster)
- Larry Cox (baseball player) (Bluffton)
- Shawn Crable (football player) (Massillon)
- Estel Crabtree (baseball player) (Crabtree)
- Tom Crabtree (football player) (Columbus)
- Sylvia Crawley (basketball player/coach) (Steubenville)
- Beth Crist (professional wrestler) (Dayton)
- Mark Croghan (track and field Olympian) (Green)
- Larry Csonka (Hall of Fame football player) (Stow)
- Jeff Cumberland (football player) (Youngstown)
- Stephen Curry (basketball player) (Akron)
- Scott Cursi (baseball coach) (Columbus)
- Ben Curtis (golf player) (Columbus)
- Jack Cusack (football coach and general manager) (Canton)
- Ed Cushman (baseball player) (Eagleville)
- Alissa Czisny (figure skater) (Bowling Green)
- Mark Dantonio (football coach) (Zanesville)
- Thom Darden (football player) (Sandusky)
- Helen Darling (WNBA player) (Columbus)
- Doug Dascenzo (baseball player and coach) (Cleveland)
- Fred Davis (football player) (Toledo)
- Nate Davis (football player) (Bellaire)
- Len Dawson (football player) (Alliance)
- Ed Delahanty (baseball player) (Cleveland)
- Frank Delahanty (baseball player) (Cleveland)
- Jim Delahanty (baseball player) (Cleveland)
- Josh Devore (baseball player) (Murray City)
- Jon Diebler (basketball player) (Sylvania)
- Kris Dielman (football player) (Troy)
- Dan Dierdorf (Hall of Fame football player, sportscaster) (Canton)
- Derek Dietrich (baseball player) (Cleveland)
- Cecil Dillon (hockey player) (Toledo)
- Dillon Dingler (baseball player) (Massillon)
- Michael Dokes (boxer) (Akron)
- Jiggs Donahue (baseball player) (Springfield)
- Andrew Donnal (football player) (Monclova)
- Red Dooin (baseball player and manager) (Cincinnati)
- Bill Doran (baseball player) (Cincinnati)
- Andy Dorris (football player) (Bellaire)
- Richard Dotson (baseball player) (Cincinnati)
- Bobby Douglas (Olympic freestyle wrestler and coach) (Bridgeport)
- Hugh Douglas (football player) (Mansfield)
- James "Buster" Douglas (boxer) (Columbus)
- Bob Dove (lineman, College Football Hall of Fame) (Youngstown)
- Dick Drago (baseball player) (Toledo)
- Dave Dravecky (baseball player) (Youngstown)
- Dick Drott (baseball player) (Cincinnati)
- Pat Duncan (baseball player) (Coalton)
- Leon Durham (baseball player) (Cincinnati)
- Duffy Dyer (baseball player) (Dayton)
- Rob Dyrdek (skateboarder) (Kettering)

E–G

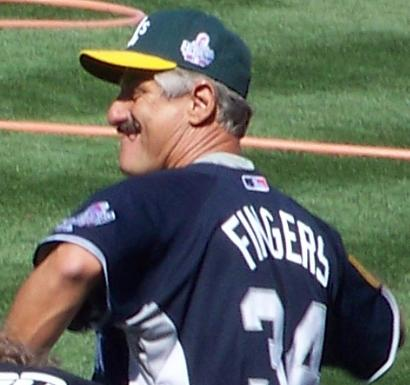
Rollie Fingers

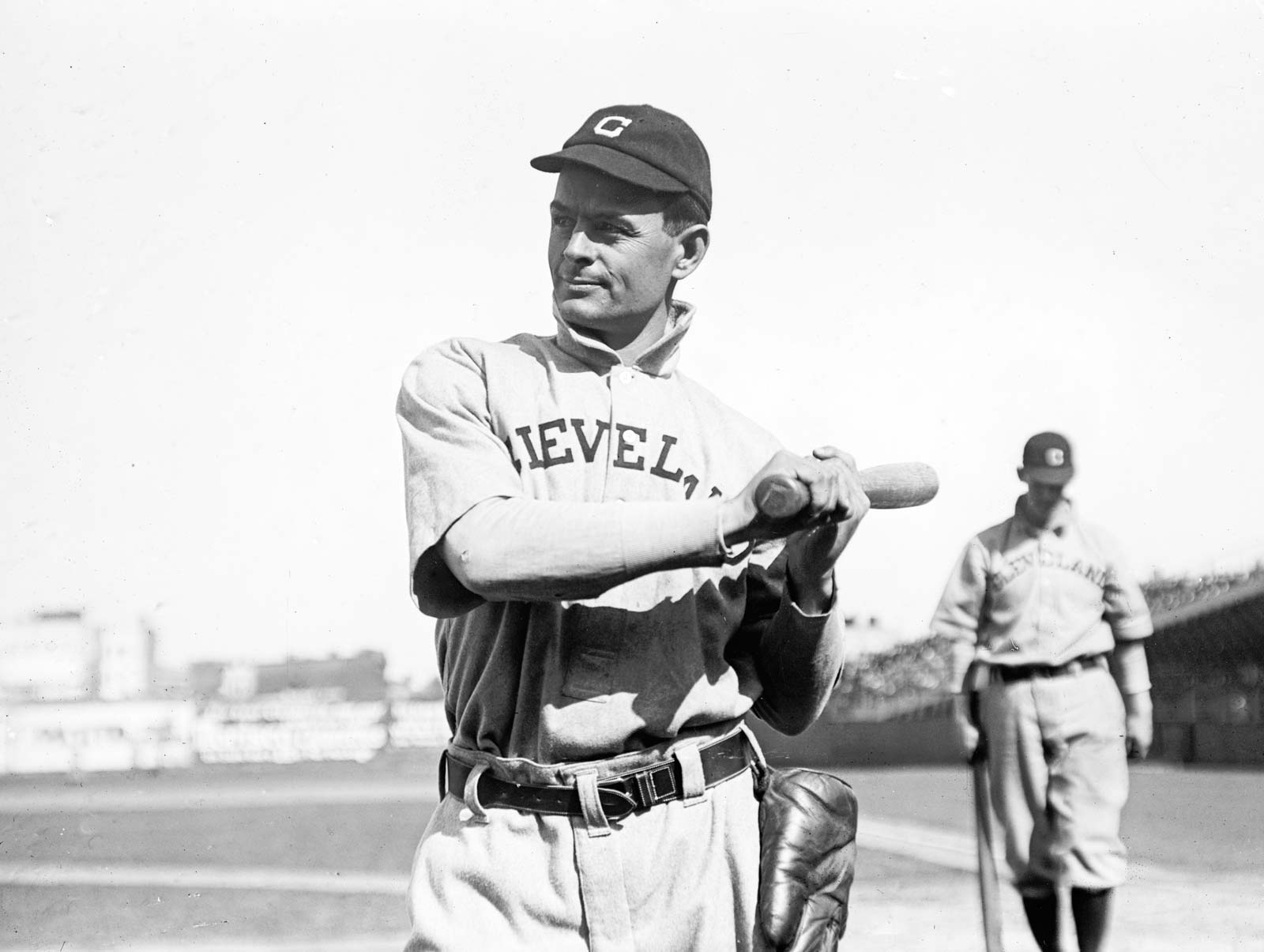
Elmer Flick

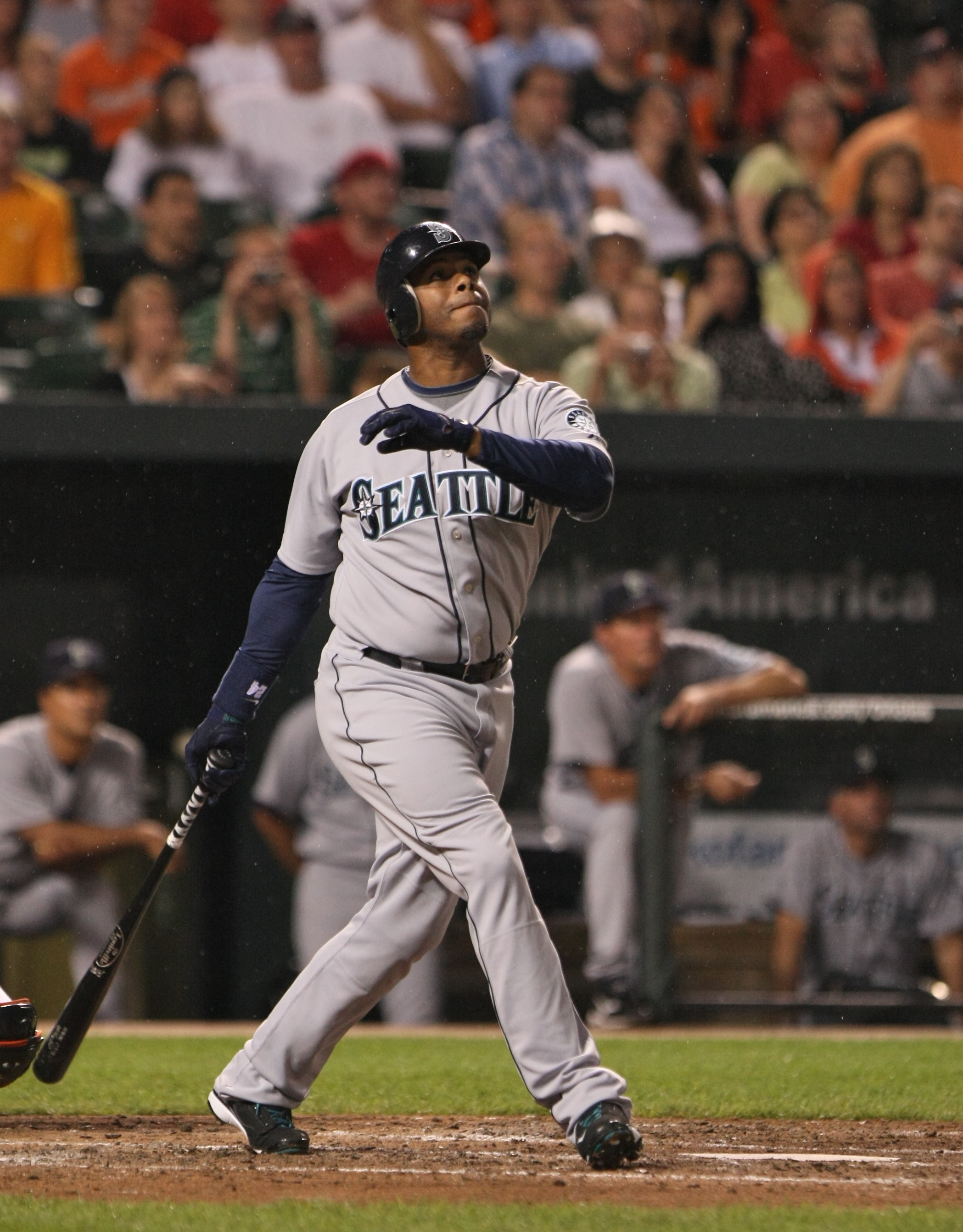
Ken Griffey Jr.

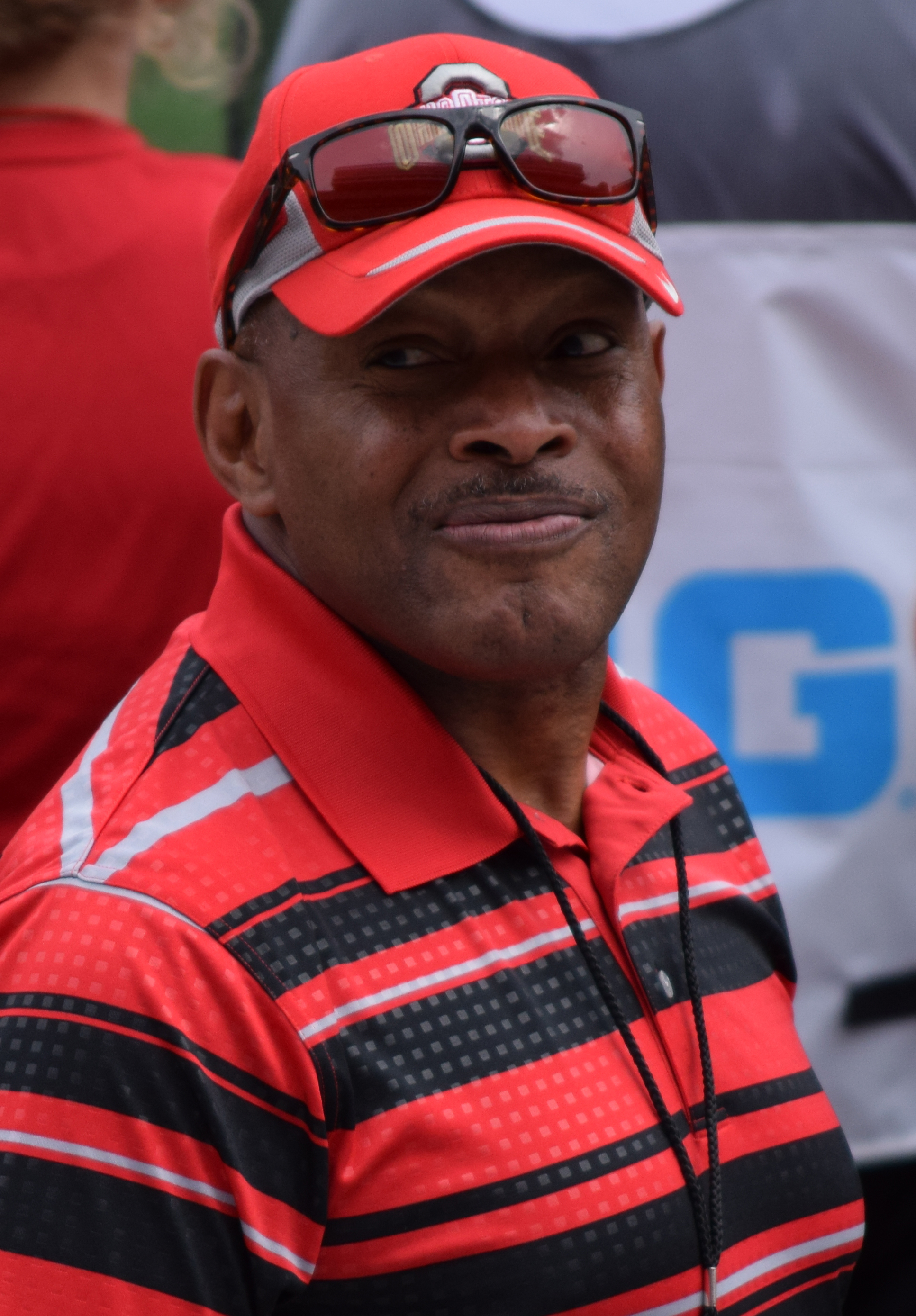
Archie Griffin

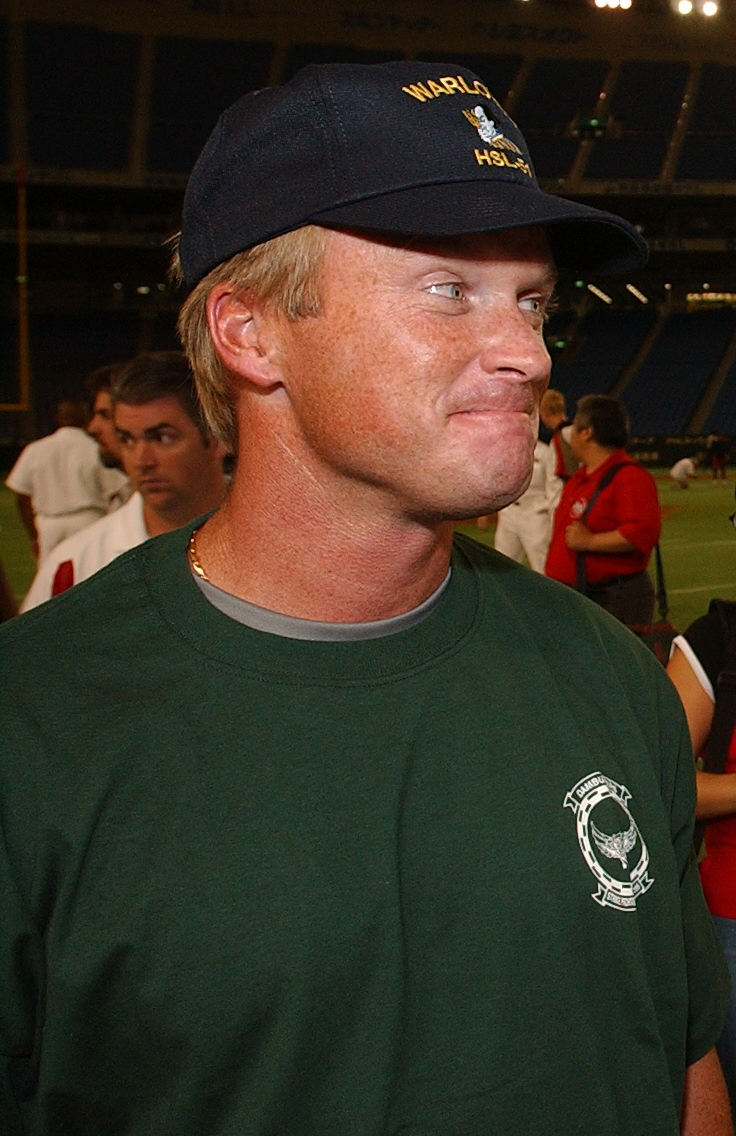
Jon Gruden

- Adam Eaton (baseball player) (Springfield)
- Nate Ebner (football player and rugby Olympian) (Dublin)
- Bill Edwards (football player and coach) (Massillon)
- Marc Edwards (football player) (Norwood)
- Ray Edwards (football player) (Cincinnati)
- Ron Edwards (football player) (Columbus)
- Scott Effross (baseball pitcher) (Twinsburg)
- Jacob Eisner (basketball player) (Cincinnati)
- Pat Elflein (football player) (Pickerington)
- Nat Emerson (tennis player) (Cincinnati)
- Evan Eschmeyer (basketball player) (New Knoxville)
- Billy Evans (Baseball Hall of Fame umpire) (Youngstown)
- Lee Evans (football player) (Sandusky)
- Buck Ewing (baseball player) (Hoagland)
- James Farragher (football player, coach) (Youngstown)
- Bruce Fields (baseball player, coach) (Cleveland)
- Chris Finch (basketball coach) (Cambridge)
- Rollie Fingers (baseball player) (Steubenville)
- Sarah Fisher (race car driver) (Columbus)
- Bradley Fletcher (football player) (Youngstown)
- London Fletcher (football player) (Cleveland)
- Elmer Flick (Baseball Hall of Famer) (Bedford)
- Charles Follis (football player) (Wooster)
- Wayne Fontes (football coach) (Canton)
- Matt Fox (baseball player) (Columbus)
- Dennis Franklin (football player) (Massillon)
- Rich Franklin (UFC champion) (Middletown)
- Mike Fratello (basketball coach) (Bratenahl)
- Brad Friedel (soccer goalkeeper) (Lakewood)
- Benny Friedman (1905–1982) (Hall of Fame NFL quarterback) (Cleveland)
- Ross Friedman (Major League Soccer player) (Columbus)
- Charlie Frye (football player) (Willard)
- Eric Fryer (baseball player) (Columbus)
- Mike Furrey (football player) (Grove City)
- Joey Galloway (football player) (Bellaire)
- Johnny Gargano (professional wrestler) (Cleveland)
- Jason Garrett (football player) (Hunting Valley)
- Brian Gassaway (mixed martial artist) (Urbana)
- Jackie Gayda (professional wrestler) (Strongsville)
- Ben Gedeon (football player) (Hudson)
- Shelton Gibson (football player) (Cleveland Heights)
- Ted Ginn Jr. (football player) (Cleveland)
- Terry Glenn (football player) (Columbus)
- Brad Goldberg (baseball pitcher) (Cleveland)
- Bob Golic (football player, actor) (Cleveland)
- Mike Golic (football player, radio personality) (Cleveland)
- Anthony Gonzalez (football player and politician) (Cleveland)
- Jonathan Good (professional wrestler) (Cincinnati)
- Najee Goode (football player) (Cleveland)
- Jack Goodrich (football manager and player) (Massillon)
- Randy Gradishar (Hall of Fame football player) (Warren)
- Bobby Grier (football player) (Massillon)
- Ken Griffey Jr. (baseball player) (Cincinnati)
- Archie Griffin (football player) (Columbus)
- Forrest Griffin (Hall of Fame mixed martial artist) (Columbus)
- Lou Groza (football player) (Martins Ferry)
- Jon Gruden (football coach) (Sandusky)
- Matt Guerrier (baseball player) (Cleveland)

H–I

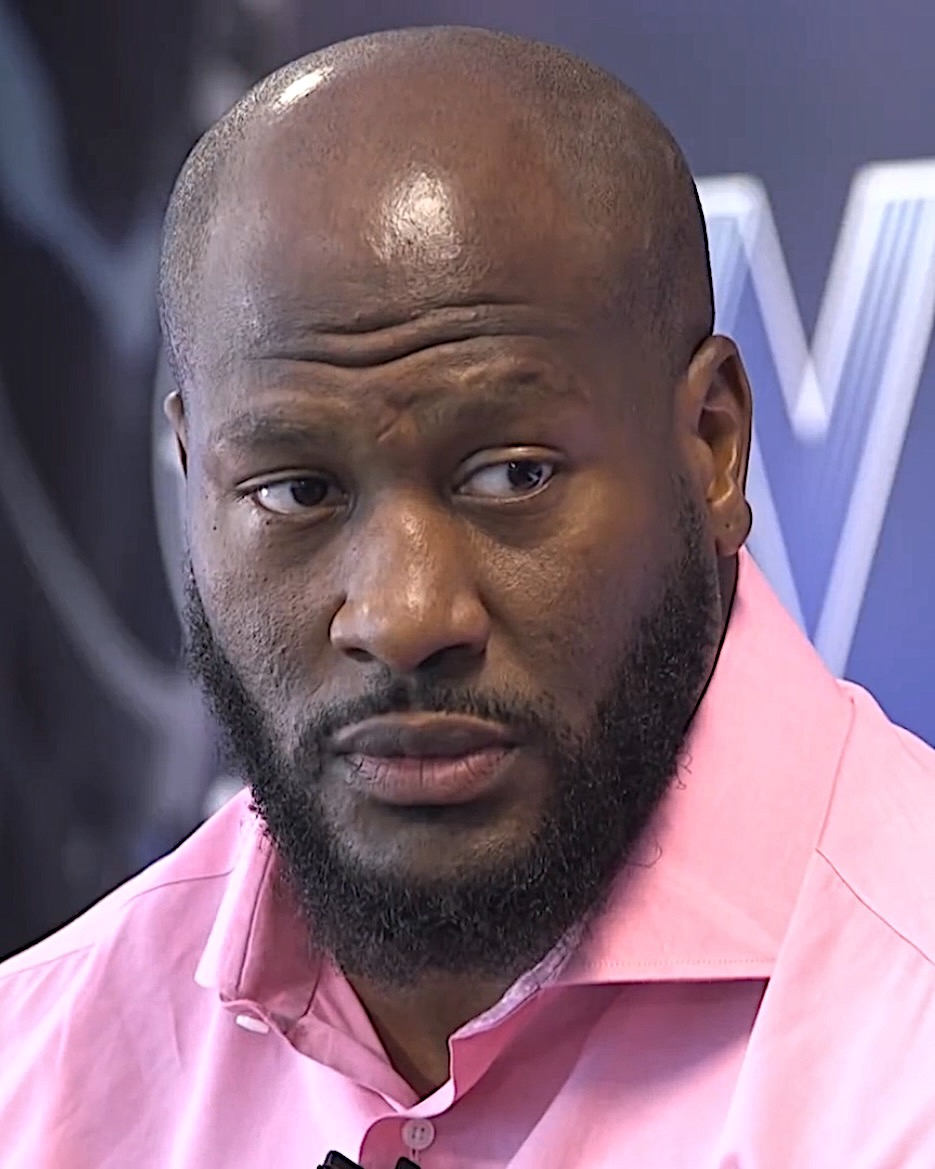
James Harrison

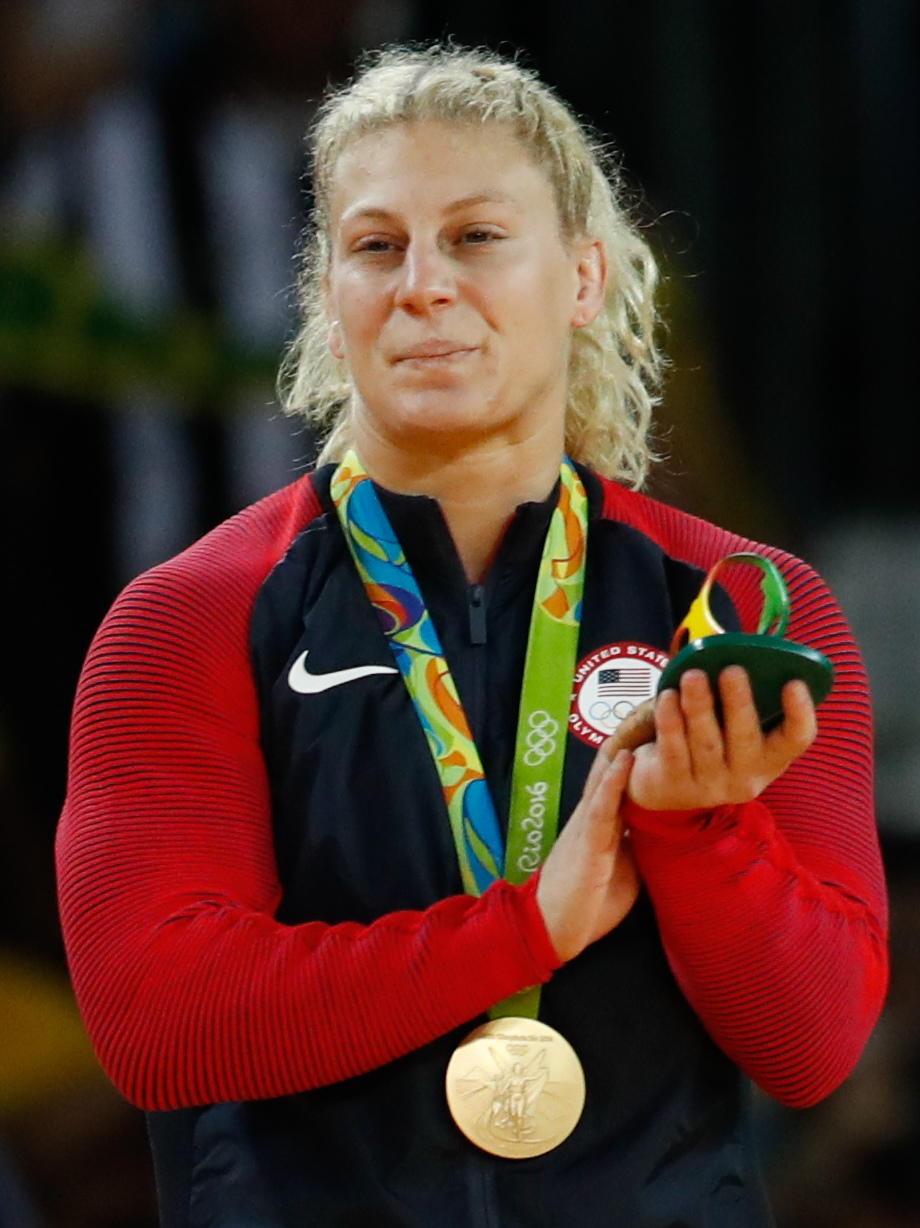
Kayla Harrison

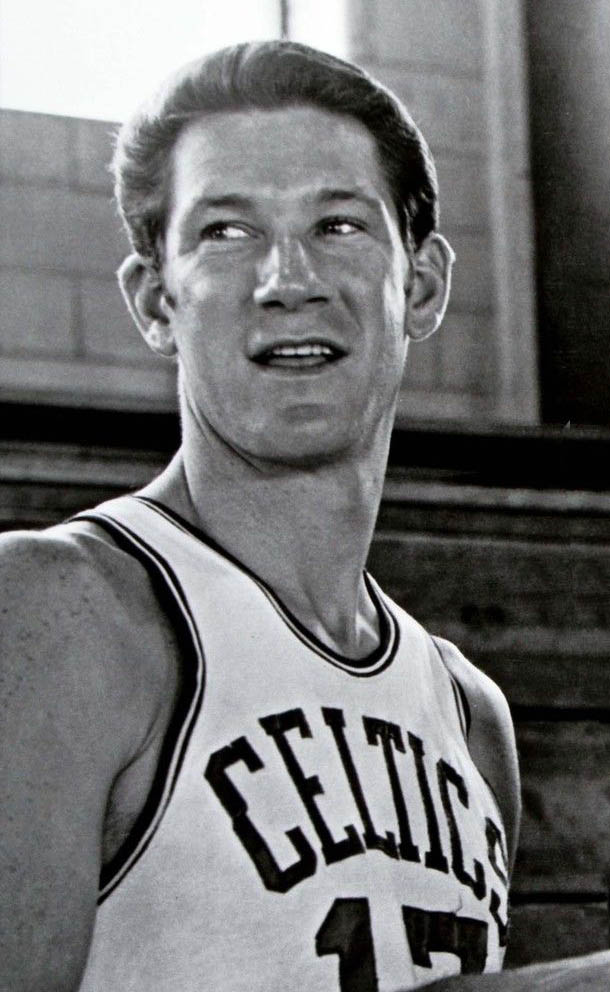
John Havlicek

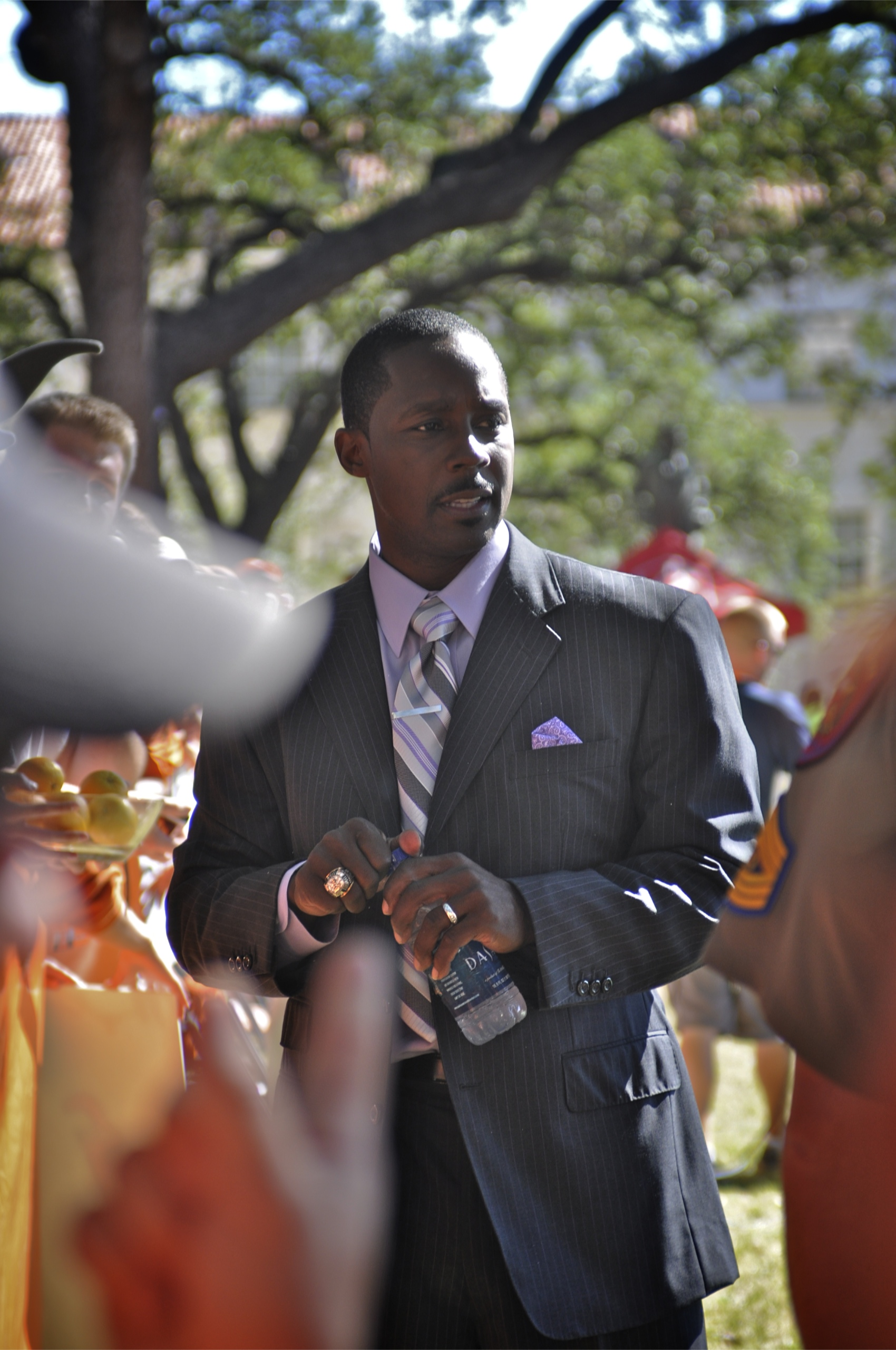
Desmond Howard

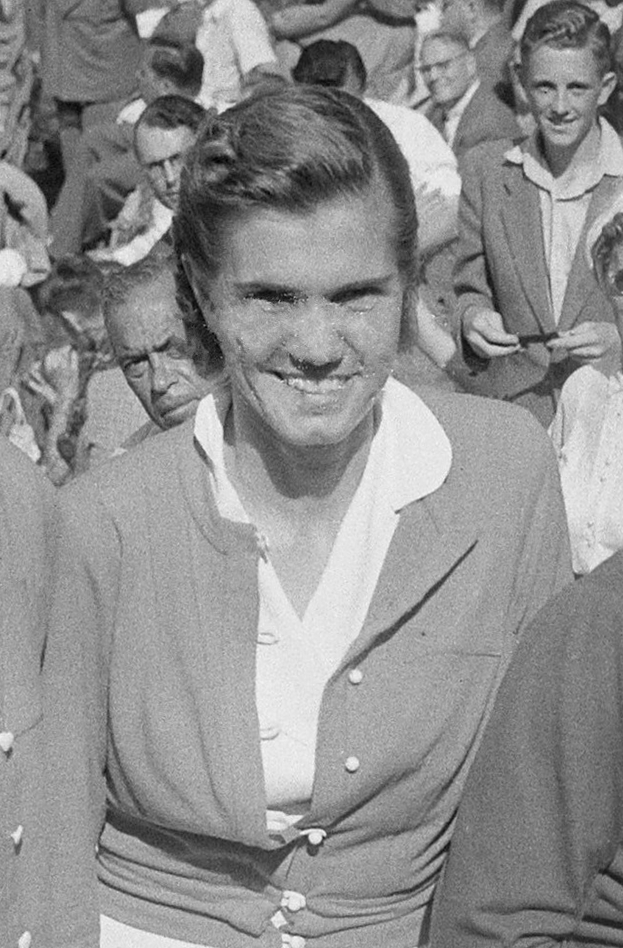
Shirley Fry Irvin

- Harvey Haddix (baseball Player) (Medway)
- Roy Hall (football player) (South Euclid)
- Andrew Hampsten (cyclist) (Columbus)
- James Hanna (football player) (Lakewood)
- Tommy Hannon (football player) (Massillon)
- Jim Harbaugh (football player) (Toledo)
- Justin Hardee (football player) (Cleveland)
- Brett Harkins (hockey player) (North Ridgeville)
- Todd Harkins (hockey player) (Cleveland)
- Ron Harper (basketball player) (Dayton)
- James Harrison (football player) (Akron)
- Josh Harrison (baseball player) (Cincinnati)
- Kayla Harrison (MMA fighter and judoka) (Middletown)
- Peter Harrold (hockey player) (Kirtland Hills)
- Kevin Hartman (soccer player) (Athens)
- Ben Hartsock (football player) (Chillicothe)
- Don Hasselbeck (football player) (Cincinnati)
- Mickey Hatcher (baseball player, coach) (Cleveland)
- John Havlicek (basketball player) (Martins Ferry)
- A. J. Hawk (football player) (Centerville)
- Wynn Hawkins (baseball player) (Youngstown)
- Woody Hayes (football coach) (Clifton)
- Dirk Hayhurst (baseball player) (Canton)
- John Heisman (football, baseball and basketball player and coach) (Cleveland)
- Carol Heiss Jenkins (figure skating, acting) (Lakewood)
- Gus Henderson (football and basketball coach) (Oberlin)
- Tommy Henrich (baseball player) (Massillon)
- Kim Herring (football player) (Solon)
- Dan Herron (football player) (Warren)
- Mike Hershberger (baseball player) (Massillon)
- Fred Heyman (football player) (Massillon)
- Jordan Hicks (football player) (West Chester)
- Tyrone Hill (basketball player, coach) (Cincinnati)
- Pat Hintz (basketball player) (Massillon)
- Larry Hisle (baseball player) (Portsmouth)
- Anthony Hitchens (football player) (Lorain)
- Domenik Hixon (football player) (Whitehall)
- Robert Hoernschemeyer (football player) (Cincinnati)
- Marty Hogan (baseball player) (Youngstown)
- Cal Hogue (baseball player) (Dayton)
- Derek Holland (baseball player) (Newark)
- Lou Holtz (football coach) (East Liverpool)
- Sam Hornish Jr. (NASCAR driver) (Defiance)
- Jim Houston (football player) (Massillon)
- Desmond Howard (football player) (Cleveland)
- Dummy Hoy (deaf baseball player) (Houcktown)
- Brian Hoyer (football player) (North Olmsted)
- Andy Hrovat (Olympic freestyle wrestler) (Cleveland)
- Jalen Hudson (basketball player) (Akron)
- Aubrey Huff (baseball player) (Marion)
- Bob Huggins (basketball coach) (Gnadenhutten)
- Miller Huggins (Hall of Fame baseball player, manager) (Cincinnati)
- John Hughes (football player) (Gahanna)
- Kareem Hunt (football player) (Willoughby)
- Carlos Hyde (football player) (Cincinnati)
- Micah Hyde (football player) (Fostoria)
- The Irish Airborne (Dave and Mike Crist) (professional wrestlers) (Dayton)
- Shirley Fry Irvin (tennis player) (Akron)

J–M

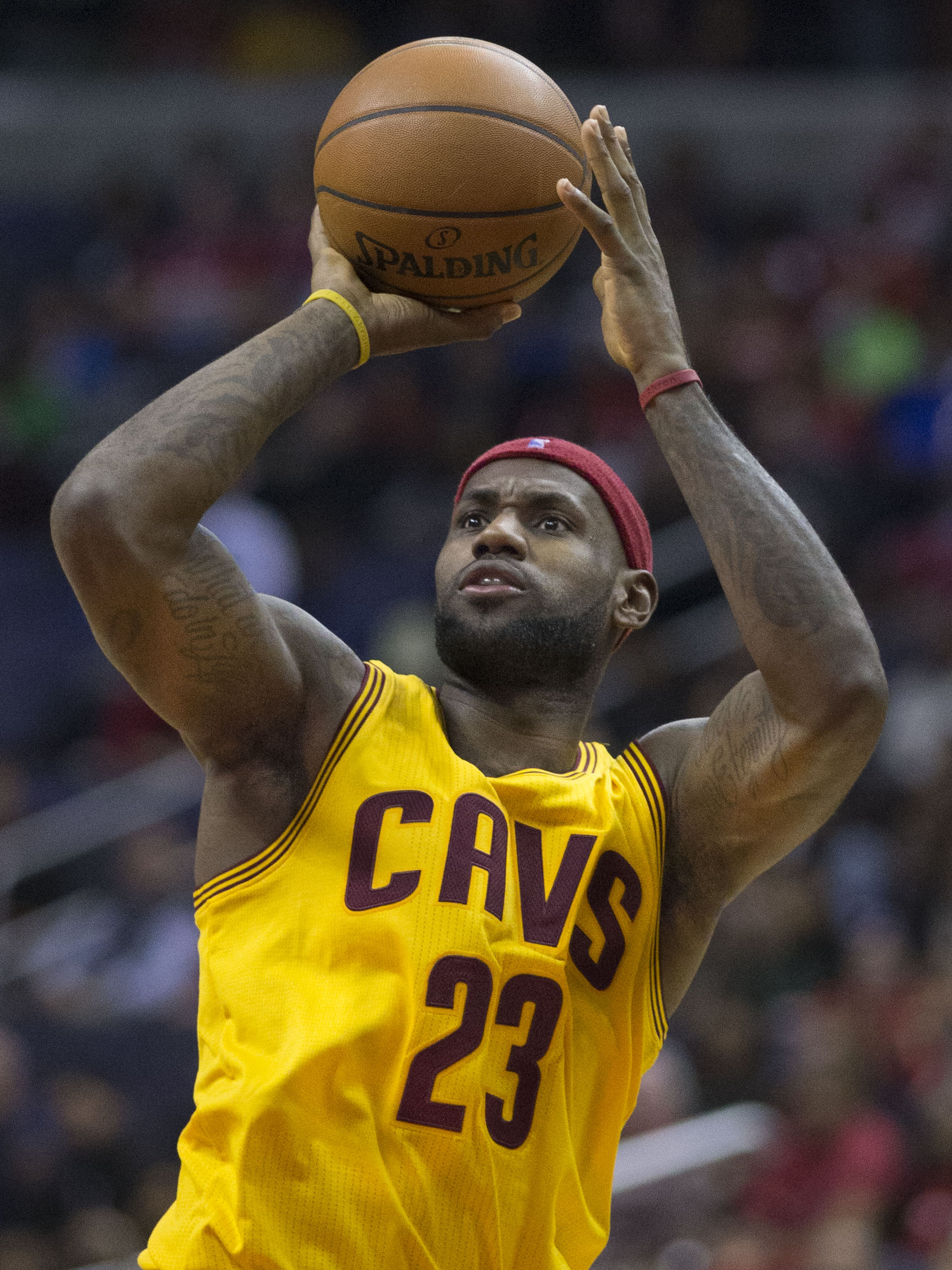
LeBron James

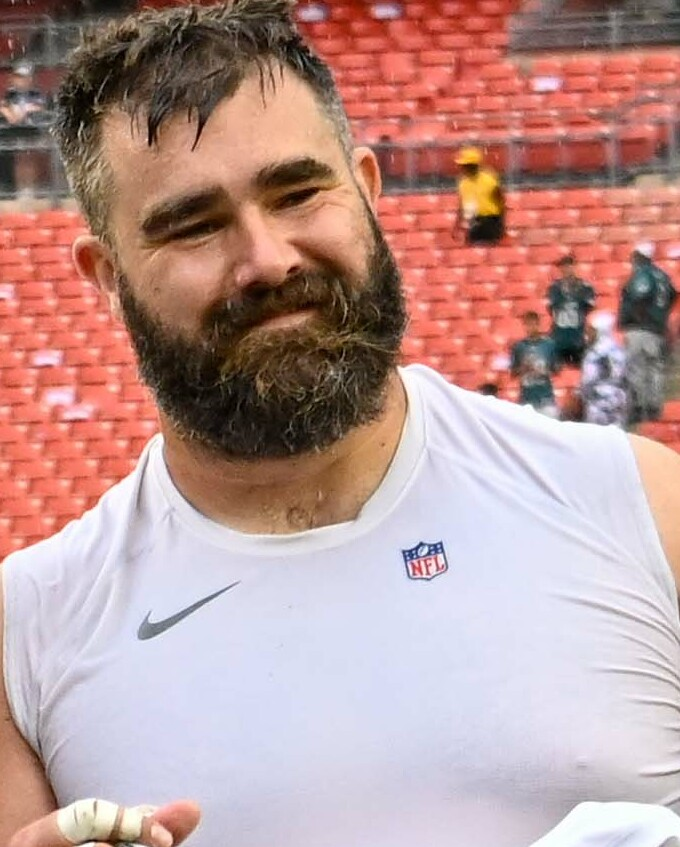
Jason Kelce

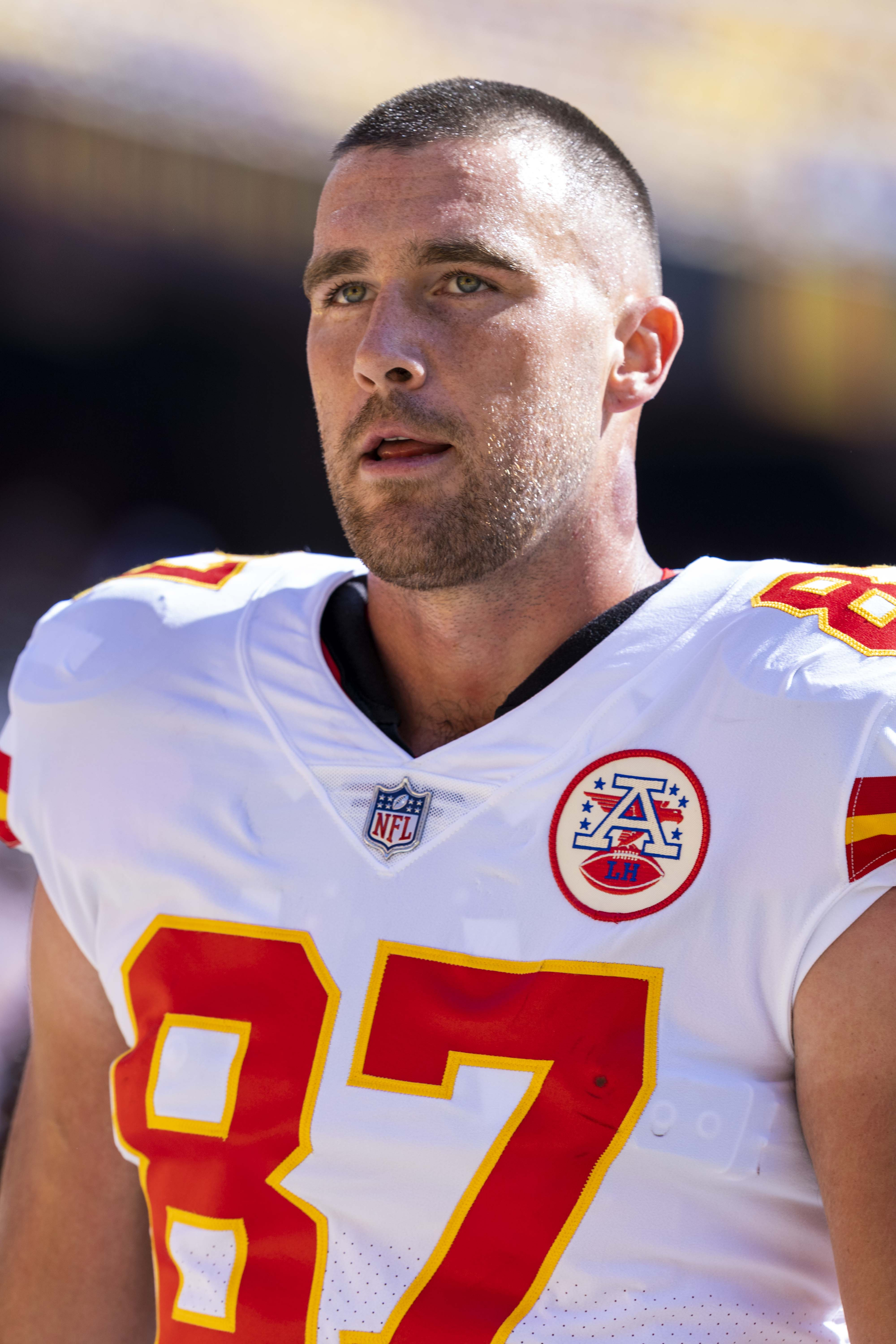
Travis Kelce

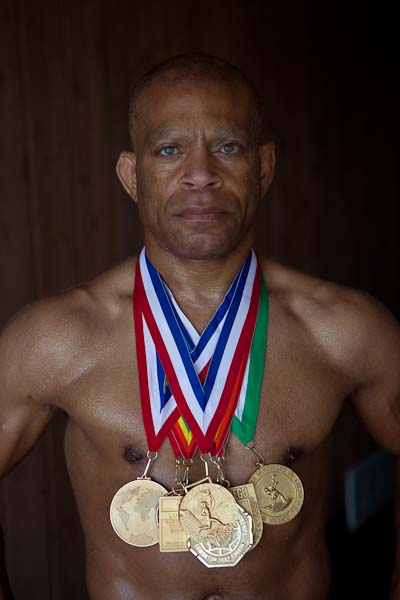
Leroy Kemp

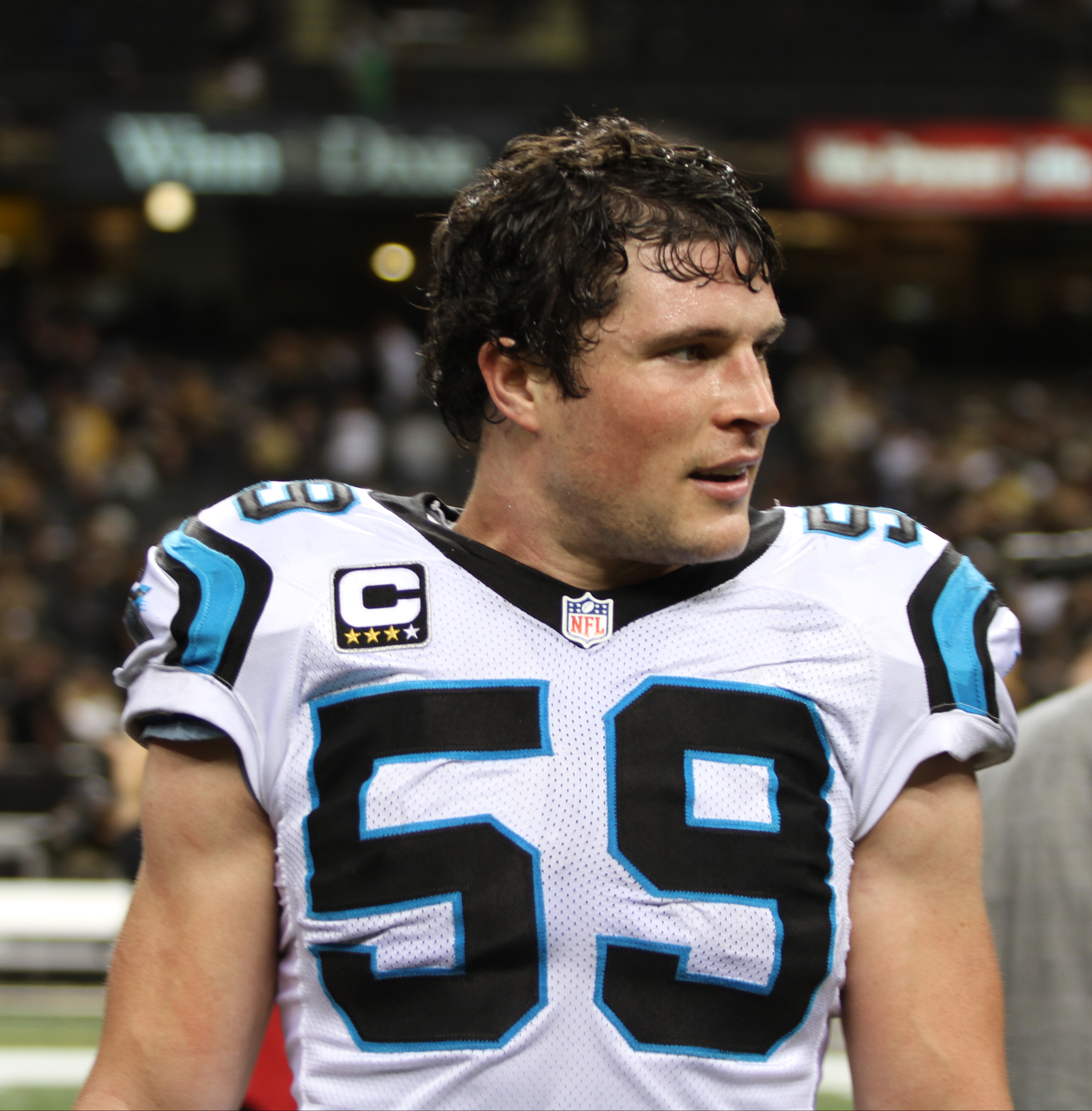
Luke Kuechly

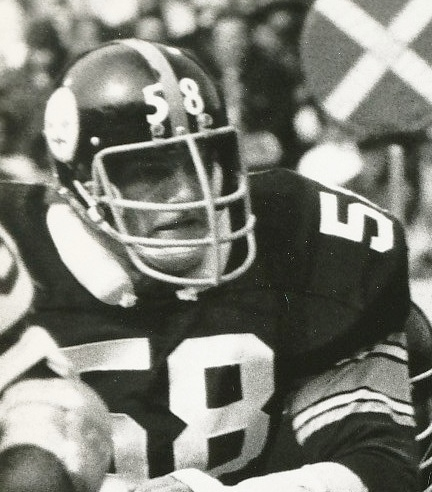
Jack Lambert

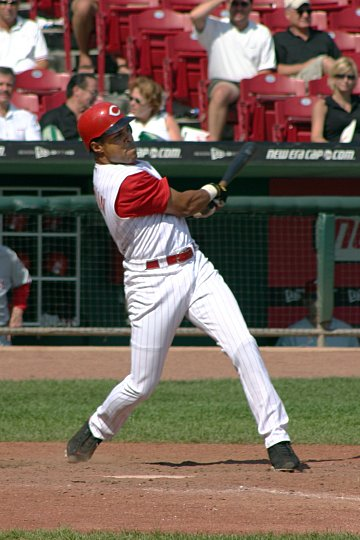
Barry Larkin

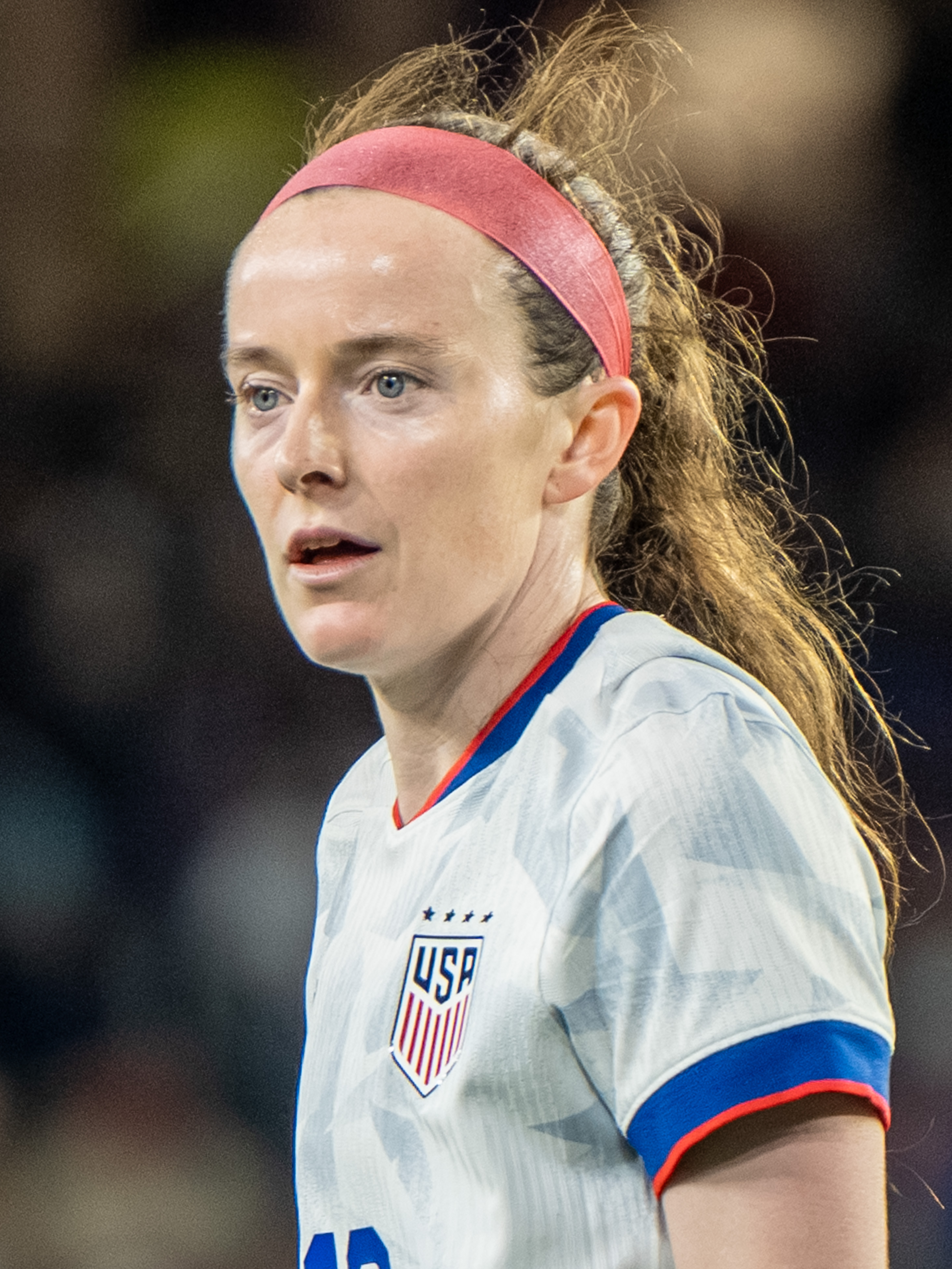
Rose Lavelle

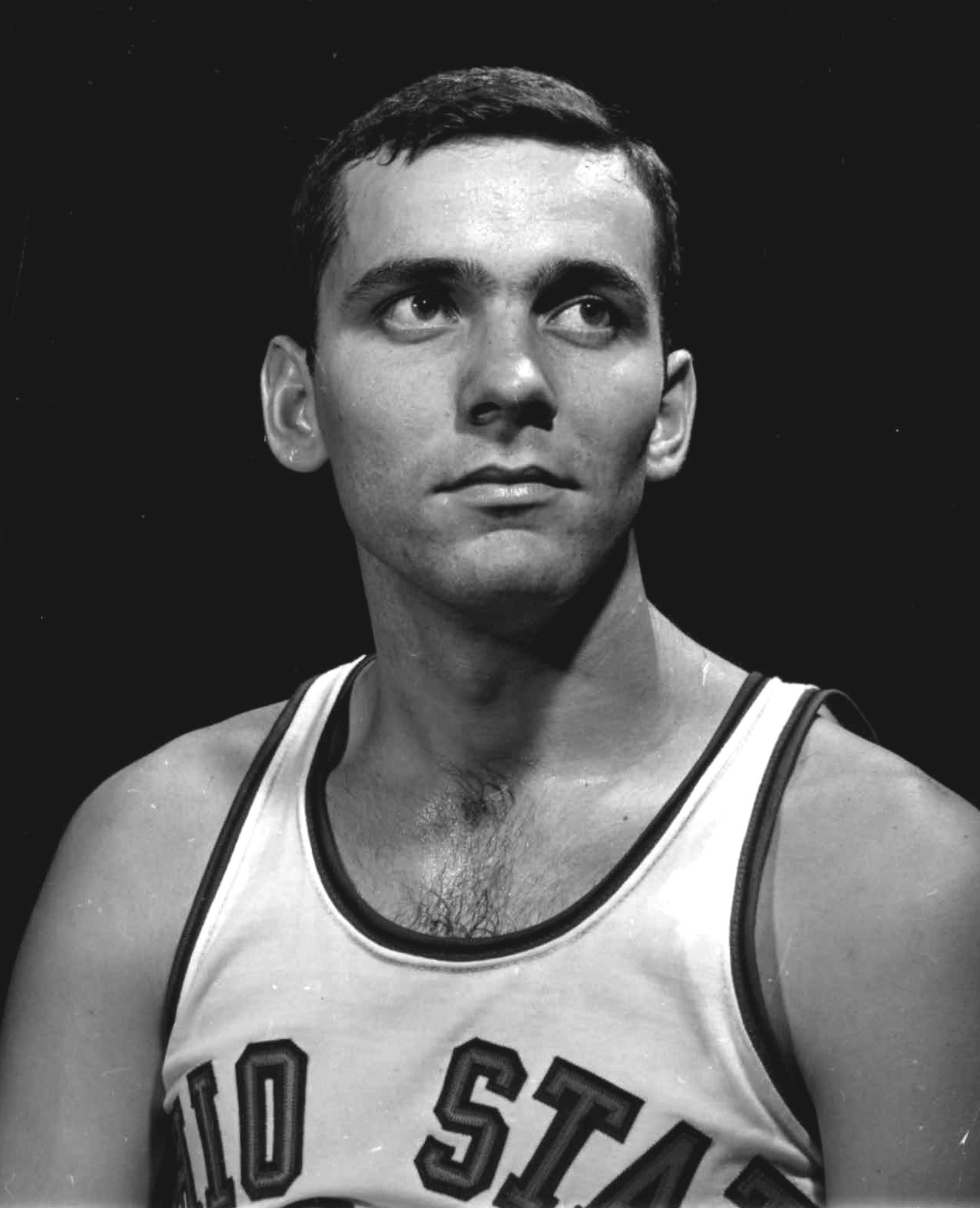
Jerry Lucas

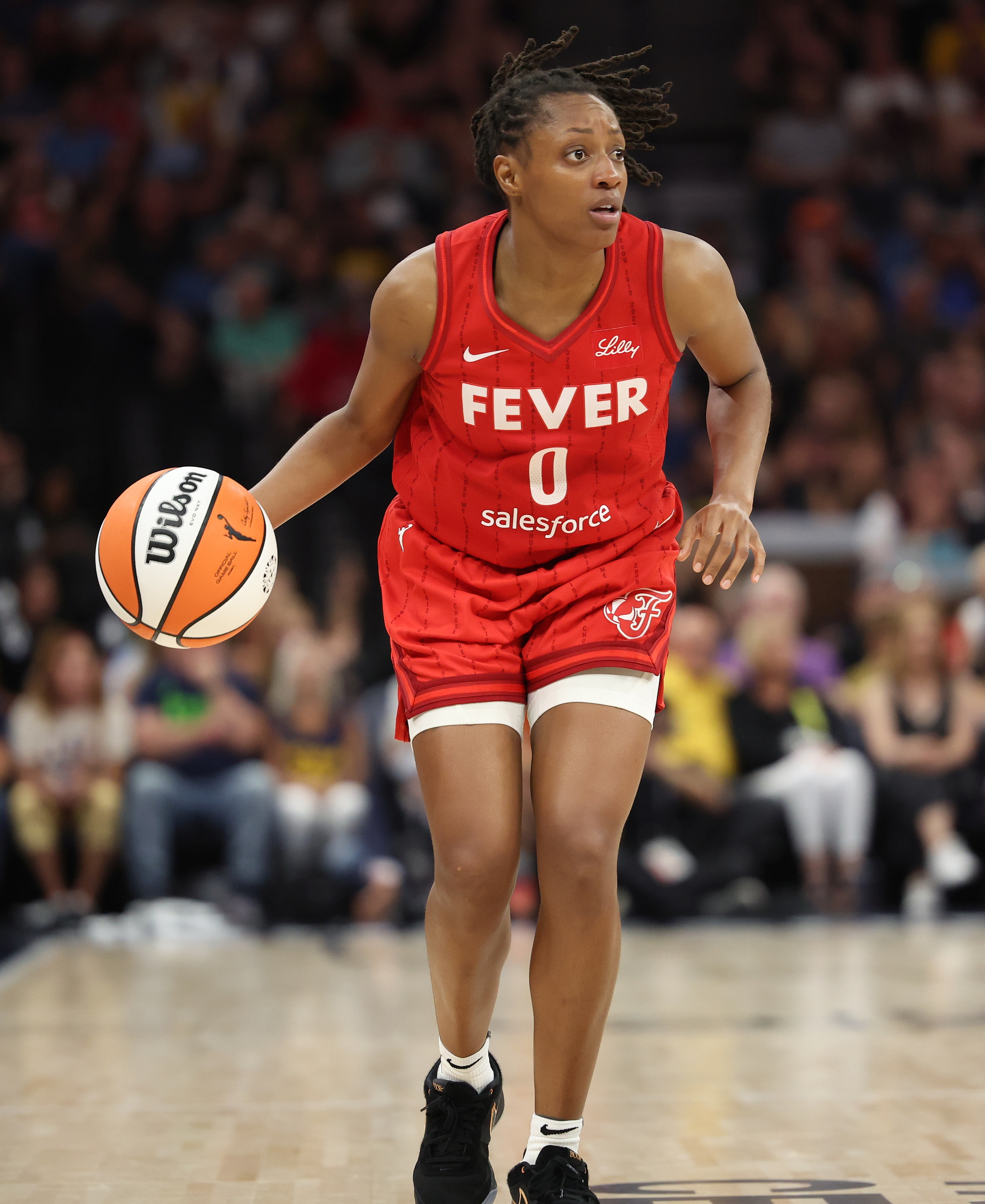
Kelsey Mitchell

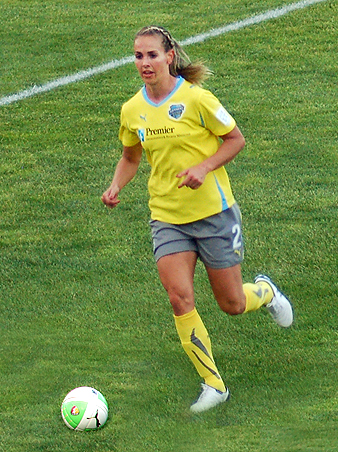
Heather Mitts

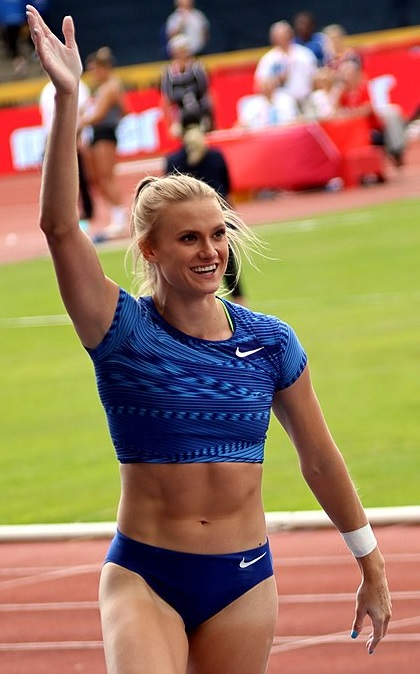
Katie Moon

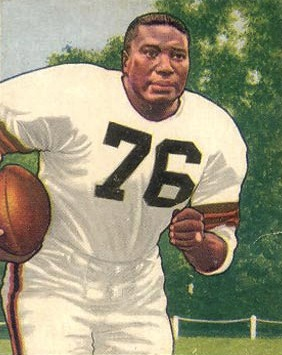
Marion Motley

- Jim Jackson (basketball player) (Toledo)
- Don James (basketball player and coach) (Massillon)
- LeBron James (basketball player) (Akron)
- Vic Janowicz (football player) (Elyria)
- David Jenkins (figure skating) (Akron)
- Hayes Alan Jenkins (figure skating) (Akron)
- Ban Johnson (baseball executive) (Norwalk)
- Gus Johnson (basketball player) (Akron)
- Home Run Johnson (baseball player) (Findlay)
- Lance Johnson (baseball player) (Cincinnati)
- Markell Johnson (basketball player) (Cleveland)
- Paris Johnson Jr. (football player) (Cincinnati)
- Will Johnson (football player) (Dayton)
- Cal Jones (football player) (Steubenville)
- Cardale Jones (football player) (Cleveland)
- Greg Jones (football player) (Cincinnati)
- Joe Jurevicius (football player) (Cleveland)
- David Justice (baseball player) (Cincinnati)
- Kyle Juszczyk (football player) (Medina)
- Rich Karlis (football player) (Salem)
- Larry Kehres (football coach) (Diamond)
- Jason Kelce (football player) (Cleveland Heights)
- Travis Kelce (football player) (Westlake)
- Clark Kellogg (basketball player) (East Cleveland)
- Leroy Kemp (freestyle wrestler) (Chardon)
- Don King (fight promoter) (Cleveland)
- DeShone Kizer (football player) (Toledo)
- Phil Klein (baseball player) (Columbus)
- Bob Knepper (baseball player) (Akron)
- Bob Knight (HOF basketball coach) (Massilon)
- Jack Kralick (baseball player) (Youngstown)
- Bernie Kosar (football player) (Boardman)
- Kosta Koufos (basketball player) (Canton)
- Jordan Kovacs (football player) (Curtice)
- Kevin Kowalski (football player) (Macedonia)
- Luke Kuechly (football player) (Cincinnati)
- Jim Lachey (football player) (St. Henry)
- Jack Lambert (Hall of Fame football player) (Mantua)
- Kenesaw Mountain Landis (first baseball commissioner) (Milleville)
- Barry Larkin (baseball player) (Cincinnati)
- Cody Latimer (football player) (Dayton)
- Marshon Lattimore (football player) (Cleveland)
- Rose Lavelle (soccer player) (Cincinnati)
- Dante Lavelli (football player) (Cleveland)
- Trevor Laws (football player) (Philadelphia Eagles) (Dayton)
- Dick LeBeau (football coach) (London)
- Theo Lemon (football player and coach) (Massillon)
- Justin Lester (Olympic Greco-Roman wrestler) (Akron)
- Jim Letcavits (football player) (Massillon)
- Jim Leyland (baseball manager) (Perrysburg)
- Jim Leyritz (baseball player) (Lakewood)
- Kory Lichtensteiger (football player) (Van Wert)
- Frank Lickliter (professional golfer) (Franklin)
- Matt Light (football player) (Greenville)
- Tyler Light (golfer) (Massillon)
- Jon Link (baseball player) (Columbus)
- Jeff Linkenbach (football player) (Sandusky)
- Corey Linsley (football player) (Youngstown)
- David Lough (baseball player) (Akron)
- Jerry Lucas (basketball player) (Middletown)
- Steve Luke (football player) (Massillon)
- Shawn Lutz (football coach) (Massillon)
- Rob Lytle (football player) (Fremont)
- Barry MacKay (tennis player, broadcaster) (Cincinnati)
- Mike Maddux (baseball player, coach) (Dayton)
- Paul Maguire (football player, announcer) (Youngstown)
- Ray Mancini (boxer) (Youngstown)
- Nick Mangold (football player) (Centerville)
- Mario Manningham (football player) (Warren)
- Matt Marksberry (baseball player) (Cincinnati)
- Rube Marquard (Baseball Hall of Fame pitcher) (Cleveland)
- Jim Martin (football player) (Cleveland)
- Kevin Martin (basketball player) (Zanesville)
- Justin Masterson (baseball player) (Beavercreek)
- Michael Matthews (football player) (Cincinnati)
- Scott May (basketball player) (Sandusky)
- Bill Mazeroski (baseball player) (Tiltonsville)
- Jimmy McAleer (baseball player) (Youngstown)
- Josh McDaniels (football coach) (Canton)
- Ron McDole (football player) (Toledo)
- Roger McDowell (baseball player, coach) (Cincinnati)
- Will McEnaney (baseball player) (Springfield)
- Paul McFadden (football player) (Cleveland)
- Mike McGlynn (football player) (Austintown)
- Deacon McGuire (baseball player) (Youngstown)
- Brandon McKinney (football player) (Dayton)
- Jake McQuaide (football player) (Cincinnati)
- Lance Mehl (football player) (Bellaire)
- Zoltan Mesko (football player) (Twinsburg)
- Jack Mewhort (football player) (Toledo)
- Urban Meyer (football coach) (Ashtabula)
- Doug Mientkiewicz (baseball player) (Toledo)
- Linda Miles (professional wrestler) (Cincinnati)
- Creighton Miller (football player) (Cleveland)
- Jim Miller (football coach) (Massillon)
- Stipe Miocic (UFC fighter) (Cleveland)
- Kelsey Mitchell (basketball player) (Sharonville)
- Heather Mitts (soccer player) (Cincinnati)
- Mike Mizanin (professional wrestler) (Cleveland)
- Dominique Moceanu (gymnast) (Hinckley)
- Antwaun Molden (football player) (Warren)
- Ed Molinski (football player) (Massillon)
- Katie Moon (pole vaulter) (Lakewood)
- Lance Moore (football player) (Westerville)
- Joe Morrison (football player, coach) (Lima)
- Edwin C. Moses (runner) (Dayton)
- Marion Motley (Hall of Fame football player) (Canton)
- Scott Mruczkowski (football player) (Garfield Heights)
- Byron Mullens (basketball player) (Canal Winchester)
- Thurman Munson (baseball player) (Canton)
- Chet Mutryn (football player) (Cleveland)

N–Q

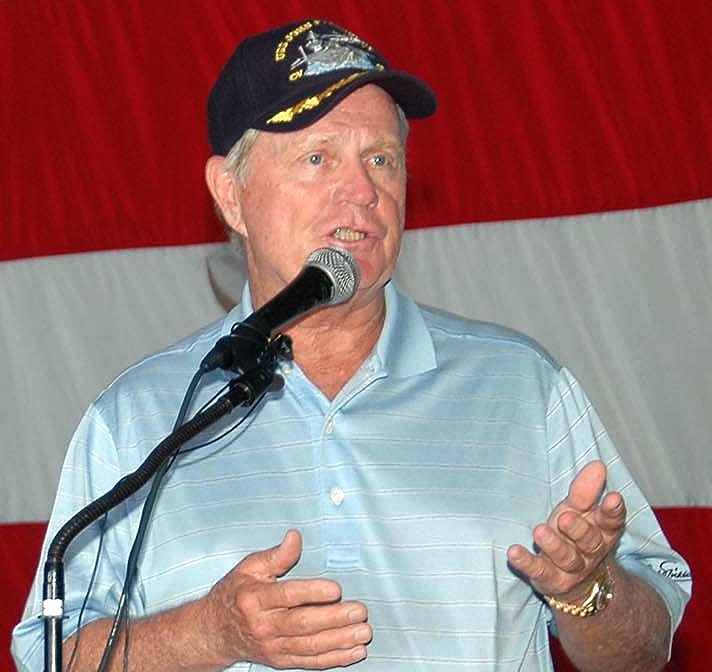
Jack Nicklaus

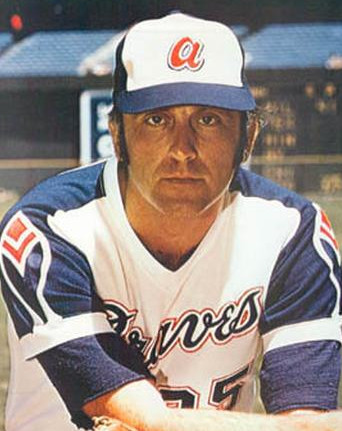
Phil Niekro

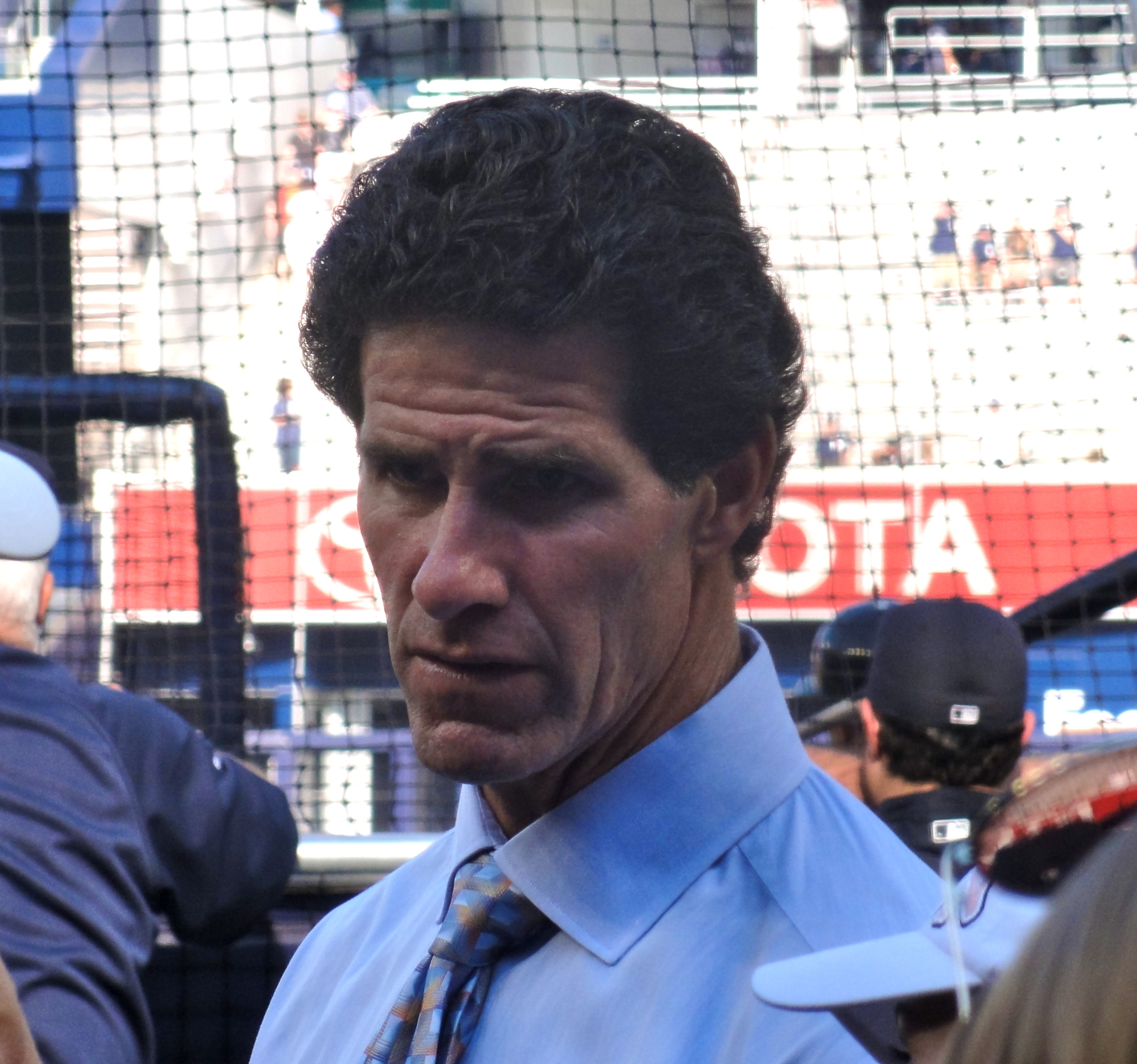
Paul O'Neill

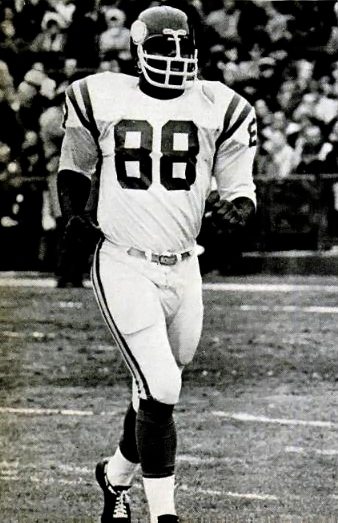
Alan Page

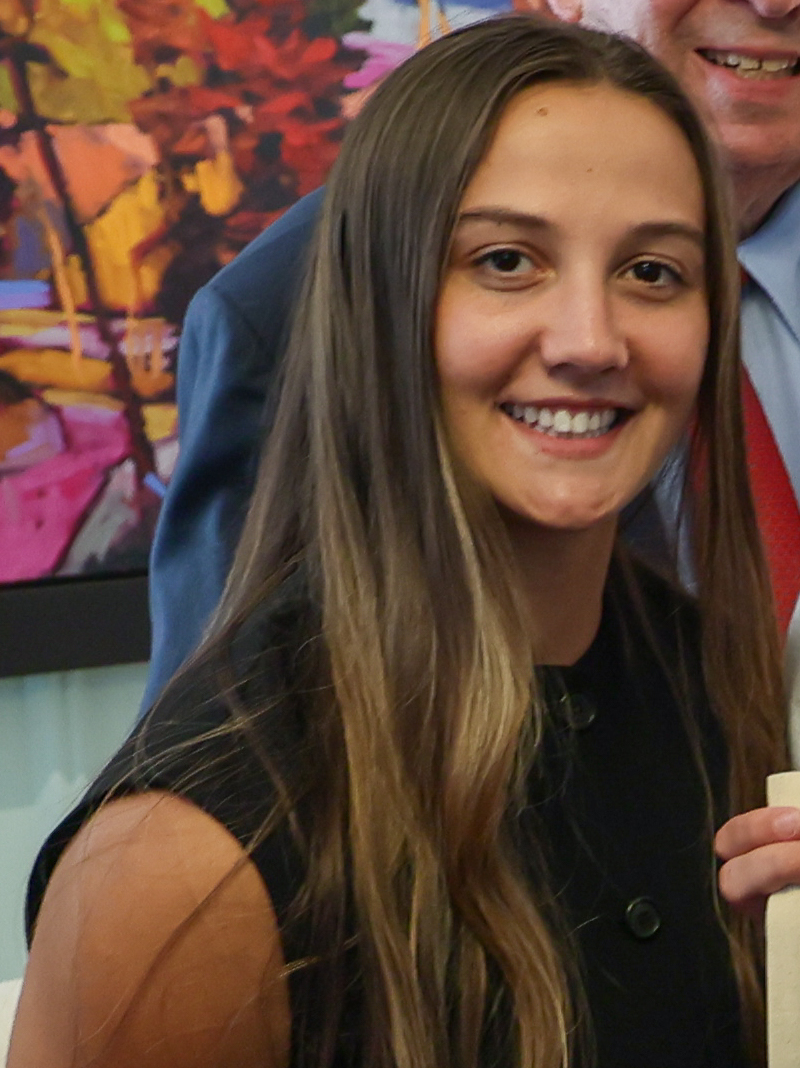
Gwyneth Philips

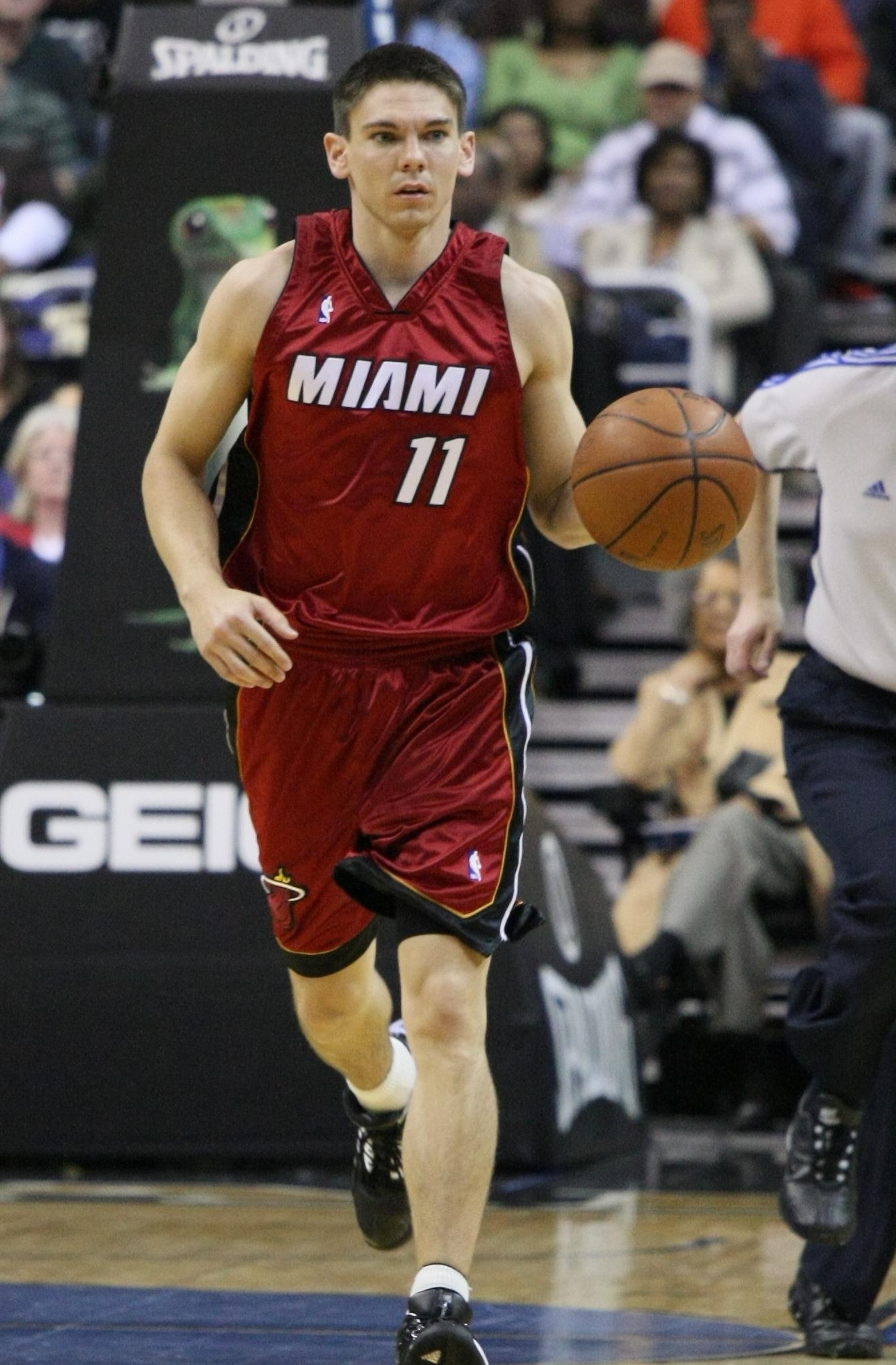
Chris Quinn

- Bill Nagy (football player) (Hudson)
- Haruki Nakamura (football player) (Elyria)
- Alex Nedeljkovic (hockey player) (Parma)
- Don Nehlen (college football coach) (Mansfield)
- Al Nesser (football player) (Columbus)
- Frank Nesser (football player) (Dennison)
- Phil Nesser (football player) (Columbus)
- Ted Nesser (football player, coach) (Dennison)
- Jack Nicklaus (golfer) (Columbus)
- Joe Niekro (baseball player) (Blaine)
- Phil Niekro (baseball player) (Blaine)
- Jon Niese (baseball player) (Lima)
- Dustin Nippert (baseball player) (Beallsville)
- Chuck Noll (football coach) (Cleveland)
- Ray Nolting (football player, coach) (Cincinnati)
- Joe Norman (football player) (Millersburg)
- Andrew Norwell (football player) (Cincinnati)
- Mike Nugent (football player) (Centerville)
- Joe Nuxhall (baseball player and sportscaster) (Hamilton)
- Annie Oakley (Wild West markswoman) (Darke)
- Owamagbe Odighizuwa (football player) (Columbus)
- Deji Olatoye (football player) (Cleveland)
- Barney Oldfield (racing driver) (Wauseon)
- Al Oliver (baseball player) (Portsmouth)
- Jerry Olsavsky (football player) (Youngstown)
- Patrick Omameh (football player) (Columbus)
- Paul O'Neill (baseball player) (Columbus)
- Jesse Owens (Runner, Olympic Champion) (Cleveland)
- Akwasi Owusu-Ansah (football player) (Columbus)
- Darrell Pace (olympic archer) (Cincinnati)
- Orlando Pace (football player) (Sandusky)
- Alan Page (Hall of Fame football player, judge) (Canton)
- Lance Palmer (MMA fighter and folkstyle wrestler) (Columbia Station)
- Betty Pariso (IFBB professional bodybuilder) (Columbus)
- Peggy Parratt (football player, coach) (Cleveland)
- Ara Parseghian (football coach) (Akron)
- Kelly Pavlik (WBC champion, boxer) (Youngstown)
- Jim Paxson (basketball player) (Dayton)
- John Paxson (basketball player) (Dayton)
- Jay Payton (baseball player) (Zanesville)
- Antwan Peek (football player) (Cincinnati)
- Mike Pelfrey (baseball player) (Wright-Patterson Air Force Base)
- Bo Pelini (football coach) (Youngstown)
- Carl Pelini (football coach) (Youngstown)
- Eduardo Pérez (baseball player) (Cincinnati)
- Gwyneth Philips (ice hockey player) (Athens)
- Tony Pike (football player) (Cincinnati)
- Brian Pillman (football player, professional wrestler) (Cincinnati)
- Antonio Pittman (football player) (Akron)
- Shawn Porter (boxer) (Cleveland)
- James Posey (basketball player) (Cleveland)
- Wally Post (baseball player) (Wendelin)
- Matt Prater (football player) (Mayfield Heights)
- Taylor Price (football player) (Hilliard)
- Henry Prusoff (tennis player) (Cleveland)
- Brady Quinn (football player) (Columbus)
- Chris Quinn (basketball player) (Dublin)

R–S

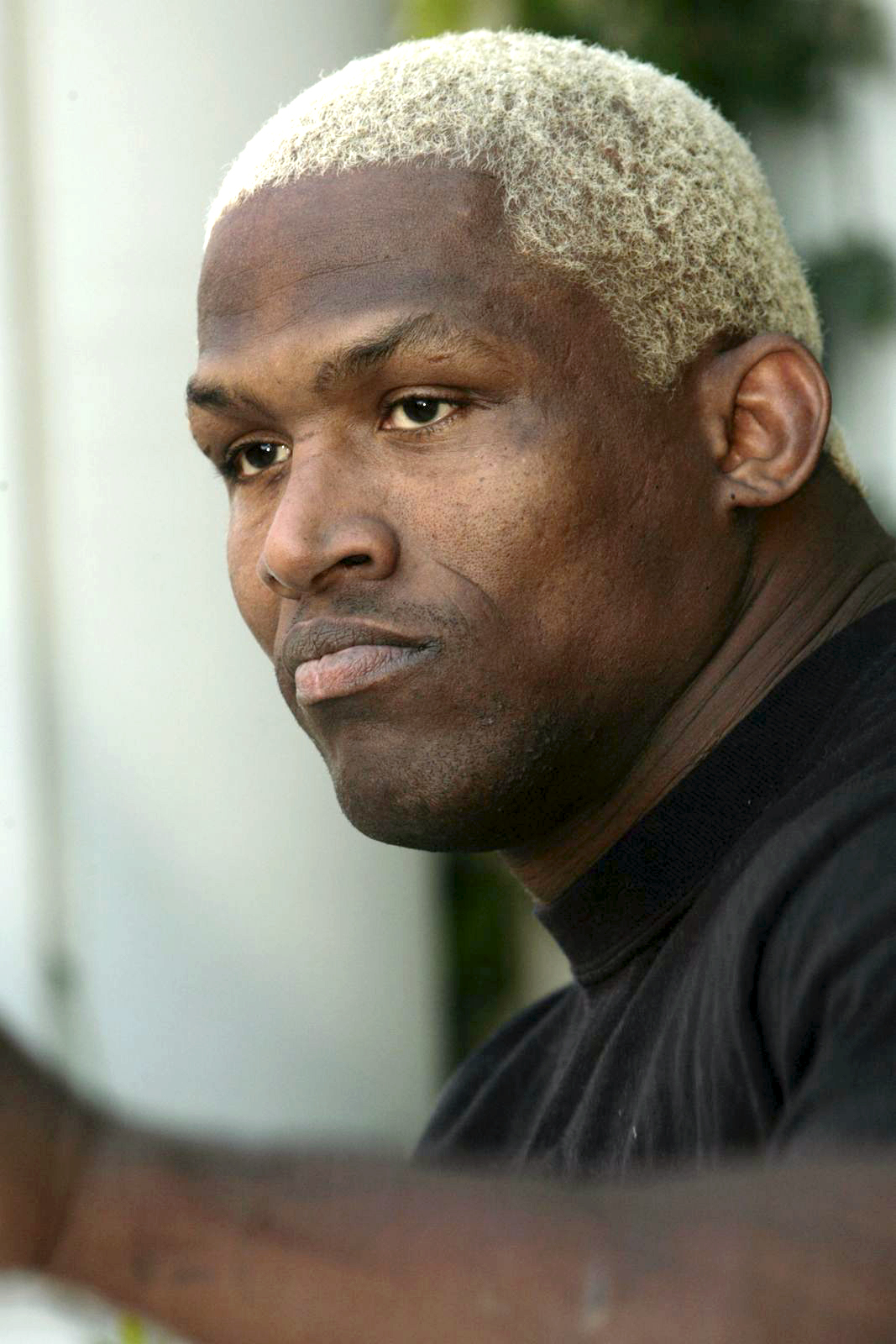
Kevin Randleman

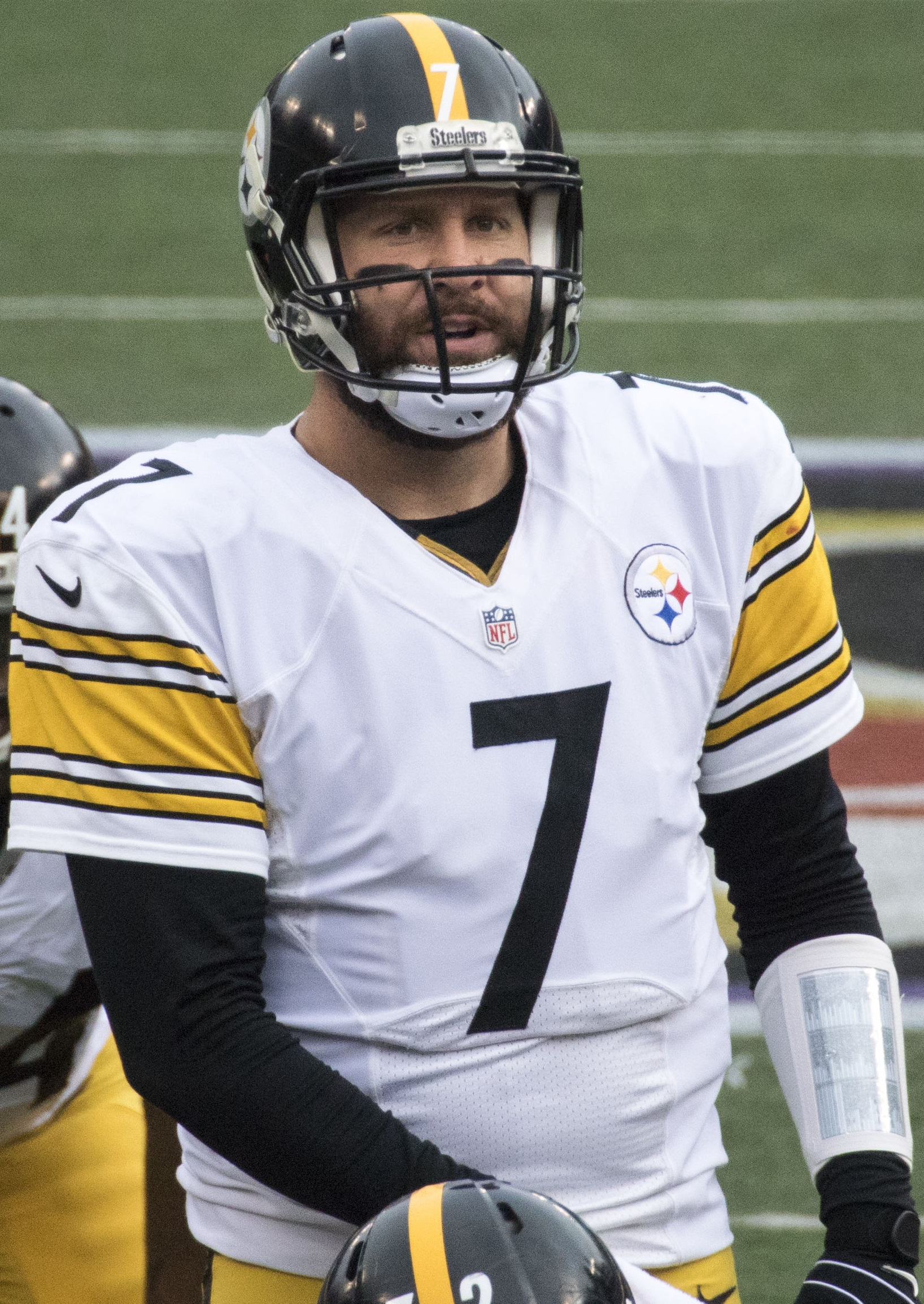
Ben Roethlisberger

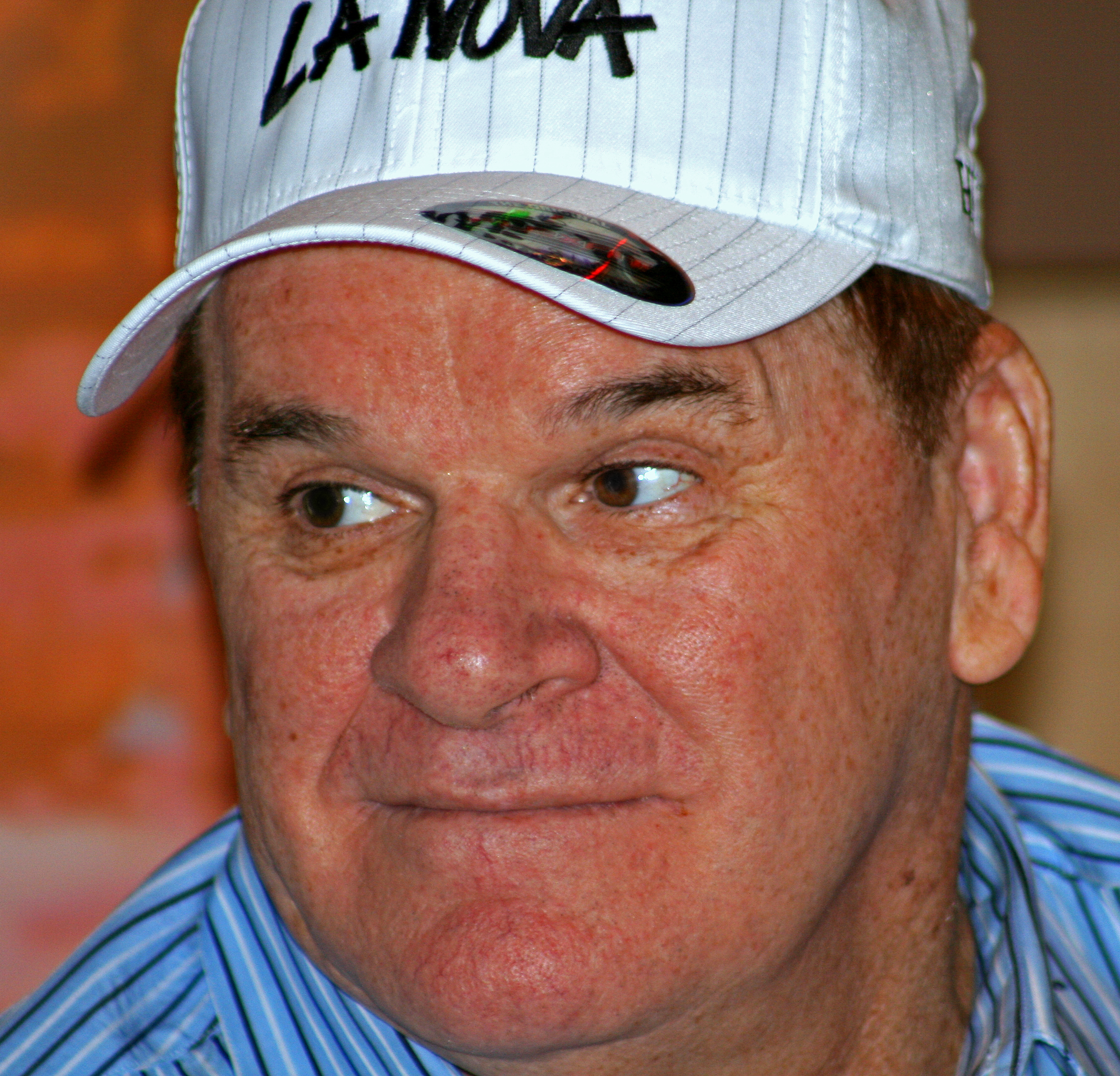
Pete Rose

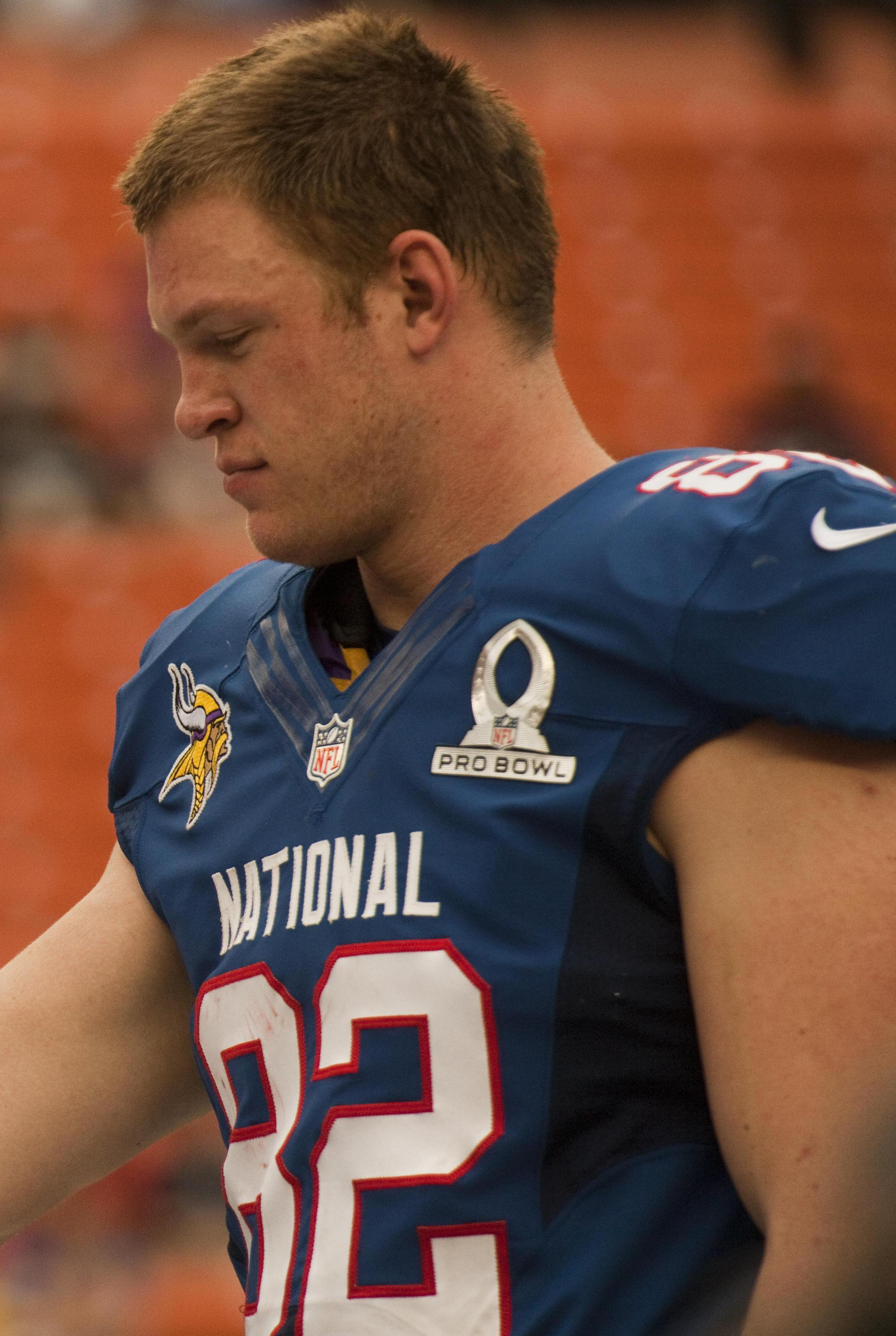
Kyle Rudolph

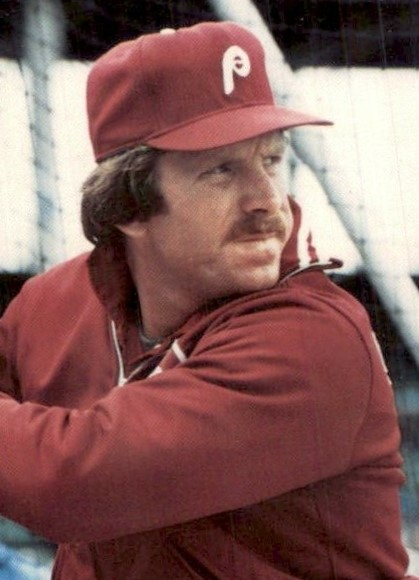
Mike Schmidt

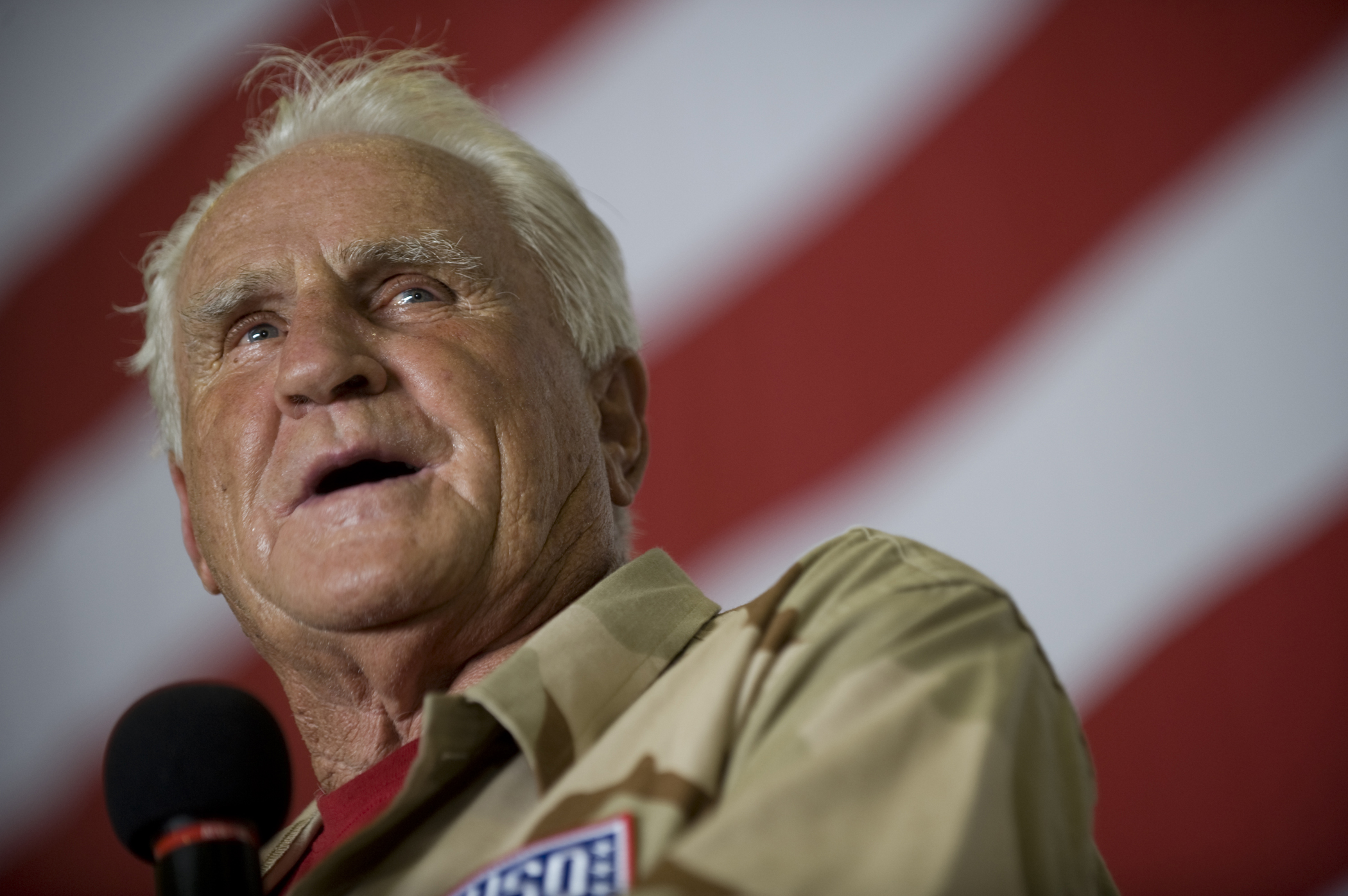
Don Shula

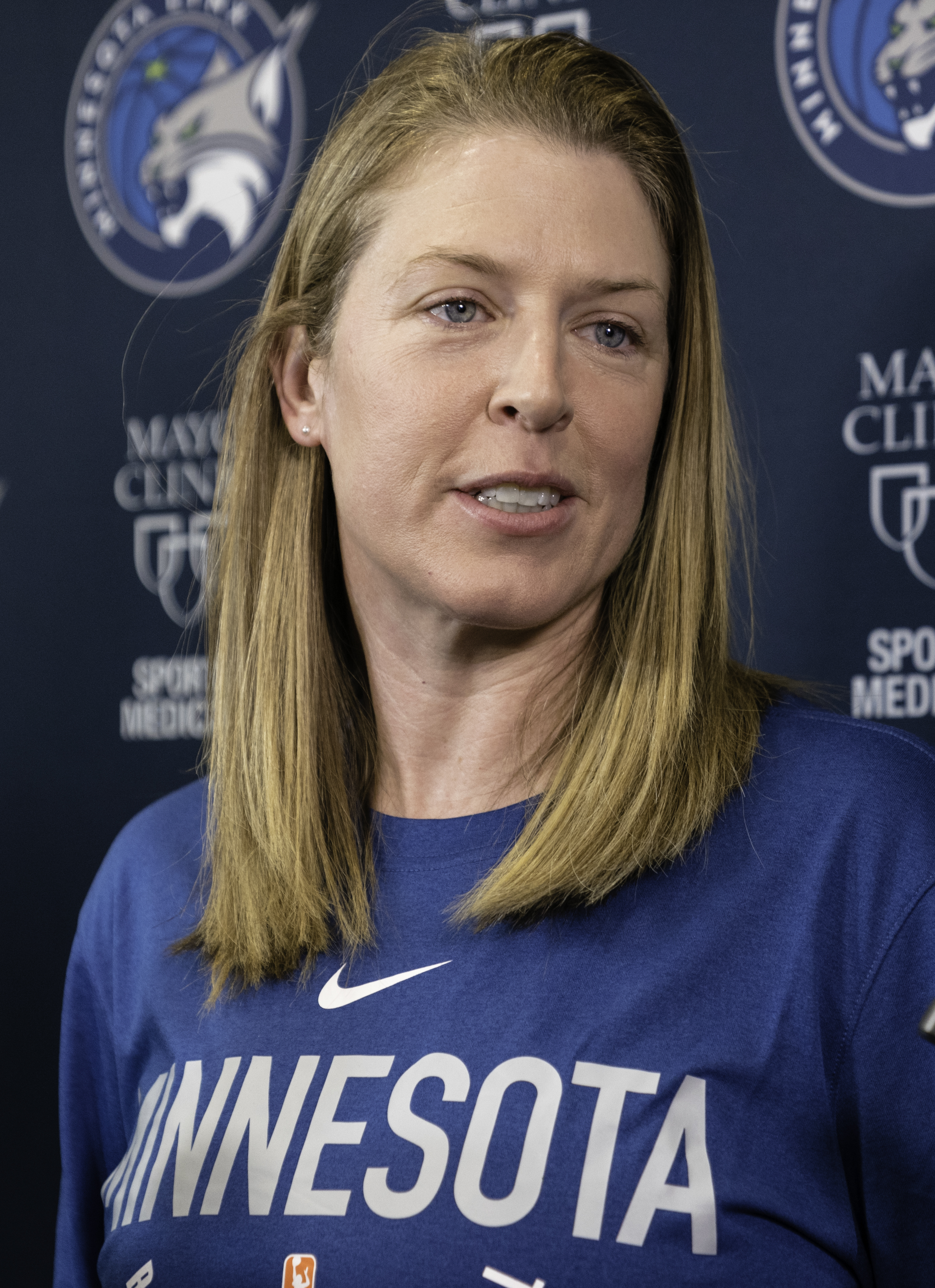
Katie Smith

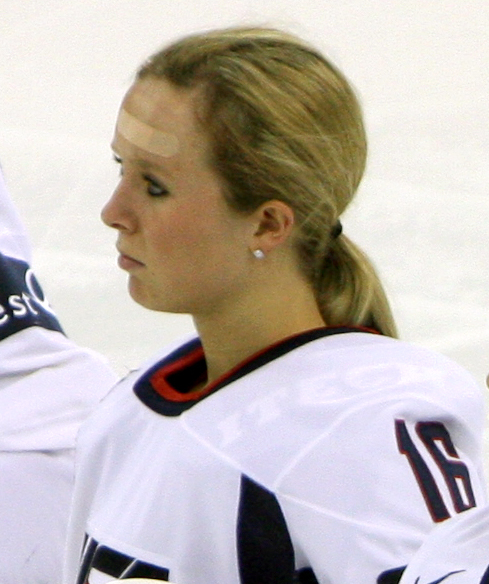
Kelli Stack

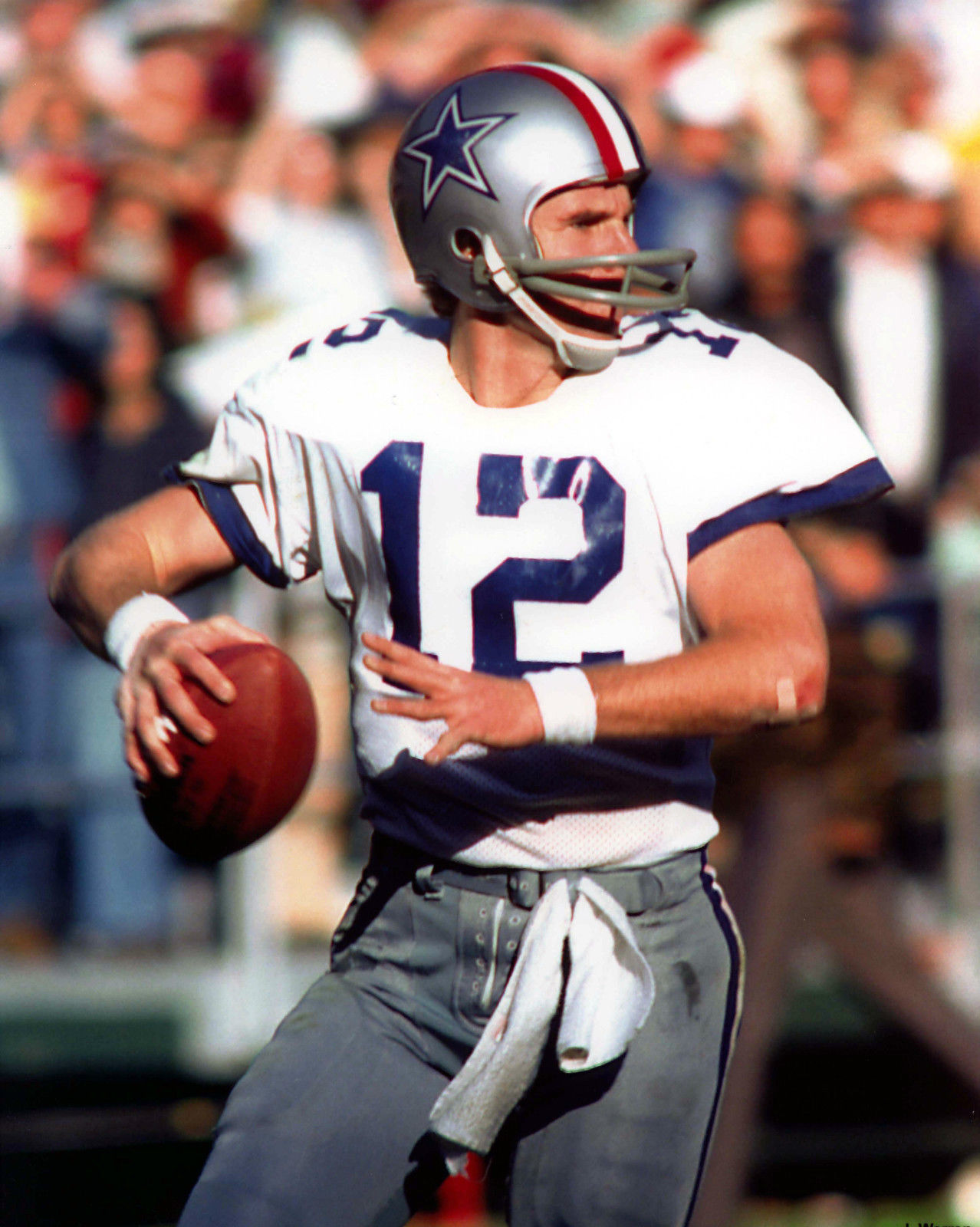
Roger Staubach

- Bobby Rahal (race car driver) (Medina)
- Graham Rahal (race car driver) (Columbus)
- Kevin Randleman (UFC fighter, professional wrestler, folkstyle wrestler) (Sandusky)
- Dominic Randolph (football player) (Amelia)
- Tim Rattay (football player) (Elyria)
- George Ratterman (football player) (Cincinnati)
- Jeff Reboulet (baseball player) (Kettering)
- Michael Redd (basketball player) (Columbus)
- Devine Redding (football player) (Youngstown)
- Tim Richmond (race car driver) (Ashland)
- Branch Rickey (baseball manager) (Stockdale)
- Cy Rigler (baseball umpire) (Massillon)
- Javon Ringer (football player) (Dayton)
- Brian Roberts (basketball player) (Toledo)
- Dave Roberts (baseball player) (Gallipolis)
- Alvin Robertson (basketball player) (Barberton)
- Jamal Robertson (football player) (Springfield)
- Ryne Robinson (football player) (Toledo)
- Brian Robiskie (football player) (Cleveland)
- Chaz Roe (baseball player) (Steubenville)
- Ben Roethlisberger (football player) (Findlay)
- Dean Roll (professional wrestler) (Dayton)
- Mauri Rose (racing driver) (Columbus)
- Pete Rose (baseball player, manager) (Cincinnati)
- Scott Roth (basketball player, coach) (Cleveland)
- Edd Roush (baseball player) (Cincinnati)
- Eric Rowe (football player) (Cleveland)
- Tommy Rowlands (freestyle and folkstyle wrestler) (Columbus)
- Terry Rozier (basketball player) (Youngstown)
- Ryan Rua (baseball player) (Amherst)
- Kyle Rudolph (football player) (Cincinnati)
- Mike Rupp (hockey player) (Cleveland Heights)
- Gary Russell (football player) (Columbus)
- Rodger Saffold (football player) (Bedford)
- Perry Saturn (professional wrestler) (Cleveland)
- "Macho Man" Randy Savage (professional wrestler) (Columbus)
- Bo Schembechler (football coach) (Barberton)
- Mike Schmidt (baseball player) (Dayton)
- Bob Schul (runner, Olympic gold medalist) (West Milton)
- Kyle Schwarber (baseball player) (Middletown)
- Devon Scott (basketball player) (Columbus)
- Adam Shaheen (football player) (Galena)
- Travis Shaw (baseball player) (Washington Court House)
- Cecil Shorts III (football player) (Kent)
- George Shuba (baseball player) (Youngstown)
- J. B. Shuck (baseball player) (Galion)
- Don Shula (football coach) (Painesville)
- Larry Shyatt (basketball coach) (Cleveland)
- Larry Siegfried (basketball player) (Shelby)
- John Simon (football player) (Youngstown)
- Rob Sims (football player) (Macedonia)
- Frank Sinkwich (Heisman Trophy recipient) (Youngstown)
- George Sisler (baseball player) (Manchester)
- Brad Smith (football player) (Youngstown)
- Chris Smith (football coach) (Massillon)
- Joe Smith (baseball player) (Cincinnati)
- Katie Smith (basketball player) (Logan)
- Robert Scott Smith (football player) (Euclid)
- Steve Smith (baseball coach) (Canton)
- Troy Smith (football player) (Cleveland)
- Dawuane Smoot (football player) (Groverport)
- Al Snow (professional wrestler) (Lima)
- Eric Snow (basketball player, coach) (Canton)
- Bob Snyder (football player, coach) (Toledo)
- Andy Sonnanstine (baseball player) (Barberton)
- Joe Sparma (football and baseball player) (Massillon)
- Tim Spencer (football player, coach) (Martins Ferry)
- Willie Spencer (football player) (Massillon)
- Kelli Stack (ice hockey player) (Cleveland)
- Craig Stammen (baseball player) (North Star)
- Roger Staubach (football player) (Cincinnati)
- Harry Steel (Olympic freestyle wrestler) (East Sparta)
- Dominique Steele (mixed martial artist) (Norwood)
- George Steinbrenner (owner of NY Yankees) (Rocky River)
- Shannon Stewart (baseball player)
- Logan Stieber (freestyle and folkstyle wrestler) (Monroeville)
- Steve Stone (baseball pitcher, sportscaster) (South Euclid)
- Carl Storck (NFL president) (Dayton)
- Zach Strief (football player) (Cincinnati)
- Korey Stringer (football player) (Warren)
- Harry Stuhldreher (football player, coach, administrator) (Massillon)
- Tyrell Sutton (football player) (Akron)
- Willard Swihart (basketball player) (Massillon)
- Nick Swisher (baseball player) (Worthington)

T–Z

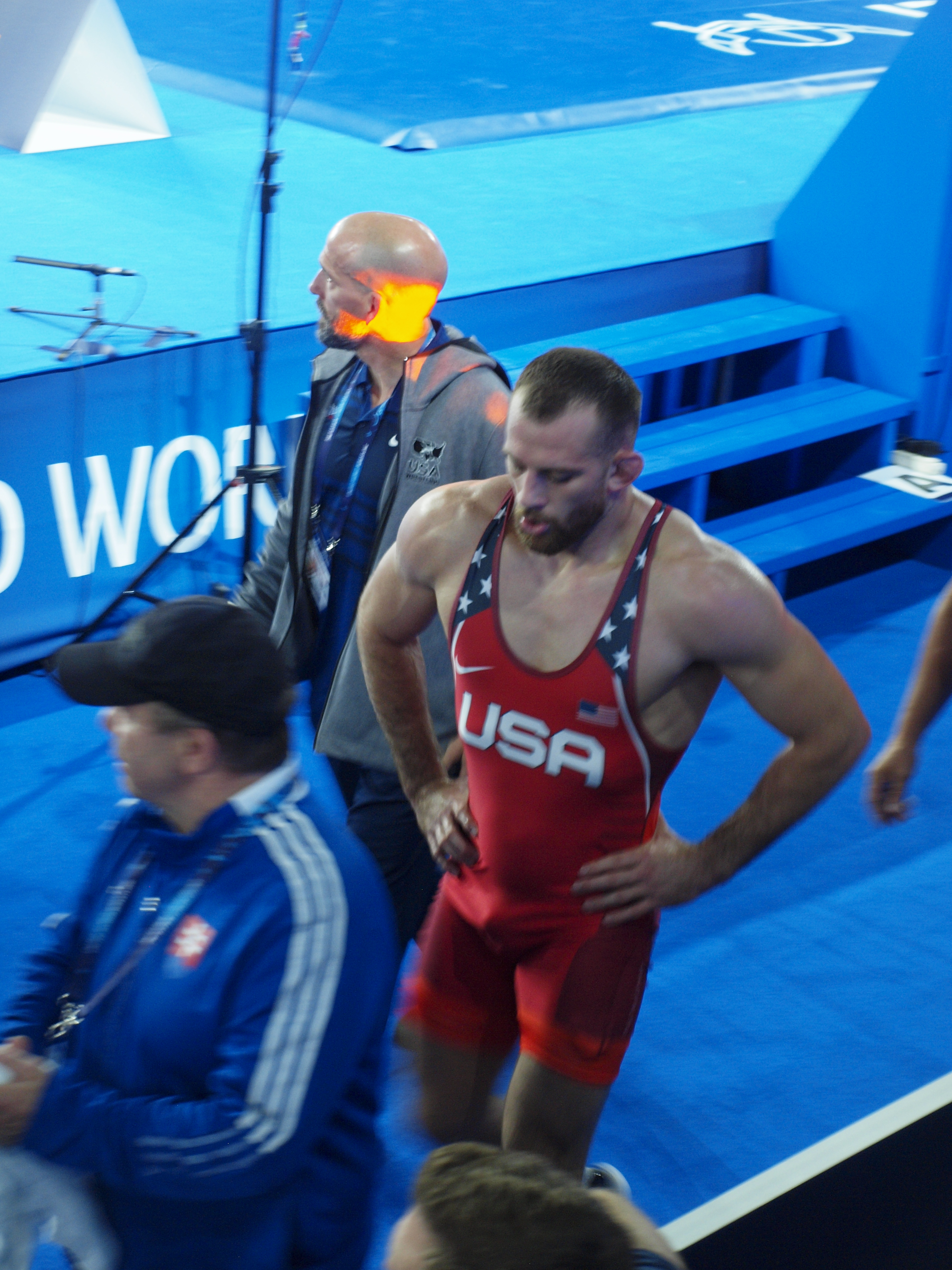
David Taylor

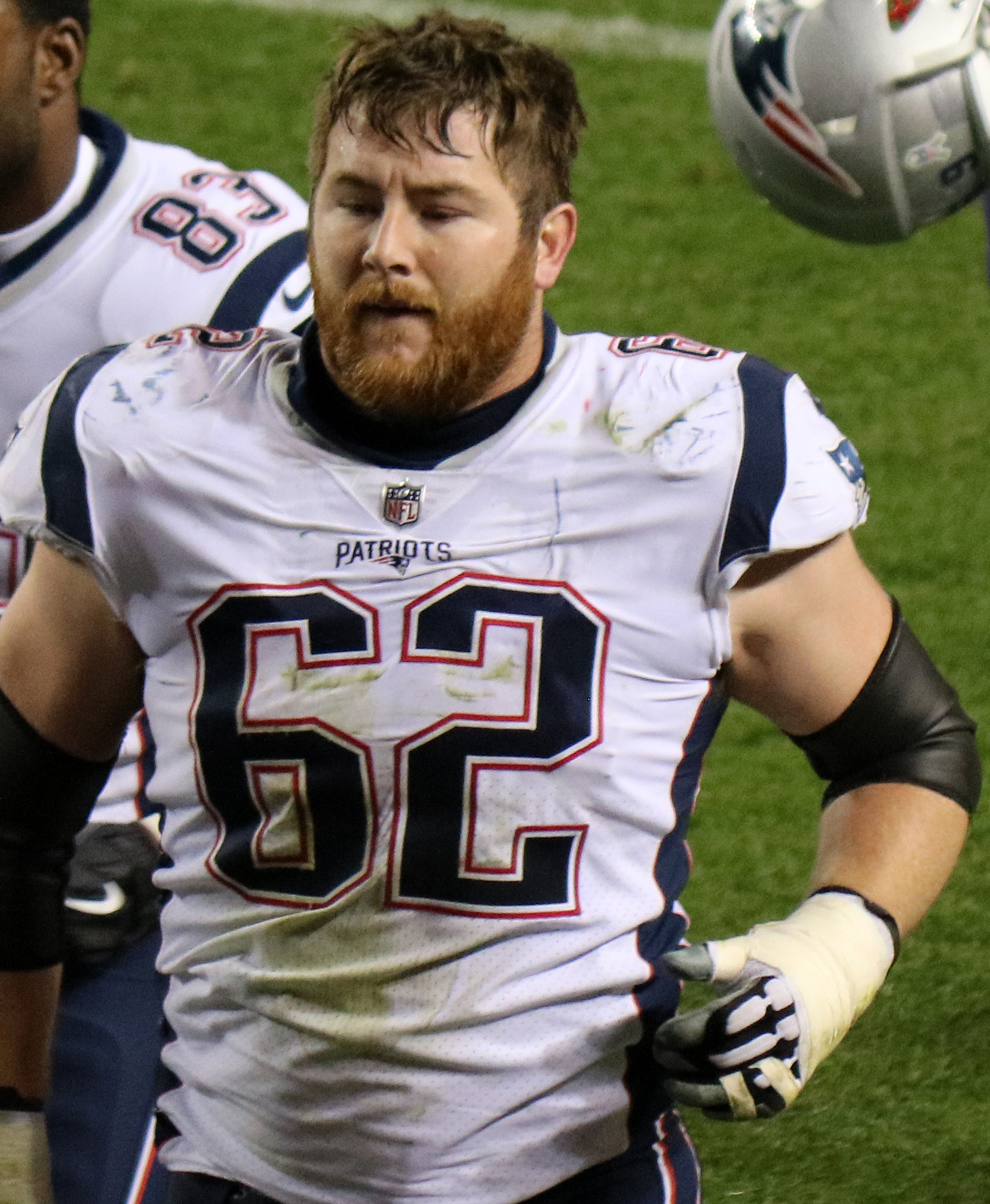
Joe Thuney

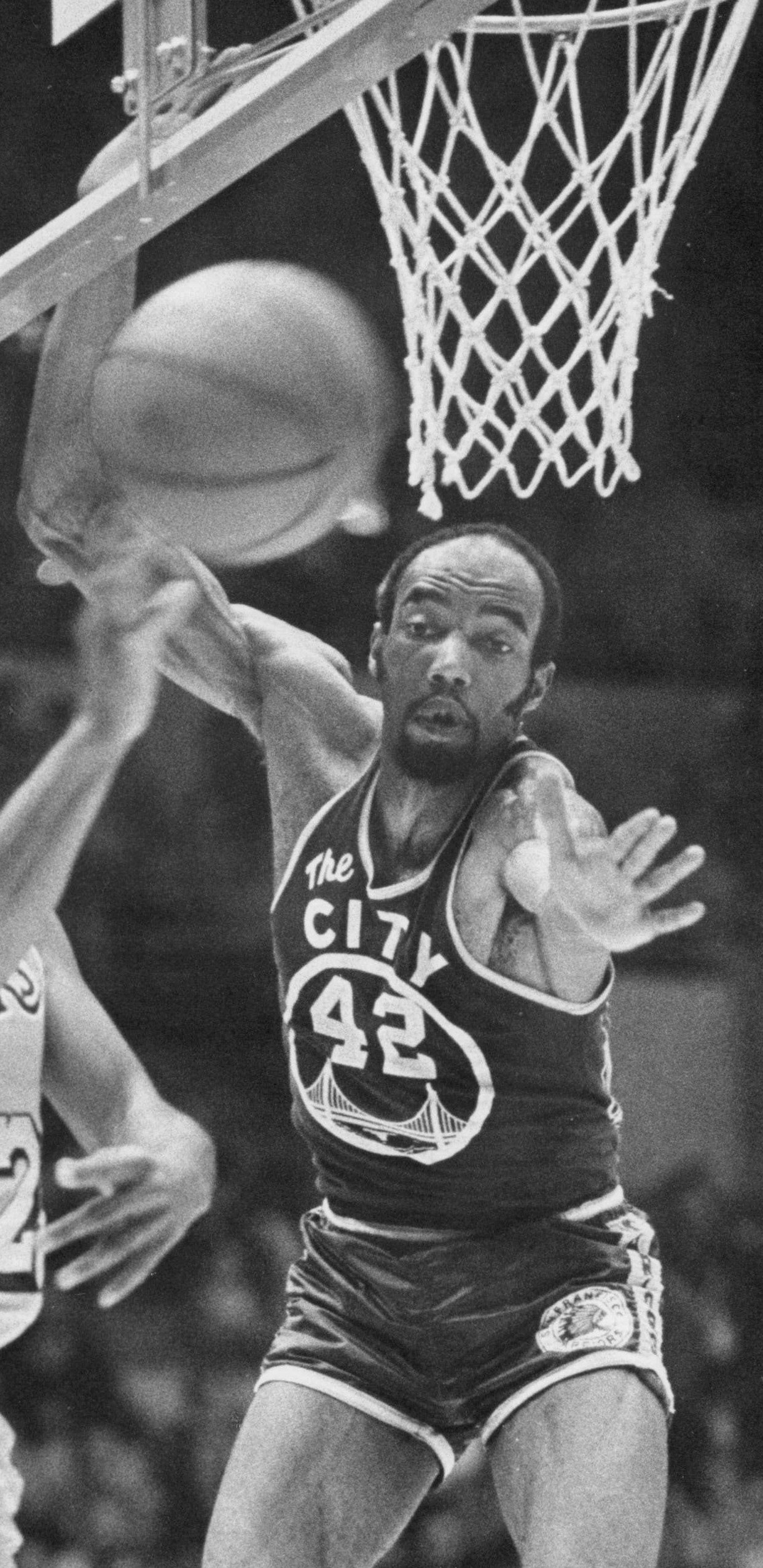
Nate Thurmond

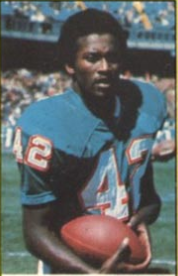
Paul Warfield

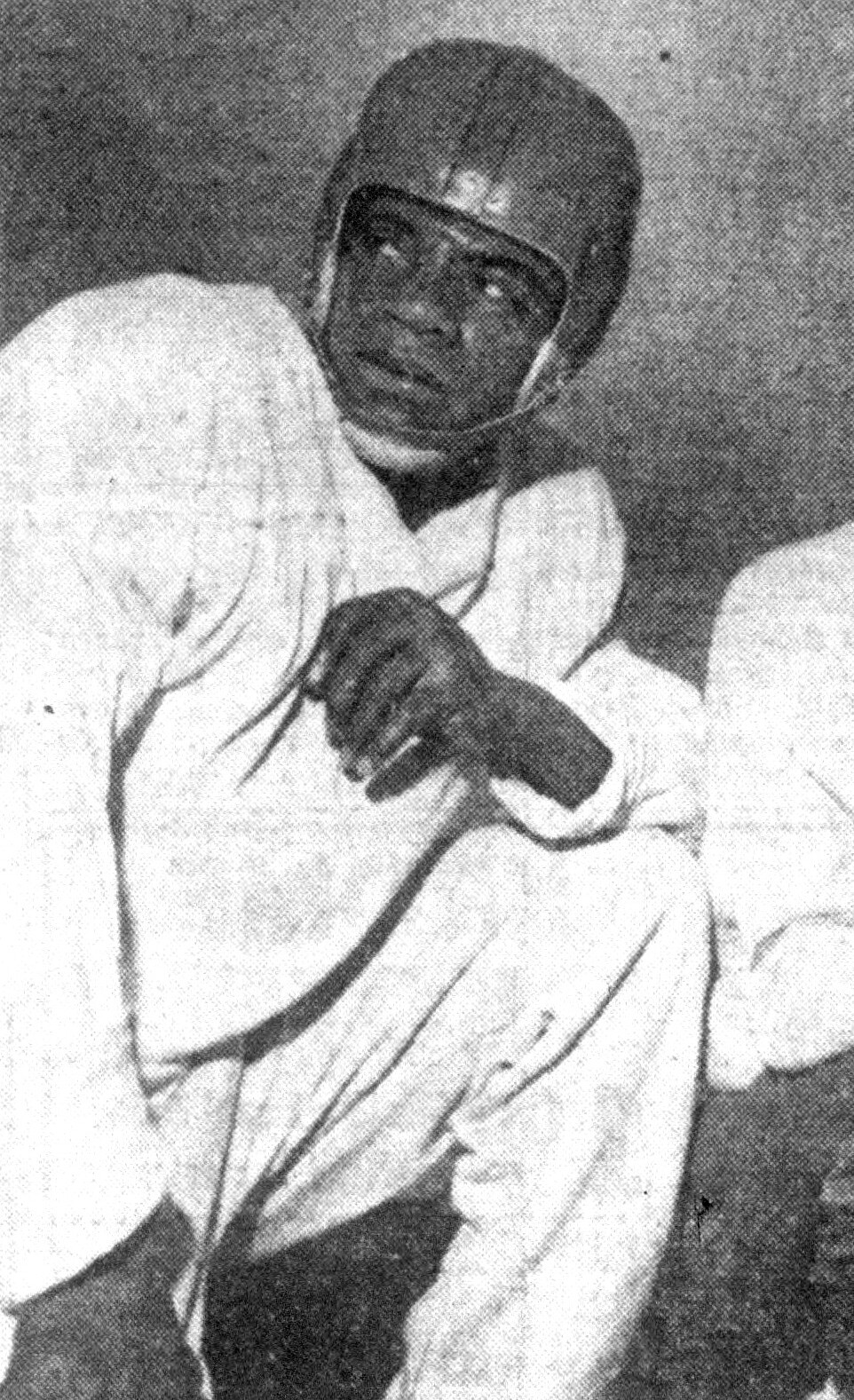
Bill Willis

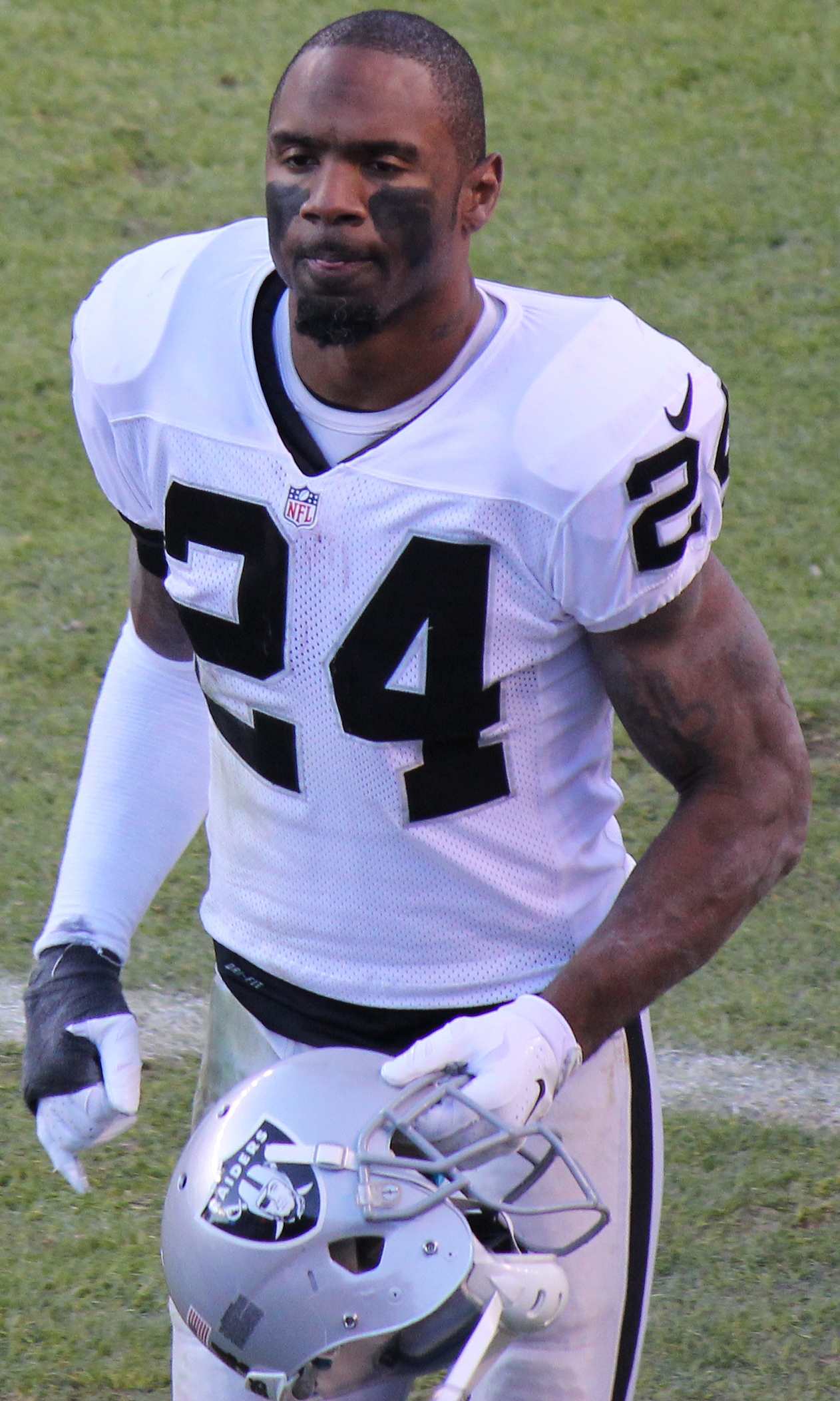
Charles Woodson

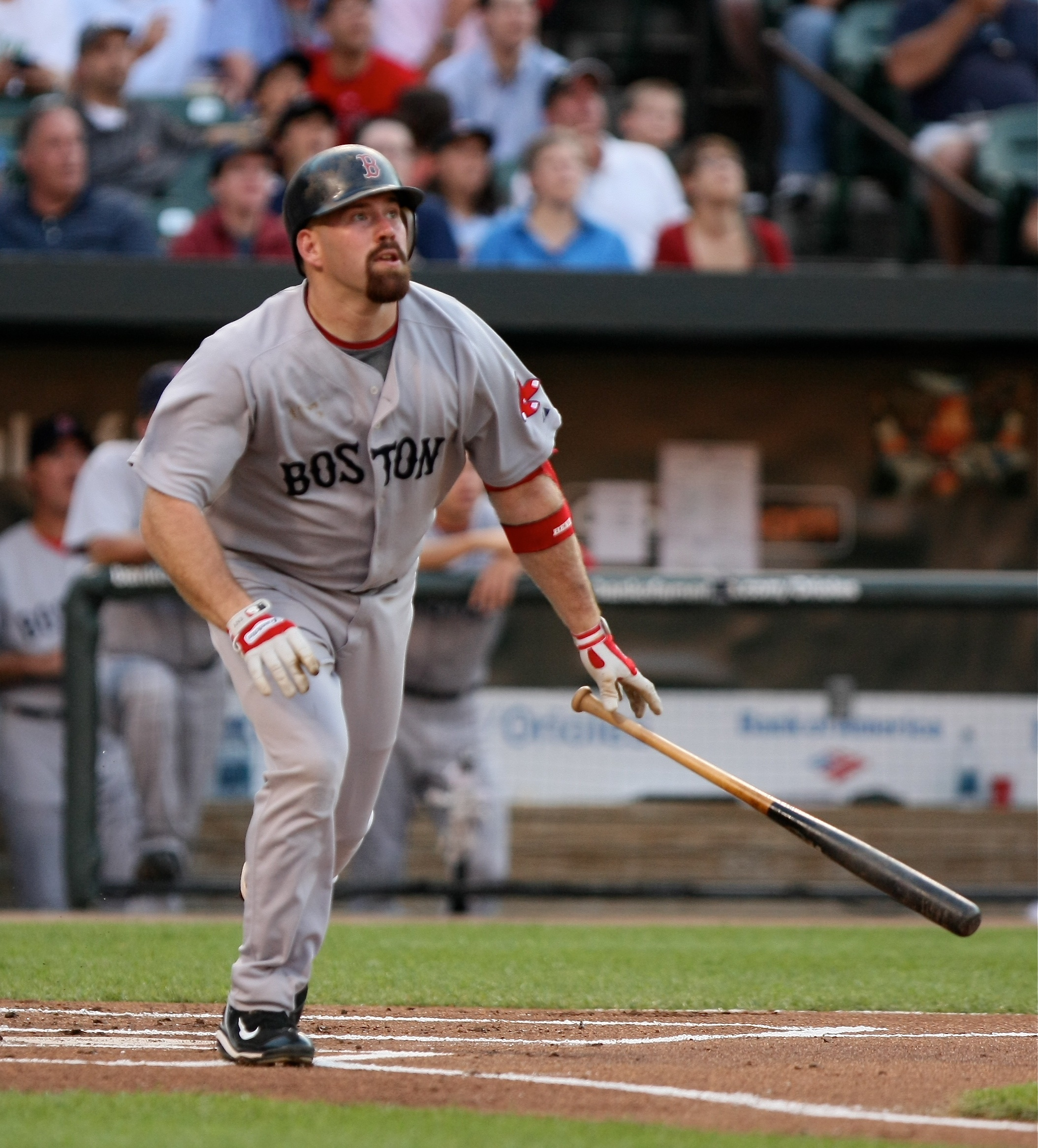
Kevin Youkilis

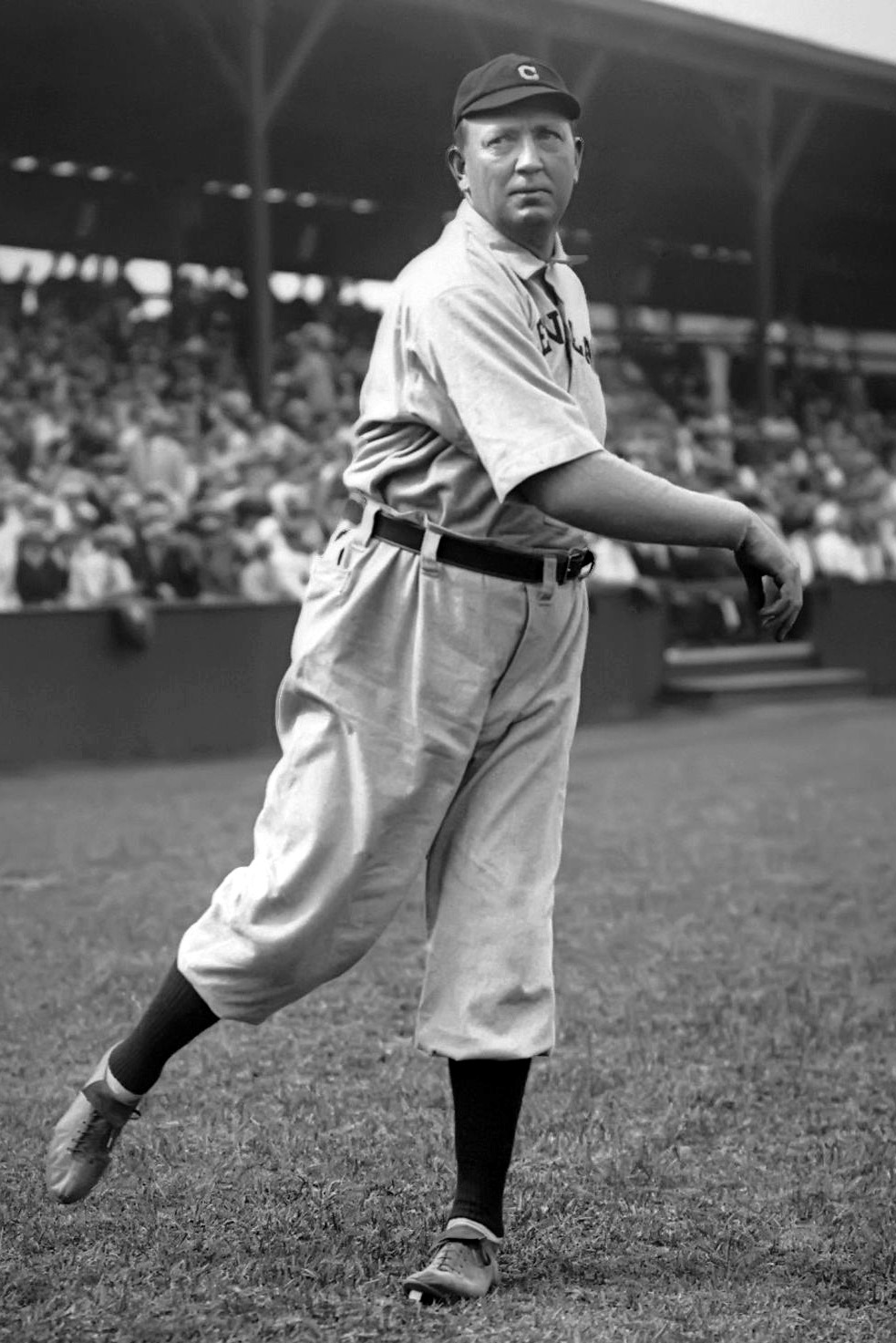
Cy Young

- Bill Talbert (tennis player) (Cincinnati)
- Aqib Talib (football player) (Cleveland)
- Ben Taylor (football player) (Bellaire)
- David Taylor (Olympic freestyle wrestler) (St. Paris)
- Kent Tekulve (baseball player) (Hamilton)
- Matt Tennant (football player) (Cincinnati)
- James Terry (basketball player) (Cleveland)
- Joe Thomasson (basketball player) (Dayton)
- LaSalle Thompson (basketball player, coach) (Cincinnati)
- Hugh Thornton (football player) (Oberlin)
- Joe Thuney (football player) (Centerville)
- Nate Thurmond (Hall of Fame basketball player) (Akron)
- Mike Tolbert (football player) (Centerville)
- Steve Tovar (football player) (Elyria)
- Tony Trabert (tennis player) (Cincinnati)
- Jim Tracy (baseball player, manager) (Hamilton)
- Ryan Travis (football player) (Massillon)
- Demetrius Treadwell (basketball player) (Cleveland)
- Gary Trent (basketball player) (Columbus)
- Jim Tressel (football coach) (Mentor)
- Lee Tressel (Hall of Fame college football coach) (Ada)
- Danny Trevathan (football player) (Youngstown)
- Mike Trgovac (football coach) (Youngstown)
- Mitchell Trubisky (football player) (Mentor)
- Mel Tucker (football coach) (Cleveland)
- Tyler Ulis (basketball player) (Lima)
- Brandon Underwood (football player) (Hamilton)
- Zach Veach (race car driver) (Stockdale)
- Louie Vito (snowboarder) (Bellefontaine)
- Doug Volmar (hockey player) (Cleveland)
- Joe Vosmik (baseball player) (Cleveland)
- Mike Vrabel (football player) (Akron)
- John Wager (football player) (Massillon)
- Neal Walk (basketball player) (Cleveland)
- Bill Walker (basketball player) (North College Hill)
- Moses Fleetwood Walker (baseball player) (Mount Pleasant)
- Randy Walker (football coach) (Troy)
- Vance Walker (football player) (Cincinnati)
- Spencer Ware (football player) (Cincinnati)
- Paul Warfield (football player) (Warren)
- Rau'shee Warren (boxer) (Cincinnati)
- Jimmy Wasdell (baseball player) (Cleveland)
- Nate Washington (football player) (Toledo)
- Darren Jason Watkins Jr. (online streamer) (Cincinnati)
- Nick Weatherspoon (basketball player) (Canton)
- Tom Weiskopf (golfer) (Massillon)
- Beanie Wells (football player) (Akron)
- Jayson Wells (basketball player) (Cleveland)
- Rick White (baseball player) (Springfield)
- Sheldon White (football player) (Dayton)
- Sol White (baseball player, manager, executive) (Bellaire)
- Donte Whitner (football player) (Cleveland)
- Matt Wilhelm (football player) (Lorain)
- Jeff Wilkins (football player) (Youngstown)
- Herb Williams (basketball player, coach) (Columbus)
- Jawad Williams (basketball player) (Cleveland)
- Bill Willis (Hall of Fame football player) (Columbus)
- Russell Wilson (football player) (Cincinnati)
- Mike Windt (football player) (Cincinnati)
- Antoine Winfield (football player) (Akron)
- Antoine Winfield Jr. (football player) (Columbus)
- J.J. Wise (football manager) (Massillon)
- Matt Wisler (baseball player) (Bryan)
- Derek Wolfe (football player) (Lisbon)
- Alex Wood (football coach) (Massillon)
- Eric Wood (football player) (Cincinnati)
- Gene Woodling (baseball player) (Akron)
- Charles Woodson (football player) (Fremont)
- Chris Wormley (football player) (Toledo)
- Chris Wright (basketball player) (Trotwood)
- Mike Wright (football player) (Cincinnati)
- Kevin Youkilis (baseball player) (Cincinnati)
- Cy Young (baseball player) (Gilmore)
- Dolph Ziggler (professional wrestler) (Cleveland)
- Don Zimmer (baseball player, coach) (Cincinnati)
- Ron Zook (football coach) (Loudonville)
- Michael Zordich (football player) (Youngstown)

== Journalists, writers, cartoonists, poets, authors, playwrights, screenwriters, film directors, and producers ==
A–F

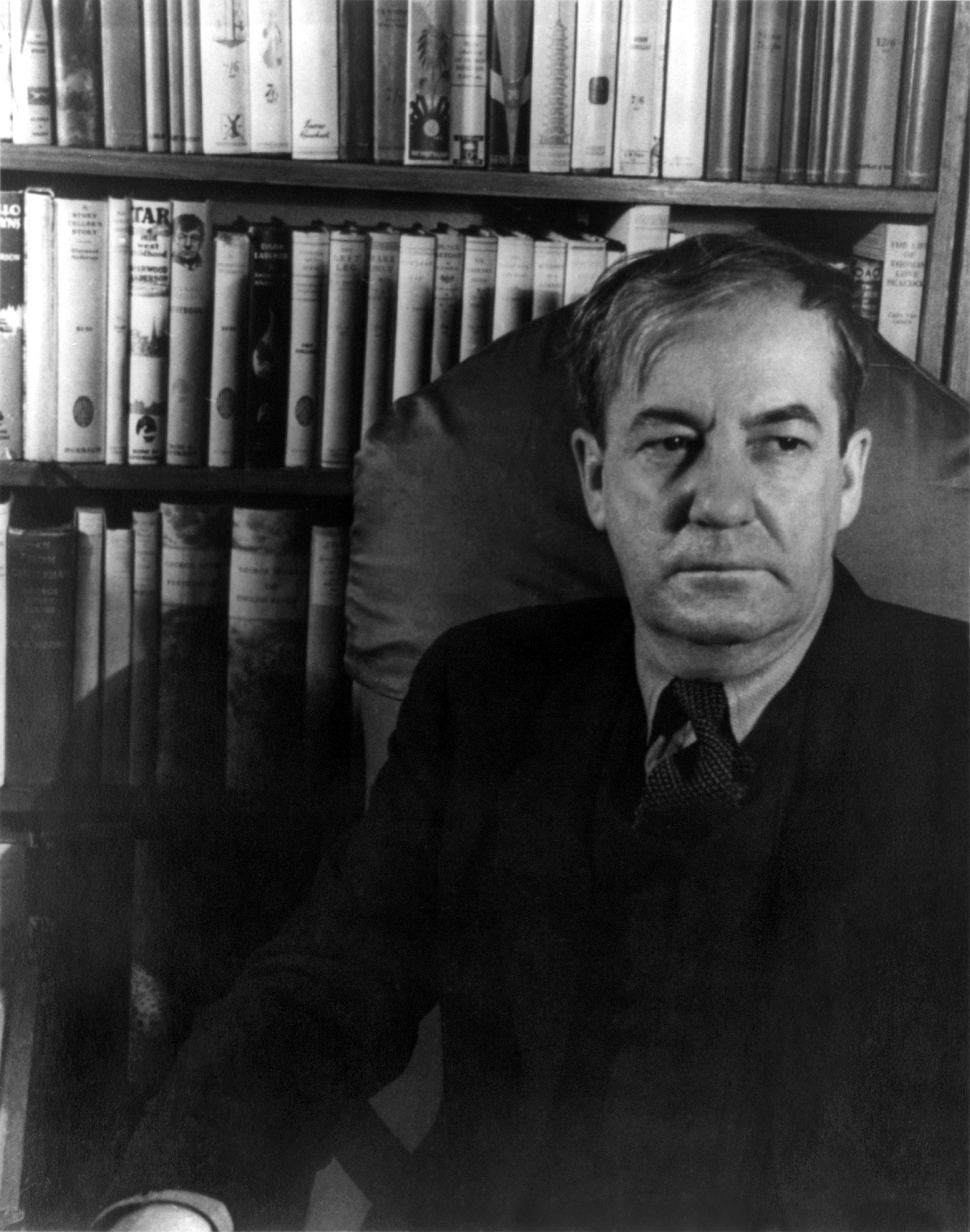
Sherwood Anderson

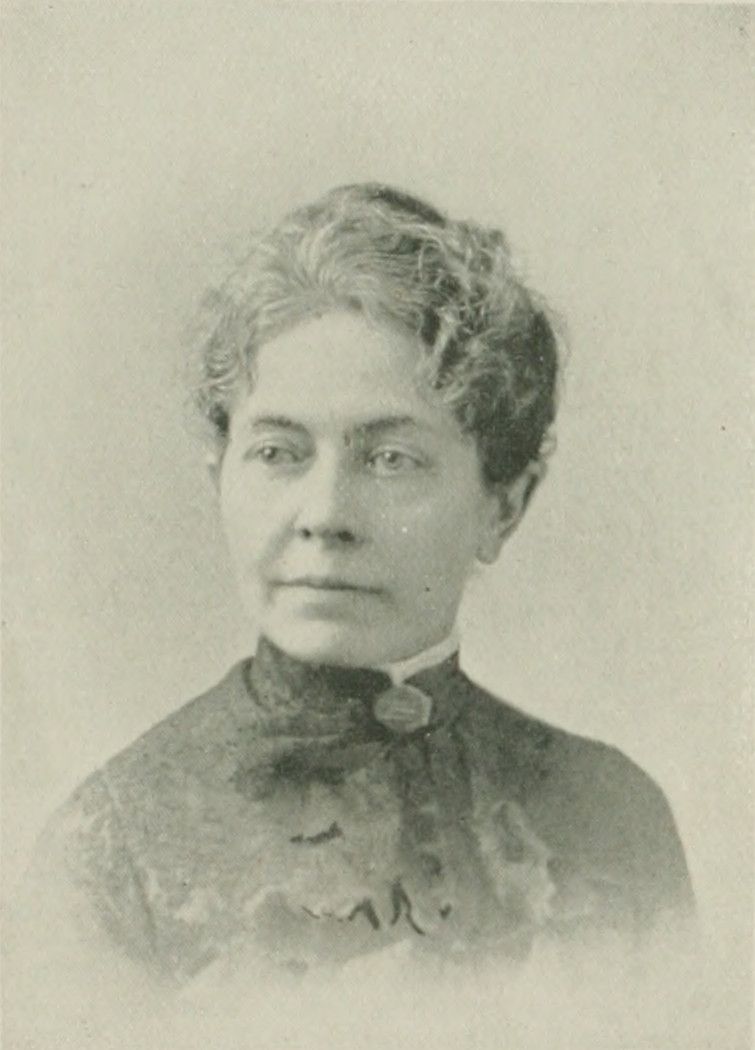
Margret Holmes Bates

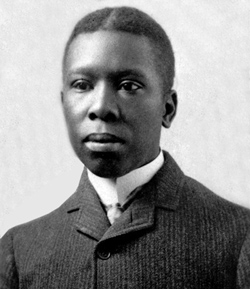
Paul Laurence Dunbar

- Berenice Abbott (photographer) (Springfield)
- Karen Ackerman (author) (Cincinnati)
- Julia Carter Aldrich (author, editor) (Liverpool)
- Dede Allen (film editor) (Cleveland)
- Eunice Gibbs Allyn (author) (Brecksville)
- Sherwood Anderson (author) (Camden/Clyde)
- R. W. Apple Jr. (journalist and author) (Akron)
- Helen Vickroy Austin (journalist, horticulturist) (Miamisburg)
- Brian Azzarello (comic book writer) (Cleveland)
- Jamie Babbit (film director, producer, screenwriter) (Shaker Heights)
- Libbie C. Riley Baer (poet) (Bethel)
- Bill Balas (screenwriter and director) (Cleveland)
- Robert Banks (director) (Cleveland)
- Melissa Elizabeth Banta (poet) (Cheviot)
- Natalie Barney (author) (Dayton)
- Dorothy Barresi (poet) (Akron)
- Margret Holmes Bates (author) (Fremont)
- Tom Batiuk (cartoonist) (Akron)
- William Bayer (crime fiction author) (Cleveland)
- Brian Michael Bendis (comic book writer) (Cleveland)
- Ambrose Bierce (author) (Meigs County)
- Hanne Blank (author) (Cleveland)
- Erma Bombeck (newspaper columnist, author) (Dayton)
- Christine Brennan (sportswriter) (Toledo)
- Douglas Brinkley (author and professor) (Perrysburg)
- Louis Bromfield (author) (Mansfield)
- Raymond Buckland (author) (Warren)
- Michael Buckley (author) (Akron)
- Milton Caniff (cartoonist) (Dayton)
- Steven Caple Jr. (director) (Cleveland)
- Vincent J. Cardinal (playwright and director) (Kent)
- Alice Cary (poet) (Cincinnati)
- Charles Chesnutt (writer) (Cleveland)
- Gordon Cobbledick (sports editor, author, war correspondent) (Cleveland)
- Bud Collins (journalist) (Lima)
- Gail Collins (journalist) (Cincinnati)
- Chris Columbus (film director) (Warren)
- Eliza Archard Conner (journalist, lecturer) (Monroe Township)
- Jerome Corsi (author) (East Cleveland)
- Carol Costello (television correspondent) (Minerva)
- Hart Crane (poet) (Garrettsville)
- Wes Craven (film director) (Cleveland)
- Anne Virginia Culbertson (writer) (Zanesville)
- Michael Cunningham (author) (Cincinnati)
- Steve Curwood (journalist, author) (Yellow Springs)
- William H. Daniels (cinematographer) (Cleveland)
- Khashyar Darvich (film producer, director) (Oxford, Cleveland)
- Stephen Donaldson (author) (Cleveland)
- Rita Dove (poet) (Akron)
- Elizabeth Drew (journalist, author) (Cincinnati)
- Paul Laurence Dunbar (poet) (Dayton)
- Jane Dunnewold (author) (Oberlin)
- Harlan Ellison (author) (Cleveland)
- Mel Epstein (film producer) (Dayton)
- Joe Eszterhas (screenwriter) (Cleveland)
- Dominick Evans (filmmaker/activist) (Toledo)
- Lydia Hoyt Farmer (author, women's rights activist) (Cleveland)
- George Fett (cartoonist) (Cleveland)

G–M

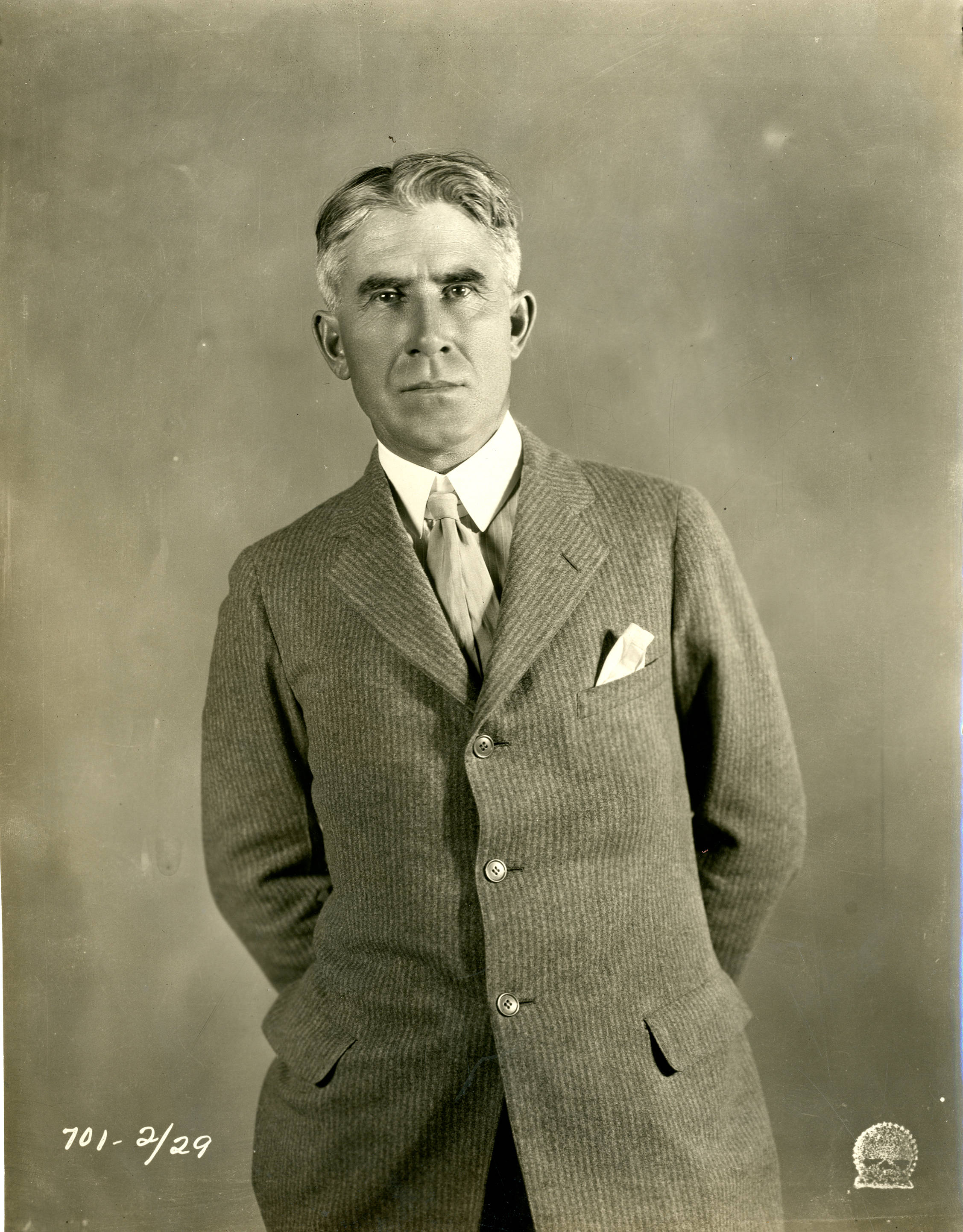
Zane Grey

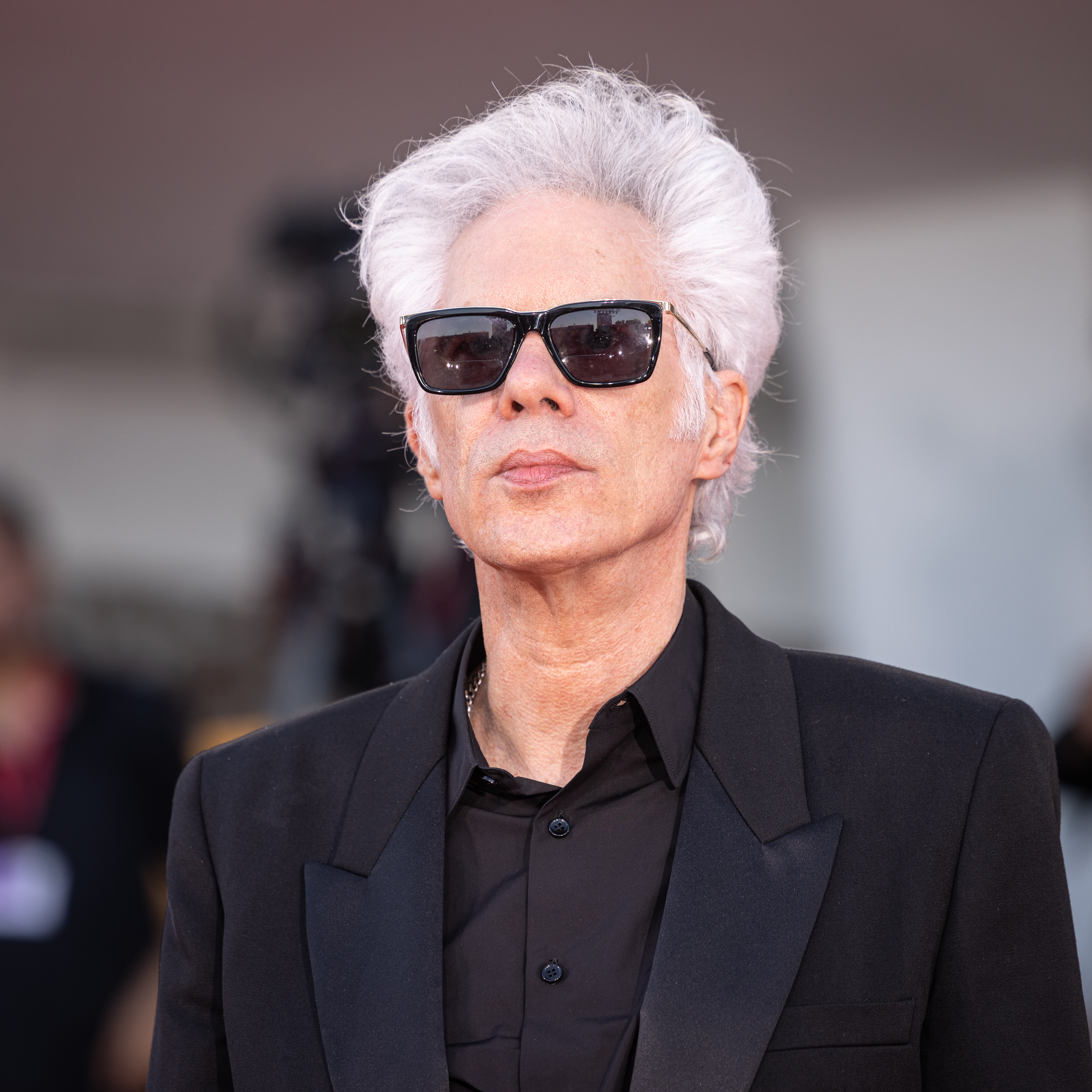
Jim Jarmusch

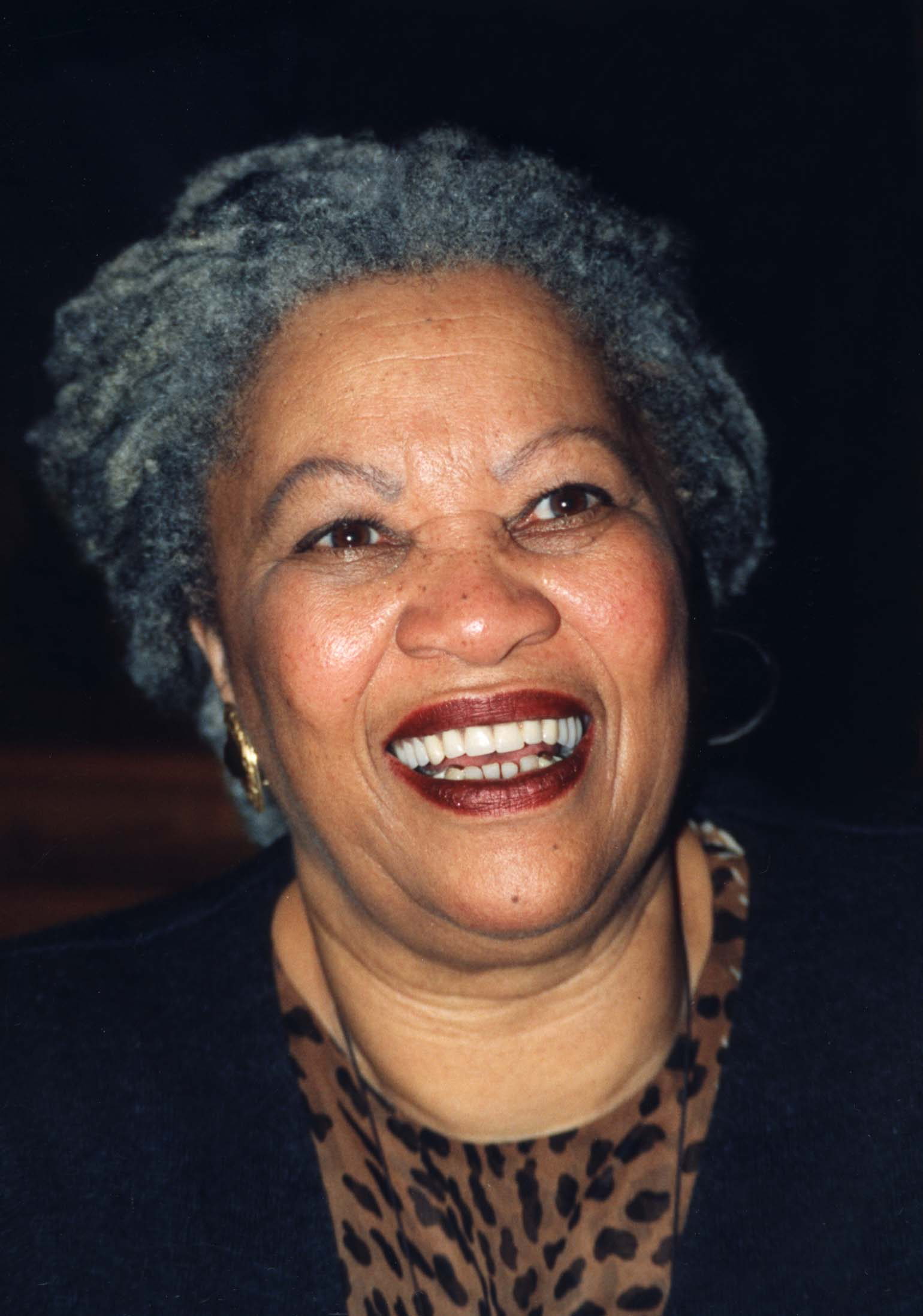
Toni Morrison

- Atul Gawande (journalist, physician) (Athens)
- Elizabeth George (novelist) (Warren)
- Paul Gilger (playwright, set designer, architect) (Mansfield)
- Florence Magruder Gilmore (religious writer, novelist, translator) (Columbus)
- Steve Gordon (screenwriter and film director (Arthur))
- Bob Greene (columnist, author) (Columbus)
- Zane Grey (author) (Zanesville)
- Cathy Guisewite (cartoonist) (Dayton)
- Stephen Gyllenhaal (film director, poet) (Cleveland)
- Margaret Peterson Haddix (author) (Columbus)
- Virginia Hamilton (children's author) (Yellow Springs)
- Benjamin Hanby (writer, composer) (Rushville, Westerville)
- Bill Hemmer (television journalist) (Cincinnati)
- William Dean Howells (author, critic)
- Elizabeth O. Sampson Hoyt (philosopher, author) (Athens)
- Langston Hughes (poet) (Cleveland)
- Florence Huntley (journalist, author and humorist) (Alliance)
- Margaret E. Ingalls (author, liturgist) (Logan)
- Mary Bigelow Ingham (writer, educator, social activist) (Mansfield)
- Jeff Jacoby (journalist) (Cleveland)
- Jim Jarmusch (film director) (Akron)
- Douglas Kenney (comedy writer, actor) (Chagrin Falls)
- Joe Kernen (television journalist) (Cincinnati)
- Katharine Kerr (sci-fi/fantasy author) (Cleveland)
- Glenn Kessler (correspondent) (Cincinnati)
- Eric Kripke (writer, director) (Toledo)
- Robert Kurtzman (film director, screenwriter) (Crestline)
- Jerome Lawrence (writer) (Cleveland)
- Robert E. Lee (writer) (Elyria)
- Sorche Nic Leodhas (writer) (Youngstown)
- Brett Leonard (film director) (Toledo)
- Mark L. Lester (film director) (Cleveland)
- Ann Liguori (radio personality) (Cincinnati)
- Dwight H. Little (director) (Cleveland)
- Carmen LoBue (filmmaker) (Cleveland)
- Januarius MacGahan (journalist) (New Lexington)
- Bryan Malessa (author) (Chagrin Falls)
- Louise Markscheffel (newspaper editor and critic) (Toledo)
- Lida Rose McCabe (author, journalist, lecturer) (Columbus)
- J. E. McConaughy (litterateur, author) (Twinsburg)
- Jennie McCowen (physician, medical journal editor) (Harveysburg)
- Robin Meade (television journalist) (New London)
- Nick G. Miller (screenwriter, producer, director) (Dayton)
- Dan Moldea (author) (Akron)
- Christopher Moore (author) (Toledo)
- Patt Morrison (journalist) (Utica)
- Toni Morrison (author) (Lorain)

N–Z

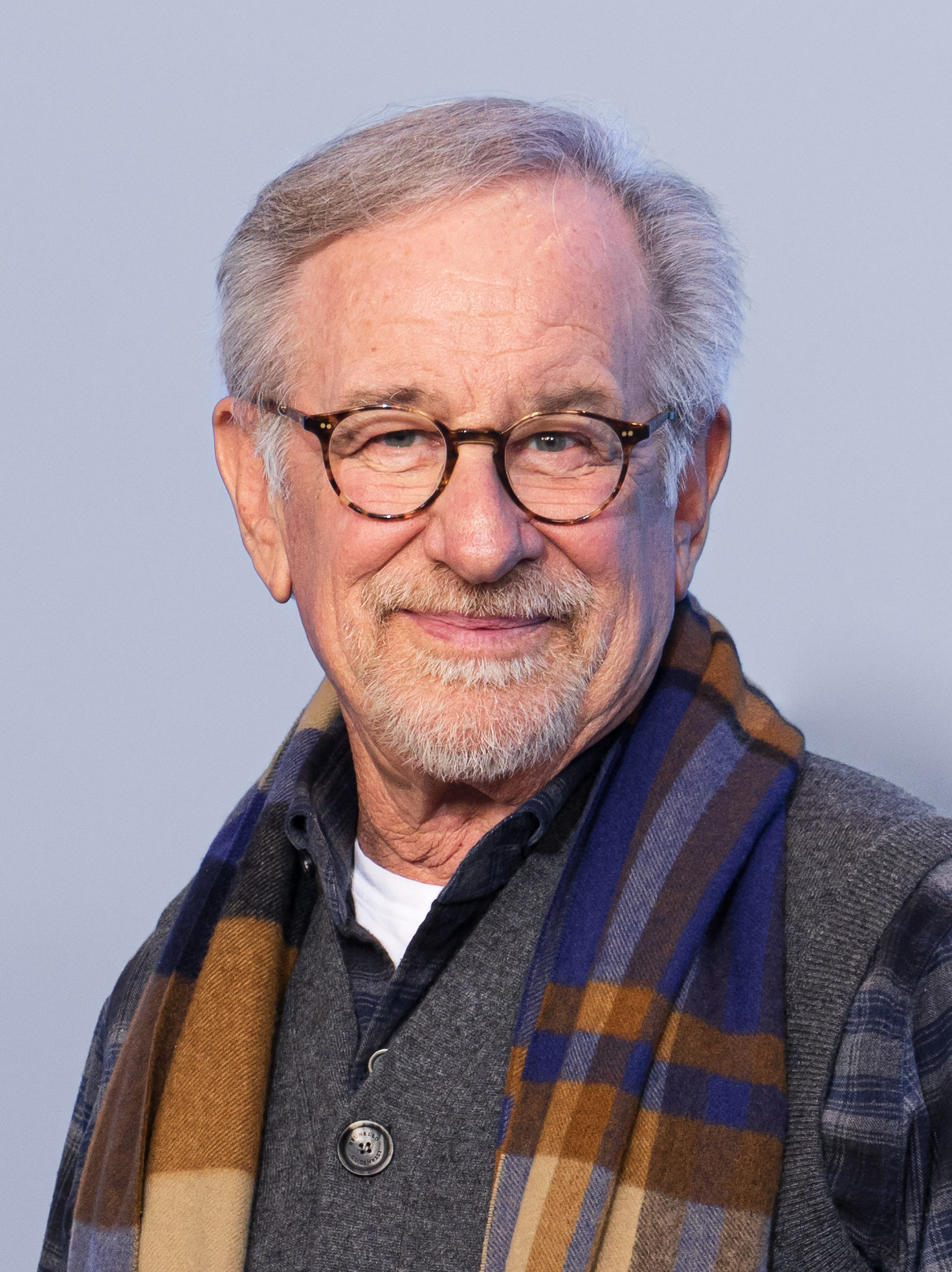
Steven Spielberg

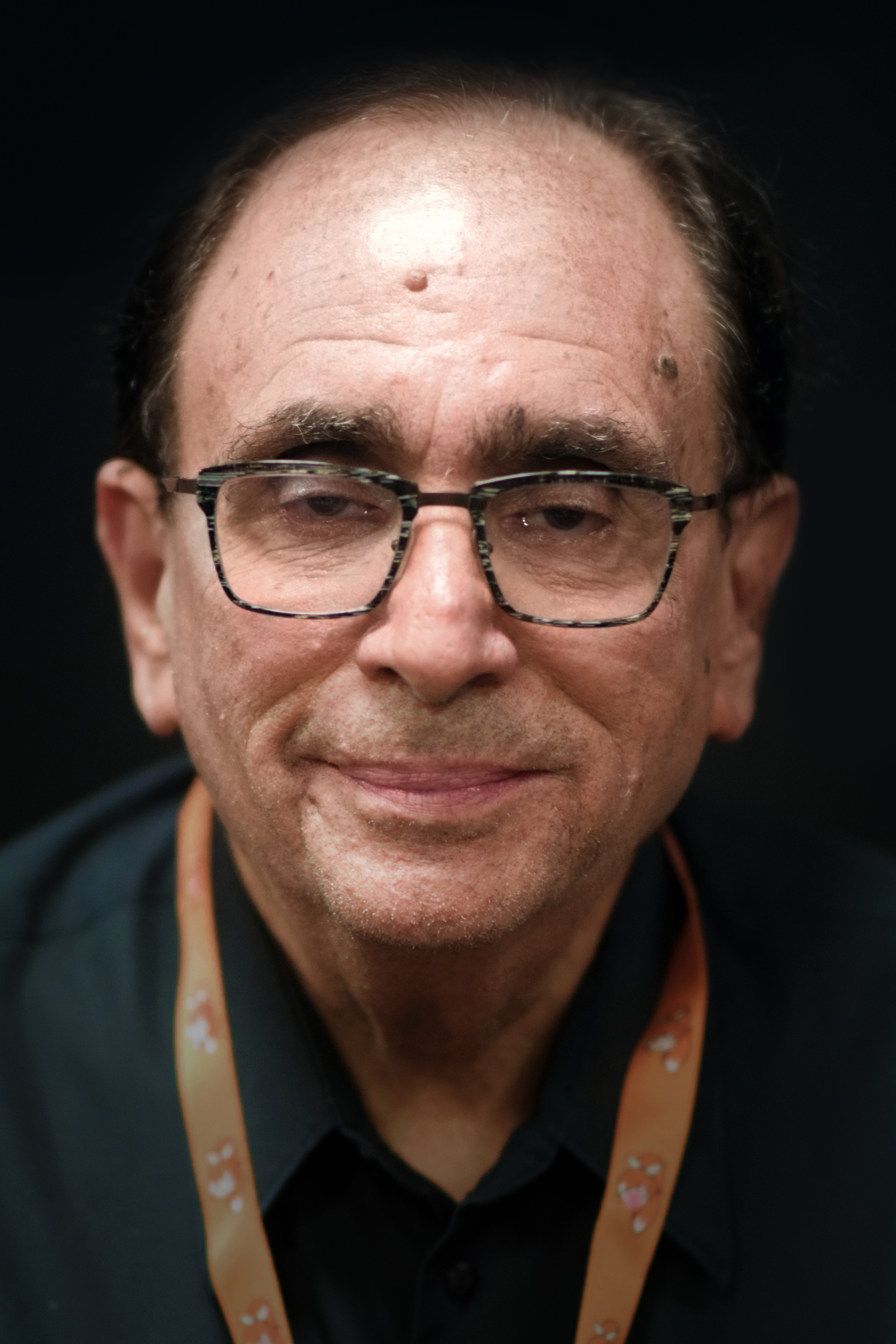
R. L. Stine

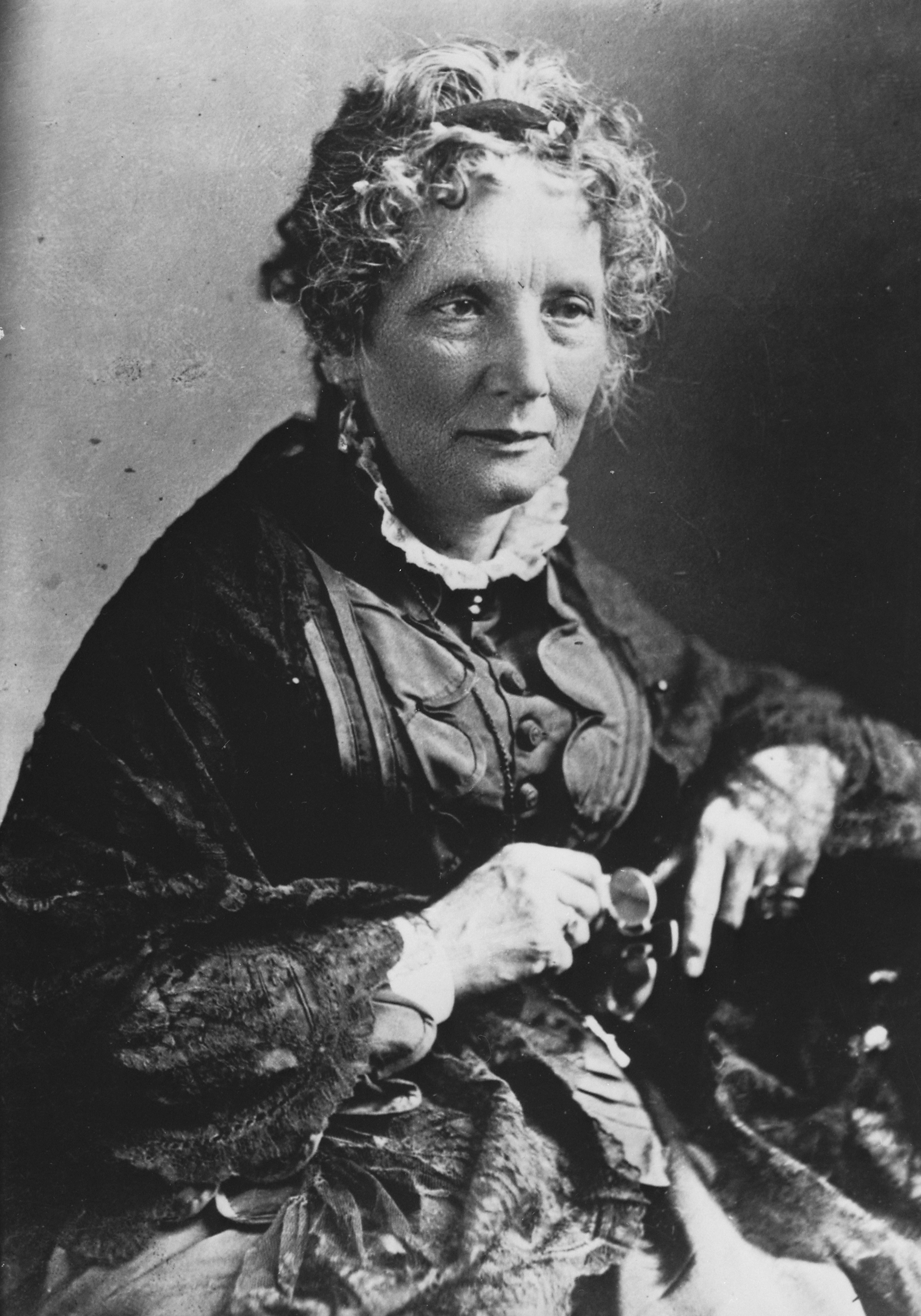
Harriet Beecher Stowe

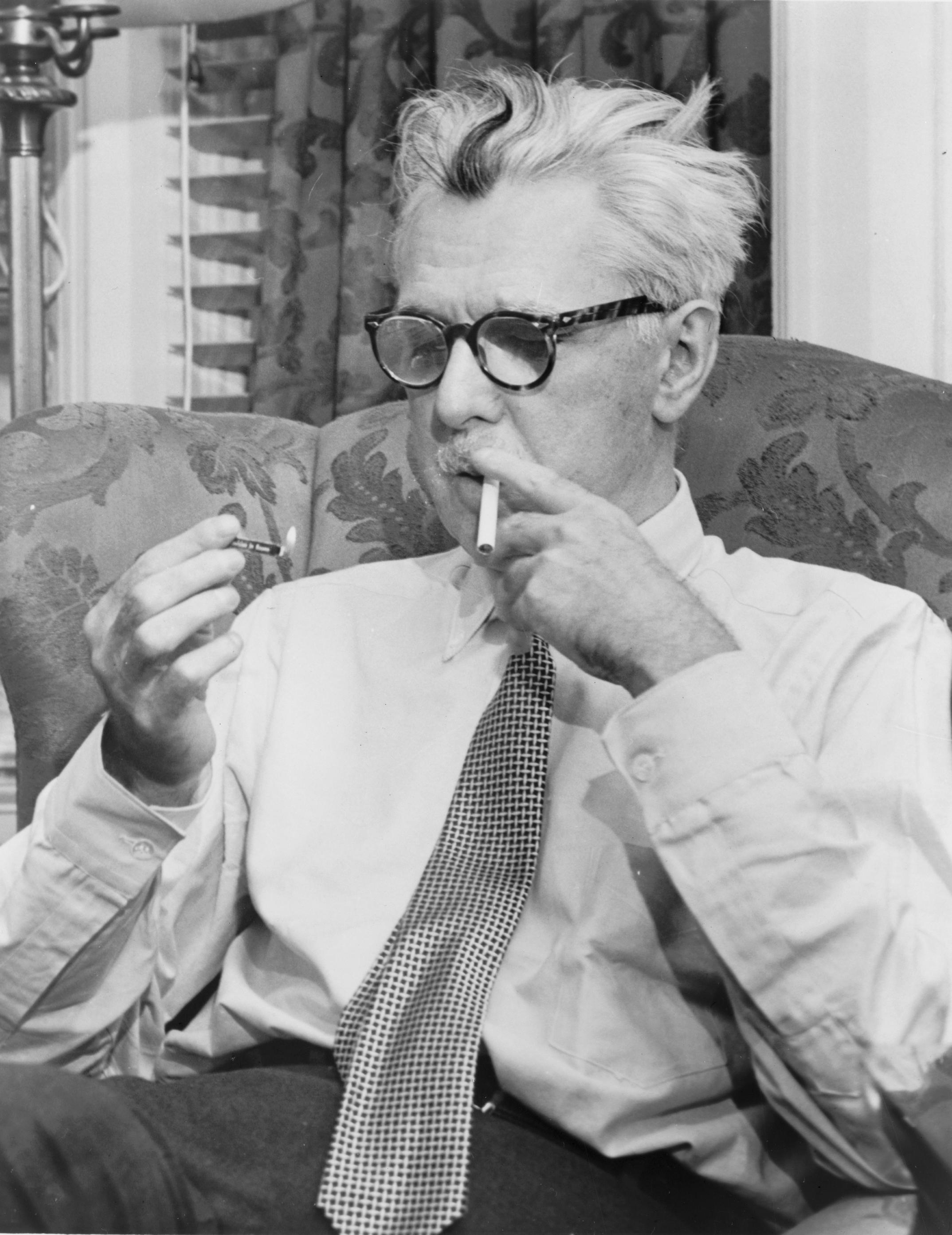
James Thurber

- Dudley Nichols (screenwriter) (Wapakoneta)
- Andre Norton (author) (Cleveland)
- John O'Brien (novelist) (Oxford)
- Frederick Burr Opper (cartoonist) (Madison)
- P. J. O'Rourke (political satirist, author) (Toledo)
- Paul Palnik (artist, cartoonist) (Cleveland)
- Wayland Maxfield Parrish, professor of rhetoric and writer
- Harvey Pekar (author) (Cleveland)
- Jack Perkins (journalist, author) (Cleveland)
- Eleanor Perry (screenwriter) (Cleveland)
- Bob Peterson (animator, director) (Wooster/Dover)
- Christopher Pfaff (producer, actor, clothing designer) (Akron)
- Dav Pilkey (author) (Cleveland)
- David Pogue (columnist) (Shaker Heights)
- Dawn Powell (author) (Mount Gilead)
- Ted Rall (editorial cartoonist) (Kettering)
- Ellen Ratner (Fox News analyst) (Cleveland)
- Robert Rehme (film producer) (Cincinnati)
- Rosella Rice (writer, poet) (Perrysville)
- Les Roberts (author) (Cleveland Heights)
- Effie Hoffman Rogers (editor, journalist, educator) (Jackson)
- Terry Ryan (author) (Defiance)
- Bill Sammon (television journalist) (Cleveland)
- Martin Savidge (television journalist) (Rocky River)
- John Scalzi (author) (Bradford)
- Tara Seibel (artist, cartoonist) (Pepper Pike)
- Dominic Sena (film director) (Niles)
- Joe Shuster (co-creator of Superman) (Cleveland)
- Jerry Siegel (co-creator of Superman) (Cleveland)
- Marisa Silver (film director) (Shaker Heights)
- David C. Smith (novelist) (Youngstown)
- Jeff Smith (cartoonist) (Columbus)
- Maggie Smith (poet, freelance writer, and editor)
- Tony Snow (television journalist) (Cincinnati)
- Steven Spielberg (film director, producer) (Cincinnati)
- Cornelia Laws St. John (poet, biographer) (College Hill)
- R. L. Stine (author) (Columbus)
- Harriet Beecher Stowe (author) (Cincinnati)
- Gertrude Strohm (author, compiler, game designer) (Greene County)
- Angeline Teal (poet, novelist, short story writer) (Wooster)
- Lowell Thomas (commentator, author) (Woodington)
- James Thurber (author, cartoonist) (Columbus)
- George Trendle (radio/TV producer) (Norwalk)
- Emma Rood Tuttle (writer, poet) (Braceville Township)
- Lee Unkrich (film director and editor) (Cleveland)
- Michael Wadleigh (film director) (Akron)
- Paula Wagner (film producer) (Youngstown)
- Brad Warner (author) (Akron)
- Jack L. Warner (movie mogul) (Youngstown)
- Marion E. Warner (writer) (Geneva)
- Harvey Wasserman (author, political activist) (Columbus)
- Lew Wasserman (studio executive) (Cleveland)
- Daniel Waters (screenwriter) (Cleveland)
- Bill Watterson (cartoonist) (Chagrin Falls)
- Sharon Waxman (born c. 1963) (journalist)
- Laura Rosamond White (author, poet, editor) (Geneva)
- David Whitney (author) (Youngstown)
- Gerri Willis (television journalist) (Cincinnati)
- M. Wintermute (poet, author) (Berkshire)
- Charles Woodson (football) (Fremont)
- James Wright (poet) (Martins Ferry)
- John Yang (television journalist) (Chillicothe)

== Politicians, public servants, public officeholders ==
A–L

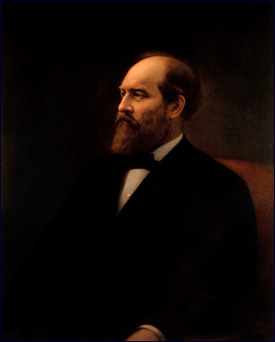
James A. Garfield

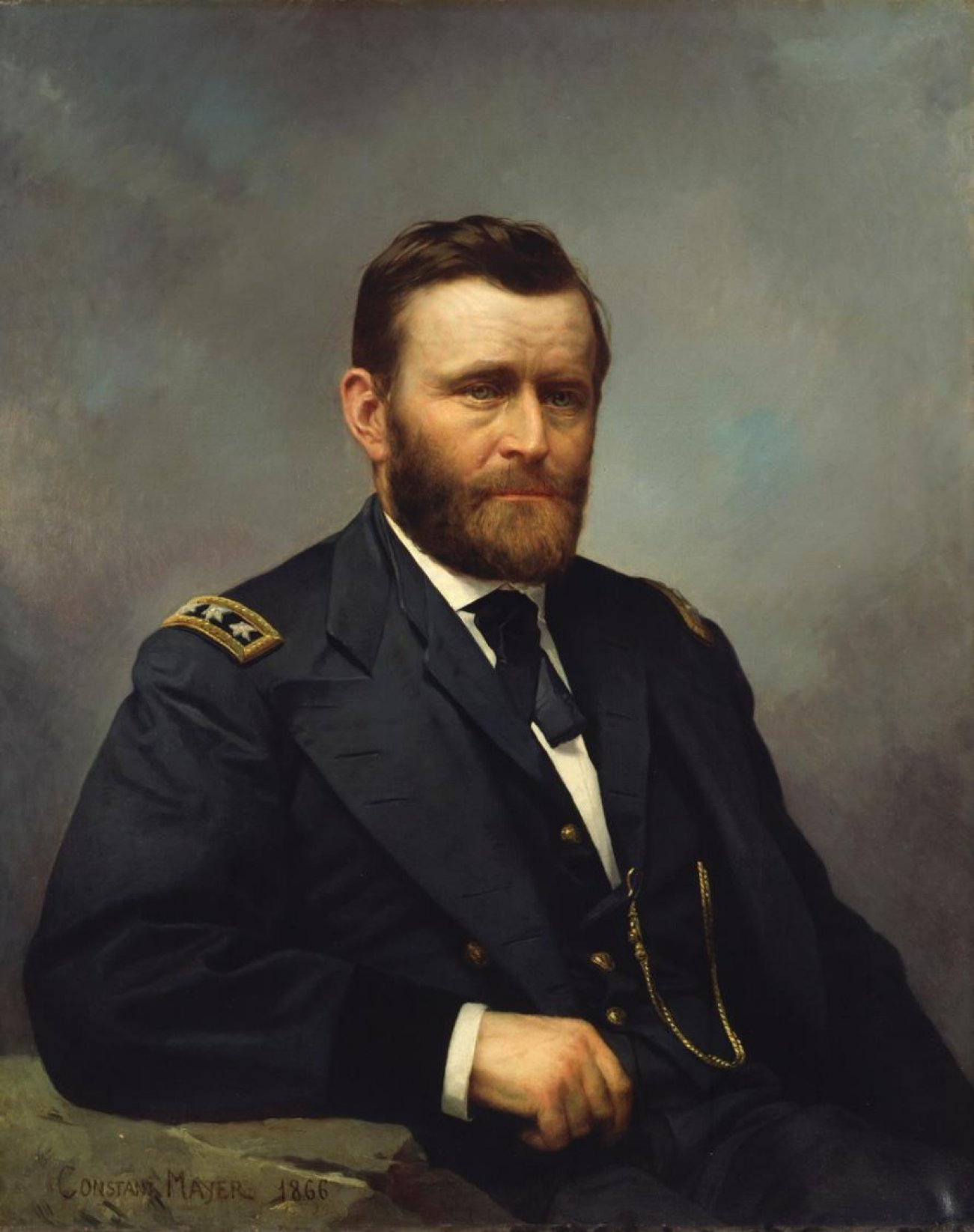
Ulysses S. Grant

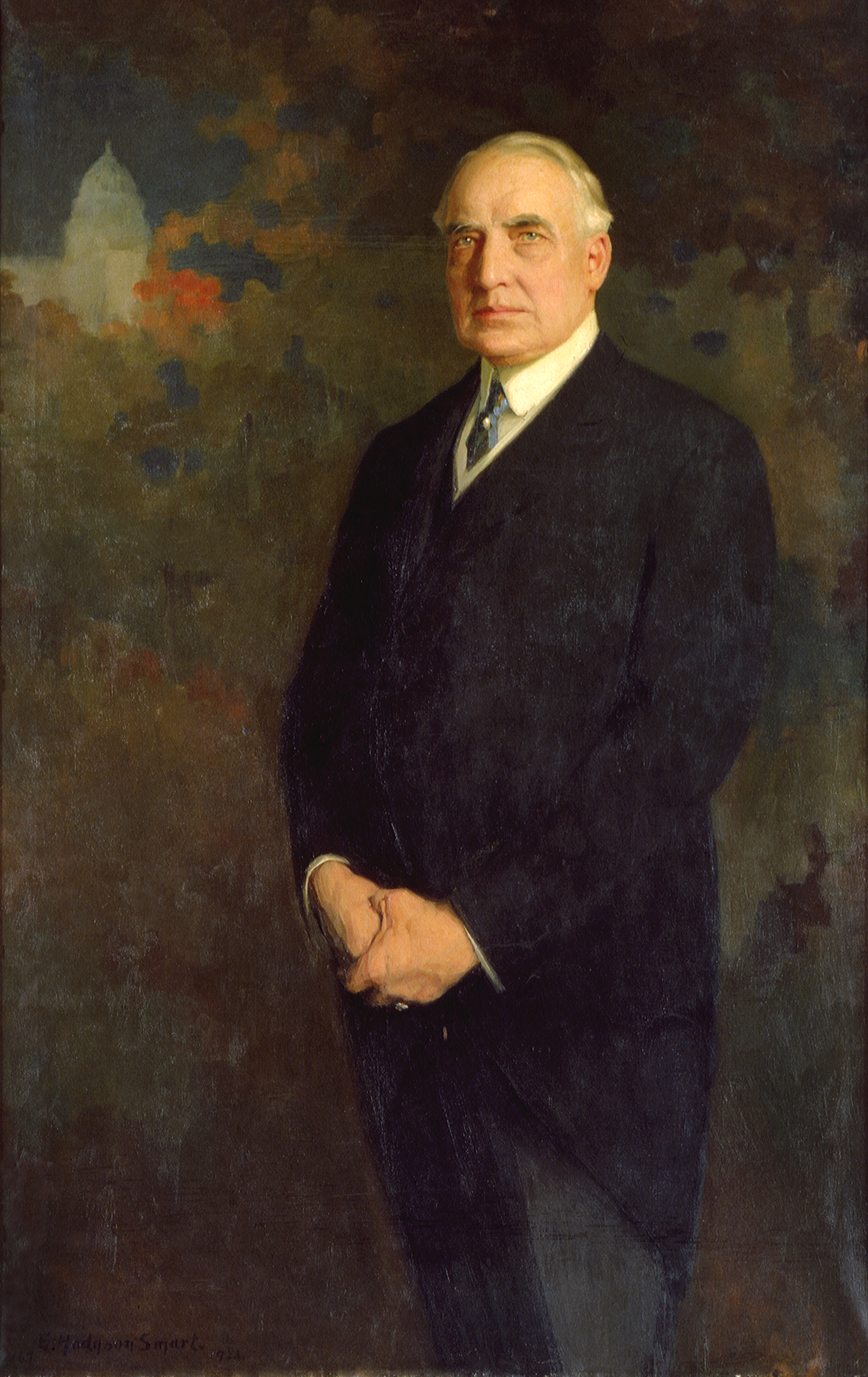
Warren G. Harding

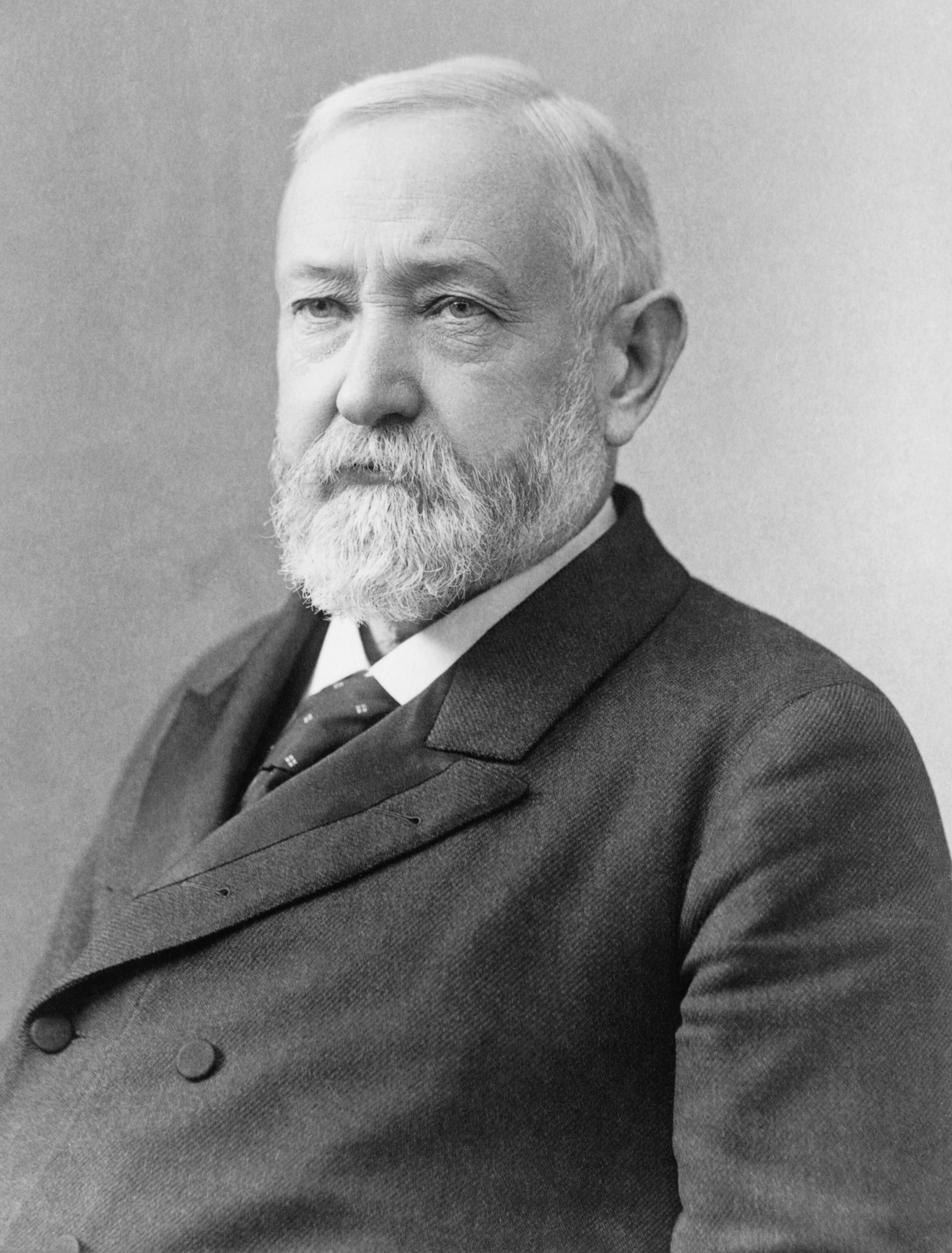
Benjamin Harrison

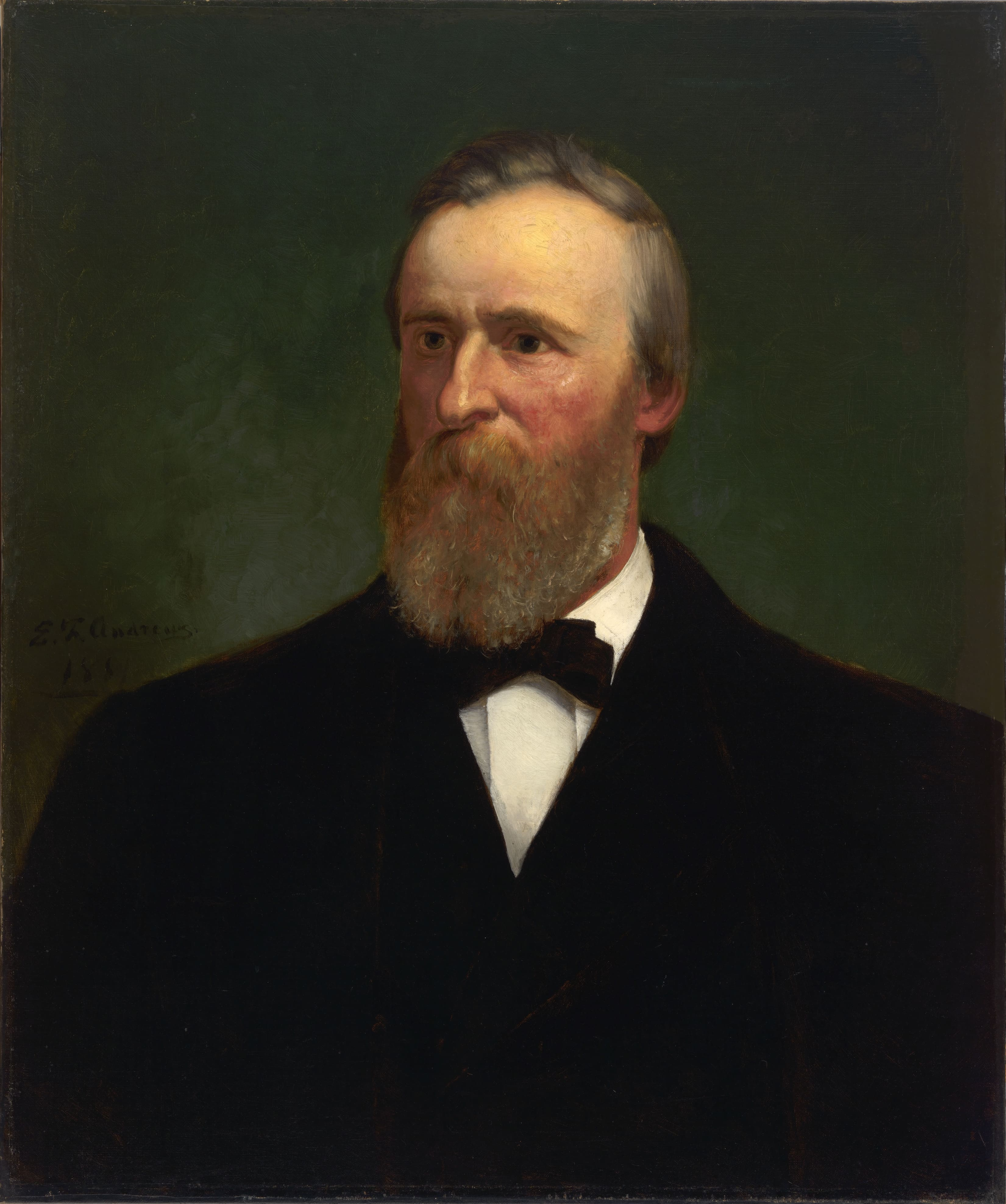
Rutherford B. Hayes

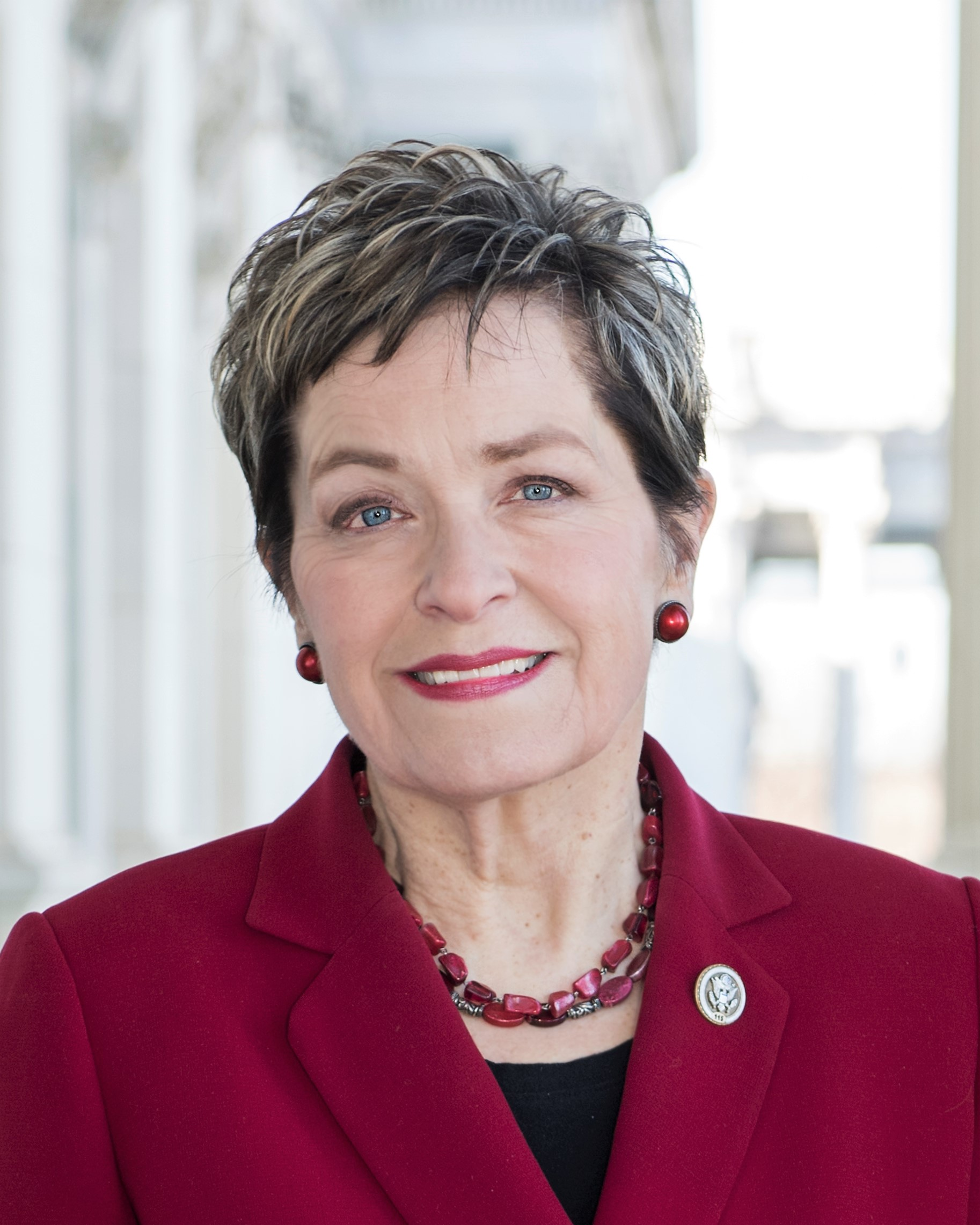
Marcy Kaptur

- Charles Anderson (Ohio governor) (Dayton)
- Frank J. Battisti (judge, U.S. District Court for the Northern District of Ohio) (Youngstown)
- Albert J. Beveridge (political leader) (Highland)
- Ken Blackwell (politician) (Cincinnati)
- Blue Jacket (Shawnee Indian chief) (presently known as Ross County)
- John Boehner (U.S. speaker of the House) (Reading/West Chester)
- John Brough (politician, Ohio governor) (Marietta)
- Henry Lawrence Burnett (prosecutor in trial for Abraham Lincoln assassination) (Youngstown)
- Prescott Bush (U.S. senator, businessman) (Columbus)
- William Case (Cleveland)
- Steve Chabot (politician, U.S. representative) (Cincinnati)
- Salmon P. Chase (Ohio governor, abolitionist, U.S. Treasury secretary and chief justice) (Cincinnati)
- Gary Cohn (National Economic Council director) (Shaker Heights)
- James M. Cox (governor, presidential candidate, media mogul) (Dayton)
- Ephraim Cutler (a framer of Ohio Constitution, abolitionist, longtime Ohio University trustee) (Ames Twp)
- Charles G. Dawes (politician)
- William R. Day (US Supreme Court justice) (Ravenna/Canton)
- John Dean (White House counsel to President Nixon) (Akron)
- R. Michael DeWine (politician, U.S. senator) (Cedarville)
- Steve Driehaus (politician, U.S. representative) (Cincinnati)
- James A. Garfield (Civil War general, 20th president of the United States) (Moreland Hills)
- James Rudolph Garfield (U.S. interior secretary)
- John J. Gilligan (politician, Ohio governor)
- John Glenn (U.S. senator, astronaut)
- Bill Gradison (politician, U.S. representative)
- Ulysses S. Grant (soldier, politician, 18th president of the United States) (Point Pleasant)
- Joe Hagin (White House deputy chief of staff) (Indian Hill)
- Warren G. Harding (29th president of the United States) (Blooming Grove/Caledonia)
- Marie Harf (State Dept. spokesperson) (Granville)
- Andrew L. Harris (Civil War general, U.S. commissioner, Ohio governor)
- Benjamin Harrison (soldier, politician, 23rd president of the United States) (North Bend)
- William Henry Harrison (soldier, politician, 9th president of the United States) (North Bend)
- Rutherford B. Hayes (politician, 19th president of the United States) (Delaware)
- Dave Hobson (politician, U.S. representative) (Springfield)
- Darrell Issa (politician, U.S. representative) (Cleveland)
- Nathaniel R. Jones (judge, U.S. Court of Appeals, Sixth Circuit) (Youngstown)
- Marcy Kaptur (politician, U.S. representative) (Toledo)
- John Kasich (politician, former representative from Ohio (1983–2001), and former governor of Ohio) (Pittsburgh/Columbus)
- Michael J. Kirwan (politician, U.S. representative) (Youngstown)
- John Koskinen (IRS commissioner) (Cleveland)
- Dennis Kucinich (politician) (Cleveland)
- Alan George Lance Sr. (judge, politician, and national commander of The American Legion 1999–2000) (McComb)
- Kenesaw Mountain Landis (federal judge, baseball commissioner) (Millville)
- Frank Lausche (Ohio senator and governor)
- Susie Lee (politician, U.S. representative) (Canton)
- Lucile Petry Leone (Cadet Nurse Corps, assistant surgeon general) (Preble County)

M–Z

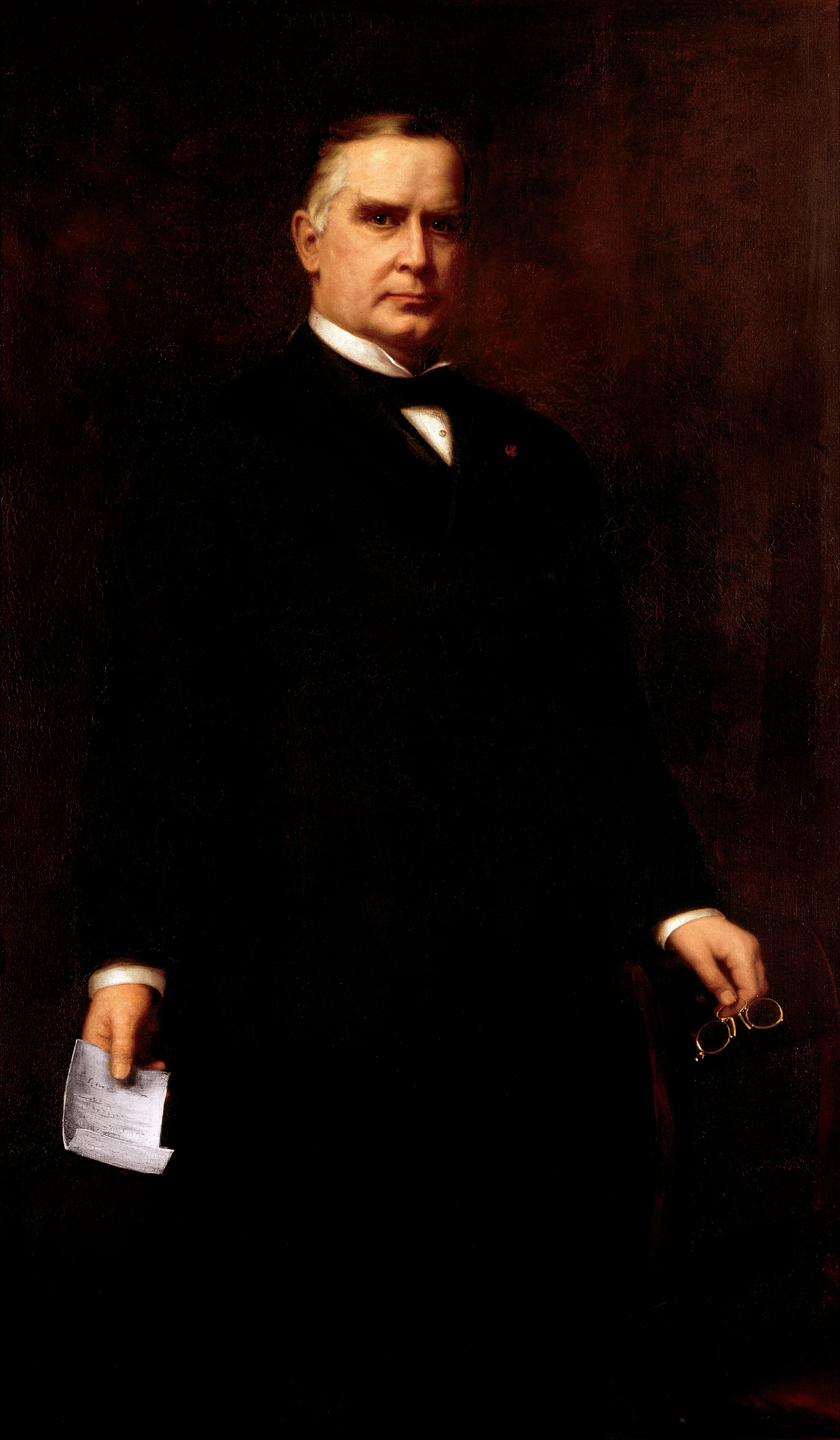
William McKinley

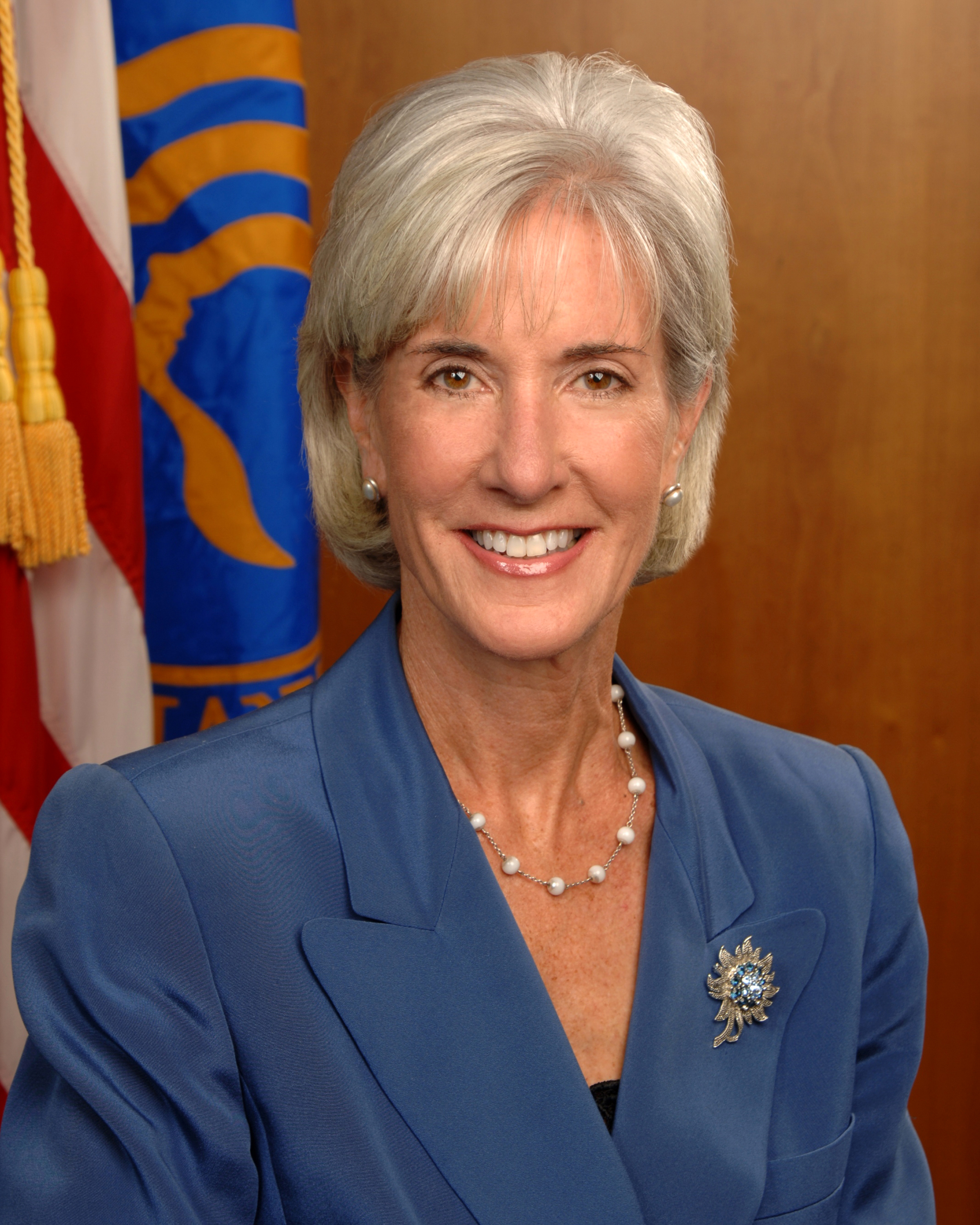
Kathleen Sebelius

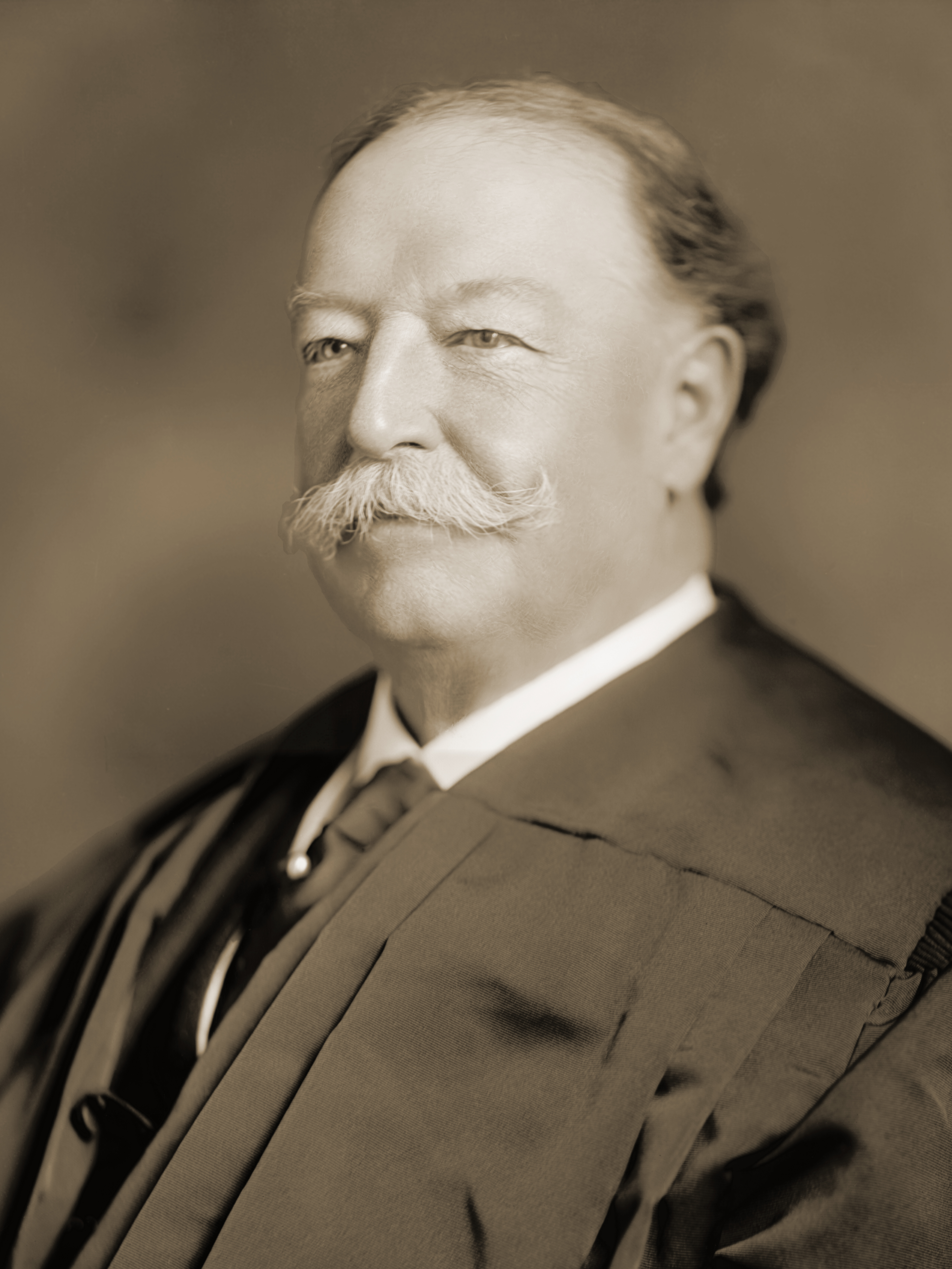
William Howard Taft

- Omarosa Manigault (assistant to the president) (Youngstown)
- John Michael Manos (federal judge) (Cleveland)
- Neil H. McElroy (businessman, cabinet secretary)
- William McKinley (25th president of the United States) (Niles)
- Howard Metzenbaum (senator from Ohio) (Cleveland)
- Arthur Ernest Morgan (college president, hydraulic engineer, TVA administrator)
- Chief Pontiac (Ottawa Indian chief)
- James A. Rhodes (politician, Ohio governor) (Jackson)
- Christina Romer (chair of Council of Economic Advisers) (Canton)
- Edward James Roye (5th president of Liberia) (Newark)
- Charles Ruff (White House counsel) (Cleveland)
- William Saxbe (U.S. senator, U.S. attorney general, ambassador to India) (Mechanicsburg)
- Kathleen Sebelius (U.S. secretary of Health and Human Services, former governor of Kansas) (Cincinnati)
- Donna Shalala (U.S. secretary of Health and Human Services, 1993–
- John Sherman (U.S. senator, brother of Gen. Sherman) (Lancaster)
- Tony Snow (White House press secretary) (Cincinnati)
- Charles Phelps Taft II (mayor of Cincinnati)
- Robert A. Taft I (politician) (Cincinnati)
- Robert A. Taft II (politician, Ohio governor)
- Robert Taft Jr.
- William Howard Taft (politician, jurist, 27th president of the United States, chief justice) (Cincinnati)
- Norman Thomas (politician) (Marion)
- David Tod (governor) (Youngstown)
- Albion Tourgée (activist for civil rights, author, lawyer) (Kingsville)
- James Traficant (politician, U.S. representative) (Youngstown)
- Clement Vallandigham (politician, activist) (Dayton)
- JD Vance (U.S. senator, 50th vice president of the United States) (Middletown)
- Stephen Venard (lawman) (Lebanon)
- George Voinovich (politician) (Cleveland)
- Brand Whitlock (politician, diplomat)
- Jay Williams (mayor) (Youngstown)
- F. A. Wing (politician) (Streetsboro)
- Mary Ellen Withrow (U.S. treasurer) (Marion)
- Victoria Claflin Woodhull (first woman to be nominated for president) (Homer, Licking County)

== Miscellaneous celebrities ==
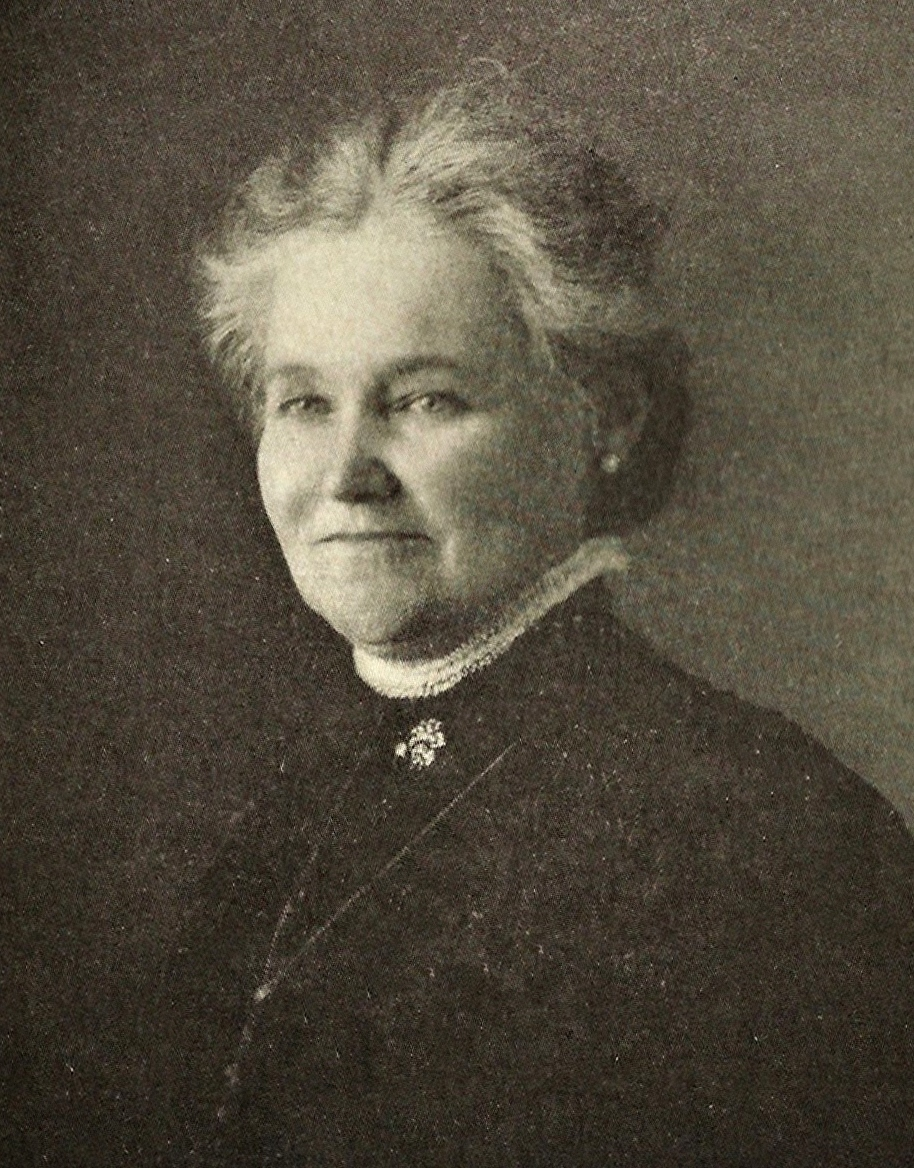
Nettie Metcalf

- Clyde Beatty (animal trainer) (Chillicothe)
- Brenda Carlin (television producer, wife of George Carlin) (Dayton)
- Steve Cook (pool player) (Lima)
- Mark Fischbach (YouTuber) (Cincinnati)
- Jack Hanna (zoo director, animal expert) (Columbus)
- The Naked Cowboy (Robert John Burck; Times Square street performer) (Cincinnati)
- Nettie Metcalf (farmer, chicken breeder) (Warren)
- Daniel Nardicio (marketing director of Playgirl) (Cleveland)
- Matthew Patrick (internet personality) (Medina)
- Danielle Reyes (contestant on Big Brother 3) (Dayton)
- Scott Wozniak (YouTuber)

== Military leaders ==
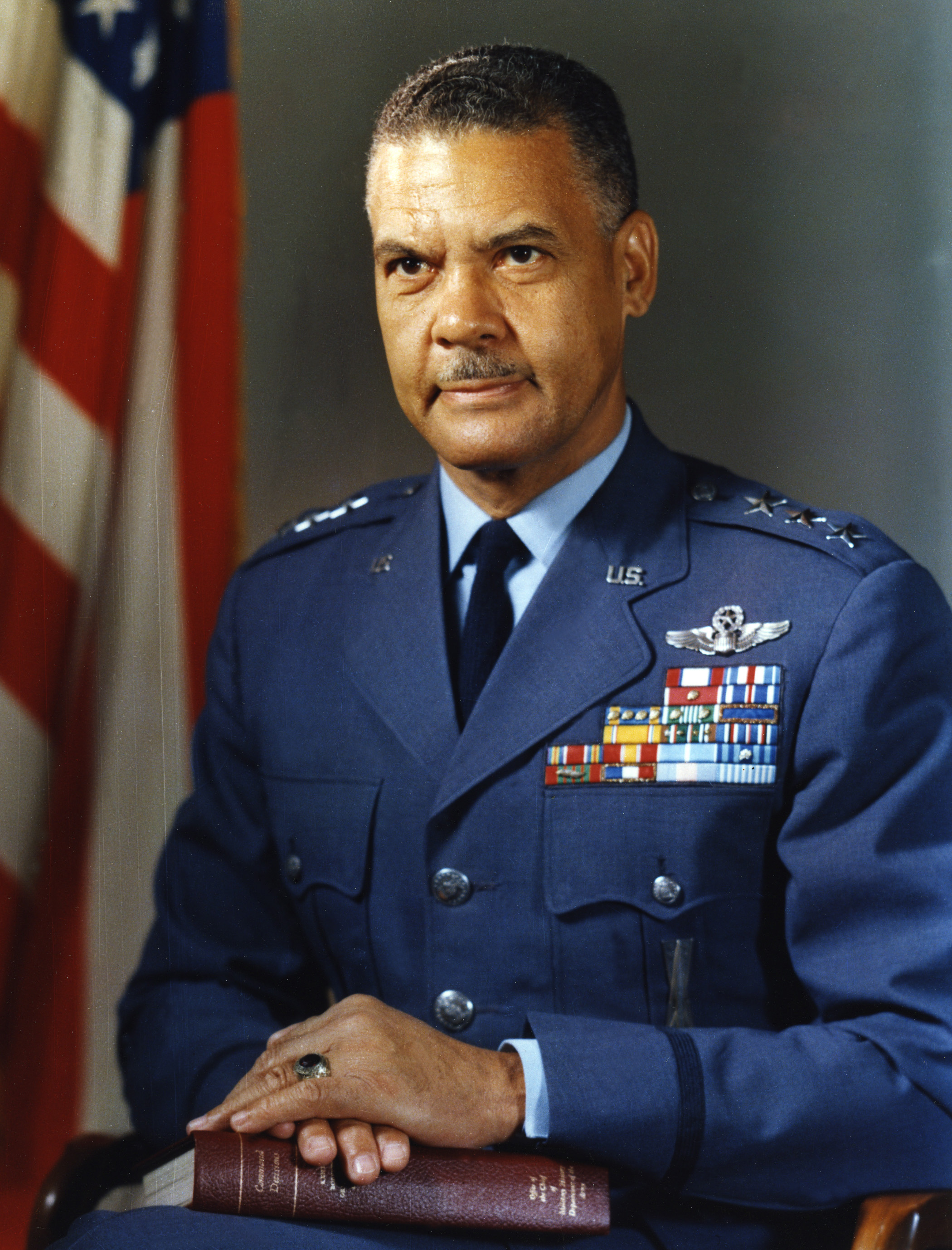
Benjamin O. Davis Jr.

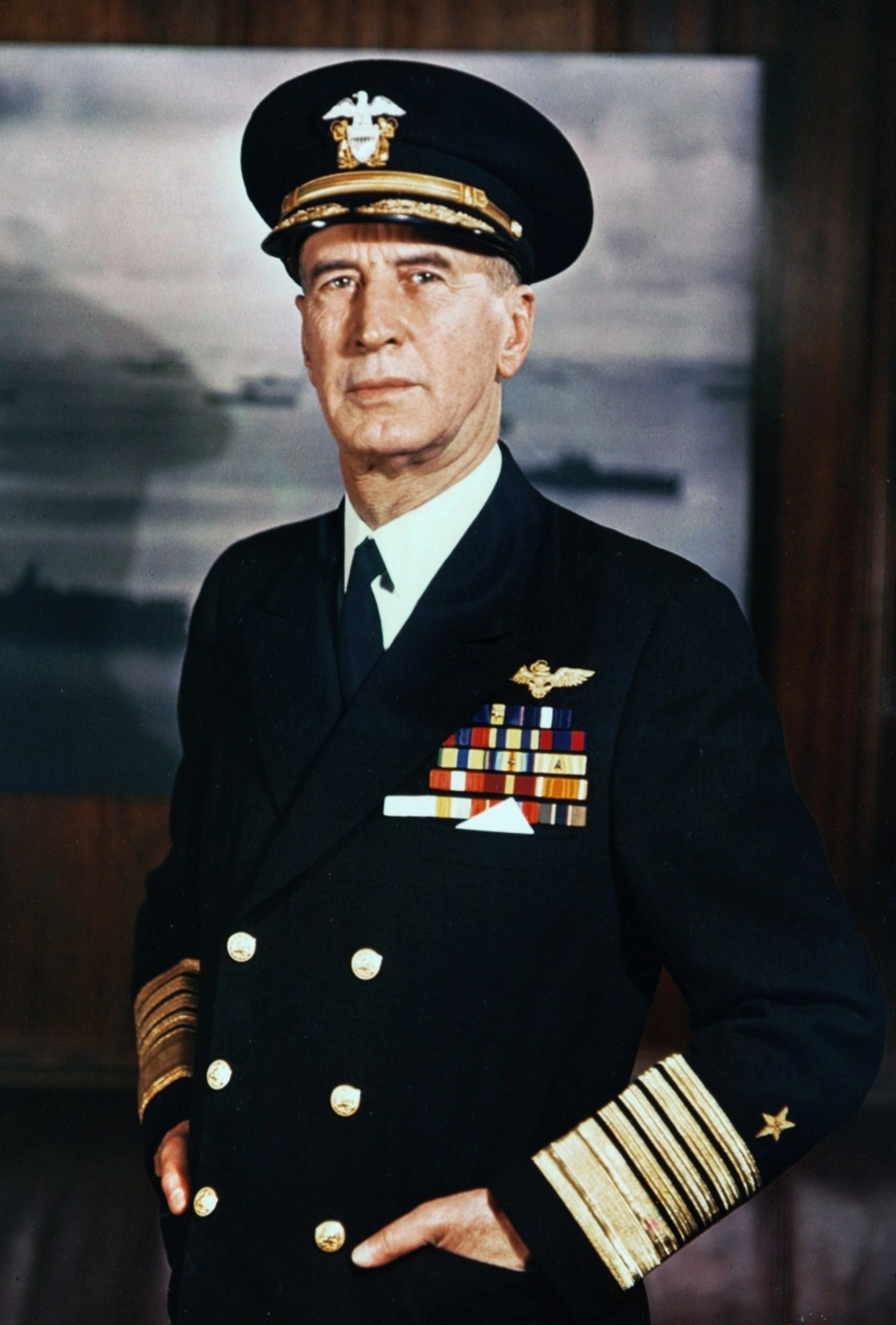
Ernest J. King

- "Mad" Ann Bailey (scout and spy for pioneers) (Harrison)
- Phil H. Bucklew (Navy officer) (Columbus)
- Don Carlos Buell (Civil War general) (Lowell)
- Cook Cleland (WW2 Navy flying ace) (Cleveland)
- George Crook (cavalry officer) (Taylorsville)
- George Custer (cavalry officer) (New Rumley)
- Benjamin O. Davis Jr. (first African-American general in U.S. Air Force) (Cleveland)
- William A. Foster (Medal of Honor recipient) (Cleveland)
- Dominic S. Gentile (World War II flying ace, first to break Rickenbacker's wartime kill record) (Piqua)
- Ulysses S. Grant (Civil War general, politician) (Point Pleasant)
- Andrew L. Harris (Civil War general, U.S. commissioner, Ohio governor)
- Simon Kenton (soldier, frontiersman, friend of Daniel Boone) (Urbana)
- Isaac C. Kidd (rear admiral USN) (killed on USS Arizona, Medal of Honor) (Cleveland)
- Ernest Joseph King (commander in chief, United States fleet and chief of naval operations during World War II) (Lorain)
- Whitmore Knaggs (soldier, spy)
- William C. Lambert (World War I aviator, fighter ace) (Ironton)
- Justin LeHew (sergeant major USMC; hero of Nasiriyah; Navy Cross, Bronze Star with Combat "V"; nominated for the Medal of Honor) (Columbus Grove)
- Curtis LeMay (founder of Strategic Air Command) (Columbus)
- William S. Rosecrans (inventor, coal-oil company executive, diplomat, politician, and U.S. Army officer during the American Civil War) (Kingston Township)
- Donald Russell Long (Medal of Honor, Vietnam)
- Jacob Parrott (first recipient of the Medal of Honor) (Fairfield County)
- Eddie Rickenbacker (pilot, race car driver) (Columbus)
- Robert C. Schenck (Civil War general, politician, diplomat) (Dayton)
- Philip Sheridan (Civil War general) (Somerset)
- William Tecumseh Sherman (Civil War general) (Lancaster)
- Tecumseh (Native American leader)
- Paul Tibbets (pilot of Enola Gay, World War II) (Columbus)
- Robert B. Wood (Civil War sailor, Medal of Honor) (New Garden)
- Rodger Young (World War II soldier) (Fremont)

== Architects, inventors, explorers, adventurers, astronauts, aviators, designers, spies ==
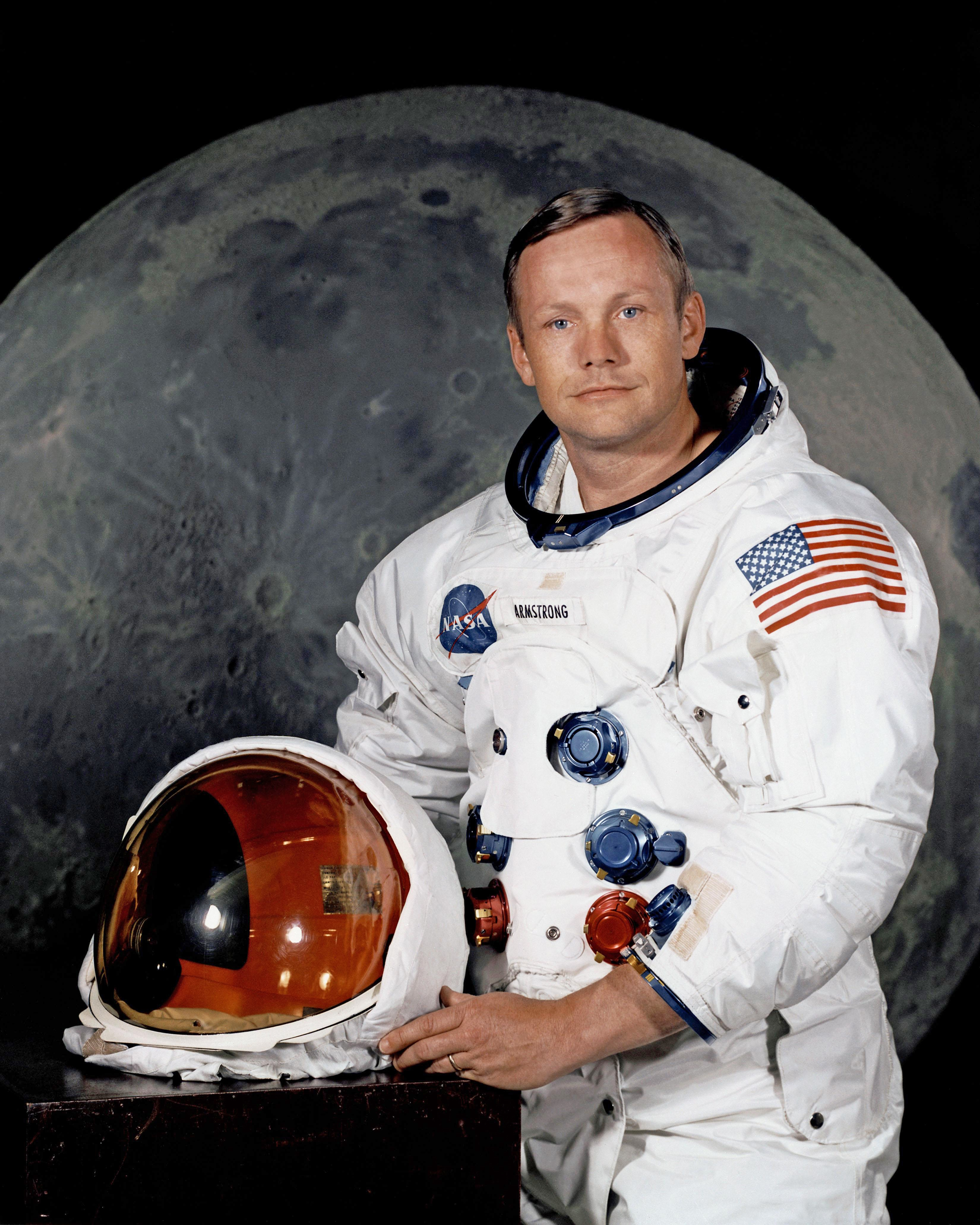
Neil Armstrong

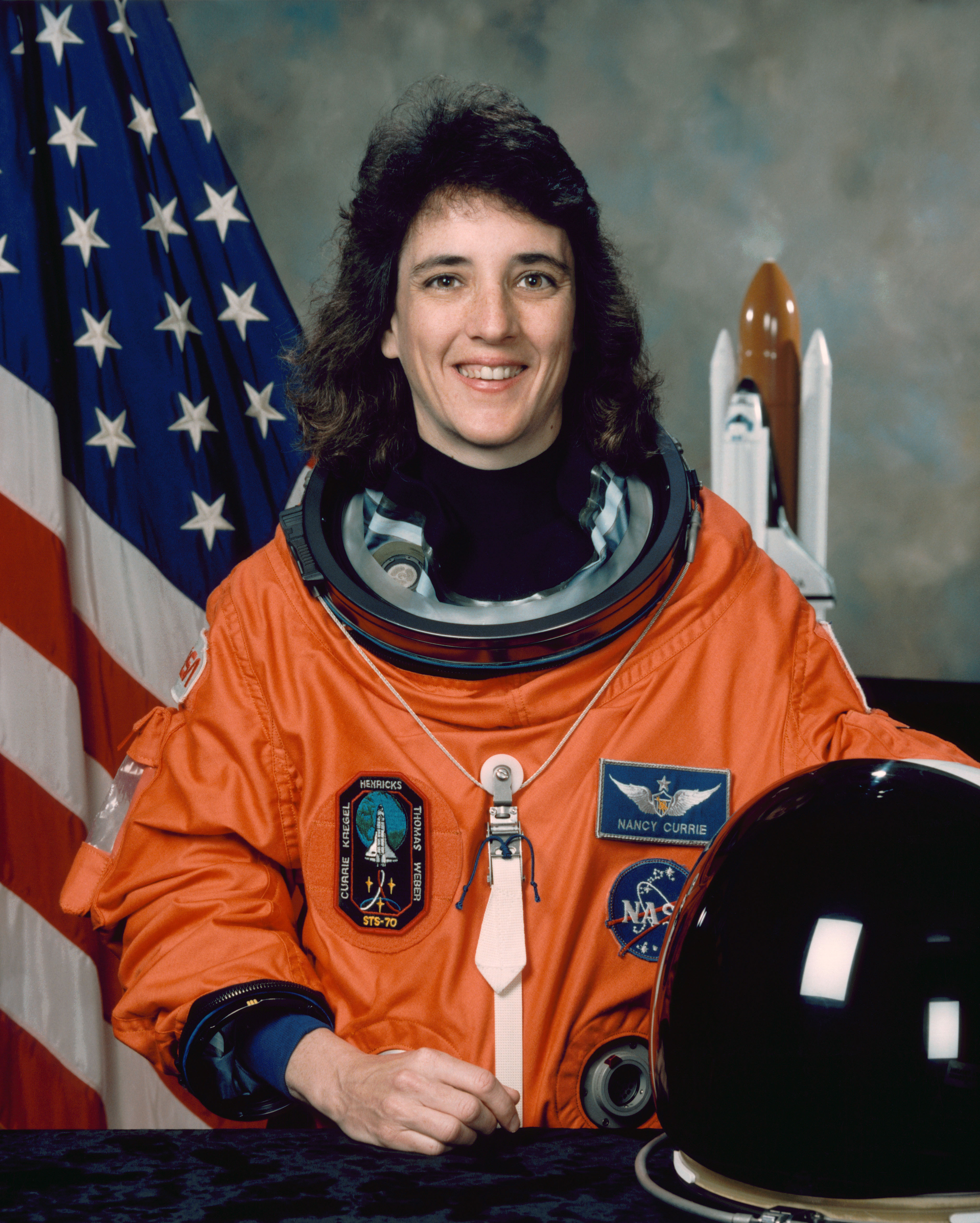
Nancy J. Currie-Gregg

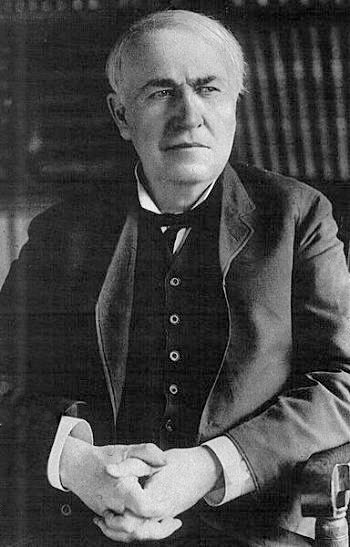
Thomas Edison

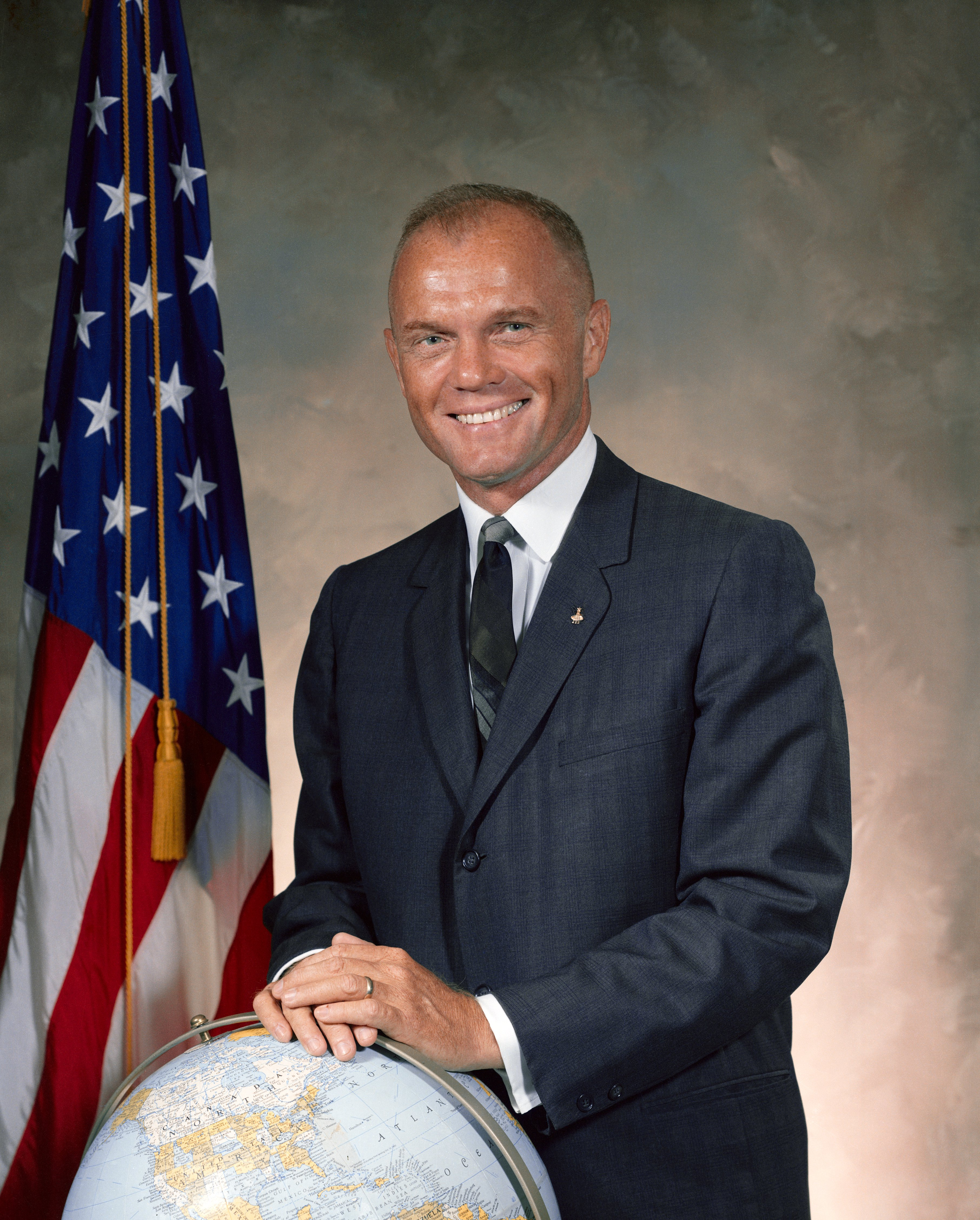
John Glenn

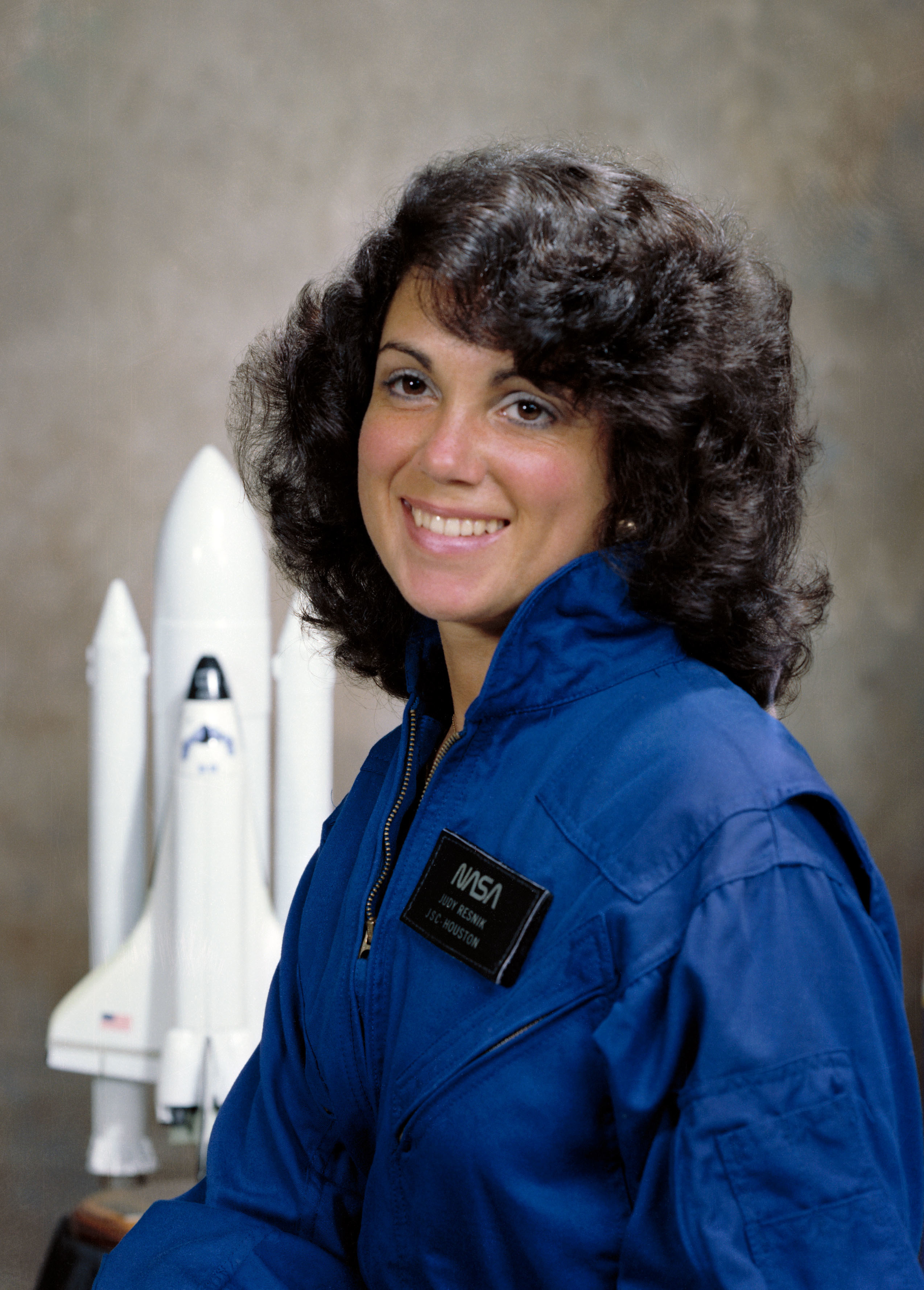
Judith Resnik

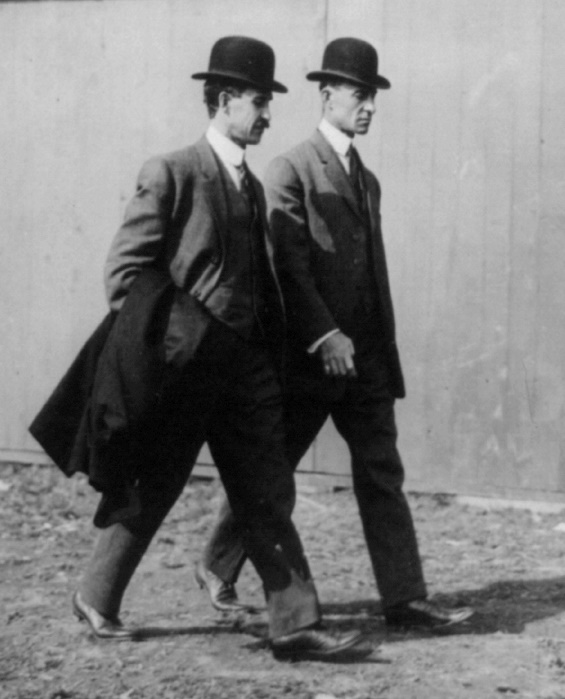
Orville and Wilbur Wright

- Conrad Keene Allen (exploration geologist) (Norwalk)
- Neil Armstrong (astronaut, first man on the Moon) (Wapakoneta/St. Marys)
- Christopher Bangle (automotive designer) (Ravenna)
- George Bartholomew (inventor)
- Norman Bel Geddes (industrial designer) (New Philadelphia)
- Guion S. Bluford Jr. (astronaut)
- Mark N. Brown (astronaut) (Dayton)
- Charles Brush (inventor, industrialist) (Cleveland)
- Kenneth D. Cameron (astronaut) (Cleveland)
- Dave Canterbury (co-star of Dual Survival)
- Nancy Currie (astronaut)
- Thomas Edison (inventor) (Milan)
- Donn F. Eisele (astronaut)
- Frederick W. Garber (architect) (Cincinnati)
- Michael L. Gernhardt (astronaut)
- Cass Gilbert (architect) (Zanesville)
- Paul Gilger (architect, set designer, playwright) (Mansfield)
- John Glenn (astronaut, politician, first American to orbit Earth) (Cambridge/New Concord)
- Michael T. Good (astronaut)
- Elisha Gray (inventor) (Barnesville)
- Gary Haney (architect) (Middletown)
- Samuel Hannaford (architect) (Cincinnati)
- Greg Harbaugh (astronaut) (Cleveland)
- Karl G. Henize (astronaut)
- Thomas J. Hennen (astronaut)
- Terence T. Henricks (astronaut)
- Tom Henricks (astronaut)
- Charles O. Hobaugh (astronaut) (North Ridgeville)
- Philip Johnson (architect) (Cleveland)
- Frederick McKinley Jones (inventor) (Cincinnati)
- Charles Kettering (inventor) (Loudenville/Dayton)
- Jim Lovell (astronaut) (Cleveland)
- G. David Low (astronaut) (Cleveland)
- Garrett Morgan (inventor) (Cleveland)
- Russell C. Newhouse (inventor) (Clyde)
- Robert F. Overmyer (astronaut)
- Ronald A. Parise (astronaut)
- James Polshek (architect) (Akron)
- Judith Resnik (astronaut) (Akron)
- Ron Sega (astronaut) (Cleveland)
- Howard Dwight Smith (architect) (Dayton/Columbus)
- Oberlin Smith (engineer) (Cincinnati)
- Robert C. Springer (astronaut) (Ashland)
- Kathryn D. Sullivan (astronaut)
- Don Thomas (astronaut)
- Ernest H. Volwiler (inventor) (Hamilton)
- Carl Walz (astronaut) (Cleveland)
- Mary Ellen Weber (astronaut) (Cleveland)
- Alexander Winton (inventor) (Cleveland)
- Granville Woods (inventor) (Columbus/Cincinnati)
- Orville Wright and Wilbur Wright (inventors) (Dayton)

== Businesspeople, entrepreneurs ==
- John Chambers (CEO of Cisco Systems) (Cleveland)
- Henry D. Coffinberry (industrialist) (Cleveland)
- John R. Commons (economist) (Hollansburg)
- Edward J. DeBartolo Sr. (developer, real estate magnate) (Youngstown)
- Larry Dolan (owner of the Cleveland Indians) (Cleveland Heights)
- Paul Dolan (CEO of the Cleveland Indians) (Chardon)
- Herbert H. Dow (chemist, industrialist) (Cleveland)
- Benjamin Franklin Fairless (steel company executive) (Pigeon Run)
- Harvey Samuel Firestone (founder of Firestone, inventor, industrialist) (Columbiana/Akron)
- John W. Galbreath (real estate mogul, owned Pittsburgh Pirates and Darby Dan Farm) (Columbus)
- Charles Geschke (co-founder of Adobe Systems) (Cleveland)
- B. F. Goodrich (industrialist) (Akron)
- Jeff Immelt (chairman and CEO of GE) (Cincinnati)
- Charles Keating (banker, activist) (Cincinnati)
- Charles F. Kettering (inventor, industrialist, philanthropist) (Loudonville/Dayton)
- James Michael Lafferty (CEO of Fine Hygienic Holding; former CEO of Procter and Gamble, Coca-Cola, and British American Tobacco; Olympic track and field coach) (Cincinnati)
- Peter B. Lewis (entrepreneur, philanthropist, activist) (Cleveland)
- Carl Lindner (entrepreneur, political contributor, philanthropist) (Cincinnati)
- Brian Moynihan (CEO of Bank of America) (Marietta)
- Henry Nicholas (co-founder of Broadcom Corporation) (Cincinnati)
- Ransom Olds (automaker, Oldsmobile) (Geneva)
- James Ward Packard (automaker, Packard) (born Warren, died Cleveland)
- William Doud Packard (automaker, Packard) (Warren)
- Don Panoz (entrepreneur) (Alliance)
- John H. Patterson (industrialist) (Dayton)
- Terren Peizer (businessperson convicted of insider trading and securities fraud)
- Roger Penske (racing driver, entrepreneur) (Shaker Heights)
- William Procter (industrialist) (Cincinnati)
- Bruce Ratner (real estate developer, owned the New Jersey Nets) (Cleveland)
- John D. Rockefeller (industrialist) (Strongsville/Cleveland)
- Michael J. Saylor (co-founder of MicroStrategy) (Fairborn)
- Ernesto Schmitt (entrepreneur) (Cincinnati)
- Frank Seiberling (industrialist) (Goodyear Tire & Rubber Co.)
- Gary Shilling (financial analyst and commentator)
- David Sinton (industrialist) (Cincinnati)
- George Steinbrenner (shipping magnate, owned the New York Yankees) (Cleveland)
- Ronald Wayne (co-founder of Apple Inc.) (Cleveland)
- Ralph Wilson (Hall of Fame owner of the Buffalo Bills) (Columbus)
- Denise DeBartolo York (co-chair of the San Francisco 49ers) (Youngstown)
- Jed York (president and owner of the San Francisco 49ers) (Youngstown)

== Publishers, media moguls ==
- Roger Ailes (former chairman and CEO of Fox News) (Warren)
- Mary Towne Burt (temperance reformer, newspaper publisher of Our Union) (Cincinnati)
- Nettie Sanford Chapin (newspaper publisher of The Ladies Bureau) (Portage County)
- Ethlyn T. Clough publisher and editor of The Brooklyn Exponent) (Monroeville)
- James M. Cox (publisher of Dayton Daily News, founder of Cox Communications, politician) (Jacksonburg)
- Larry Flynt (publisher of Hustler adult magazine) (Cincinnati)
- Adolph Ochs (former owner of The New York Times) (Cincinnati)
- Esther Pritchard (minister; editor and publisher of the Friend's Missionary Advocate) (Morrow County)
- Esther Pugh (temperance reformer; editor and publisher of Our Union) (Cincinnati)
- Ted Turner (founder of Turner Broadcasting, CNN) (Cincinnati)
- Jack L. Warner (co-founder of Warner Bros. Studios) (Youngstown)
- Les Wexner (chairman and CEO of Limited Brands) (Dayton/New Albany)

== Activists, philanthropists, public agitators, advocates, lawyers ==
- Rosa Miller Avery (abolitionist, reformer, writer) (Madison)
- Daniel Carter Beard (founder of the Boy Scouts of America) (Cincinnati)
- Elizabeth Blackwell (abolitionist, women's rights activist, first female doctor in U.S.) (Cincinnati)
- John Brown (abolitionist) (Hudson)
- Alice A. W. Cadwallader (philanthropist and temperance activist) (St. Clairsville)
- Rebecca Ballard Chambers (temperance reformer) (Ohio)
- Annie W. Clark (social reformer)
- Sara Jane Crafts (educator, author, social reformer) (Cincinnati)
- Ronald Daniels (activist) (Youngstown)
- Clarence Seward Darrow (lawyer, leading member of the ACLU) (Kinsman)
- Richard Dillingham (Quaker abolitionist) (Morrow County)
- Susanna M. D. Fry (educator, social reformer) (Burlington)
- Albert B. Graham (founder of 4-H) (Springfield, Clark County)
- Linda Hirshman (lawyer, feminist) (Cleveland)
- Esther T. Housh (social reformer, magazine editor) (Ross County)
- William Alexander Morgan (fought in the Cuban Revolution) (Cleveland/Toledo)
- Carl Oglesby (activist) (Akron)
- Madalyn Murray O'Hair (activist) (Rossford)
- John Oller (attorney, writer, biographer) (Huron)
- Alice E. Heckler Peters (social reformer) (Dayton)
- Utah Phillips (labor organizer) (Cleveland)
- Achilles Pugh (publisher of The Philanthropist; anti-slavery activist) (Cadiz, Waynesville, Cincinnati)
- Laura Rockefeller (abolitionist, philanthropist) (Wadsworth)
- Martha Parmelee Rose (1834–1923) (journalist, social reformer, philanthropist) (Norton)
- Rick Alan Ross (deprogrammer) (Cleveland)
- Jerry Rubin ('60s, '70s radical activist) (Cincinnati)
- Lee Saunders (labor leader) (Cleveland)
- Annie Sinton-Taft (philanthropist) (Cincinnati)
- Bob Smith (doctor, founder of Alcoholics Anonymous) (Akron)
- Gloria Steinem (feminist) (Toledo)
- Lillian Wald (activist) (Cincinnati)
- Irvin F. Westheimer (founder of Big Brothers Big Sisters)
- Raymond Winbush (scholar, activist) (Cleveland)
- Victoria Woodhull (activist, stockbroker, journalist, politician) (Homer/Mount Gilead)

== Criminals ==
- Robert Bales (Kandahar massacre perpetrator) (Norwood)
- Ariel Castro (rapist and kidnapper) (Cleveland)
- Jeffrey Dahmer (serial killer) (lived in Bath)
- Donald DeFreeze (Patty Hearst kidnapper) (Cleveland)
- Thomas Dillon (serial killer) (Canton)
- Martin Frankel (financier) (Toledo)
- Jimmy Fratianno (mobster) (Cleveland)
- Shawn Grate (serial killer) (Ashland, Mansfield, Marion)
- Danny Greene (mobster) (Cleveland)
- Gary M. Heidnik (rapist, kidnapper, murderer) (Eastlake)
- James Oliver Huberty (murderer) (Massillon)
- Anthony Kirkland (Cincinnati serial killer)
- Samuel Little (serial killer) (Lorain)
- Jeffrey Don Lundgren (cult leader, murderer) Kirtland
- Charles Makley (bank robber) (Saint Marys)
- Charles Manson (convicted murderer, cult/commune leader) (Cincinnati/Walnut Hills)
- Carmen Milano (mobster) (Cleveland)
- Peter Milano (mobster) (Cleveland)
- Anthony Sowell (rapist and serial killer) (Cleveland)

== Educators, religious leaders, lecturers, motivational speakers, self-help gurus ==
- Aaron Brumbaugh (president of Shimer College) (Hartville)
- Cynthia S. Burnett (educator and temperance reformer) (Niles)
- John Lewis Dyer (Methodist circuit rider in Minnesota and Colorado; considered one of 16 founders of Colorado) (born in Franklin County)
- Yusuf Estes (Islamic scholar) (born in Ohio)
- William Holmes McGuffey (educator, author) (Tuscarawas County/Oxford/Cincinnati)
- Raymond Moley (professor, member of FDR's "Brain Trust", author) (Berea)
- Norman Vincent Peale (author, professional speaker, clergyman) (Bowersville)
- Michelle Rhee (educator, education reform leader) (Toledo)
- William P. Richardson (co-founder and first dean of Brooklyn Law School) (Farmer Center)
- William Strunk Jr. (educator, author) (Cincinnati)
- Tenskwatawa (religious and political leader of the Shawnee Indians) (Ross County)

== Scholars, scientists, historians, theorists, philosophers, opinionists ==
- Zoltan Acs (economist) (Cleveland)
- Mary Ainsworth (psychologist) (Glendale)
- Gordon Allport (psychologist) (Cleveland)
- James B. Anderson (chemical engineer) (Cleveland)
- Edgar Bain (metallurgist) (LaRue)
- Richard C. Banks (ornithologist) (Steubenville)
- Brand Blanshard (philosopher) (Fredericksburg)
- Michael Brooks (historian, journalist) (Toledo)
- William Merriam Burton (chemist) (Cleveland)
- Judith Butler (philosopher, gender theorist) (Cleveland)
- William Campbell (astronomer) (Hancock County)
- Richard E. Caves (economist) (Akron)
- Neil W. Chamberlain (economist) (Lakewood)
- Walker Lee Cisler (mechanical engineer) (Marietta)
- John R. Commons (economist, historian) (Hollansburg)
- Gustav Eckstein (writer, medical doctor, psychologist)
- Thomas Alva Edison (scientist, inventor)
- William A. Fowler (physicist, Nobel Prize winner) (The Ohio State University, Lima)
- Marye Anne Fox (organic chemist) (Canton)
- James J. Gibson (psychologist) (McConnelsville)
- Rosetta Luce Gilchrist (physician, writer) (Kingsville)
- Donald A. Glaser (physicist, Nobel Prize winner) (Cleveland)
- Irving I. Gottesman (psychologist, behavioral geneticist) (Cleveland)
- Charles Martin Hall (inventor, engineer) (Thompson)
- Samuel Dana Horton (monetary theorist)
- Charles Kettering (inventor, engineer) (Loudonville)
- Thomas Kuhn (philosopher of science) (Cincinnati)
- Arthur Laffer (supply-side economist) (Youngstown)
- Fredric Jameson (philosopher, Marxist political theorist) (Cleveland)
- Harry March (football historian, doctor) (New Franklin/Canton)
- Albert A. Michelson (physicist) (Case Institute of Technology)
- Virginia Minnich (biologist) (Zanesville)
- Dorothea Rhodes Lummis Moore (physician, newspaper editor) (Chillicothe)
- Garrett Morgan (inventor) (Cleveland)
- Edward W. Morley (physicist) (Western Reserve University)
- Ralph Paffenbarger (epidemiologist) (Columbus)
- Roy J. Plunkett (chemist) (New Carlisle)
- Willard Van Orman Quine (logician and philosopher) (Akron)
- Joseph Ransohoff (neurosurgeon, inventor) (Cincinnati)
- Frederick Rentschler (aviation engineer) (Hamilton)
- Charles Richter (physicist) (Overpeck)
- Frank Sherwood Rowland (chemist, Nobel Prize winner) (Delaware)
- Arthur M. Schlesinger Sr. (historian) (Xenia)
- Zalman Shapiro (chemist, inventor) (Canton)
- Thomas Sherwood (chemical engineer) (Columbus)
- Thomas J. Silhavy (molecular biologist) (Wauseon)
- Richard Smalley (chemist, Nobel Prize winner) (Akron)
- Oberlin Smith (engineer, magnetic recording pioneer) (Cincinnati)
- Lee Smolin (theoretical physicist) (Cincinnati)
- George Smoot (astrophysicist, Nobel Prize winner) (Upper Arlington)
- Richard S. Sutton (computer scientist)
- Sander Vanocur (commentator) (Cleveland)
- Ezra F. Vogel (sociologist) (Delaware)
- John S. Wilson (economist) (Lakewood)
- Elizabeth Witherell (editor-in-chief of The Writings of Henry D. Thoreau) (Toledo)
- Michael S. Witherell (particle physicist, president of Fermilab) (Toledo)
- Richard D. Wolff (Marxist economist) (Youngstown)
- Allyn Abbott Young (economist) (Kenton)

== Singers, musicians, composers, songwriters, conductors ==
A–C

- Rita Abrams (songwriter-performer-writer) (Cleveland)
- Lee Adams (Broadway lyricist) (Mansfield)
- Leslie Adams [H. Leslie Adams] (composer) (Cleveland)
- Steven Adler (musician, original drummer, Guns N' Roses) (Cleveland)
- Harley Allen (singer-songwriter) (Dayton)
- Ray Anthony (musician) (Cleveland)
- Joseph Arthur (musician) (Akron)
- Dan Auerbach (guitarist and singer, The Black Keys) (Akron)
- Avant (musician) (Cleveland)
- Albert Ayler (musician) (Cleveland)
- David Baerwald (musician) (Oxford)
- Benny Bailey (jazz trumpeter) (Cleveland)
- Anita Baker (singer) (Toledo)
- Julius Baker (classical flutist) (Cleveland)
- Bobby Bare (singer) (Ironton)
- Lou Barlow (musician) (Dayton)
- John Bassette (singer, musician) (Cleveland)
- Stiv Bators (musician) (Youngstown)
- Kathleen Battle (opera singer) (Portsmouth)
- Margaret Baxtresser (classical pianist) (Kent)
- Andy Biersack (singer) (Cincinnati)
- Cindy Blackman (musician) (Yellow Springs)
- Bow Wow (rapper) (Reynoldsburg)
- Crystal Bowersox (musician) (Toledo)
- Don Braden (jazz saxophonist) (Cincinnati)
- Tiny Bradshaw (jazz bandleader) (Youngstown)
- Teresa Brewer (singer) (Toledo)..
- Jim Brickman (musician, songwriter) (Cleveland)
- Jerry Brightman (producer, musician, Buck Owens) (Akron)
- Dave Burrell (jazz pianist) (Middletown)
- Chris Butler (musician, The Waitresses) (Akron)
- Billy Butterfield (jazz trumpeter) (Middletown)
- Glen Buxton (guitarist, original Alice Cooper band) (Akron)
- Casey Calvert (vocalist, Hawthorne Heights) (Dayton)
- Eric Carmen (musician) (Cleveland)
- Patrick Carney (drummer and producer, The Black Keys) (Akron)
- Ralph Carney (saxophonist) (Akron)
- Lionel Cartwright (musician, singer) (Gallipolis)
- Gerald Casale (musician) (Kent)
- Tracy Chapman (singer-songwriter) (Cleveland)
- Cheetah Chrome (musician, Dead Boys) (Cleveland)
- Charles W. Clark (operatic singer, vocalist teacher) (Van Wert)
- Gilby Clarke (musician) (Cleveland)
- Tammy Cochran (singer) (Austinburg)
- David Allan Coe (singer, musician) (Akron)
- Marc Cohn (singer) (Cleveland)
- Bootsy Collins (musician) (Cincinnati)
- Earl Thomas Conley (singer) (Portsmouth)
- Cowboy Copas (singer) (Adams County)
- Stanley Cowell (jazz pianist) (Toledo)
- Susan Cowsill (singer) (Canton)
- Gavin Creel (singer) (Findlay)

D–I

- Tadd Dameron (jazz composer) (Cleveland)
- Dorothy Dandridge (singer, actress) (Cleveland)
- Dennis Russell Davies (orchestral conductor) (Toledo)
- Bill Davison (jazz cornetist) (Defiance)
- Doris Day (big band singer, actress) (Cincinnati)
- Kelley Deal (musician, The Breeders) (Huber Heights/Dayton)
- Kim Deal (musician, The Breeders) (Huber Heights/Dayton)
- Bill DeArango (jazz guitarist) (Cleveland)
- Jay DeMarcus (singer, bassist and keyboardist, Rascal Flatts) (Columbus)
- Paul DeMarinis (electronic music composer) (Cleveland)
- Jerry DePizzo (saxophonist, O.A.R.) (Youngstown)
- Rick Derringer (singer) (Fort Recovery)
- Frank DeVol (composer, actor) (Canton)
- Greg Dewey (drummer, Country Joe and the Fish) (Yellow Springs)
- Vic Dickenson (jazz trombonist) (Xenia)
- Bethany Dillon (Christian singer-songwriter) (Bellefontaine)
- Martin Dillon (tenor and music professor) (Portsmouth)
- Patty Donahue (singer, The Waitresses) (Akron)
- Mark S. Doss (operatic bass-baritone) (Cleveland)
- Jerry Douglas (musician) (Warren)
- Greg Dulli (singer, musician) (Hamilton)
- Josh Dun (drummer, Twenty One Pilots) (Columbus)
- Harry Edison (jazz trumpeter) (Columbus)
- Halim El-Dabh (composer, musician, ethnomusicologist) (Kent)
- James Emery (jazz guitarist) (Youngstown, Shaker Heights)
- Donald Erb (composer) (Youngstown)
- Eric Ewazen (composer) (Cleveland)
- Michael Feinstein (singer) (Columbus)
- Frederick Fennell (band conductor) (Cleveland)
- Jim Ferguson (classical and jazz guitarist) (Dayton)
- Bobby Few (jazz pianist) (Cleveland)
- Anton Fier (drummer, The Golden Palominos) (Cleveland)
- Henry Fillmore (composer) (Cincinnati)
- Frank Foster (jazz saxophonist and bandleader) (Cincinnati)
- Mark Foster (singer, Foster the People) (Cleveland)
- Craig Fuller (musician) (Waverly, Columbus)
- Larry Fuller (jazz pianist) (Toledo)
- Sonny Geraci (singer, Outsiders) (Climax, Cleveland)
- Neil Giraldo (guitarist, songwriter) (Cleveland)
- Jeff Golub (jazz guitarist) (Copley)
- Macy Gray (singer) (Canton)
- Max Green (musician) (Cincinnati)
- Joel Grey (singer, actor, dancer) (Cleveland)
- Dave Grohl (musician, Nirvana and Foo Fighters) (Warren)
- Clare Grundman (composer and arranger) (Cleveland)
- Keith Harrison (singer, musician, Dazz Band) (Dayton)
- Screamin' Jay Hawkins (musician) (Cleveland)
- J.C. Heard (drummer) (Dayton)
- Joe Henderson (jazz saxophonist) (Lima)
- Jon Hendricks (jazz singer and arranger) (Newark)
- Fred Hersch (jazz pianist) (Cincinnati)
- Howard Hewett (singer, Shalamar) (Akron)
- J.C. Higginbotham (jazz trombonist) (Cincinnati)
- Christian Howes (jazz violinist) (Rocky River)
- Pee Wee Hunt (jazz trombonist) (Mount Healthy)
- Chrissie Hynde (musician) (Akron)
- James Ingram (singer-songwriter, musician) (Akron)
- Sonya Isaacs (singer) (Morrow)
- Ernie Isley (singer) (Cincinnati)
- Ron Isley (singer) (Cincinnati)
- Chuck Israels (jazz bassist) (Cleveland)

J–M

- Tommy James (musician) (Dayton)
- Al Jardine (musician, The Beach Boys) (Lima)
- Lyfe Jennings (R&B musician) (Toledo)
- Howard Jones (lead singer, Killswitch Engage) (Columbus)
- Tyler Joseph (musician, singer, Twenty One Pilots) (Columbus)
- Mickey Katz (clarinetist, comedian) (Cleveland)
- Sammy Kaye (swing bandleader) (Lakewood)
- Phil Keaggy (musician, Glass Harp) (Youngstown)
- Maynard James Keenan (musician, lead singer, Tool and A Perfect Circle) (Ravenna)
- Emily Keener (singer, musician) (Wakeman)
- Machine Gun Kelly (rapper) (Cleveland)
- Khaledzou (music producer) (Youngstown)
- Kid Cudi (musician) (Cleveland)
- Karl King (band composer and conductor) (Paintersville)
- Roland Kirk (musician) (Columbus)
- Chris Kirkpatrick (singer) (Dalton)
- Mark Kozelek (singer, musician) (Massillon)
- Josh Krajcik (singer, musician) (Wooster)
- Kramies (singer-songwriter, recording artist) (Cleveland)
- Ernie Krivda (jazz saxophonist) (Cleveland)
- Erich Kunzel (classical conductor) (Cincinnati)
- Drew Lachey (musician) (Cincinnati)
- Nick Lachey (musician) (Cincinnati)
- Jani Lane (musician, Warrant) (Akron)
- Neil Larsen (keyboardist) (Cleveland)
- Peter Laughner (musician, Rocket from the Tombs) (Bay Village)
- Griffin Layne (recording artist, singer-songwriter) (Kettering)
- John Legend (musician) (Springfield)
- Gerald Levert (R&B singer) (Cleveland)
- James Levine (conductor, musician) (Cincinnati)
- Gary LeVox (lead singer, Rascal Flatts) (Columbus/Lewis Center)
- Bob Lewis (musician) (Akron)
- Ted Lewis (bandleader) (Circleville)
- Lexi (gospel singer) (Canton)
- Tommy LiPuma (music production) (Cleveland)
- Robert Lockwood Jr. (bluesman) (Cleveland)
- Ty Longley (musician, guitarist, Great White) (Brookfield)
- Lux Interior (born Erick Purkhiser) (musician) (Stow)
- John Mack (classical oboist) (Cleveland)
- Eli Maiman (guitarist, Walk the Moon) (Cincinnati)
- Henry Mancini (composer) (Cleveland)
- Marilyn Manson (musician) (Canton)
- Brad Martin (singer) (Greenfield)
- Dean Martin (singer, actor) (Steubenville)
- Jessica Lea Mayfield (musician) (Kent)
- Maureen McGovern (singer) (Youngstown)
- Dottie McGuire (singer, The McGuire Sisters) (Middletown)
- Phyllis McGuire (singer, The McGuire Sisters) (Middletown)
- Ruby McGuire (singer, The McGuire Sisters) (Middletown)
- Allen McKenzie (bass guitar, singer, FireHouse) (Jackson)
- Andrew McMahon (musician, lead singer, Something Corporate and Jack's Mannequin) (Bexley)
- Sylvia McNair (classical singer) (Mansfield)
- MGK (rapper) (Cleveland)
- Donald Mills (musician, The Mills Brothers) (Piqua)
- Harry Mills (musician, The Mills Brothers) (Piqua)
- Herbert Mills (musician, The Mills Brothers) (Piqua)
- John Mills Jr. (musician, The Mills Brothers) (Piqua)
- John Hutchinson Mills (musician, The Mills Brothers) (Piqua)
- Jason Molina (musician) (Oberlin)
- Vaughn Monroe (singer) (Akron)
- Junie Morrison (lead singer, Ohio Players) (Dayton)
- Seth Morrison (guitar) (Wheelersburg)
- Bob Mothersbaugh (musician, Devo) (Akron)
- Mark Mothersbaugh (musician, Devo) (Akron)
- Shirley Murdock (singer) (Toledo)
- Frank J. Myers (singer-songwriter) (Dayton)

N–R

- Ruby Nash Garnett (singer, Ruby & the Romantics) (Akron)
- Bern Nix (jazz guitarist) (Toledo)
- Russell Oberlin (classical singer) (Akron)
- Phil Ochs (protest singer) (Columbus)
- Jamie O'Hara (singer-songwriter) (Toledo)
- Benjamin Orr (musician, The Cars) (Lakewood)
- Tim "Ripper" Owens (singer, Judas Priest) (Akron)
- Gary Patterson (musician) (Cleveland)
- Johnny Paycheck (singer) (Greenfield)
- Danielle Peck (singer) (Coshocton)
- Ken Peplowski (jazz saxophonist) (Cleveland)
- Nicholas Petricca (singer-songwriter, musician) (Cincinnati)
- Utah Phillips (folk singer) (Cleveland)
- Robert Pollard (composer) (Dayton)
- John Popper (singer, Blues Traveler) (Cleveland)
- Steve Potts (jazz saxophonist) (Columbus)
- Robert Quine (guitarist, Richard Hell and the Voidoids) (Akron)
- Joshua Radin (singer-songwriter) (Shaker Heights)
- Chuck Rainey (bassist, Steely Dan) (Cleveland)
- Kevin Ray (musician, Walk the Moon) (Columbus)
- Trippie Redd (rapper) (Canton)
- Conrad Reeder (singer-songwriter) (Columbus)
- Antonio "L.A." Reid (record executive, songwriter, producer) (Cincinnati)
- Alvino Rey (bandleader) (Cleveland)
- Trent Reznor (musician, Nine Inch Nails) (Cleveland)
- Marty Roe (lead singer, Diamond Rio) (Lebanon)
- Roy Rogers (singer, actor) (Cincinnati, Portsmouth, Lucasville, McDermott)
- Vanessa Rubin (jazz singer) (Cleveland)
- George Russell (jazz composer) (Cincinnati)
- John Morris Russell (classical conductor) (Cleveland, Cincinnati)

S–Z

- JD Samson (musician, Le Tigre) (Cleveland)
- Scott Savol (singer) (Cleveland)
- Boz Scaggs (singer-songwriter) (Canton)
- Tom Scholz (musician, inventor) (Toledo)
- John Scofield (jazz-rock guitarist) (Dayton)
- Jimmy Scott (jazz singer) (Cleveland)
- Brady Seals (musician) (Fairfield)
- Ruth Crawford Seeger (modernist composer) (East Liverpool)
- Philip Setzer (classical violinist, Emerson String Quartet) (Cleveland)
- Bud Shank (jazz saxophonist) (Dayton)
- Elliott Sharp (guitarist, saxophonist) (Cleveland)
- Scott Shriner (musician, Weezer) (Toledo)
- Eric Singer (musician, Kiss) (Cleveland)
- Connie Smith (singer) (Marietta)
- Hale Smith (jazz composer) (Cleveland)
- Mamie Smith (singer) (Cincinnati)
- Stuff Smith (jazz violinist) (Portsmouth)
- Robert Spano (orchestral conductor) (Conneaut)
- Stalley (rapper) (Massilon)
- Michael Stanley (musician) (Cleveland)
- Billy Strayhorn (jazz composer) (Dayton)
- Rachel Sweet (musician) (Akron)
- Chad Szeliga (drummer, Breaking Benjamin) (Elyria)
- George Szell (orchestral conductor) (Cleveland)
- Art Tatum (jazz pianist) (Toledo)
- Danny Thomas (singer, comedian) (Toledo)
- David Thomas (musician) (Akron)
- Charles Thompson (jazz pianist) (Springfield)
- Jeff Timmons (singer-songwriter, producer) (Cleveland)
- Joe Trohman (guitarist, Fall Out Boy) (South Russell)
- Roger Troutman (musician, singer-songwriter) (Dayton/Hamilton)
- Mark Turner (jazz saxophonist) (Fairborn)
- Kate Voegele (singer-songwriter, musician) (Bay Village)
- Abdul Wadud (jazz cellist) (Cleveland)
- Scott Walker (singer, The Walker Brothers) (Hamilton)
- Joe Walsh (musician) (Kent, Cleveland)
- Robert Ward (classical composer) (Cleveland)
- Earle Warren (jazz saxophonist) (Springfield)
- Sean Waugaman (drummer, Walk the Moon) (Columbus)
- Jeff Weaver (musician) (Athens)
- Scott Weiland (musician) (Cleveland)
- Jiggs Whigham (jazz trombonist) (Cleveland)
- Vesta Williams (singer) (Coshocton)
- John Finley Williamson (choral conductor) (Canton, Dayton)
- Nancy Wilson (singer) (Chillicothe)
- Bobby Womack (singer) (Cleveland)
- JT Woodruff (singer, Hawthorne Heights) (Dayton)
- Frank Yankovic (musician) (Cleveland)
- Jimmy Yeary (singer) (Hillsboro)
- Dwight Yoakam (singer, actor) (Columbus)
- Snooky Young (jazz trumpeter) (Dayton)

== See also ==
- List of people from Akron, Ohio
- List of people from Ashtabula, Ohio
- List of people from Cincinnati
- List of people from Cleveland
- List of people from Columbus, Ohio
- List of people from Dayton, Ohio
- List of people from Shaker Heights, Ohio
- List of people from Toledo, Ohio
- List of people from Youngstown, Ohio
- List of Ohio suffragists
