= List of people from Ashtabula, Ohio =

This is a list of people who were born in, have been residents of, or have been otherwise closely associated with the city of Ashtabula, Ohio, United States, and its surrounding metropolitan area, including Ashtabula County.

- Chester Hardy Aldrich (1862–1924), governor of Nebraska
- Brian James Anderson (born 1972), baseball pitcher
- Isaac Arthur, board of elections chairman and science communicator
- Jarrod Bunch (born 1968), football player
- Charles E. Burchfield (1893–1967), artist
- Charles Case (1817–1883), U.S. representative
- Tammy Cochran (born 1972), singer
- Anthony Colucci (born 1991), college football coach
- Betsy Mix Cowles (1810–1876), feminist and abolitionist
- Edwin Cowles, newspaperman
- William R. Daley, former owner of MLB's Cleveland Indians
- Charles DeBarber, a cyber intelligence analyst on CBS's Hunted (2017 TV series)
- Danica Dillon (born 1987), pornographic actress
- Edward Mason Eggleston, painter and commercial illustrator
- Wallace Wilson Graham, Wisconsin legislator and lawyer
- Joshua Reed Giddings (1795–1864), politician
- Francis Joseph Hall (1857–1933), theologian
- Al Humphrey, Major League Baseball player and Ohio law enforcement officer
- Robert Lighthizer, 18th United States Trade Representative
- Jesse Fuller McDonald (1858–1942), civil engineer, surveyor
- Ken Meyer (1925–2016), football coach
- Urban F. Meyer (born 1964), football coach, sportscaster
- Danielle Nicolet (born 1973), actress
- Don Novello (born 1943), actor and comedian
- Maila Nurmi (1922–2008), actress
- Charles F. Osborn, Wisconsin politician, lawyer and jurist
- Babe Parnell, National Football League player
- Pete Rasmus (1906–1975), athlete
- Connie Schultz, Pulitzer Prize-winning author
- Louis C. Shepard (1841–1919), Union Navy sailor
- T-Bone Slim (1880–1942), songwriter, hobo, IWW labor activist
- Freddie Smith (born 1988), soap opera actor, Days Of Our Lives
- John Spano, former owner of the New York Islanders
- Platt Rogers Spencer (1800–1864), teacher, penmanship innovator
- Andrew Tombes, Hollywood actor
- Albion W. Tourgée (1838–1905), soldier, lawyer, judge, novelist, diplomat
- Matthew Turner (1825–1909), shipbuilder
- Benjamin Wade (1800–1878), U.S. senator
- Decius Wade (1835–1905), the "father of Montana jurisprudence"
- Mark Wagner (born 1954), professional baseball player, Detroit Tigers, Oakland A's, Texas Rangers; Triple A coach

In addition, two crew members lost on the SS Edmund Fitzgerald, Karl A. Peckol and Paul M. Rippa, were from Ashtabula.
