= Nobody's Victim =

2019 non-fiction book

Nobody's Victim: Fighting Psychos, Stalkers, Pervs, and Trolls
- First edition cover
- Author: Carrie Goldberg; Jeannine Amber
- Language: English
- Subject: Sexual violence
- Publisher: Plume
- Publication date: August 13, 2019
- Publication place: United States
- Pages: 304
- ISBN: 9780525533771
- Website: www.nobodys-victim.com

Nobody's Victim: Fighting Psychos, Stalkers, Pervs, and Trolls is a 2019 book by Carrie Goldberg, co-written with Jeannine Amber. It describes incidents of sexual violence experienced by Goldberg's clients and herself, as well as other famous cases. The acts of violence include rape and sexual assault, revenge porn, "doxing" (posting personal information online), "swatting" (false reports to law enforcement that cause emergency responses), "sextortion" (sexual extortion), and abusive messages. Goldberg categorizes perpetrators as "assholes", "psychos", "pervs" or "trolls" depending on their nature, though "assholes" was omitted in the book's subtitle to avoid profanity.

Some of Goldberg's cases received previous media coverage, including that of a boyfriend who harassed his girlfriend online, posing as her ex-partners, and escalated the abuse after the relationship ended. There was national reporting on a man whose ex-partner incited 1,000 men via Grindr to approach his home under the pretense of offering hardcore sex. Goldberg's case against the New York City Department of Education for their schools' handling of student reports of rape also received such attention. She also represented five women who were sexually abused by Harvey Weinstein, a topic covered in Nobody's Victim.

Throughout the book, Goldberg recounts her "psycho ex", who harassed her for a year. She was vulnerable when she first met him as she had recently been date raped by a doctor who sutured a swastika into her buttocks—Goldberg had not previously spoken about this experience publicly, but was urged to by Amber. Though worried about doing so, Goldberg was inspired by clients who trusted her with their stories. Nobody's Victim was met with positive critical reception, receiving praise for the importance of the subject matter.

== Synopsis ==
Nobody's Victim has an introduction, nine chapters and a conclusion. It is written by Carrie Goldberg, who runs an American law firm specializing in sexual violence. She has a typology for people involved in such activity, who are mostly male. "Assholes" mistreat vulnerable people for financial gain or through indifference; "psychos" stalk and intimidate their targets; "pervs" enjoy non-consensual sex acts; and "trolls" enjoy causing suffering with the protection of anonymity. Throughout the book, she mentions her "psycho ex", who spent a year sending her harassing messages, threats of violence and posting sexual images and videos of her (taken without her knowledge) online. He harassed her family, colleagues and judges, and filed a frivolous lawsuit that cost her $30,000 in legal fees.

In "Sleeping with the Enemy", Goldberg documents the intimate partner violence faced by social worker Francesca Rossi at the hands of the "psycho" Juan Thompson, who was fired as a journalist for falsifying reports. During their relationship, Thompson was impersonating Rossi's ex-partners with harassing messages, a fake lawsuit, and revenge porn. For nine months after their breakup, Thompson's harassment included contacting around 50 family members, creating fake accounts for Rossi, doxing her, and swatting under her name. Police declined to take action until a bomb threat that led to a sentence of five years in prison.

"Swipe Right for Stalking" recounts Matthew Herrick's lawsuit against Grindr, a dating app for men who have sex with men. Herrick's ex-partner Oscar Juan Carlos Gutierrez impersonated Herrick on Grindr, saying he wanted violent rape fantasy sex. Over 1,000 men were lured to Herrick's home in the year before Gutierrez was arrested. Though other dating apps banned Gutierrez, Grindr did not. Goldberg and Herrick sued Grindr for negligence, but a judge found that they were not liable due to Section 230 of the Communications Decency Act (CDA). A Second Circuit appeal was also declined.

"Assholes in Charge" is about a 17-year-old girl who was suspended from her dance team after reporting that her ex-boyfriend was distributing non-consensual pornography of her. The school did not enforce their Title IX requirement to investigate sexual harassment. Though the girl was eventually permitted back in her team, after missing a college scholarship opportunity, she continued to be sexually harassed at school. In "Girls' Lives Matter", Goldberg recounts how a 13-year-old girl was violently raped by a student who circulated footage of the event, and was then told by the vice principal not to attend school. Goldberg reached a settlement with the New York City Department of Education relating to her and two other girls of color—a disabled child who was suspended by her school after being raped, and a girl who was denied a school transfer after being sexually assaulted.

"Godwin's Law" is about Goldberg's early legal career: after graduating from Vassar College, she became a caseworker for New York's Selfhelp, working with Holocaust survivors. While at Selfhelp, she studied law at night school and began working in guardianship law. "Profiteers of Pain" is about revenge porn, starting with Goldberg's account of her "psycho ex". She then discusses "assholes" such as Dharun Ravi—whose non-consensual filming of a roommate having sex led to the roommate's suicide, and Hunter Moore—who ran a website dedicated to posting non-consensual pornography and doxing those featured. In "When Troll Armies Attack", Goldberg gives examples of "trolls" who commit abuse online, such as Gamergate participants, The Daily Stormer readers and "RIP trolls" that taunt families of suicide victims. The online disinhibition effect and mob psychology contribute to their behavior, Goldberg writes.

The next chapter is "Porn Troll Sex Police". Goldberg recalls a client who lived with her parents due to harassment; a decade earlier, aged 18, she had been given alcohol by porn producers who lied that the footage would not be published online. Her parents paid producers for the copyright so websites would remove the video, though footage continued to circulate. Goldberg draws comparison to GirlsDoPorn, where women responding to modeling adverts were coerced into pornography over threat of having their travel home rescinded, lied to about the footage's distribution, and then doxed. Another "porn troll", Goldberg says, is the person behind Porn Wikileaks—a website to dox professional pornographic actors.

"Power Pervs" opens with a sextortion case in which a 17-year-old girl was groomed to strip on a Skype call. In sextortion cases where police decline to act, Goldberg may track the abusers and send cease and desist letters. The chapter also describes workplace sexual harassment, including Goldberg's experience in a warehouse job that led to an eating disorder and her suspension from college. Goldberg describes how abuse by Harvey Weinstein began the #MeToo movement, in which women shared experiences of sexual violence. She represented five clients abused by Weinstein, including an early accuser whose case was abandoned by the district attorney.

"~~Conclusion~~ Where We Begin", reveals Goldberg's motivation to start a law firm. She was raped on a first date with a doctor and, during the act, he stitched a swastika into her buttocks. When she met her "psycho ex", he described plans to kill the doctor. After they broke up, the ex-boyfriend contacted Goldberg's family and ex-partners with details about the rape. This began his year of harassment against her. While standing on a cliff over Galway Bay, Ireland, Goldberg contemplated suicide, but decided she would try to change her life within a year. She engrossed herself in representing clients and defending herself. By fighting abusers, she no longer saw herself as a victim.

== Background ==
On August 13, 2019, Nobody's Victim was published in the United States by Plume; it was published by Virago Press in the United Kingdom two days later. In an interview with The Daily World, Goldberg said that the book was important because it raises the issue of legislation being outdated in the internet age, assigns "shame and blame" to perpetrators rather than victims, and highlights how internet companies could make the choice to prevent their platforms being used for harassment.

=== Writing ===
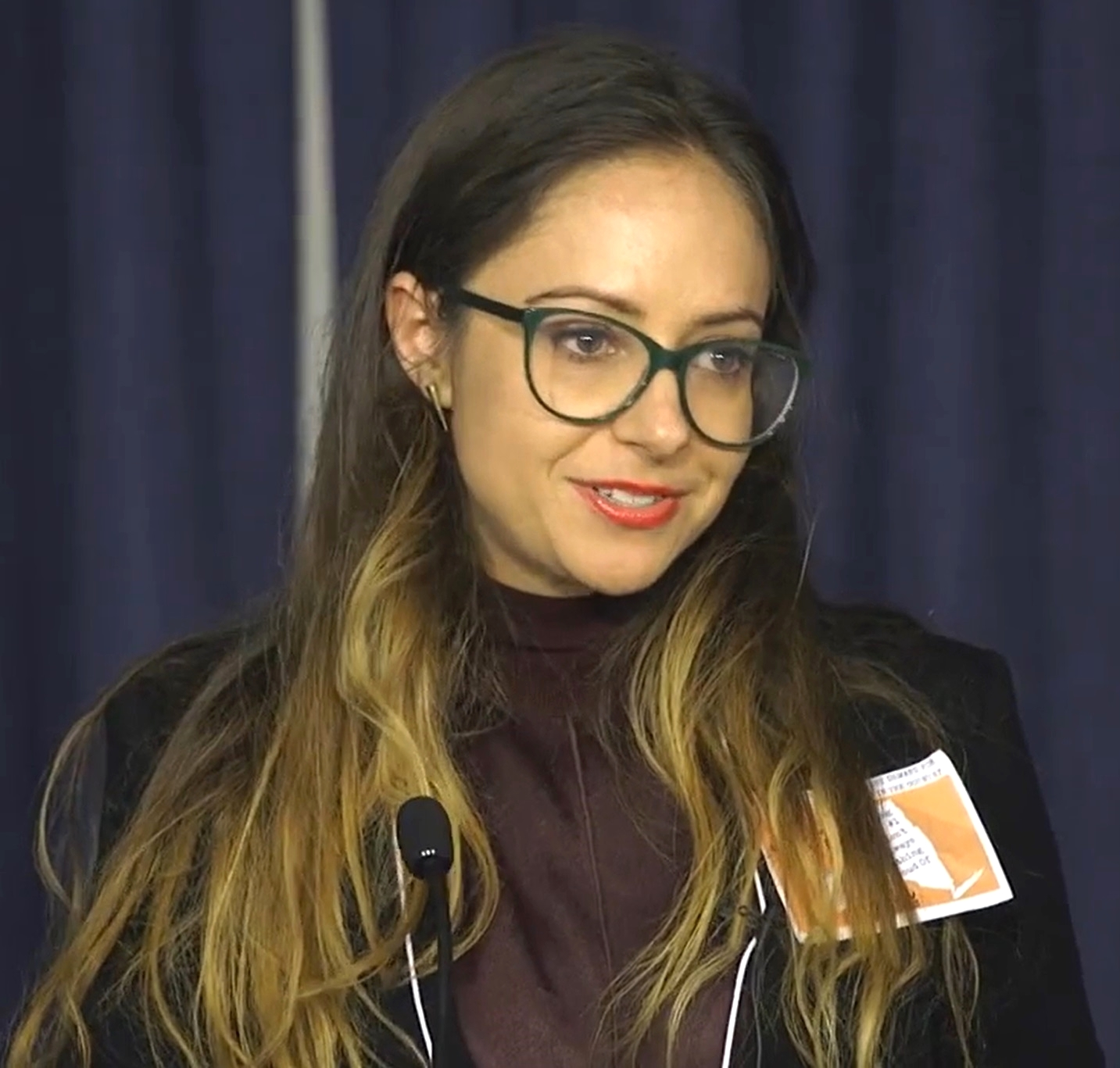
Author Carrie Goldberg in 2018

The book was co-written by Goldberg with the journalist Jeannine Amber. Goldberg said that writing the book was empowering and she was proud of it, but that she had discomfort and fear over revealing personal details from her life. The final chapter expands on the story she had previously given journalists about her initial motivation for setting up a law firm, by adding context about the doctor who raped and assaulted her. She did not initially plan to make this information public, but Amber pressed her on why she was so depressed and vulnerable when she met her "psycho ex". After Goldberg told her, Amber encouraged her to include it. Goldberg initially objected on the grounds that it was too personal, may upset her family and could damage her law firm's reputation. Though her family had been told the story by her "psycho ex", she had not spoken to them directly about it.

The example set by Goldberg's clients inspired her to include her own story of sexual violence. These clients had entrusted her with not only "the most personal details of their stories", but also the retelling of these details in publicly filed legal documents; she asked, "if they're being so willing and so trusting to expose themselves in order to advance their case and advance the law, then what am I doing if I'm not following that same model?" Goldberg said that trauma could be "a gift", as people can "learn from it and be fueled by it"; without it, she may have been content as middle management and too afraid to pursue a more rewarding and challenging position.

Goldberg wrote some of the book in her hometown of Aberdeen, Washington, while staying with her parents; this is where she conceived of the title Nobody's Victim. The subtitle originally listed "assholes" as the first group that Goldberg was "fighting", but her publisher recommended against the use of profanity in the title. Speaking to Mother Jones, Goldberg discussed how her classification of people as "assholes", "psychos", "pervs" and "trolls" is useful in understanding the people and selecting a response to them: for instance, a cease and desist letter may be ineffective on a "psycho" but effective on a "troll". The typologies overlap, however, and each group has a "raging need for power and control".

=== Legal cases ===
Several of the cases Goldberg describes in the book had received previous media coverage. Matthew Herrick's case drew national media attention for both the harassment he faced and the potential legal implications of suing Grindr; the lawsuit was supported by the Electronic Privacy Information Center (EPIC) but opposed by the Electronic Frontier Foundation (EFF), American Civil Liberties Union (ACLU) and Center for Democracy and Technology (CDT). Legal experts on both sides said that their position protected privacy; they disagreed on whether Grindr's moral responsibilities should also be legal ones. Some opposition cited the expense of monitoring content or possible consequences to the freedom of the internet.

The disgraced former journalist Juan Thompson received coverage in 2017 when he was charged and later pled guilty, as did Francesca Rossi's court statement about his abuse. Rossi later became a psychotherapist with specialism in digital violence. The lawsuit in "Girls' Lives Matter" garnered national coverage in 2016, with media outlets focusing on concerns of racism and misogyny within the legal system and New York schools' incident reporting processes. The sexual abuse committed by Harvey Weinstein received widespread media attention over a number of years as part of the #MeToo movement. It sparked many revelations about famous figures committing sexual violence, in what was dubbed the "Weinstein effect". Throughout the criminal prosecution cases, Goldberg gave media statements on behalf of her clients. In 2020, Weinstein was sentenced to 23 years in prison.

== Reception ==
In The New York Times, Kate Bolick praised the book's prose style as "both take-no-prisoners and warmly gregarious", which lightens the tone of the "gut-wrenching" cases as well as making the legal context more accessible to readers. Bolick found Goldberg's central case that "sexual privacy is a right that should be protected by federal law" to be persuasive, but said that the book could have omitted mention of cases other than Goldberg's that have received other coverage.

Though finding it hard to read in the context of #MeToo and revelations about Jeffrey Epstein's child sex trafficking, Andi Zeisler of Bitch wrote that the book "makes clear that the world needs a lot more attorneys like" Goldberg. Zeisler found the prose "sharp and engaging", but commented that Goldberg does not address possible side-effects of advocating for victims' rights, such as the chilling effect that Stop Enabling Sex Traffickers Act has had on consensual sex work.

Kirkus Reviews found the book to be performing "an important service" in publicizing cases of abuses, and hoped that it would "spark change". Publishers Weekly called it "an illuminating and significant window into the present state of victims' rights", suggesting it as a useful resource for sufferers of abuse. Terri Schlichenmeyer of the Guam Daily Post said that the book's "between-the-lines advice" through concrete examples of abuse left "a sense of anguish lingering", but still believed the book was "empowering and comforting".

Refinery29's Angelica Malin and Alicia Lansom listed it in their article "13 Books By Successful Women That'll Actually Help Your Career", describing it as a potentially defining book of the #MeToo movement. Frannie Jackson of Paste similarly recommended the book as an "essential read" in the era of #MeToo, and Esquire's Adrienne Westenfeld said it was "required reading" in the modern day, wherein "Goldberg gives voice to the legions who have experienced unthinkable violence". Courtney Eathorne reviewed the book in Booklist as a #MeToo-related book that educates readers on their legal rights, praising it as "engrossing and unique" as well as galvanizing.
