= Wallace Graham =

Wallace Graham may refer to:

- Wallace H. Graham (1910–1996), Physician to the President
- Wallace Graham (judge) (1848–1917), Canadian judge
- Wallace Wilson Graham (1815-1898), American politician and lawyer
