= Casting couch =

Soliciting sex for employment in entertainment

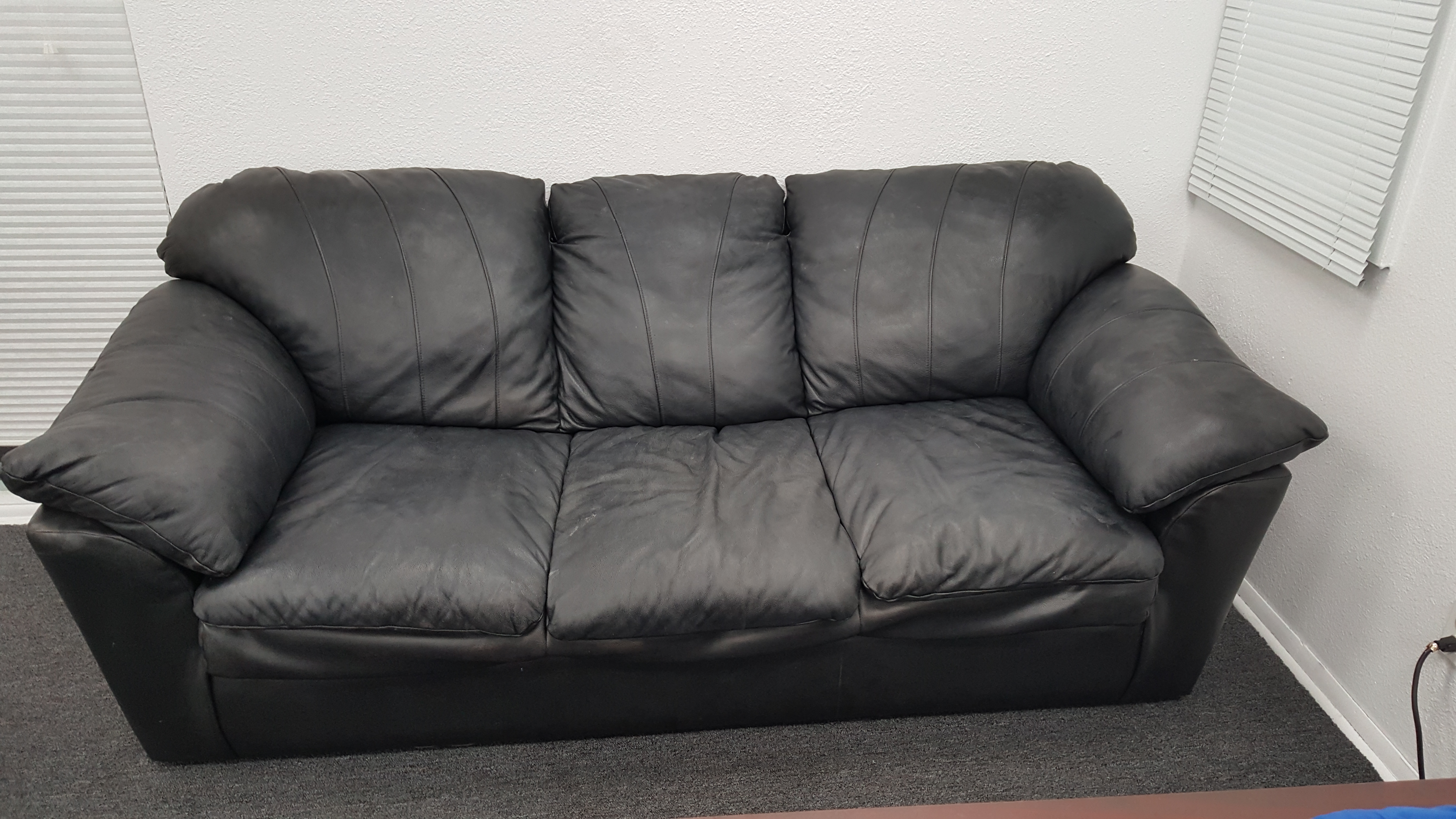
A physical couch on the set of the pornography website Backroom Casting Couch

The casting couch is a euphemism for the practice of soliciting sexual favors from a job applicant in exchange for employment in the entertainment industry, primarily acting roles. The practice is illegal in the United States. Predominantly male casting directors and film producers use the casting couch to extract sex from aspiring actors in Hollywood, Bollywood, Broadway, and other segments of the industry. The term casting couch originally referred to physical couches in the casting office, but is now a metonym for the phenomenon as a whole. Depictions of casting couch sexual encounters have also become a genre of pornography.

== Legality ==
The casting couch is illegal under United States and especially Californian law. In the United States, the majority of lawsuits related to the practice are settled, resulting in a lack of case law.

== Etymology ==
In The Atlantic, linguist Ben Zimmer described the casting couch as "a metonym for the skewed sexual politics of show business", which has been normalized into a cliché due to the prevalence of sexually aggressive men with positions of authority in Hollywood cinema and Broadway theatre.

== Economics ==
According to economists Thomas Borcherding and Darren Filson, the high risk and returns in Hollywood cinema encourage the casting couch phenomenon. The possibility of high returns incentivizes unestablished actors to accept minimal wages in exchange for roles. With the exception of a few extremely talented actors, producers are unable to evaluate the aptitude of the vast majority of qualified actors due to uncertainty. As a result, some actors give sexual favors to producers to obtain a perceived advantage in the casting; the casting couch functions as a counterpayment that effectively reduces their wages. This creates a conflict of interest in which corrupt producers substitute aptitude (an unquantifiable variable) with sexual activity in their decision-making.

Actors who submit to the casting couch are not guaranteed roles, as there is an abundance of actors who participate in the practice. An actor's decision of whether to provide sex is comparable to the prisoner's dilemma, and results in a tragedy of the commons in which sex is needed to obtain film roles from producers who demand it, but fails to provide an advantage relative to other actors who offer sexual favors. The practice is illegal in the United States and likely involves some degree of sexual exploitation or sexual harassment. Actors who do not participate in the casting couch are subject to externalities, including reduced employability.

Borcherding and Filson argue that the casting couch became less prominent after the Hollywood studio system, which enforced long-term employment contracts for actors, was eliminated on antitrust grounds in United States v. Paramount Pictures, Inc. (1948). Long-term contracts gave producers stronger bargaining power, which was used by corrupt producers to extract sex from actors more effectively.

== Pornography ==
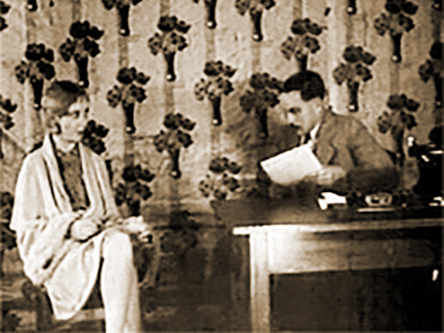
An actress and a casting director in The Casting Couch (c. 1924)

The Casting Couch (c. 1924), a classic title in the stag film genre, was an early depiction of the casting couch as a pornographic trope that later became mundane as it grew in popularity. In the sixteen-minute film, a casting director tells a young actress to wear a swimsuit during an audition, spies on her in a voyeuristic manner while she undresses in a different room, and enters the room to solicit sex from her. The actress initially rebuffs his advances with disgust, but returns to the director after taking advice from a book titled How to Become a Movie Star. She performs fellatio and vaginal intercourse in exchange for a role in his film; the latter takes place on a couch. The Casting Couch concludes with an intertitle that states, "the only way to become a star is to get under a good director and work your way up". Zimmer credited the film with popularizing the term casting couch.

The trend of casting couch scenarios used on pornography websites began with Backroom Casting Couch in 2007.

The website GirlsDoPorn, which operated between 2009 and 2020, was described as a casting couch site. The depicted women were manipulated, coerced, lied to, given marijuana or other drugs or physically forced to have sex, according to the accounts of victims and material from a lawsuit against the company. Six people involved in the website were charged with sex trafficking by force, fraud and coercion in November 2019.

== See also ==
- Girlfriend experience
- MeToo movement
- Sexual abuse in the American film industry
- Sexual capital
- Transactional sex
