= GirlsDoPorn =

Former American pornographic website

- Industry: Pornography
- Founded: 2009
- Founder: Michael Pratt
- Defunct: 2020
- Headquarters: San Diego, United States
- Key people: Michael Pratt; Matthew Wolfe; Andre Garcia; Valerie Moser; Douglas Wiederhold
- Owner: Michael Pratt; Matthew Wolfe

GirlsDoPorn was an American pornographic website active from 2009 to 2020. In October and November 2019, six people involved with the website were charged on counts of sex trafficking by force, fraud, and coercion. In December 2019, two more individuals were charged with obstruction of sex trafficking enforcement. The website was removed in January 2020 after 22 victims won the civil case against the company. According to the United States Department of Justice, the website and its sister website GirlsDoToys generated over $17 million in revenue. Videos were featured on GirlsDoPorn.com as well as pornography aggregate websites such as Pornhub, where the channel reached the top 20 most viewed, with approximately 680 million views.

Pornography produced by the company, which was based in San Diego, California, was in the style of a "casting couch", featuring women who were not professional pornographic actors. Lawsuits and other testimony describe practices by GirlsDoPorn in detail. Women who responded to fake modeling advertisements on Craigslist were put into contact with 'reference girls' who pretended to have had positive experiences with the company. Participants could be promised between $2,000 and $6,000 for 30 minutes of sex on camera. However, filming could last up to nine hours and, according to an ex-employee, 50% of women were not paid the amount they agreed on. Verbal promises were given that the videos would never be released on the Internet or in the United States, only to independent video stores in Australia, New Zealand or South America, or to private buyers. When participants reached San Diego, they were made to sign contracts that did not mention the name "GirlsDoPorn". The filming process was violent: the Department of Justice said that "some were sexually assaulted and in at least one case raped". Release of participants' personal information and online harassment accompanied the videos. Subjects of the videos have reported adverse effects including suicidal ideation, physical harassment, and the loss of jobs and accommodation.

A lawsuit filed in 2016 alleged "intentional misrepresentation, fraudulent concealment, unlawful and fraudulent business practices, and the intentional infliction of emotional distress" on the parts of New Zealand nationals Michael Pratt (co-owner) and Matthew Wolfe (co-owner and cameraman), as well as Andre Garcia (pornographic actor). In January 2020, the plaintiffs received damages of $12.775 million, as well as ownership to videos they featured in. However, they had yet to receive any money by February 2022. In December 2023, Aylo (owners of Pornhub) agreed to pay a $1.8 million government fine plus compensation to victims. Pratt, Garcia, and Wolfe were sentenced to 27, 20, and 14 years in custody, respectively; others involved in GirlsDoPorn have also been convicted.

== History ==
GirlsDoPorn was a pornography website owned by Michael Pratt (born 1982, New Zealand), who also worked as the cameraman and editor. Matthew Wolfe (born 1982 or 1983, New Zealand) was co-owner and cameraman. He is also a childhood friend of Pratt's. Douglas Wiederhold and Ruben Andre Garcia (born 1986 or 1987) were the main male pornographic actors for the company. Lawyer Aaron Sadock began working for the company in 2012, while cameraman Theodore "Teddy" Gyi filmed around 120 videos between 2015 and 2017. Pratt began planning and shooting for GirlsDoPorn in 2007. The website was launched in 2009.

Pratt began working in the pornographic industry around the year 2000, after graduating from high school. He initially launched the affiliate porn websites Wicked Movies, Kute Kittens, and TeenieFlixxx, the last an affiliate of the existing website ExploitedTeens, all of which produced pornography in the same style that GirlsDoPorn later would.

In 2007, Pratt moved to the United States to film pornography. Between 2007 and 2012, Wiederhold worked with Pratt, the two filming videos of Wiederhold having sex in hotel rooms with women who were not in the porn industry. These videos formed the basis of the videos first released by GirlsDoPorn. In 2010, Wiederhold and Pratt created the MILF pornography website MomPOV, which had a Vanuatu domain but operates from Las Vegas.

In 2011, Wolfe moved from New Zealand to the United States. Wolfe was involved with Pratt's work from 2008 onwards. Over 100 videos were filmed by Wolfe for GirlsDoPorn between 2011 and 2019.

GirlsDoPorn was active during a period of growing consumption of 'casting couch' Internet pornography. Such pornography is often filmed in hotel rooms or office setup with minimal crew and may feature women who have not previously filmed pornography and are given money on-camera. In the case of GirlsDoPorn, their homepage boasted, "You will not find these girls on any other website". The women would be asked about their sex lives on camera, and sometimes videos included them reading parts of their contracts aloud. The male performer's face was never shown in the videos. Vice reported that "the current iteration of the 'casting couch' trope is largely based on" Backroom Casting Couch, a series that started in 2007 by a pornographer who plays a role of "deceiving" the women featured in his videos, but in actuality all of the women featured in the series are established porn performers.

Over a dozen U.S. and foreign companies were associated with GirlsDoPorn throughout its lifespan. In 2011, GT Group Limited, a company referenced in the Panama Papers, was listed as its parent corporation. The Sydney Morning Herald reported in 2011 that GT Group Limited was founded by a man associated with arms smuggling, drug gangs, and tax fraud. By 2017, GirlsDoPorn's parent corporation was Oh Well Media Limited, a company based in Port Vila, Vanuatu, which is an offshore tax haven according to the San Diego Reader. The company BLL Media Inc. was referred to in contracts signed with some women who worked for the company.

GirlsDoPorn.com charged a subscription of $30 per month; it published a roughly 45-minute video on a weekly schedule. The official site Girls-Do-Porn.com posted short, free extracts of the videos. The company had a spin-off site, GirlsDoToys, launched by Pratt and Wolfe in 2014. In January 2017, GirlsDoPorn.com was the 33,949th-most-visited website in the United States, receiving roughly 1.2 million visitors between November and December 2016, including approximately 84,000 who were visiting the website for the first time. According to the United States Department of Justice, the websites GirlsDoPorn and GirlsDoToys generated over $17 million in revenue. Pratt was the sole recipient of profits from the websites. Upon filing bankruptcy in 2018, Pratt estimated his income to be greater than $60,000 per month, and reported over $134,000 in back taxes.

The company received tabloid attention in 2013 and 2014 when it was reported that two beauty pageant models for Miss Teen USA were the subjects of videos on the website; as a consequence of this being made public, the models ceased connection with the beauty pageants. Some women who filmed videos with GirlsDoPorn later became professional pornographic actors, including Emily Willis, who said she filmed two videos with the website after dating Garcia for a month. Willis said that she was aware that she was being lied to but wanted to enter the industry regardless.

In a court testimony in October 2019, Wolfe said that GirlsDoPorn continued to recruit new women, whose contracts did not mention the name of the website. According to Ars Technica, amid investigation into the owners of the website, GirlsDoPorn.com went offline in January 2020.

== Content on other websites ==
In addition to being released on GirlsDoPorn.com, videos produced by the company were also released on websites that aggregated pornographic videos such as Pornhub, XVideos, and YouPorn. They were viewed over 800 million times on these websites, including roughly 680 million views on Pornhub, where GirlsDoPorn was amongst the top 20 most viewed channels. Overall, court documents found that videos produced by the website were watched over 1 billion times, and pirated versions were viewed hundreds of millions of times. The second-most viewed video on Pornhub in 2014 was of GirlsDoPorn.

GirlsDoPorn's channel was removed from Pornhub in October 2019, which journalists at Daily Dot and Motherboard said was a slow response to the incident. Additionally, the videos could still be found afterwards unofficially on Pornhub's website. Motherboard found that the digital fingerprinting that Pornhub uses to remove duplicates of removed videos, Vobile, prevented them from uploading some identical or nearly-identical clips of GirlsDoPorn videos, but also did not remove many slight variants on the footage. In 2023, a spokesperson for Aylo said the company "deeply regrets" having hosted GirlsDoPorn content.

Lawsuits filed against Pornhub's parent company, Aylo (then MindGeek) focus on its partnership with GirlsDoPorn and alleged hosting of such videos from 2011 to December 2020 despite repeated requests for removal by subjects. Following this period, Vice reported that XVideos, XNXX, and Spankbang had removed many GirlsDoPorn videos on their sites and ensured that the search term "Girls Do Porn" returned no results.

Discussion website Reddit had a forum, "r/girlsdoporn", which began in 2013 and was dedicated to posting links and videos as well as the identities of the women featured on GirlsDoPorn. In October 2019, amidst a lawsuit against GirlsDoPorn, moderators removed most content on the subreddit and announced it to be in hiatus. Reddit removed the subreddit shortly afterwards. The forum had approximately 99,000 accounts subscribed to it at the time of its closure. In 2014, GirlsDoPorn.com launched an Internet forum. The company was also active on Instagram, where posts would brag about how young the actors involved were.

One woman told Motherboard that, as of 2021, Twitter was the host of most continuing harassment against her, with users contacting her employers with links to the video she featured in; YouTube also declined to remove a video harassing her for five months until contacted by Motherboard. A YouTube video that harassed four women in relation to GirlsDoPorn, with comments giving their identifying information, reached roughly 2 million views.

== Reported practices ==
Details of practices by the company have been documented in lawsuits, mainstream media and court testimonies by employees of the company. One attorney pursuing legal actions reported that he and his co-counsel communicated with 150 women who said that they were misled during their experience filming videos for GirlsDoPorn. A lawsuit filed in 2016 contained information from 22 plaintiffs. Six further women who were not part of the lawsuit told NBC 7 San Diego journalists in 2019 that they had similar experiences.

=== Casting process ===
According to the 2016 lawsuit, GirlsDoPorn was associated with fake modeling websites such as BeginModeling, ModelingGigs, ModelingWork, and Bubblegum Casting. Advertisements for these websites were posted on Craigslist under college towns and localities spanning the US and Canada. Explore Talent was also used by them to find models. They requested applicants aged between 18 and 22, and provided forms asking for physical and personal information about applicants.

Michael Pratt, Matthew Wolfe and Andre Garcia often used aliases when dealing with the girls they recruited and never revealed their real names. Pratt would use names such as "Mike" and "Mark". Garcia mostly went by "Jonathan", and Wolfe used "Ben", "Joshua" and "Isaac" when doing the recruiting and subsequent filming. They would contact women who had applied and tell them that the job was not modeling, but having sex on camera. They claimed that the footage would be used only for DVDs sold to private buyers and independent video stores in Australia, New Zealand, or South America and would never be released online or in the United States in any form. There were instances where women were lured to San Diego under the false pretense of a clothed or nude modeling shoot if they declined initial offers to film pornography.

Some women were offered between $2,000 and $6,000 for 30 minutes of filming, consisting of five sexual positions lasting between five and seven minutes apiece. Women involved report frequent and persistent contact from the company before they agreed. Filming would take place in San Diego, California, and their travel expenses and accommodation would be paid for. Several women report that Garcia booked flights for them before they had fully committed.

Women who agreed were put into contact with a 'reference girl'. According to one such person, reference girls were hired to lie to the women and conceal information in order to convince them to agree to the job. They were paid between $25 and $200 per contact they persuaded. They would communicate via text or video call. Some women took months of convincing to agree. According to several of these women, reference girls would make false claims about distribution of the videos, saying that their ostensible videos had not been seen within the United States. One woman involved reported Garcia threatening to sue her after she attempted to withdraw before flying. Another reported a death threat against her and her family that included her address and Social Security number.

=== Filming process ===
Once in San Diego, women were met by employees who had signed non-disclosure agreements forbidding them from mentioning the name GirlsDoPorn. They were allegedly instructed to call the company Plus One Media, or deny that the videos produced would be published online. The women stayed in four-star hotels, where filming took place.

Women in the 2016 lawsuit were hurried to sign contracts written in hard-to-understand legal terminology, sometimes being told the contracts were needed for tax purposes. The contract did not mention "GirlsDoPorn" or even the fact that the video would be put on any website. The contracts involving the 22 plaintiffs also did not mention "GirlsDoPorn" anywhere in the entire document, as per court records. There were reports that company employees drank, smoked cannabis with them, or offered them cocaine. The civil case judgement also observed that the main male talent Garcia would offer the models drugs and/or alcohol before the shoot in order to calm their nerves and loosen up. He did this regardless of the age of the models. One woman described being given alcohol and the prescription drugs Xanax and oxycodone. An FBI complaint said that the company prevented the women from keeping copies of their contracts. In the lawsuit's 187-page proposed statement of decision, the release form is described as purposefully long and vague, written with an intent to obscure the true nature and character of the video's distribution.

Filming lasted up to nine hours, in contrast to the 30-minute shoot that the women were told to expect. Filming for GirlsDoToys took place during the same trips. GirlsDoPorn videos began with an interview in which the subject was asked personal and sexual questions after being coached on how to answer. Footage would be re-shot if the producers did not believe the performer looked enthusiastic. There were reports of Garcia being verbally abusive and Pratt using a gun to force the shoot to continue.

During sex, some women reportedly experienced vaginal bleeding, while another said that she vomited in her mouth and began choking due to the violence of the sex. Accounts of the women document that if they expressed pain or refused to continue, they were told that it was too late to withdraw, and in some cases the exit was physically blocked by the men. Some women were also threatened with cancellation of the return flight or being asked to pay back the flight and hotel costs if they tried to renege on filming or refused to shoot an additional scene.

The United States Department of Justice reported that "some [of the women] were sexually assaulted and in at least one case raped". It has been reported that Garcia had sex with some of the women before or after shooting, or in the midst of shooting, after asking the cameraman to leave. One woman said Garcia sexually assaulted her after she said she could not film due to menstruation—he forced a paint sponge into her vagina—and she was then forced to film.

Former employee Val Moser testified that only 50% of women received the amount of money they were promised. The court case found that women were frequently told that their pay would be reduced immediately after stripping naked, despite never being told that their pay was contingent. Another frequently used tactic was to cut pay after the scene was shot by citing body flaws even though the models had sent nude photos clearly showing whatever blemishes and tattoos they had. One woman was paid $400 after having been promised $2,000, and also locked out of the hotel room where she was expecting to stay. After the shoot she left the room because she was feeling upset and when she came back most of the money they had given her was gone. The envelope of money contained only a few $20s and a stack of $1s, totaling $400. Another was paid $2,500 rather than the promised $5,000, with an explanation that she appeared too old.

Additionally, women have alleged being lied to in various ways by Garcia to convince them to enter his apartment: in some cases, he said that the women should stay at his apartment before he drove them to the airport the next morning; in others, he feigned needing to stop at his apartment and suggested that the women should come inside briefly. One woman described that Pratt made her perform oral sex on him at gunpoint in a car and then continued to assault her at his house.

=== Outcomes ===
Videos were published online around a month after recording. Some women filmed on multiple occasions, with threats of their first video's release used to coerce them to make further videos. One woman reported that naked photos she had sent in communication over the Craigslist advert were also published. Some women reported experiencing sexually transmitted infections from sexual contact with Garcia. Personal information of the women was posted online, including contact details, former high schools and places of employment, and both their and their families' full names, social media profiles and home addresses. Many women contacted GirlsDoPorn employees to complain. According to court documents, the company's response varied. In some cases they claimed that they would attempt to remove the video; in others, they referred to Panakos Law, which would send cease and desist requests to the complainant. There was testimony that Panakos Law also sent cease-and-desist requests to women who contacted other websites asking for the video of them to be removed.

The names of hundreds of women who filmed videos for GirlsDoPorn were published on Porn Wikileaks, a website specifically set up to dox porn actors. The 2016 lawsuit alleged that the website's domain was transferred to an email address known to be owned by Pratt in November 2015, and an FBI affidavit describes the site as "a website connected to Pratt". Photos exclusively shared with GirlsDoPorn were found on Porn Wikileaks. Judge Kevin Enright found it "more likely than not" that Pratt, Wolfe, and Garcia were instigators of the online harassment of one of the women who filmed with them. Pratt controlled the website until August 2016; it was purchased in August 2019 by pornographic film studio Bang Bros and closed down. Donny Long (legal name Donald Carlos Seoane), who was also connected to Porn Wikileaks, was arrested in December 2023 over human trafficking charges that were unrelated to the GirlsDoPorn federal criminal case.

Women involved in filming reported that their family, friends, and colleagues were sent text messages with links to videos or GIFs of them having sex when the videos they made were published online. The incidents led to women involved losing jobs or accommodation and leaving college or being disowned by family. A high school teacher lost her job several years after filming when the principal was emailed the video in which she appeared. Others reported experiencing panic attacks, depression, self-harming and, in at least four cases, suicidal ideation. One woman lost contact with family after a video interspersing GirlsDoPorn footage with her childhood ballet performance was published under the woman's real name. Another reported that, despite changing her name, she was assaulted in 2023 over a video filmed 10 years earlier and that men continually harassed her at her home.

== Investigation and legal action ==
=== Investigation ===
In June 2016, lawyer Carrie Goldberg contracted the cybersecurity and cyber intelligence firm Fortalice, LLC to investigate the identities of the owners of GirlsDoPorn. Intelligence professional Charles DeBarber identified Wolfe and Pratt as the owners of GirlsDoPorn, not an offshore entity linked to the Panama Papers in Vanuatu, and their main recruiter/male performer as Ruben Andre Garcia. DeBarber would later testify at the 2019 civil trial regarding metadata proving Michael Pratt was posing online as a Jane Doe and contacting suspected Jane Does involved in the civil suit to gain information on the plaintiffs.

=== First lawsuit filing ===
In June 2016, four women filed a lawsuit in the San Diego Superior Court against Wolfe, Pratt, Garcia, and GirlsDoPorn. Six months later, the lawsuit had 14 plaintiffs; within a year, the number was 22. Plaintiffs were aged between 17 and 22 during recruiting of their videos for GirlsDoPorn and most of them were college students at the time of filming the video. 10 of the 22 plaintiffs reported that they wanted to leave at some point before or during the shoot but were forced to complete it. The plaintiffs testified on how the release of the videos adversely affected their college lives, career plans, and plans for having their own families. The plaintiffs requested more than $22 million in damages. The defendants stood accused of "intentional misrepresentation, fraudulent concealment, unlawful and fraudulent business practices, and the intentional infliction of emotional distress". Brian Holm was a lead attorney, with John O'Brien as co-counsel. Eventually the legal team of the 22 plaintiffs grew to include multiple law firms including Sanford Heisler Sharp LLP. Attorney Daniel Kaplan also represented GirlsDoPorn in the lawsuit.

=== Trials and charges ===
An initial trial date was set for March 8, 2018, but the trial was set back by several different delays. In January 2019, the judge set a tentative ruling that Wolfe, Pratt, and Garcia had engaged in "malice, fraud or oppression". The same day, Pratt filed for bankruptcy, and the case was put on hold. The bankruptcy judge deemed that Pratt had acted in bad faith, so the case resumed in early 2019. After further delay, trial began on August 20, 2019, lasting until November 2019. Kevin Enright served as the judge.

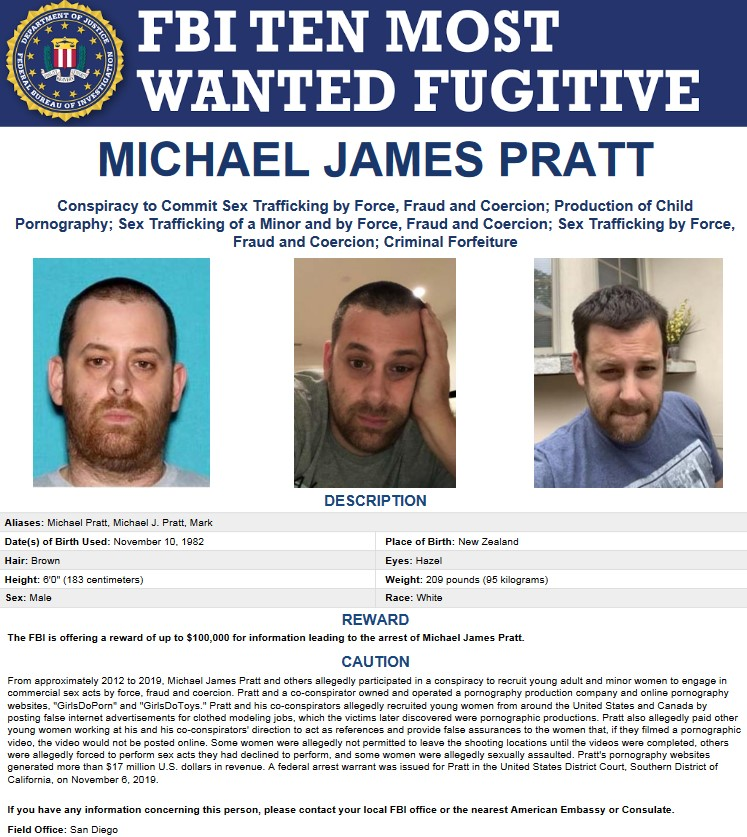
GirlsDoPorn website owner Michael James Pratt fled the United States in 2019. He was listed as one of the Ten Most Wanted Fugitives on September 7, 2022, and captured by Spanish National Police on December 21, 2022.

In September 2019, attorneys were told that Pratt had left the country. The following month, Garcia and Wolfe were arrested on charges of sex trafficking after a search warrant was executed by the FBI. Wolfe was denied bail in October 2019, and again in May 2020. In September 2020, Pratt was added to the FBI's wanted fugitives list. He was listed in the FBI Ten Most Wanted Fugitives in September 2022, with an offer of $100,000 for information that lead to his arrest. He replaced fugitive Jason Derek Brown, who was removed from the list for no longer meeting the list criteria. On December 21, 2022, Pratt was arrested in a hotel in Madrid, Spain by the Spanish National Police pursuant to an Interpol Red Notice. This followed assistance by U.S. Immigration and Customs Enforcement (ICE), who received a tip line lead. He was extradited and appeared in U.S. court in March 2024. Pratt's trial was scheduled to begin on September 2, 2025.

In November 2019, a federal indictment was unsealed naming three more individuals—Theodore Gyi, Valorie Moser, and Amberlyn Dee Nored—as defendants. Gyi had acted as a videographer. Moser was the administrative assistant who had worked for Pratt for almost three years. She had also testified on the plaintiffs' behalf in the trial. Nored had acted as a fake reference girl on Pratt's behalf. She had never shot a pornographic video for GirlsDoPorn or any other production. In her own declaration filed in the civil case court, Nored stated that she had acted as a reference for five to seven women. In November 2021, the U.S. Attorney's Office told the federal judge overseeing the criminal case that the sex trafficking charge against Amberlyn Dee Nored was being dismissed "to satisfy the ends of justice".

Pratt was charged with producing child pornography of a 16-year-old girl in 2012 and of sex trafficking of a minor; these charges were added against Wolfe in 2022. Additional charges for Pratt and the other five, based on events from 2013 to 2016, included conspiracy to commit sex trafficking by force, fraud, and coercion and sex trafficking by force, fraud, and coercion. On February 10, 2022, a superseding indictment was filed charging Pratt and Wolfe with additional charges of sex trafficking.

There are multiple reported cases of attempted disruption or obstruction during trials. Attorney Holm was harassed throughout the legal process, with fake gay porn images of him spread, and one woman testifying that she was paid to make repeated harassing phone calls to him by a GirlsDoPorn employee. He reported that harassing posts on social media and pornography blogs were made about himself, his wife and young daughter, and that a private investigator was hired to follow him.

In a separate case, brothers Fredrick Jimenez and Efrain Jimenez were charged in December 2019 for obstruction of sex trafficking enforcement. The complaint states that they tried to remove and destroy evidence related to the federal sex trafficking in October 2019. Fredrick Jimenez was an ex-employee of GirlsDoPorn. Prosecutors also collated evidence of witness harassment: a U.S. attorney found evidence that defendants called the plaintiffs to falsely pose as journalists. A witness alleged that a co-defendant offered her $1,000 in exchange for not testifying in the trial. FBI agents found a planned video script, "22 Whores + 5 Shady Lawyers VS GirlsDoPorn", which encouraged viewers to spread the real names of the plaintiffs.

=== Lawsuit outcomes ===
On January 2, 2020, the women in the trial were awarded $12.775 million in damages—$9.475 million for compensatory damages and $3.3 million in punitive damages. This is in addition to payment of their $8 million legal fees and $800,000 in costs. On January 9, Faith Devine was appointed receiver over the business and individual assets of the defendants. As of February 2022, the women are yet to receive any money. Furthermore, the women were given ownership rights to the videos they featured in. The ruling ordered defendants to remove all images and videos from websites under their control, and to take action to remove them from other websites.

In the injunction, the court ordered GirlsDoPorn to clearly state in bold and centered at the top of the first page of their model agreement that the video was going to be published on GirlsDoPorn.com. The verbal release must also show the model clearly stating the name of the website. Additionally, they were ordered in the future to state in recruitment postings that videos will be posted online, give participants copies of the contracts before arriving, and ensure that participants sign documents indicating that they understand their names or personal information may be used.

Later in January 2020, another woman sued the men involved with GirlsDoPorn with a similar case to the 22 previous plaintiffs. In February 2021, the woman was awarded a default judgement of almost $450,000.

In December 2020, Garcia pled guilty to federal charges of sex trafficking by force, fraud, and coercion. On June 14, 2021, Garcia was sentenced to 20 years in custody, more than the prosecutors' suggested 12.5 years and the 7 years sought by his defense team. He will also be on supervised release for 10 years following the end of his custodial term.

In January 2021, Gyi pleaded guilty to conspiracy to commit sex trafficking by force, fraud, and coercion; he lied to performers that their videos would not be posted on the Internet. He was sentenced to four years in prison on November 9, 2022. Six of his victims gave their impact statements during his sentencing hearing. In March 2023, Gyi was ordered to pay over $100,000 as restitution to two of his victims.

In April 2021, Moser pleaded guilty to conspiracy to commit sex trafficking by force, fraud, and coercion.. On December 12, 2025, Valorie Moser was sentenced to two years in prison followed by three years of supervised release.

In December 2021, the federal judge overseeing the criminal case ruled that the rights to all videos and images produced by GirlsDoPorn and GirlsDoToys be transferred to the victims who appeared in the footage. This order covered at least 402 women who were featured on the two websites.

On July 26, 2022, Wolfe plead guilty to the count of conspiracy to commit sex trafficking by force, fraud and coercion. He was sentenced to 14 years in prison on March 19, 2024. Pratt entered a not guilty plea on the same day.

In 2022, Domi Publications—the operator of MomPOV formerly owned by Pratt—sued two of the lawyers who defended GirlsDoPorn for malpractice, alleging that they declined a settlement of $16,000 a few weeks before the trial. According to the lawsuit, Wiederhold wanted a settlement and Pratt wanted to proceed to trial. Domi declared Chapter 7 bankruptcy and named the 22 Jane Does as creditors.

On January 24, 2023, cameraman Alexander Brian Foster was charged with one count of conspiracy to commit stalking and he pleaded guilty the same day. He admitted to filming around 100 videos for GirlsDoPorn and GirlsDoToys and creating the video "22 Whores + 5 Shady Lawyers VS GirlsDoPorn". He was facing a maximum of five years in prison. Foster was sentenced on April 28, 2023, to one year and one day in prison.

On June 21, 2023, Doug Wiederhold was indicted on the charges of conspiracy to sex trafficking and sex trafficking of five GirlsDoPorn models. The sealed indictment was then made public on September 14, 2023. He appeared in a San Diego Federal Court that day. Based on the charges listed in the indictment, Wiederhold faced a maximum sentence of life in prison if convicted.

On June 5, 2025, Pratt entered a guilty plea in court admitting to two charges—conspiracy to commit sex trafficking and sex trafficking of one adult victim (out of the 16 victims that he was charged with in the superseding indictment). On September 8, 2025, he was sentenced to 27 years in prison plus 10 years of supervised probation.

On January 30, 2026, the final defendant, Doug Wiederhold, was sentenced to four years in prison. As part of a plea deal, he had faced a maximum possible sentence of five years.

During sentencing, the prosecutor cited a text message from a victim in which she informed Wiederhold that her video had been posted online. Wiederhold denied knowing how the video was posted and subsequently ceased responding to her messages. The prosecutor also noted that Wiederhold continued working for GirlsDoPorn for nearly a year after this exchange.

In February 2026, Michael Pratt was ordered to pay the victims of GirlsDoPorn and GirlsDoToys a restitution of $75,568,283.47. The order also stated that Pratt no longer had the rights to use the videos or images of the models who were filmed for GirlsDoPorn or GirlsDoToys.

=== Aylo lawsuits ===
On December 16, 2020, 40 women involved with GirlsDoPorn filed a lawsuit against Aylo (then MindGeek)—a company that owns Pornhub, Tube8, and other pornography websites—for damages including distress, ostracization, trauma and attempted suicide. The lawsuit claims that MindGeek knew about the company's sex trafficking as early as 2009 and definitely by fall 2016, but continued to partner with GirlsDoPorn until the company became defunct. MindGeek featured GirlsDoPorn as a Content Partner and a member of the Viewshare Program. The lawsuit also alleges that MindGeek failed to remove GirlsDoPorn videos despite requests for removal by victims, as recently as December 2020. The plaintiffs sought $80 million in damages. The lawsuit follows a New York Times article about Pornhub and GirlsDoPorn, following which Pornhub began to remove videos from unverified users. On April 1, 2021, another 10 women joined the lawsuit against Mindgeek, bringing the total number of plaintiffs to 50. In October 2021, a court document reported that Aylo had settled the lawsuit, with the terms of the agreement not made public.

On September 8, 2023, a woman who filmed multiple videos for GirlsDoPorn filed a federal civil case against Aylo and its owners Ethical Capital Partners. The lawsuit claims that GirlsDoPorn was sustained by Aylo's use of its content and aggressive marketing strategies, from which Aylo financially profited. The plaintiff reported that Aylo threatened her with legal action after denying her repeated requests to remove non-consensual pornographic videos of her and continued to host videos of her after 2019. Another civil lawsuit against Aylo was filed in October 2023 by 62 women, represented by the same legal team as the 2020 lawsuit.

In December 2023, Aylo reached a deferred prosecution agreement whose terms included a $1.8 million fine, compensation to GirlsDoPorn victims who had not received compensation through other cases, and independent assessments into their content moderation process for three years.
