= Myke Cole =

American fantasy and science fiction writer

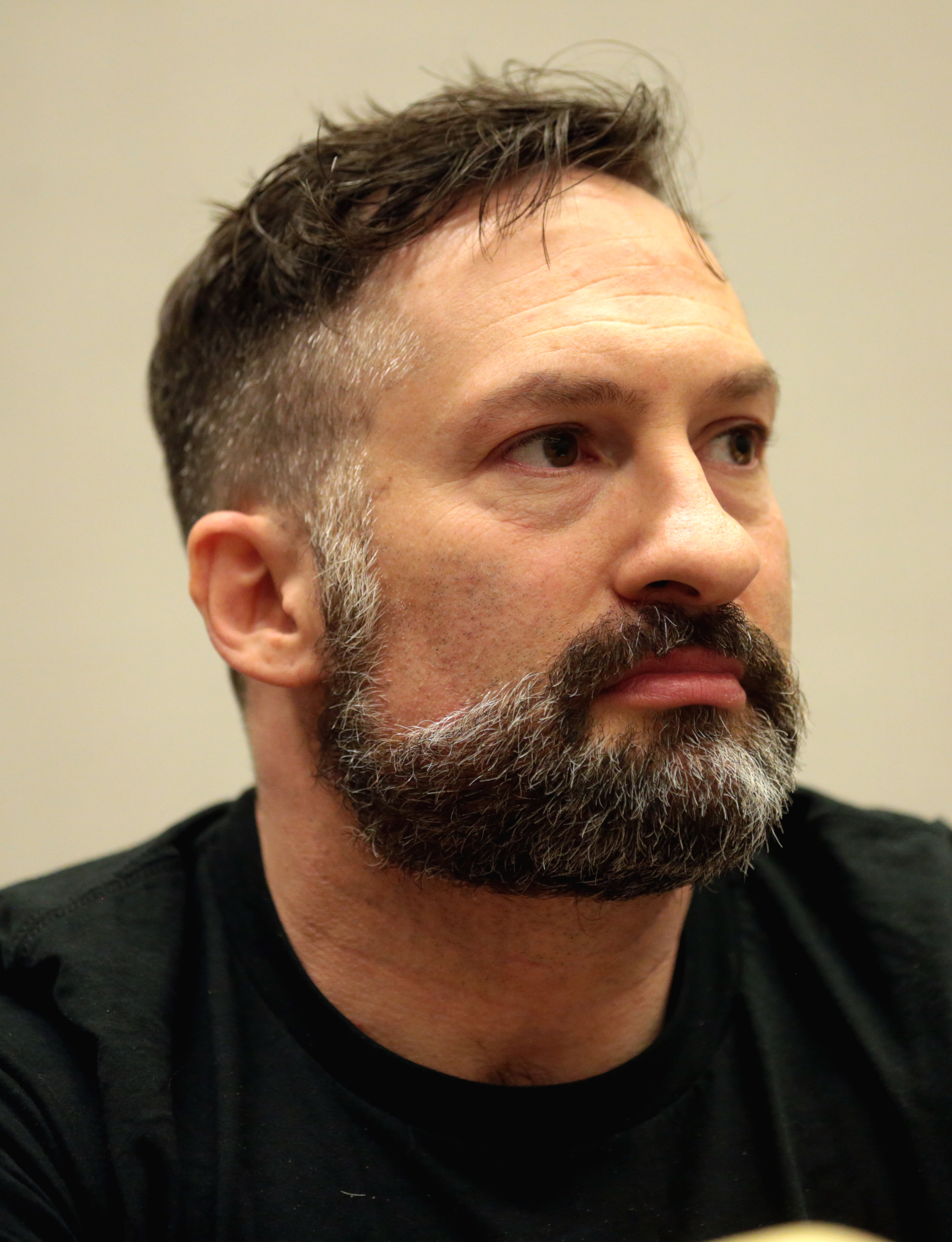
- Cole at the 2017 Phoenix Comicon
- Born: New York City, U.S.
- Occupation: Novelist
- Awards: Compton Crook Award (2013)
- Website: mykecole.com

Myke Cole is an American author of fantasy, science fiction, and non-fiction. His series include the Shadow Ops, Reawakening, and Sacred Throne series. His career also involves television, having appeared on the CBS reality show Hunted and on the Discovery Channel series Contact. His debut novel, Shadow Ops: Control Point won the 2013 Compton Crook Award.

== Early life ==
Cole is of Jewish heritage and grew up outside New York City where his father was a professor at New York City College. Cole completed his undergraduate education at the University of Buffalo where he was a classmate of fellow writer Peter V. Brett. He also holds a master's degree in Museum Studies. He's a former kendo and SCA fighter. His first career was working in IT management for government agencies. Following the attacks on 9/11 he pivoted into a career in intelligence. He first worked as a private contractor before joining the Defense Intelligence Agency in which he served three overseas tours in Iraq. This work earned him the Secretary of Defense Global War on Terrorism Medal and a Joint Service Commendation Medal. Cole subsequently took a position with the Office of Naval Intelligence. Later on, he was commissioned in the US Coast Guard Reserve and served as a Lieutenant in New York City where he worked law enforcement and search-and-rescue boat operations. His work with the Coast Guard included working as a responder to Deepwater Horizon Oil Spill and Hurricane Irene. Cole later worked with the NYPD as part of a defensive cyber unit focused on protecting the department from hackers.

== Career ==
Cole's first professional breakthrough in his writing career came in 2003 when his short story Blood And Horses won third prize in the Writers of the Future contest, with his story published in volume XIX of the anthology. He then published several short stories in magazines and anthologies including Weird Tales, where he went on to be a submission screener. His first publishing deal came in 2012 with his debut novel, Shadow Ops: Control Point published by Ace Books which won the 2013 Compton Crook Award. The series straddles genres incorporating elements of urban fantasy and military fantasy. He has said it took him 15 years of writing nights and weekends to finish it. The next two books in the series were published in as many years before the premiere in 2015 of The Reawakening Trilogy, a prequel set in the same universe as Shadow Ops. Installments of The Reawakening Trilogy were also released annually.

His career grew to include television starting in 2017 when Cole was recruited for the CBS reality show Hunted. The premise of the show was contestants attempting to hide for a month from professional man hunters. Cole was chosen for the show due to his background in military intelligence operations; his role on the show was as one of the investigators tasked with tracking contestants.

In 2018 The Armoured Saint, the first book of The Sacred Throne Trilogy was published by Tor Books. The series is a “grimdark” medieval fantasy, centering around a young girl leading a revolution in a theocratic state. Cole describes the series as being a difficult sell, with the first novel taking him three years to get it accepted by a publisher. 2018 also saw the publishing of Cole's first non-fiction book, Legion Versus Phalanx, a military history book examining the military tactics of the Hellenistic phalanx and the Roman legion. In late 2018, Queen of Crows, the second Sacred Throne trilogy was released.

Also in 2018, a survey on sexual harassment in children's publishing, related to activism around the #MeToo movement, was conducted by author Anne Ursu. Cole was one of several male authors anonymously accused of sexism in the comments of an article that discussed the results. Cole offered a public apology on his own blog, describing his recognition of the negative impact of his behavior. He committed to rectifying his behavior, donated $500 to the Time's Up Legal Defense Fund, and stepped down from managing a writer's happy hour. In response to this, one of his accusers publicly accepted his apology and related that she accused him because of unwanted flirting from him at an industry dinner.

In 2019 Cole returned to TV co-starring on the Discovery Channel series Contact, which explores evidence of UFO activity. While his role on the show involved credulity of the team's discoveries, he maintains that he is a skeptic and the show did not change his opinion about the existence of extraterrestrials.

A vocal critic of the Trump administration, Cole began publishing political commentary articles for various publishers. These include How the Far Right Perverts Ancient History – And Why It Matters, and America's Militarized Police Can't Fight Coronavirus One of these articles titled The Sparta Fetish Is a Cultural Cancer published in The New Republic in 2019 discussed various myths about Sparta and their use by the Republican party, as well as by right-wing political movements and neo-fascist groups in Europe. In the spring of 2020, Cole drew criticism from the Greek media and the Mayor of Sparta in response to the article. His flash science fiction piece, also a political commentary, Congress Must Pass the Living Artists Act appeared in The New York Times in 2020.

Cole's first graphic novel Hundred Wolves was announced in early 2020 with Tony Akins as the artist and Vault Comics as the publisher. It was set in 17th century Ukraine with the story revolving around a mercenary husband/wife couple searching for their kidnapped daughter.

Cole also published his 11th book, Sixteenth Watch with publisher Angry Robot in 2020. Tapping in to his service with the US Coast Guard, the novel is a scifi imagining of a future where the coast guard operates in space.

In the summer of 2020, a comic artist alleged sexual harassment from Cole at a convention afterparty. Cole stated that while he recalled meeting the accuser six years prior at the convention in question, he had no memory of the alleged behavior. Due to public pressure following the allegation, Angry Robot announced they would not move forward with a sequel to Sixteenth Watch, and Vault Comics announced that the Hundred Wolves comic would no longer be released. His agent also announced he would no longer represent Cole as a client following the allegations.

== Bibliography ==
=== Novels ===
==== Shadow Ops trilogy ====
1. Control Point (February 2012)
2. Fortress Frontier (February 2013)
3. Breach Zone (February 2014)
- Weapons in the Earth (2015), Shadow Ops novelette, published in Operation Arcana (ed. by John Joseph Adams)

==== The Reawakening trilogy ====
This is a prequel to the Shadow Ops trilogy.

1. Gemini Cell (January 2015)
2. Javelin Rain (March 2016)
3. Siege Line (October 2017)

==== The Sacred Throne series ====
1. The Armored Saint (February 2018)
2. The Queen of Crows (September 2018)
3. The Killing Light (November 2019)

==== Stand alone novels ====
- Sixteenth Watch (March 2020)

=== Non-fiction ===
1. Legion versus Phalanx: The Epic Struggle for Infantry Supremacy in the Ancient World (October, 2018)
2. The Bronze Lie: Shattering the Myth of Spartan Warrior Supremacy (September, 2021)

=== Short fiction ===
- Shouting Down the Moon (The Best of All Flesh: Zombie Anthology) (reprint) January 2010
- Naktong Flow (Black Gate) Spring 2009
- A Place for Heroes (Weird Tales) January–February 2004
- Blood and Horses (L. Ron Hubbard Presents Writers of the Future Volume XIX) August 2003
- Shouting Down the Moon (The Book of Final Flesh) July 2003
- Car Trouble (Wildsidhe Chronicles) June 2003

=== Non-fiction articles ===
- “Congress Must Pass the Living Artists Act” The New York Times (March, 2020)
- “America's Militarized Police Can't Fight Coronavirus” Foreign Policy (May, 2020)
- “The Sparta Fetish Is a Cultural Cancer” The New Republic (August, 2019)
- “How the Far Right Perverts Ancient History – And Why it Matters” The Daily Beast (March, 2019)
- Centuries Ago, a Man Made a Piece of Armor that Changed the Course of My Life Tor.com (February, 2013)
- How to Violate Your Security Policies: Four Easy Steps on What Not to Do When Guarding Your Security Gates Infosecurity Professional Insights (January 2013)
- Company Commanders: Leaders in and out of Rating U.S. Coast Guard Leadership News (October 2012)
- Ready for the Real Thing U.S. Coast Guard Forum (May 2012)
- Art Imitates War: Post Traumatic Stress Disorder in A Song of Ice and Fire Beyond the Wall: Exploring George R.R. Martin's A Song of Ice and Fire (June 2012)
- A Warrior's Complexity: Orphanage by Robert Buettner Tor.com (January 2012)
- 5 Minutes to Midnight: Warhammer 40,000 and Apocalypse Literature SFSignal (November 2011)
- Why Every Writer Should Join the US Military Johnmiereau.com (July 2011) Reposted at Tor.com (Part II) (January 2012)
- The Kids Are All Right: Greg van Eekhout and Carrie Vaughn on YA and MG Tor.com (June 2011)
- The Analyst's Toolbox Journal of Counterterrorism and Homeland Security International (February 2006)
- The Taxonomic Obsession: Proviling as a 4GW Tactical Error On Point: Counterterrorism Journal (January 2006) Reprinted in Journal of Counterterrorism and Homeland Security International (August 2006)
- Confronting the 4th Generation Enemy Journal of Counterterrorism and Homeland Security International (November 2005)
- Meet the New War, Same as the Old War: Could 5GW Come Full Circle On Point: Counterterrorism Journal (November 2005) Reprinted in Journal of Counterterrorism and Homeland Security International (March 2007)
- Comic Book Warning: An Unlikely Insight into Warfare's 5th Generation Small Wars Journal (October 2005)
- Lessons from the Military: Applying 4GW Theory to the Intelligence Community Defense and The National Interest (August 10, 2005) Reprinted in On Point: Counterterrorism Journal (September 9, 2005)
- Steam Power to the People: China Miéville's Iron Council Strange Horizons (November, 2004)
- Rising Sun vs. Morning Calm: The Birth of a Korean Fencing Tradition Strange Horizons (December, 2002)

== Television ==
- Hunted at IMDb – 2017, 1 season, 7 episodes
- Contact at IMDb – 2019, 1 season, 8 episodes
