= Carrie Goldberg =

American attorney

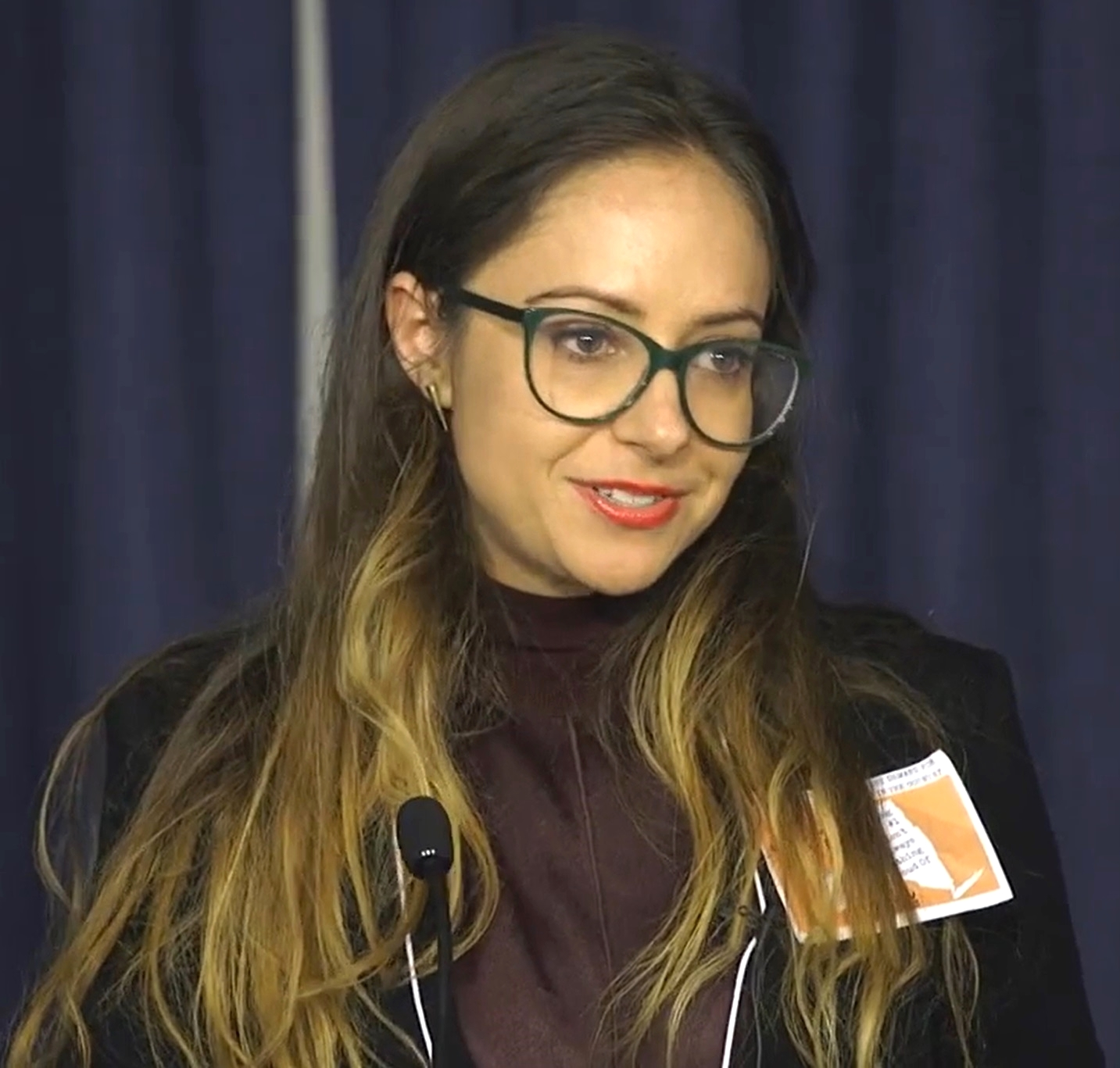
- Goldberg in 2018
- Born: 1976 or 1977 (age 48–49); Aberdeen, Washington, U.S.
- Education: Aberdeen High School
- Alma mater: Vassar College (AB); Brooklyn Law School (JD)
- Occupation: Lawyer
- Organization: C.A. Goldberg PLLC
- Known for: Representing Harvey Weinstein accusers and survivors of sexual violence
- Notable work: Nobody's Victim (2019)
- Spouse: Marc Randazza
- Website: www.cagoldberglaw.com

Carrie Goldberg (born 1976/1977) is an American lawyer specializing in sex crimes with her law firm C.A. Goldberg PLLC. She has represented: five clients who described sexual abuse committed by Harvey Weinstein; the former Democratic Member of Congress Katie Hill after her naked photos were published in the media; and the author Emma Cline after an ex-partner sued for plagiarism. Her legal cases with low-profile individuals—involving revenge porn, intimate partner violence and online abuse—often draw national media attention.

Goldberg is opposed to Section 230 of the U.S. Communications Decency Act (CDA), which exempts websites from being liable for third-party content; her case against Grindr for negligence was rejected for this reason. She has criticized the New York City Department of Education's responses to reports of sexual violence by students, and has represented such students.

Goldberg experienced significant sexual violence, which motivated her to start her law firm in 2014. Prior to this, she worked with Holocaust survivors for several years and in property and guardianship law. Her legal career and life experiences are the subject of her book Nobody's Victim (2019), which also describes other famous cases of sexual violence by "psychos, stalkers, pervs, and trolls".

== Early life and education ==
Goldberg grew up in Aberdeen, Washington, as the second-oldest of four siblings. She graduated from Aberdeen High School in 1995. Her father owned a furniture store and was involved in reopening a local paper mill; her mother wrote obituaries for the local paper before she had children. Goldberg's grandmother, born in the 1910s, was a professor of dental hygiene. Goldberg's wardrobe incorporates much of her grandmother's old clothing.

As a young girl, Goldberg started a business initiative—Masked Mams—where she would barter riot grrrl-esque bras made from doll heads at the Evergreen State College. When working on her high school yearbook with a friend, she got in trouble for writing erotica about the boys' sports teams. A formative moment in her childhood was when she dropped a friend off at a motel party and the friend was raped while unconscious and intoxicated.

Prior to college, Goldberg wanted to be a writer. She studied at Vassar College, where she started a relationship with a professor whom she later married and divorced. Working at her father's mill one summer, Goldberg faced routine workplace sexual harassment, which led her to develop an eating disorder that hospitalized her; she suspended from Vassar for a semester. She graduated with an A.B. degree in 1999, majoring in English.

== Career ==
Goldberg's work against revenge porn is best known but her career as an attorney is broader, including cases of "sextortion" (sexual extortion), online harassment, cyberstalking, intimate partner violence, and rape. Her clients include minors. Goldberg told Psychology Today that the one commonality in her clients is that "someone took away their control", whether it was their control over their body, privacy or reputation. She told The Cut in 2019 that she does not maintain a "traditional attorney-client relationship", as the sensitive nature of cases requires mutual trust. Her law firm has staff members who were formerly her clients; one such person is Norma Buster, a client relations manager whose ex-boyfriend posted revenge porn of her.

Goldberg focuses on civil law, but her law firm also works on some criminal cases, restraining orders and removing abuse content from the internet. Goldberg advises people who have experienced revenge porn and online abuse to keep evidence of the crimes rather than deleting it. She says that they should first report the abuse to the websites hosting the content, then contact police or Title IX co-ordinators (in educational settings), and find legal assistance if this fails. An attorney may assist in sending cease and desist letters, Digital Millennium Copyright Act (DMCA) takedown notices, and search engine de-indexing requests.

=== Early career ===
After moving to New York in 1999, Goldberg was a case manager for Holocaust survivors; she began law school at night school in 2003. In 2007, she graduated from her night school, Brooklyn Law School, with a J.D. degree. As a lawyer, she advocated for tenants facing eviction, then moved on to guardianship law. As Director of Legal Services with the Vera Institute of Justice, Goldberg negotiated clients' wishes for end-of-life care and represented elderly people who were being taken advantage of.

In interviews, Goldberg has said that her motivation to start a law firm—C.A. Goldberg PLLC—arose from her harassment by a former partner, who she nicknamed her "psycho ex". In the final chapter of Nobody's Victim, she gave more full detail. Within the space of a few months in 2012, she was: spiked, violently raped and assaulted by a doctor; sexually assaulted by a masseur; and date raped. Soon after, in 2013, she met her "psycho ex"; after they broke up, his harassment of her included abusive messages, attempted breaking and entering, frivolous litigation, sending sexual images to judges and work colleagues, and contacting her family and ex-boyfriends with vivid descriptions of her being raped by the doctor.

While standing on a cliff over Galway Bay, Ireland, Goldberg contemplated suicide, but decided she would try to change her life around within a year. She had not found an attorney who understood the law as it related to domestic violence, copyright and the internet, so Goldberg aimed to become one. She had $3,000 when she started her law firm in 2014, from accrued holiday time at her previous job. She rented a small Brooklyn office, made a website and paid for phone and internet bills on a shoestring budget.

=== High-profile cases ===
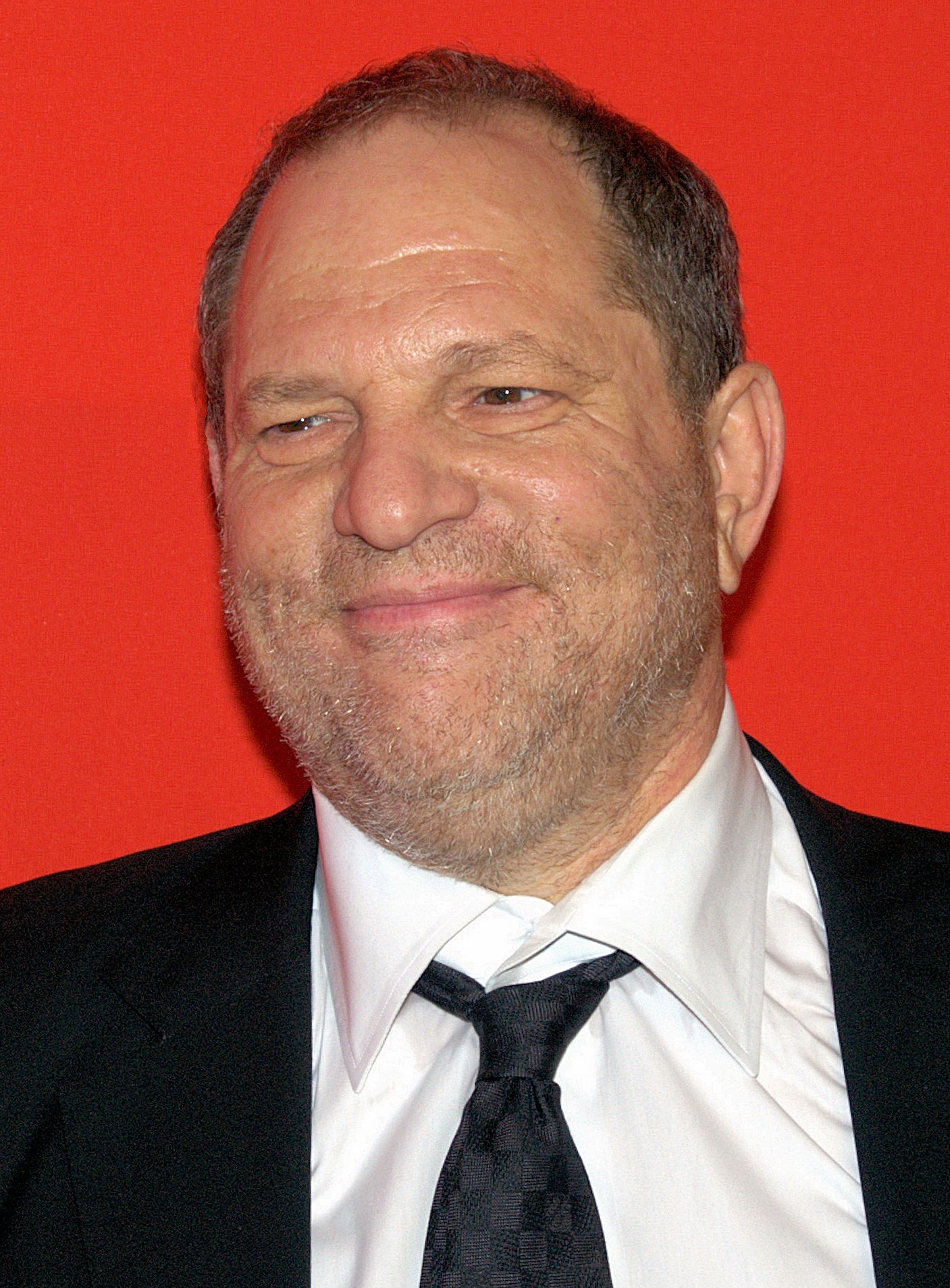
Goldberg represented a number of clients who spoke about sexual violence committed by film producer Harvey Weinstein.

Goldberg worked for five clients who alleged sexual abuse by Harvey Weinstein, a film producer. In particular, Goldberg represented Lucia Evans, whose evidence contributed to the New York County District Attorney deciding to pursue charges against Weinstein. Goldberg was sharply critical of the district attorney dropping Evans' charges. Weinstein would eventually be accused of sexual violence in over 100 instances, and be sentenced in 2020 to 23 years in prison. The public stories of abuse committed by Weinstein led to the "Weinstein effect", wherein people revealed stories of sexual violence by famous figures, and the wider #MeToo movement. Goldberg worked as a lawyer for the Weinstein accuser Asia Argento when she was herself accused of sexual violence against an underage boy; Argento settled for $380,000.

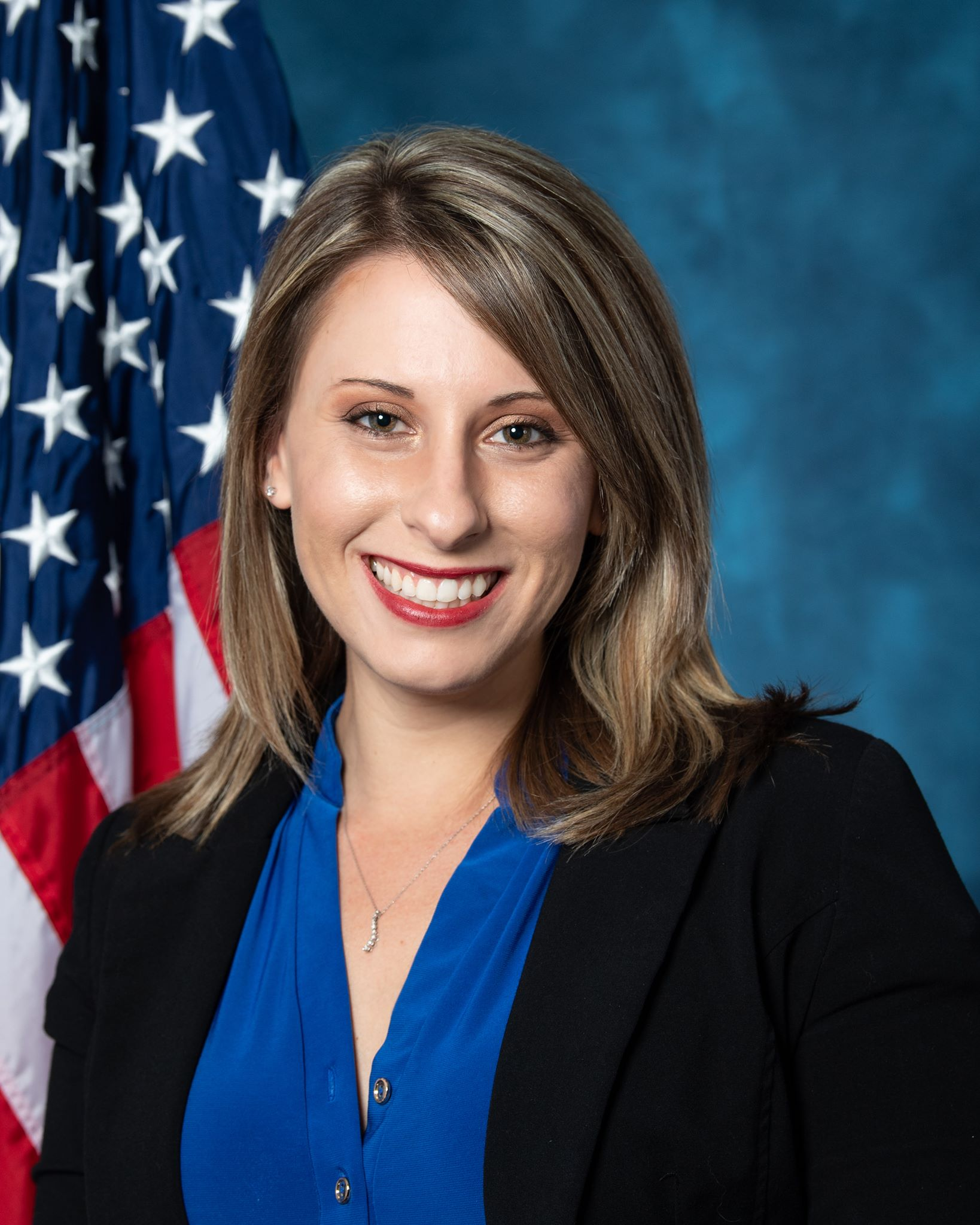
Politician Katie Hill unsuccessfully sued the Daily Mail and RedState for publishing naked photos of her, with Goldberg as her lawyer.

After the Democratic Member of Congress Katie Hill's naked photos were published by the Daily Mail—a British tabloid—and RedState—a conservative blog—Goldberg represented her. Hill filed a lawsuit against the publications, the journalist who sourced the images, and her ex-husband—who she accused of leaking them. The images related to an inappropriate relationship with a campaign staffer, drug usage, and a tattoo resembling a white supremacist symbol. Goldberg argued that they were gratuitous and unnecessary, because the information content could have been conveyed through text and other images. The judge dismissed the case early in the process under anti-SLAPP legislation, and Hill was ordered to pay her defendant's fees.

Goldberg worked for the author Emma Cline, who was sued by her ex-boyfriend Chaz Reetz-Laiolo for plagiarism. Cline counter-sued for physical and emotional abuse by Reetz-Laiolo during their relationship, and Reetz-Laiolo's lawyers responded with a letter including detailed claims about Cline's alleged sexual history, including naked images of Cline. Goldberg saw this action as "inappropriate and ludicrous" as it gave her client a choice between settling the lawsuit or allowing the claims and sexual images to be publicly released. The plagiarism case was later dismissed.

Goldberg represented Matthew Herrick in an unsuccessful lawsuit against Grindr, a dating app for men who have sex with men. Herrick's ex, Oscar Juan Carlos Gutierrez, impersonated Herrick on Grindr, giving his location and saying he wanted violent rape fantasy sex, sometimes claiming to be HIV-positive and addicted to crystal meth. Though other dating apps banned Gutierrez from their platforms, Grindr did not. Over 1,000 men were lured to Herrick's home in the year before Gutierrez was arrested. Goldberg and Herrick sued Grindr for negligence, but a judge found that they were not liable due to Section 230 of the Communications Decency Act (CDA). A Second Circuit appeal was also declined.

Alongside Maggie McLetchie, Goldberg represented one client after her ex-husband—a United States Marshals Service official—and his second wife framed her for harassing and stalking the wife and soliciting men to rape her. Coverage of the ex-husband's claims against Goldberg's client made Dateline NBC, The Washington Post, People and The Daily Beast and led to her wrongful imprisonment for 88 days. She was exonerated in 2017, and the marshal's second wife was imprisoned. In 2021, the woman received a settlement from the city of Anaheim, California, and the marshal was arrested.

=== Nobody's Victim ===
Goldberg's book "Nobody's Victim: Fighting Psychos, Stalkers, Pervs, and Trolls" was published by Plume in August 2019. It describes a number of her cases, including that of Herrick vs. Grindr and the Weinstein accusers, as well as a man who impersonated his girlfriend's ex-partners to harass her, women coerced into pornography under false pretenses, and children who were raped or sexually extorted by adults over the internet. Goldberg also describes her personal experiences with sexual violence, including the motivation for her to start a law firm, and other famous cases.

=== Political advocacy ===
Goldberg has been involved in creating anti-revenge porn legislation across many states. For instance, she worked on a New York bill criminalizing revenge porn that passed in 2019; it outlawed distribution of sexual images and videos without the consent of the person pictured, and with intent to harm that person. A federal law that Goldberg supported called the Ending Nonconsensual Online User Graphic Harassment (ENOUGH) Act failed to pass.

Goldberg is affiliated with a number of non-profits and working groups related to domestic violence and sexual violence. She is a board member of the Cyber Civil Rights Initiative. In 2016, she was invited to a White House meeting about sexual assault in schools. Her writing has been published in The Washington Post and Elle.

=== Television ===
Goldberg was a series consultant on the American drama series 13 Reasons Why (2017–2020), set in a high school where a student dies by suicide. She appeared on a panel in the behind-the-scenes special, Beyond the Reasons, for season two. In 2017, Variety reported that CBS Studios and Sony Pictures Television had put work into a planned television series based on Goldberg's life and career.

== Views ==
In 2019, Goldberg told Ms. that technology is not "inherently harmful" but its anonymity "amplifies and perpetuates the harm instigated by abusers". She criticized law enforcement for failures to investigate or appreciate the seriousness of crimes with online elements. In an interview with The Guardian, Goldberg commented also on law schools, saying that they are not educating students properly without incorporating internet law into every course, rather than teaching it as a separate subject.

Goldberg opposes Section 230 of the U.S. Communications Decency Act (CDA)—which exempts websites from being liable for third-party content. According to Goldberg, the law has broadened since its introduction in the 1990s, and the internet has dramatically increased in scope. She said that it was "a shamefully archaic law that drastically needs a rethink", as websites can "allow abuse to flourish" without consequence. She argued that the law gives no incentive for internet companies to "build basic safety features". Goldberg's firm campaigns for reform to Section 230; Goldberg told MIT Technology Review that she would like to see it "eradicated". She testified to this effect in a 2021 congressional hearing.

Goldberg has accused the Electronic Frontier Foundation of being lobbyists for Big Tech and of protecting the online activities of harassers, stalkers and abusers. The EFF in turn have called her description of Section 230 an "oversimplification" and described one of Goldberg's lawsuits as "dangerous" to free speech.

She has criticised the New York City Department of Education for failing to protect and provide care for female African-American students who were sexually assaulted at school.

== Personal life ==
Goldberg enjoys running and visiting museums. She is married to First Amendment lawyer, Marc Randazza.
