= Charles DeBarber =

American cybersecurity professional

- Born: Ashtabula, Ohio
- Occupation: Cyber intelligence Analyst/Victim Advocate
- Years active: 2004–present
- Known for: Hunted
- Website: Official Twitter

Charles "Fox" DeBarber is an American cyber threat intelligence and tech victim advocate, best known for his role as a cyber intelligence analyst on the CBS television series Hunted. He is a former United States Army analyst and is the Chief of Intelligence at the non-profit the National Center for Victims of Internet and Cyber Exploitation (NCVIC).

== Education ==
DeBarber completed his MA in Intelligence Operations from American Military University in 2011 and graduated from the Defense Language Institute where he studied Modern Standard Arabic.

== Career ==
DeBarber served in the US Army as a 35N (Signals Intelligence Collector/Analyst) from 2004 to 2013. During that time he completed one deployment during the surge of Operation Iraqi Freedom. He was awarded an Army Achievement Medal for his part in the recovery of the remains of a DUSTWUN soldier in 2008. During his service, he was awarded two Army Achievement Medals, an Army Commendation Medal, Military Outstanding Volunteer Service Medal, Iraqi Campaign Medal, and two Meritorious Unit Commendations.

Since leaving the military, DeBarber has worked as a Certified Ethical Hacker, cyber intelligence analyst, and digital forensics investigator. He began working with survivors of non-consensual intimate imagery (NCII) in 2015.

In 2016, he was chosen as a Cyber Analyst and lead Digital Forensics Examiner on CBS's reality television show Hunted. He was featured in the episode "Operation Cupid's Revenge".

Mr. DeBarber testified in the 2019 civil trial against the defunct GirlsDoPorn sex trafficking ring.

He appeared before the Canadian House of Commons on June 7, 2021, and criticized PornHub's role in failing to impede the spread of NCSAM for over a decade.

In July 2022, Charles DeBarber led a team in Barcelona, Spain to help find GirlsDoPorn trafficking ringleader Michael Pratt. The discovery Pratt was part of the 2020 Ledger Cryptocurrency wallet Leak led the team to Barcelona. The team found the fake Swiss ID that led to Pratt's capture later that year after he appeared on the FBI's Most Wanted List.

== Non-profit work ==
Since 2015, DeBarber has sat on the advisory board for the anti-child sex trafficking NGO Child Rescue and has assisted similar NGOs in efforts to recover lost children and combat child exploitation.
