= Hunted (2017 TV series) =

American reality TV series based on the British TV series of the same name

- Also known as: Hunted USA
- Genre: Action; Reality competition
- Based on: Hunted UK
- Country of origin: United States
- Original language: English
- No. of seasons: 1
- No. of episodes: 7

Production
- Production company: Endemol Shine North America

Original release
- Network: CBS
- Release: January 22 – March 1, 2017

Hunted is an American reality TV series based on the British TV series of the same name. It ran on CBS from January 22 to March 1, 2017.

== Premise ==
The show is a competition series that centers on nine teams of two as they are fugitives on the run from highly skilled investigators. Each pair attempts to use their wits to evade capture for 28 days in a 100,000-square-mile region in the southeastern United States in order to win the grand prize of $250,000.

== Premiere ==
Hunted premiered on January 22, 2017, on CBS after the 2017 AFC Championship Game.

== Contestants ==
Fugitive Team	Relationship	First Episode	Last Episode	Result	Days Lasted
English King & Stephen King	Married	4: "Fight, Flight or Freeze"	7: "The Final Escape"	Eluded Capture Won $250,000	28
Lee Wilson & Hilmar Skagfield	Friends	2: "Snitches Get Stitches"	7: "The Final Escape"	Eluded Capture Won $250,000	28
Aarif Mirza & Immad Ahmed	Friends	2: "Snitches Get Stitches"	7: "The Final Escape"	Captured by Team India (assisted by Team Golf) in Atlanta, GA	22
Troy Pfost & Chele Pfost	Married	2: "Snitches Get Stitches"		Captured by Team Bravo in Dade City, FL	18
David Windecher & Emiley Cox	Dating	1: "The Internet Never Forgets"	6: "Poking the Bear"	Captured by Team Alpha (assisted by Team Charlie) in Oxford, AL	16
Miles Svoboda & Will Muzika	Friends	3: "Operation Cupid's Revenge"		Captured by Team Hotel (assisted by Team Echo) in Beaufort, SC	16
Sentra Tran & Thu Tran	Friends	3: "Operation Cupid's Revenge"	4: "Fight, Flight or Freeze"	Captured by Team Delta in Lake City, FL	14
Angela Brinson & Michele Domenick	Childhood friends	1: "The Internet Never Forgets"	2: "Snitches Get Stitches"	Captured by Team Echo in Augusta, GA	10
Matt Sundberg & Christina Zapolski	Engaged	1: "The Internet Never Forgets"		Captured by Team Foxtrot (assisted by Team Golf) in Atlanta, GA	1

== Investigators ==
=== Command Center ===
Robert W. Clark
Commander, FBI (Ret.)

Intelligence

Theresa Payton
Head of Intelligence, Former White House CIO
Ben Owen
Senior Analyst, MI5 (Former) & Hunter on Hunted UK

Intelligence Analysts
Steve Masterson
Intelligence Analyst, Naval Intelligence (Former)
Connie Min
Intelligence Analyst, CIA (Former)
Aki Peritz
Intelligence Analyst, CIA (Former)
Zaira Pirzada
Intelligence Analyst, Academia

Cyber Analysts
Myke Cole
Cyber Analyst, USCG
Charles DeBarber
Cyber Analyst, US Army Cyber Intelligence (Former)
Landon Stewart
Cyber Analyst, US Army/NSA (Former)
Dr. Max Wachtel
Forensic Psychologist, Behavioral Profiler

=== Operations ===
Lenny DePaul
Head of Operations, US Marshals (Ret.)
Ryan 'Ry Phi' Phillips
Operations Supervisor, SWAT
Andrew Stumpf
Operations Supervisor, Navy SEAL (Ret.)

Hunters

Team Alpha
John "Buck" Smith
US Marshals (Ret.)
Walter "Griff" Garrison
Detective (Ret.)

Team Bravo
Jermaine Finks
Department of Homeland Security
Chad Light
US Army Special Forces (Former)

Team Charlie
Evy Poumpouras
US Secret Service
Maureen O'Connell
FBI (Ret.)

Team Delta
Jacquie Bainer
Private Investigator
Paul Rossi
USN (Former)

Team Echo
Allison "Alli" Paganetti
US Army
Jonathan Gomez
US Army Rangers

Team Foxtrot
Muhammad 'Shadow' Bilal
US Army Special Forces (Ret.)
Cortice Miles
Detective

Team Golf
John Picciano
Detective
Vinny Senzamici
US Marshals (Former)

Team Hotel
Nick "Klem" Klementowicz
SWAT
Sam Phillips
SWAT

Team India
Amanda Fry
El Paso Police Department
Roxanne Lopez
Detective

== Episodes ==
No.	Title	Original release date	US viewers (millions)
1	"The Internet Never Forgets"	January 22, 2017	11.85
Angela & Michele began running in Douglasville, Georgia and Stone Mountain, Georgia. They traveled to a campground. David & Emiley began running in Atlanta, Georgia. They immediately withdrew $100 at an ATM then traveled to a friend's house. Content of a page removed from Emiley's desk planner was recovered by the hunters when they shaded the next page using a pencil. Matt & Christina began running in Mount Pleasant, South Carolina. They withdrew $100 at an ATM near a bus station at which they proceeded to buy tickets and board a bus. Using this information, the investigators sent hunters to the bus' destination in Atlanta, where Team Foxtrot (assisted by Team Golf) captured them near the bus station after 1 day on the run. Eliminated: Matt & Christina
2	"Snitches Get Stitches"	January 25, 2017	5.48
Angela & Michele were captured after 10 days on the run by Team Echo in Augusta as they were leaving a friend's business after Angela's daughter revealed their location of their friend. Aarif & Immad began running in Marietta, Georgia and traveled to a farm. Lee & Hilmar began running in Atlanta, Georgia and traveled to a friend's house. Troy & Chele began running in New Port Richey, Florida. They went camping in a forest, but were captured after 18 days on the run by Team Bravo in Dade City, Florida, near their friend's property. Eliminated: Angela & Michele; Troy & Chele
3	"Operation Cupid's Revenge"	February 1, 2017	5.39
Lee's wife told Lee & Hilmar about her unknowingly butt-dialing the hunters who had then called her back and told her some of what they'd heard during the call. Miles & Will began running in Atlanta, Georgia. A "Have You Seen Me?" campaign by the investigators on social media produced a tip (by the sister of the woman currently helping them) which led to the investigators tracking the movements of the tipster's sister's phone as she was driving the fugitives to South Carolina. A flying drone found them on a boat. They were captured after 15 days on the run by Team Hotel (assisted by Team Echo) in Beaufort, South Carolina. Sentra & Thu began running in Woodstock, Georgia. They immediately withdrew $100 at an ATM and bought a burner phone. The investigators were able to determine the purchase location and time, with which they were able to get the receipt with the phone number. The investigators began tracking the phone's movements. Eliminated: Miles & Will
4	"Fight, Flight or Freeze"	February 8, 2017	5.37
English & Stephen began their run. Sentra & Thu were captured after 14 days on the run by Team Delta in Lake City, Florida. Eliminated: Sentra & Thu
5	"A $250,000 Gamble"	February 15, 2017	5.26
Eliminated: None
6	"Poking the Bear"	February 22, 2017	5.07
David & Emiley were captured after 16 days on the run by Team Alpha (assisted by Team Charlie) in Oxford, Alabama. Eliminated: David & Emily
7	"The Final Escape"	March 1, 2017	4.79
Aarif & Immad were captured after 22 days on the run by Team India (assisted by Team Golf) in Atlanta, Georgia. After 28 days on the run, English & Stephen made it to the extraction point at Lake Blue Ridge Marina in Blue Ridge, Georgia. After 28 days on the run, Lee & Hilmar made it to their extraction point at Blairsville Municipal Airport in Blairsville, Georgia. Eliminated: Aarif & Immad; Winners: English & Stephen; Lee & Hilmar

== Production ==
The show was filmed without the assistance of government or law enforcement. Each episode ends with a disclaimer stating that 'while the investigative techniques shown are real, some procedures have been replicated for broadcast.'

Some information the hunters obtained — such as the Enterprise rental agreement and the car's location — came from the production itself, provided to the hunters when they requested it. Also, participants granted access in advance to their personal records, homes and phones, and then that information was meted out to the hunters the same way it would have been during an actual investigation.

There was a clear firewall between the hunter team and fugitive team. The production team did considerable research to ensure that the requests and receipt of information simulated what would happen in the real world, such as waiting for a subpoena. Additionally, the hunters had to make proper requests, and were sometimes denied information by the production team.

Hunted was picked up by Channel 4 in the UK, but renamed Hunted USA to avoid confusion with the UK version.
