= Porn Wikileaks =

Database privacy breach

Porn Wikileaks was a wiki website which contained the personal information, including the real names, of over 15,000 pornographic actors. The information came from a patient database managed by AIM Medical Associates which has closed due to the lawsuits caused by the leaks, a clinic where many pornographic film performers were tested for sexually transmitted diseases. Adult performer Christian XXX stated, "They posted my real name, the real names of my parents and pictures of them, their home address and telephone number, the name and picture and phone number of my brother, a picture of the cemetery where my grandfather recently passed away, not to mention saying that I have HIV."

== Ownership ==
The website received criticism from performers such as Kimberly Kane who stated, "Most of us in the porn industry know who is behind Porn WikiLeaks; he is doing it out of hatred for a business that shunned him for being even too repugnant for porn." The man referred to stated that he has no connections to the site "other than having an account there". This was supported in the trial against GirlsDoPorn, where the witness Monica's story was important to the case because the photos she had shared only with the men behind GirlsDoPorn.com, and then deleted, made their way onto PornWikiLeaks, establishing a connection beyond domain registrants between the two sites.

== Ending ==
In August 2019, Porn Wikileaks was purchased by Bang Bros, who shut it down; Bang Bros subsequently posted a video of a pile of hard drives being set on fire.
