= Wallace Wilson Graham =

American politician (1815–1898)

Wallace Wilson Graham (September 16, 1815 - October 13, 1898) was an American politician and lawyer.

Born in Crageycroy, County Armagh, Ireland, Graham moved with family to Quebec and then to Ashtabula, Ohio. There, he grew up and was admitted to the Ohio bar in 1837. In 1838, he moved to Milwaukee, Wisconsin Territory and practiced law. He served in the Milwaukee County, Wisconsin Board of Supervisors and the Milwaukee County Council. He served in the first Wisconsin Constitutional Convention of 1846 as a Democrat. Graham then served in the Wisconsin State Assembly in 1852. He died in Milwaukee, Wisconsin.
