= List of German Americans =

German Americans (German: Deutschamerikaner) are citizens of the United States who are of German ancestry. They form the largest ethnic ancestry group in the United States, accounting for 17% of U.S. population.

The first significant numbers arrived in the 1680s in New York and Pennsylvania. Some eight million German immigrants have entered the United States since then. Immigration continued in substantial numbers during the 19th century; the largest number of arrivals came from 1840 to 1900, when Germans formed the largest group of immigrants coming to the U.S., outnumbering the Irish and English. Some arrived seeking religious or political freedom (see Forty-eighters), others for economic opportunities greater than those in Europe, and others for the chance to start afresh in the New World. California and Pennsylvania have the largest populations of German origin, with more than six million German Americans residing in the two states alone. More than 50 million people in the United States identify German as their ancestry; it is often mixed with other Northern European ethnicities. This list also includes people of German Jewish descent.

Americans of German descent live in nearly every American county, from the East Coast, where the first German settlers arrived in the 17th century, to the West Coast and in all the states in between. German Americans and those Germans who settled in the U.S. have been influential in almost every field, from science, to architecture, to entertainment, and to commercial industry.

== Art and literature ==
=== Architects ===
- Dankmar Adler – architect
- Adolf Cluss – architect, builder of numerous public buildings in Washington, D.C.
- Frederick P. Dinkelberg – architect, co-designer of the Flatiron Building
- Ferdinand Gottlieb – architect heading his own firm, Ferdinand Gottlieb & Associates, based in Dobbs Ferry, New York
- Walter Gropius – pioneer in modern architecture, founder of Bauhaus
- Albert Kahn – industrial architect; known as the "architect of Detroit"
- Richard Kiehnel – senior partner of Kiehnel, Elliot and Chalfant
- Henry C. Koch – architect based in Milwaukee, Wisconsin
- William F. Lamb – architect, principal designer of the Empire State Building; co-founder of Shreve, Lamb & Harmon
- Ludwig Mies van der Rohe – architect, academic, and interior designer
- Joseph Molitor – Chicago-based church architect
- John A. Roebling – architect, known for designing the Brooklyn Bridge
- Washington Roebling – civil engineer known for his work on the Brooklyn Bridge, which was designed by his father John A. Roebling
- Frederick C. Sauer – architect, particularly in the Pittsburgh, Pennsylvania, region of the late 19th and early 20th centuries
- Frederick G. Scheibler Jr. – Art Nouveau Pittsburgh architect
- August Schoenborn – helped design the United States Capitol Dome
- Hans Schuler – sculptor and monument maker; first American sculptor to win the Salon Gold Medal
- Louis Skidmore – architect, co-founder of Skidmore, Owings & Merrill
- Adolph Strauch – landscape architect
- Horace Trumbauer – prominent architect of the Gilded Age, known for designing residential manors for the wealthy
- Ludwig Mies van der Rohe – pioneer of modern architecture, second Chicago School of Architecture
- Thomas Ustick Walter – fourth Architect of the Capitol, designed the current United States Capitol dome
- Henry B. Winter – Manhattan, Kansas-based architect

=== Artists ===
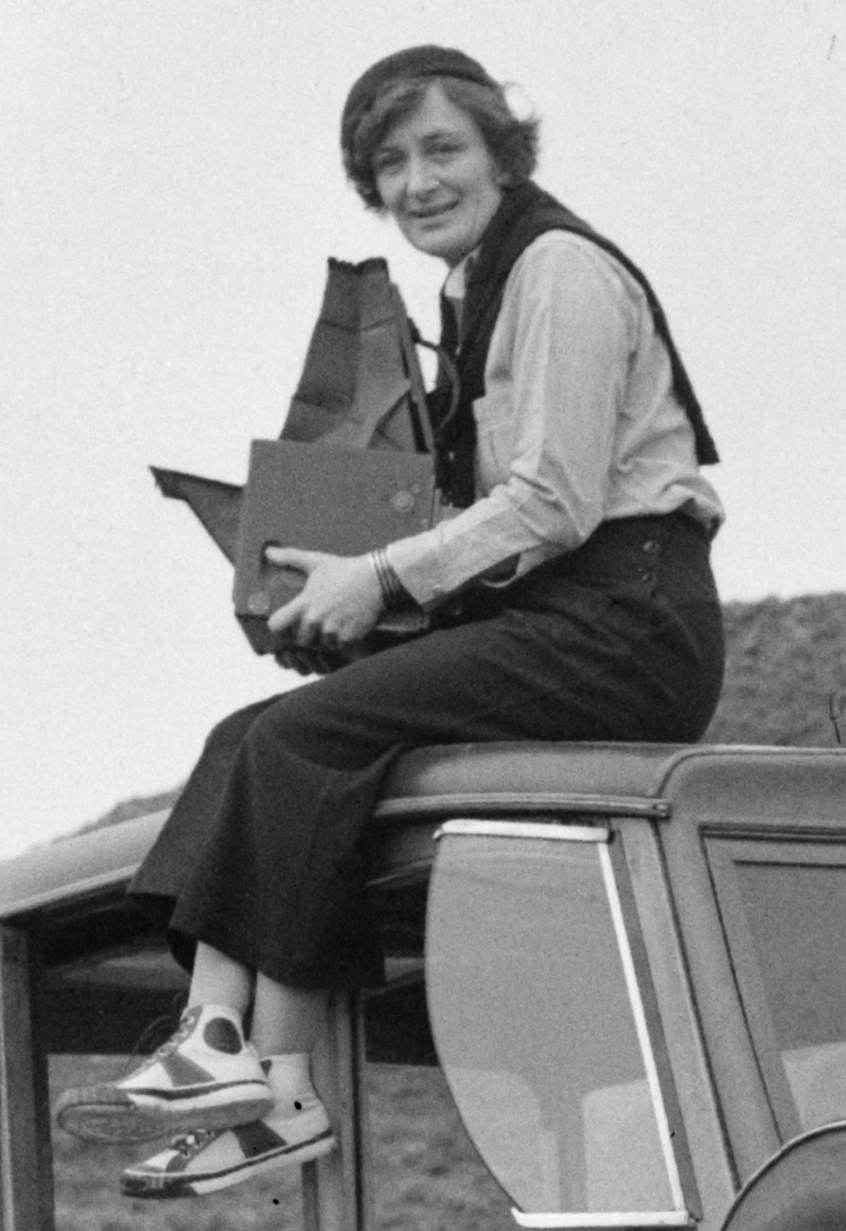
Dorothea Lange

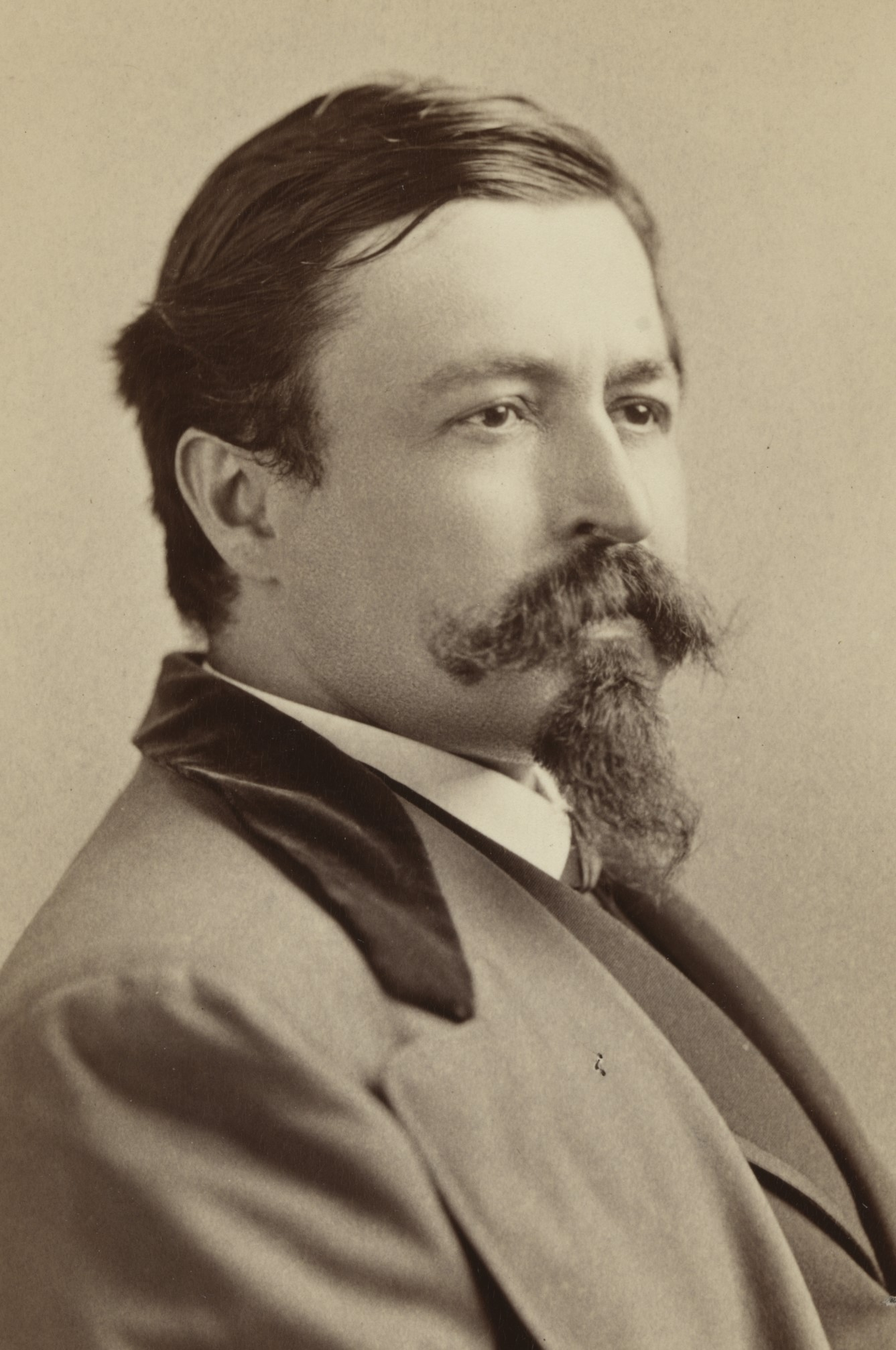
Thomas Nast

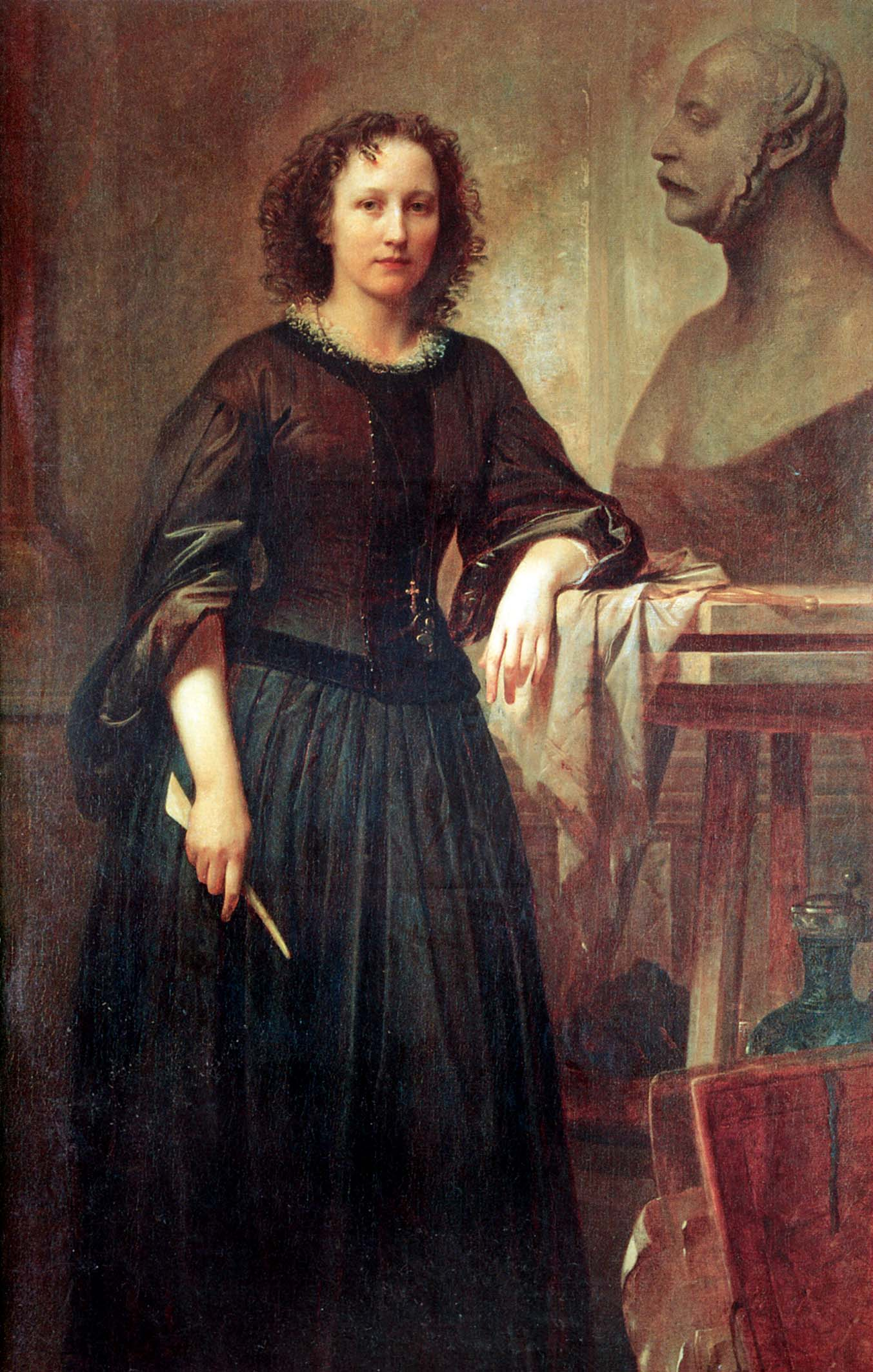
Elisabet Ney

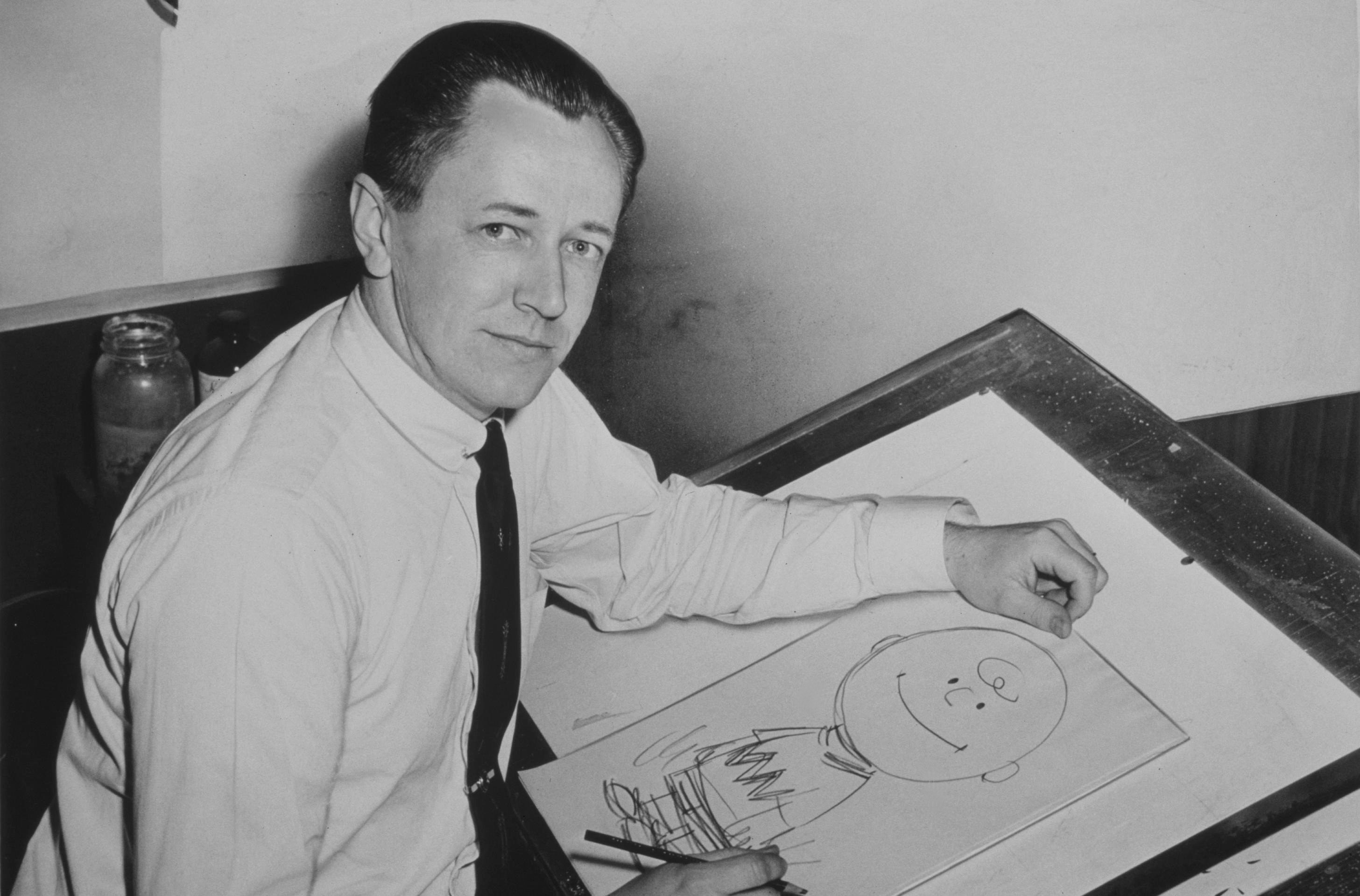
Charles Schulz

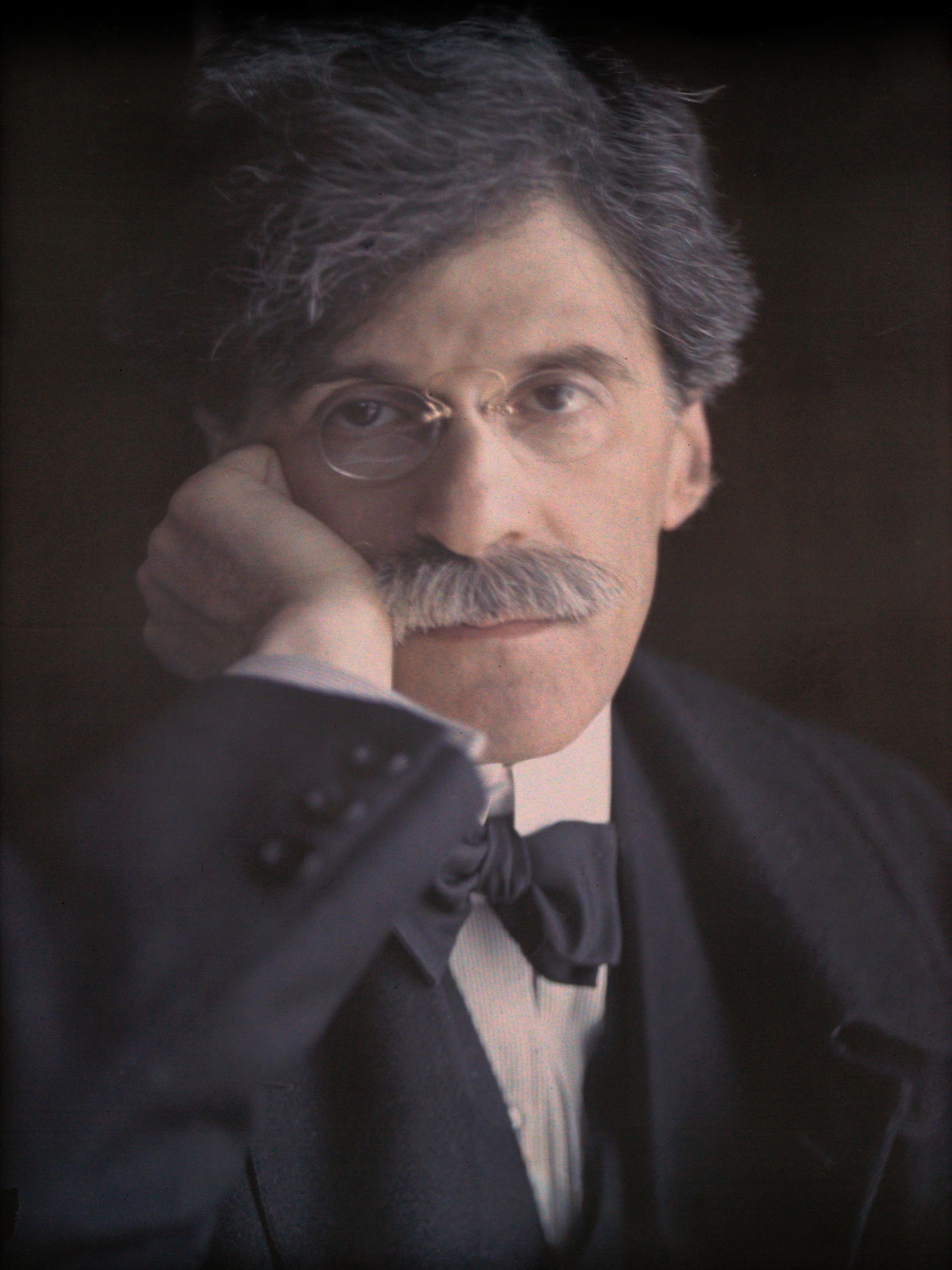
Alfred Stieglitz

- Anni Albers – printmaker, textile artist
- Josef Albers – painter and graphic artist
- Leonard Bahr – portrait painter, muralist, illustrator and educator. He worked for many years as a painting professor at the Maryland Institute College of Art (MICA)
- Earl W. Bascom – painter, printmaker, and sculptor ("Cowboy of Cowboy Artists")
- Robert Benecke – early photographer
- Albert Bierstadt – painter, known for his large landscapes of the American West
- Richard Bock – sculptor and associate of Frank Lloyd Wright
- Ida Bothe – artist and educator
- Charles Dellschau – one of America's earliest known outsider artists, draftsman engineer, creating drawings, collages and watercolors of airplanes and airships
- Rudolph Dirks – comic strip artist who created The Katzenjammer Kids
- Alfred Eisenstaedt – photographer and photojournalist best remembered for his photograph capturing the celebration of V-J Day
- Jimmy Ernst – painter
- Carl Eytel – artist of desert landscapes living in early 20th-century Palm Springs, California
- Claire Falkenstein – sculptor, painter, print-maker and jewelry designer known for her large-scale abstract metal and glass sculptures
- Andreas Feininger – photographer and writer on photographic technique
- Lyonel Feininger – painter and caricaturist
- Carl Giers – early photographer
- George Grosz – member of the Berlin Dada and New Objectivity group, known especially for his savagely caricatural drawings of Berlin life in the 1920s
- Don Heck – comics artist best known for co-creating the Marvel Comics characters Iron Man and the Wasp, and for his long run penciling the Marvel superhero-team series The Avengers during the 1960s Silver Age of comic books
- Uli Herzner – fashion designer
- Hans Hofmann – abstract expressionist painter
- Ub Iwerks – Academy Award-winning animator, cartoonist and special effects technician, famous for his work for Walt Disney
- Klaus Janson – comic book artist (inker), working regularly for Marvel Comics and DC Comics and sporadically for independent companies
- Milt Kahl – animator, one of the "Nine Old Men" at Walt Disney Productions
- Ulli Kampelmann – painter and filmmaker
- Kenya (Robinson) – multimedia artist
- Harold Knerr – illustrator of The Katzenjammer Kids until 1949
- Fritz Kredel – woodcut artist and illustrator known for fairy tale and young readers' fiction drawings, delicate and hand-colored botanical woodcuts, and US and European armies' uniforms over time
- John Lewis Krimmel – America's first genre painter
- Dorothea Lange – documentary photographer and photojournalist
- Emanuel Leutze – history painter best known for his painting Washington Crossing the Delaware
- Cornelius Krieghoff – painter
- Nicola Marschall – artist, designed the first Confederate flag and the Confederate uniform
- Louis Maurer – lithographer
- David Muench – landscape and nature photographer known for portraying the American western landscape
- Marc Muench – sports and landscape photographer
- Charles Christian Nahl – painter who is called California's first significant artist
- Thomas Nast – political cartoonist
- Elisabet Ney – sculptor
- Erwin Panofsky – art historian
- Suzanne Pastor – photographer
- Wolfgang Reitherman – animator, director and producer, one of the "Nine Old Men" at Walt Disney Productions
- William Henry Rinehart – Neoclassical sculptor
- Julian Ritter – Classical Realist painter best known for his paintings of nudes, clowns and portraits and his ill-fated voyage of the South Pacific
- Severin Roesen – still life painter
- Paulus Roetter – landscape and botanical painter
- Christoph Sauer – earliest type founder in America, published the first German Bible (1743) and the first religious magazine (1764) in America
- Charles M. Schulz – cartoonist, creator of the comic strip Peanuts
- Christian Siriano – fashion designer
- Gustavus Sohon – artist
- Henry William Stiegel – glassmaker and ironmaster
- Alfred Stieglitz – photographer instrumental in making photography an acceptable art form alongside painting and sculpture
- Ruth VanSickle Ford – painter, art teacher, and owner of the Chicago Academy of Fine Arts
- Richard Veenfliet – artist known for illustration-figure, genre and landscape
- Patrizia von Brandenstein – production designer
- Kat Von D (Katherine von Drachenberg) – tattoo artist
- Elsa von Freytag-Loringhoven – avant-garde, Dadaist artist, and poet
- Baroness Hilla von Rebay – abstract painter, helped establish the Solomon R. Guggenheim Museum in New York City
- Karl Ferdinand Wimar – painter
- Matt Groening - animator, creator of The Simpsons and Futurama, father is of German-Canadian descent
- Tom Ruegger - animator at Warner Bros. Animation and Disney, creator of Tiny Toon Adventures, Animaniacs, Histeria and The 7D
- Stephen Hillenburg - animator, creator of SpongeBob SquarePants
- Chuck Jones
- Tex Avery

=== Authors and writers ===
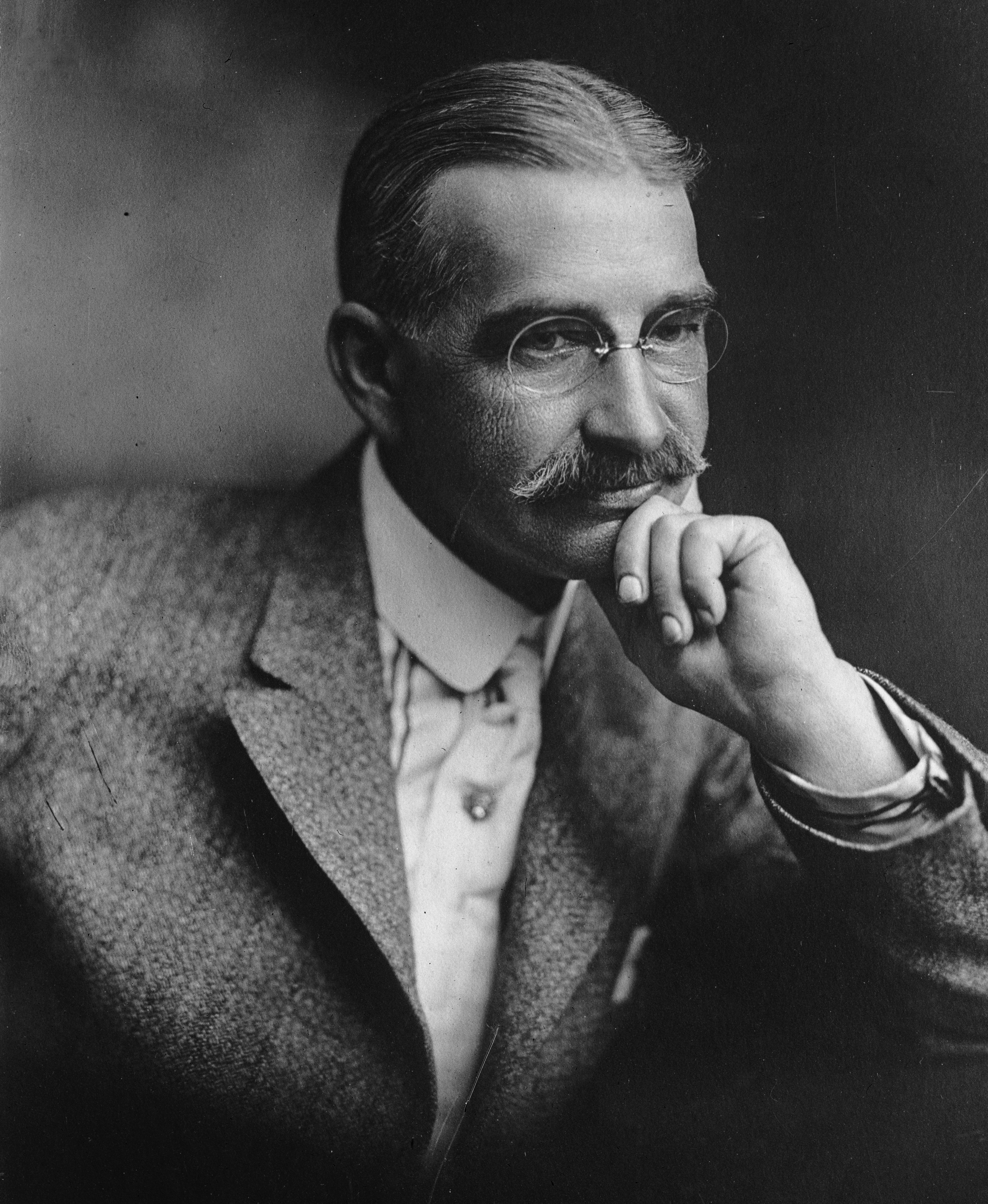
L. Frank Baum

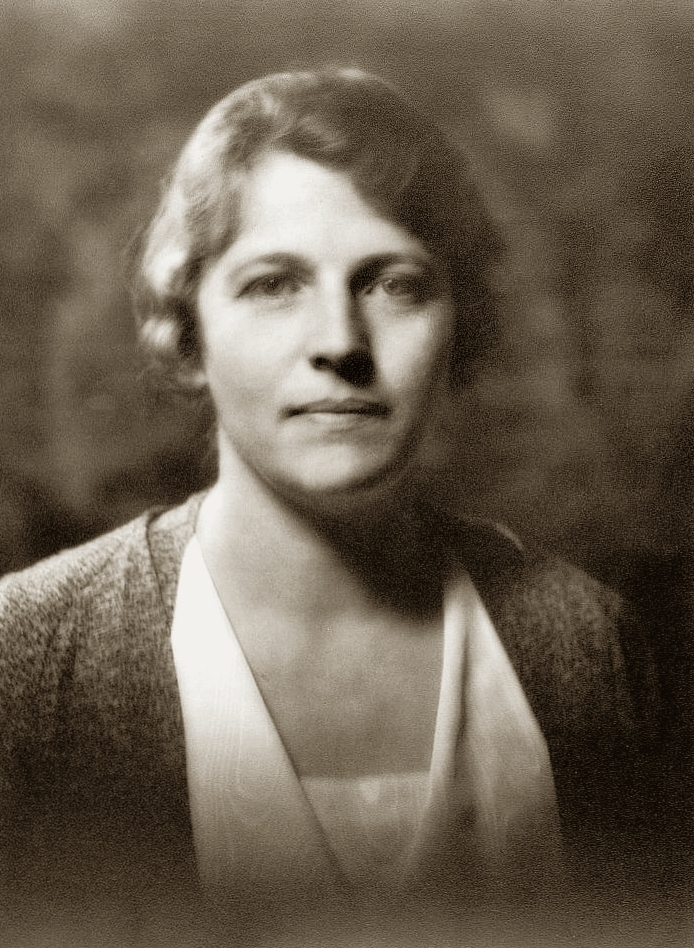
Pearl S. Buck

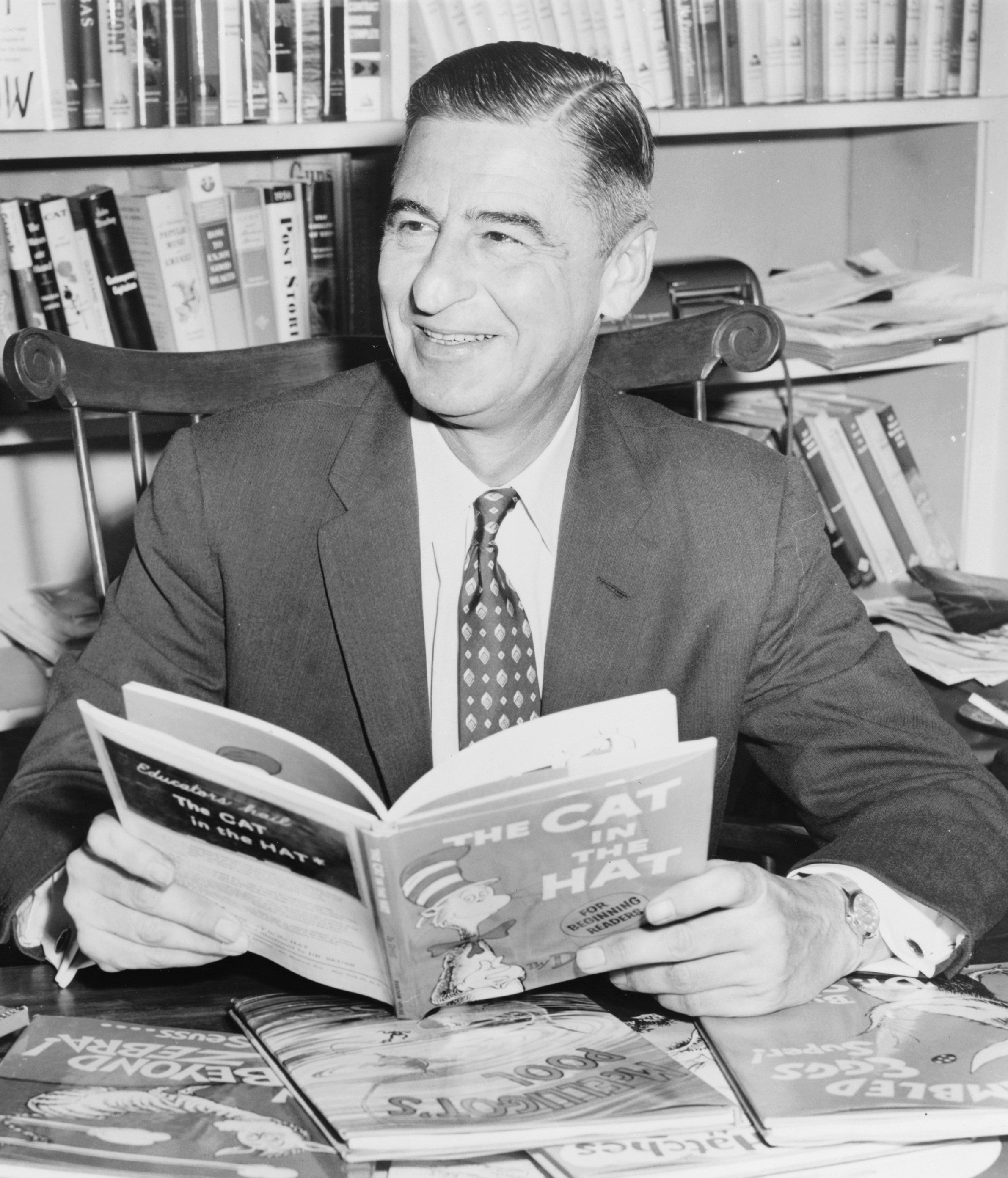
Dr. Seuss

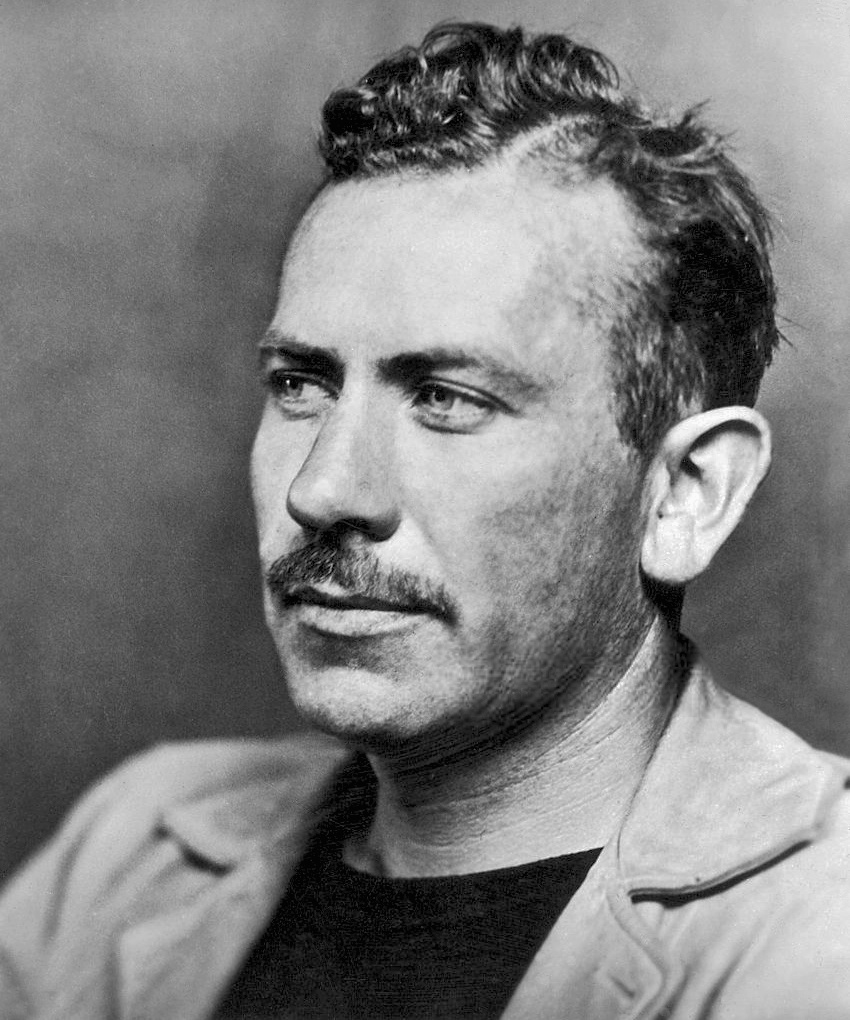
John Steinbeck

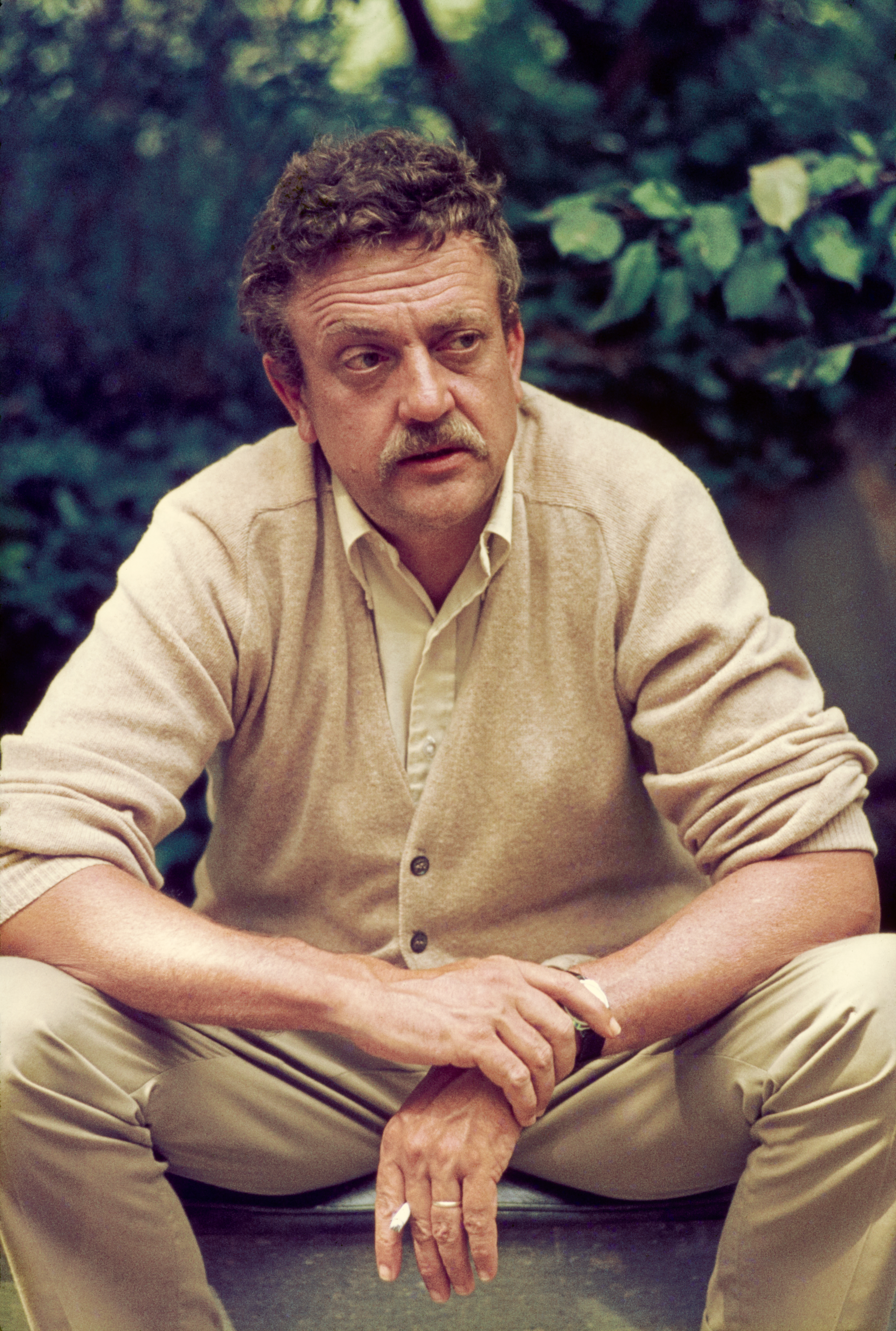
Kurt Vonnegut

- Kathy Acker – author
- Sade Baderinwa – news reporter-journalist
- Matthias Bartgis – printer and publisher
- L. Frank Baum – author, actor, and independent filmmaker best known as the creator of The Wonderful Wizard of Oz
- Dan Brown – author of thriller novels, known for the Robert Langdon series which includes The Da Vinci Code
- Pearl S. Buck – writer and novelist, first American woman to win the Nobel Prize in Literature
- Charles Bukowski – poet and novelist
- Edgar Rice Burroughs – writer, creator of Tarzan
- Caspar Butz – journalist, politician
- Clive Cussler – adventure author and undersea explorer
- George DiCaprio – writer, editor, and major west coast underground comic book distributor
- Theodore Dreiser – author of the naturalist school, known for dealing with the gritty reality of life
- Gottfried Duden – travel author
- Roger Ebert – Pulitzer Prize-winning film critic, journalist, and screenwriter
- Martin Ebon – author of non-fiction books from the paranormal to politics
- Max Ehrmann – widely known for his 1927 prose poem "Desiderata" (Latin: "things desired").
- Joseph Eiboeck – newspaper editor and publisher of Iowa Staats-Anzeiger and author of The Germans in Iowa and Their Achievements
- Charles Follen – poet and patriot
- Cornelia Funke – author
- Geoffrey Hartman – literary theorist
- Ursula Hegi – novelist
- Patricia Highsmith – novelist known for her psychological thrillers
- Friedrich Hirth – sinologue
- Max Hofmann – correspondent
- William Dean Howells – realist novelist, literary critic, and playwright, nicknamed "The Dean of American Letters"
- Amal Kassir – international award-winning spoken word poet
- Stephen King – author
- Chuck Klosterman – writer
- Siegfried Kracauer – film historian, sociologist and author
- Herbert Arthur Krause – historian
- D.L. Lang – poet laureate of Vallejo, California
- Fritz Leiber – science fiction writer
- Walter Lippman – writer, journalist, and political commentator
- H. L. Mencken – journalist
- Henry Miller – writer and painter
- Anna Balmer Myers – author of Mennonite (Pennsylvania Dutch) novels
- Oswald Ottendorfer – journalist associated with the development of the German-language New Yorker Staats-Zeitung into a major newspaper
- Sylvia Plath – poet, novelist, and short story writer
- Frederik Pohl – science-fiction writer, editor
- Erich Maria Remarque – German-born author, naturalized United States citizen
- Conrad Richter – Pulitzer Prize-winning novelist
- Hope Aldrich Rockefeller – journalist
- Irma S. Rombauer – author of The Joy of Cooking
- Virginia Satir – author and psychotherapist, called the "mother of family therapy"
- Diane Sawyer – journalist
- Jack Schaefer – author of Shane
- Paul Schrader – screenwriter, film director, and film critic
- Charles Sealsfield – pseudonym of Austrian American author of novels and travelogues Carl (or Karl) Anton Postl
- Dr. Seuss (born Theodor Seuss Geisel) – writer and cartoonist
- Maria Shriver – journalist and author
- Mona Simpson – novelist and university professor, biological younger sister of the late Apple Inc. co-founder Steve Jobs
- Curt Siodmak – screenwriter
- Nicholas Sparks – author and screenwriter
- Gertrude Stein – author
- John Steinbeck – Nobel prize-winning author, one of the best-known and most widely read American writers of the 20th century
- Wallace Stevens – modernist poet
- Gene Stratton-Porter – novelist and silent film-era producer
- Henry F. Urban – journalist, author
- Henry Villard – journalist
- Kurt Vonnegut – novelist
- Tessa Gräfin von Walderdorff – writer, socialite
- August Wilson (born Frederick August Kittel Jr.) - playwright

== Businesspeople and entrepreneurs ==
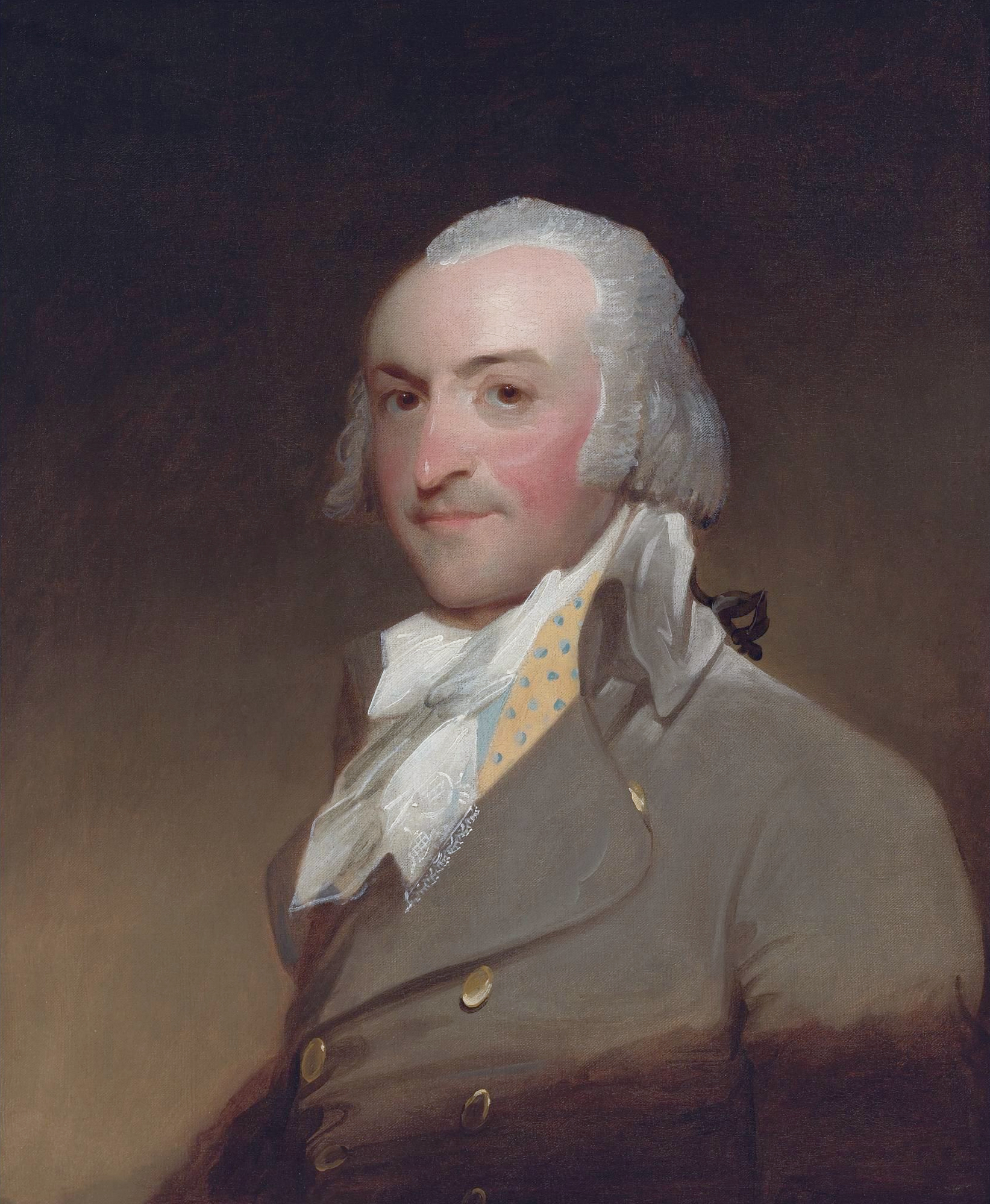
John Jacob Astor

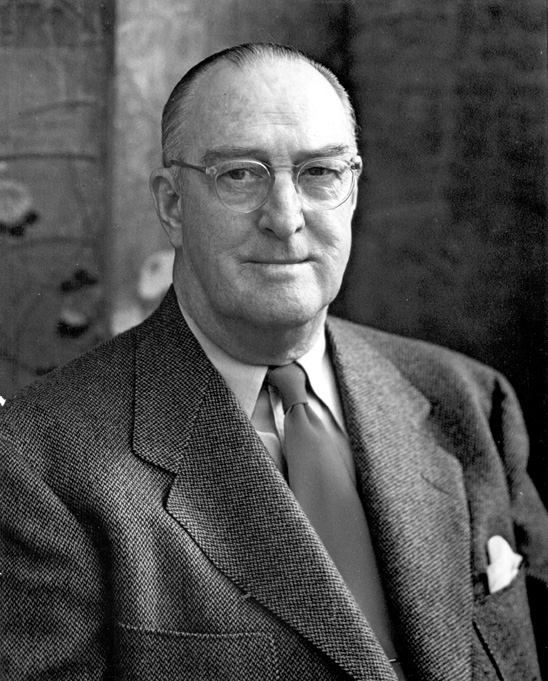
William E. Boeing

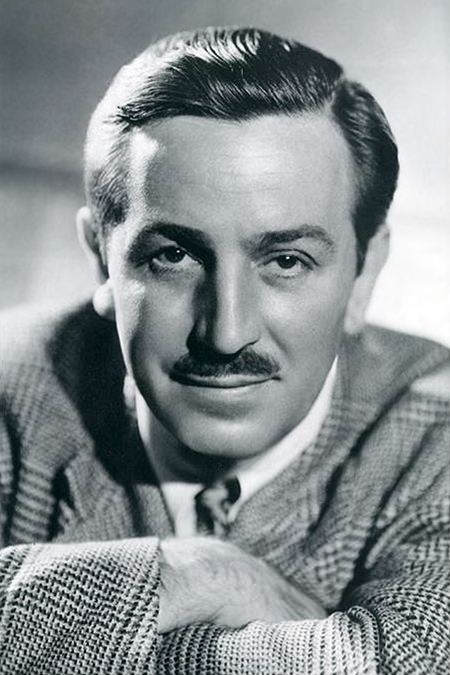
Walt Disney

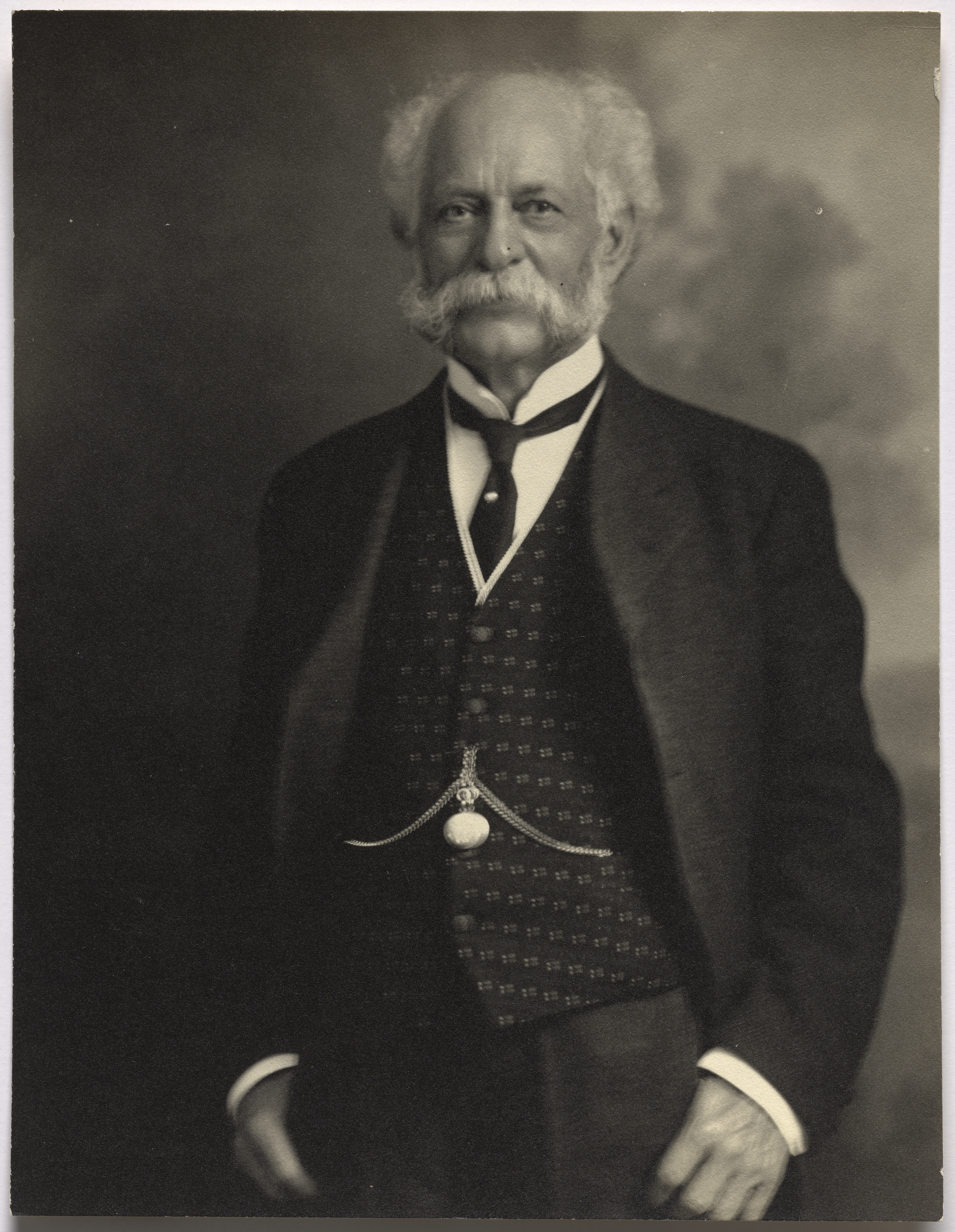
Henry J. Heinz

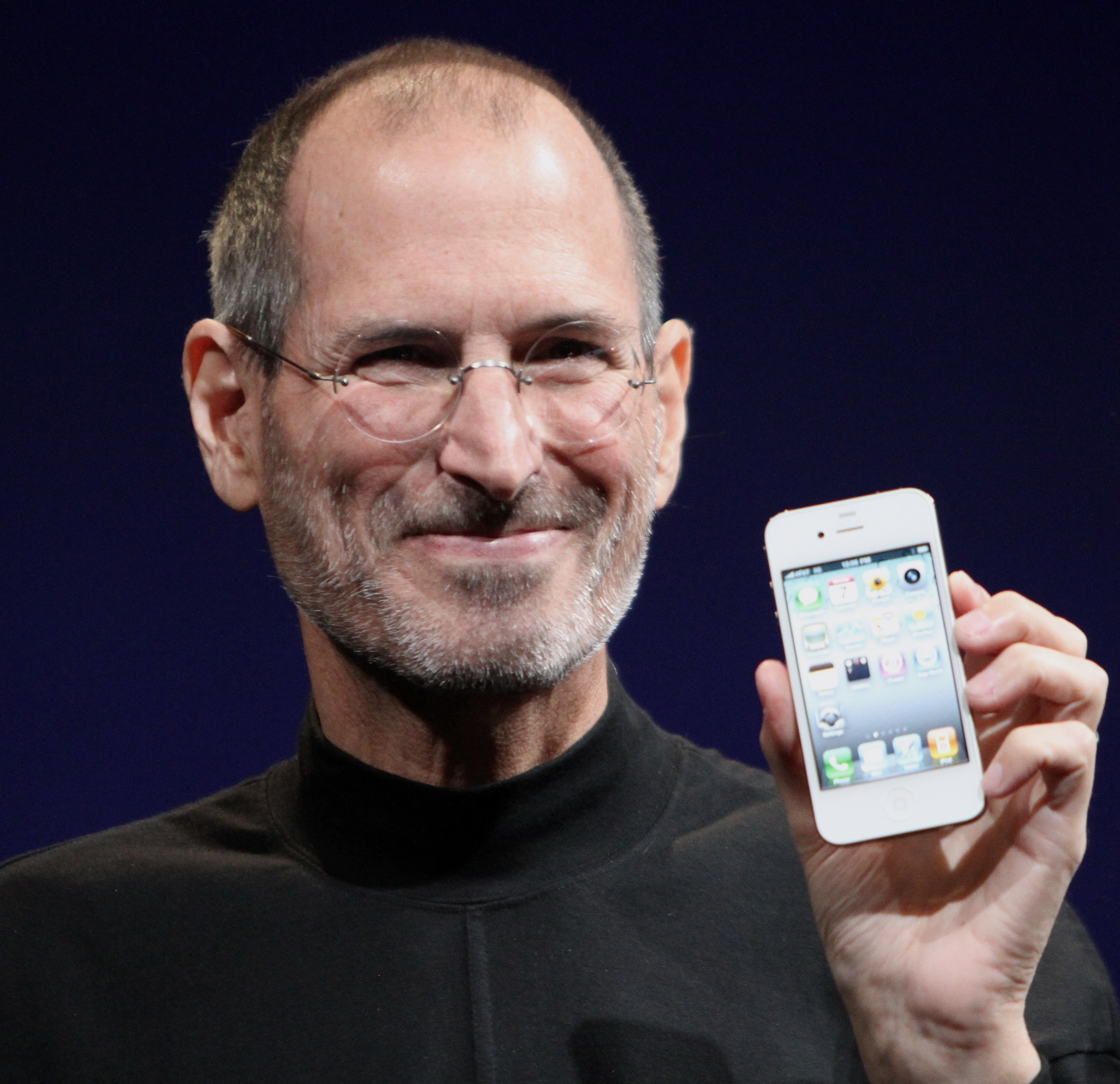
Steve Jobs

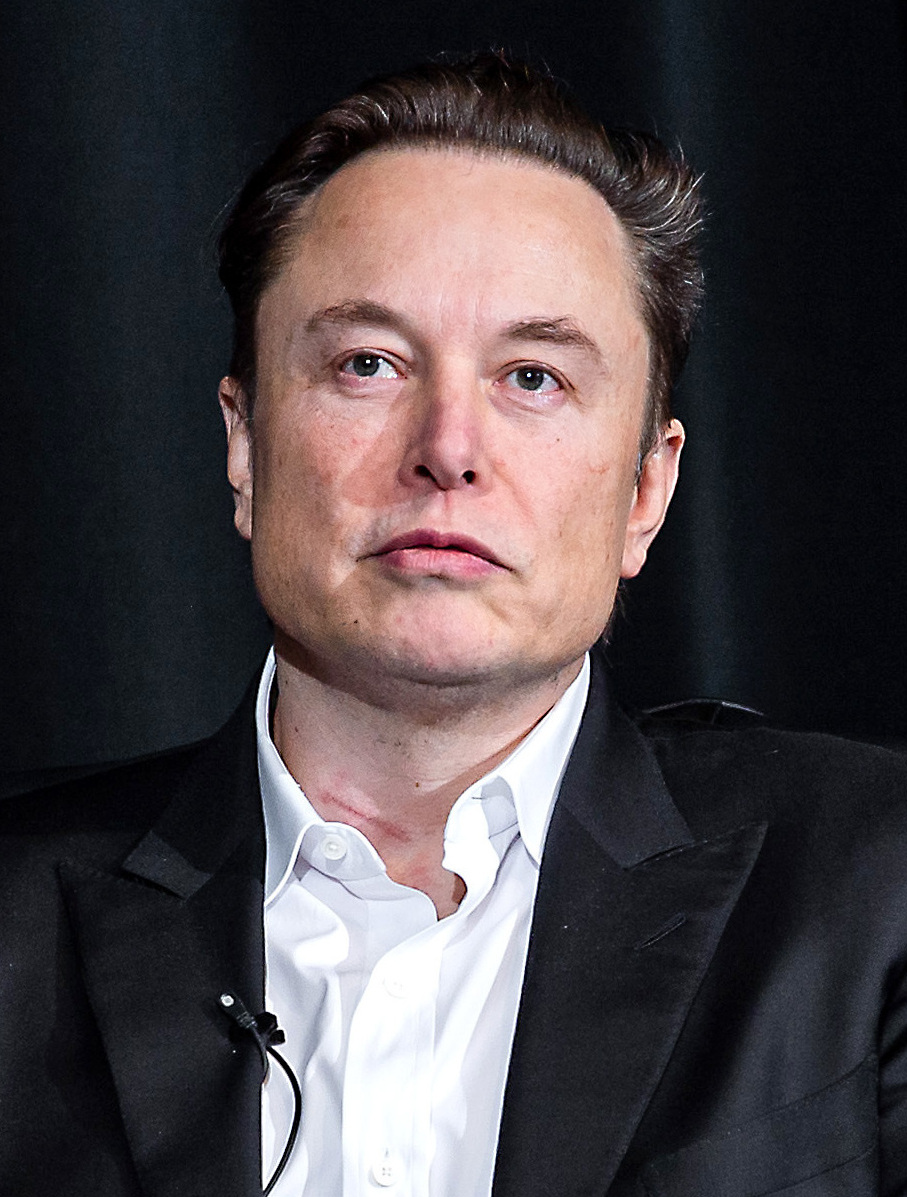
Elon Musk

- Philip Anschutz – billionaire businessman who owns or controls many companies in a variety of industries
- John Jacob Astor – business magnate, merchant and investor and the first multi-millionaire in the United States
- John Jacob Astor IV – millionaire businessman, real estate developer, inventor, writer and a lieutenant colonel in the Spanish–American War
- William Waldorf Astor, 1st Viscount Astor – financier and statesman
- Ralph Baer – father of the home video game console
- John Jacob Bausch – optician who co-founded Bausch & Lomb
- Andy von Bechtolsheim – co-founder of Sun Microsystems and one of the first investors in Google
- Maximilian Berlitz – Berlitz Language School
- Isaac Wolfe Bernheim – businessman notable for starting the I. W. Harper brand of premium bourbon whiskey
- Bernard Baruch – financier, stock-market speculator, statesman, and political consultant
- William Edward Boeing – aviation pioneer who founded The Boeing Company
- Paul Bonwit – founder of Bonwit Teller department store in New York City
- Emil J. Brach – founder of Brach's Candy
- George Brumder – newspaper publisher and businessman in Milwaukee, Wisconsin
- Clyde Cessna – aircraft designer, aviator, and founder of the Cessna Aircraft Corporation
- Walter Chrysler – Chrysler automobile developer
- Frank Crowninshield – first editor of Vanity Fair magazine
- George A. Dickel – whiskey distributor; born in Grünberg, Hesse
- Chris Deering – businessman and marketer best known for his role as president of Sony Computer Entertainment Europe
- Noah Dietrich – CEO of the Howard Hughes empire
- Walt Disney – film producer, director, screenwriter, voice actor, animator, entrepreneur, and philanthropist
- August Duesenberg – automobile pioneer manufacturer
- Fred Duesenberg – automobile pioneer designer, manufacturer and sportsman
- Edward Filene – businessman, social entrepreneur and philanthropist
- Harvey Firestone – founder of the Firestone Tire and Rubber Company
- Henry Flagler – industrialist, co-founder of Standard Oil
- Nicholas C. Forstmann – one of the founding partners of Forstmann Little & Company, a private equity firm
- Theodore J. Forstmann – one of the founding partners of Forstmann Little & Company, a private equity firm, and chairman and CEO of IMG, a leading global sports and media company
- Henry Clay Frick – industrialist, financier and art patron, co-founder of U.S. Steel
- Bill Gates – software magnate and investor, founder and former chairman of Microsoft
- Henry Giessenbier – banker and founder of the Young Men's Progressive Civic Association in 1915 and the United States Junior Chamber in 1920
- Friedrich Gretsch – industrialist, founder of Gretsch
- Henry J. Heinz – H. J. Heinz Company ketchup founder
- H. J. Heinz II – best known as Jack Heinz, a business executive and CEO of the H. J. Heinz Company
- H. Robert Heller – President and CEO of VISA U.S.A. and Federal Reserve Board of Governors
- Richard Hellmann – company founder of Hellmanns
- Joseph A. Hemann – educator, newspaper publisher, and banker
- Milton S. Hershey – Hershey chocolate founder
- Barron Hilton – chairman of the Hilton Hotel chain and grandfather of Paris Hilton
- Conrad Hilton – founder of the Hilton Hotel chain and great-grandfather of Paris Hilton and Nicky Hilton
- Richard Hilton – hotelier and real estate entrepreneur, father of Paris Hilton
- George A. Hormel – founder of Hormel Foods Corporation
- Steve Jobs – software tycoon, co-founder and CEO of Apple Inc.
- Max Kade – pharmaceutical tycoon, endowed the Max Kade Foundation
- Otto Hermann Kahn – investment banker
- Henry J. Kaiser – industrialist and health care pioneer
- Jawed Karim – co-founder of YouTube and designer of key parts of PayPal
- Edgar J. Kaufmann – department store entrepreneur
- Peter Kern – confectioner and mayor of Knoxville, Tennessee
- John Kluge – television industry mogul
- Klaus Kleinfeld – business executive
- William Knabe – industrialist and piano-manufacturer
- James L. Kraft – first to patent processed cheese; founder of Kraft Foods
- Bernard Kroger – chain grocer founder of the Kroger chain
- Louis Kurz – major publisher of chromolithographs in the late 19th century
- Johan Adam Lemp – father of modern brewing in St. Louis, started the William J. Lemp Brewing Company
- James Lick – businessman and philanthropist, namesake of the Lick Observatory
- Alfred Lion – co-founder of Blue Note Records
- Solomon Loeb – banker, co-founder of Kuhn, Loeb & Co.
- Grover Loening – aircraft manufacturer
- Henry Lomb – co-founded Bausch & Lomb
- George Lucas – film director and producer
- Mark Zuckerberg – CEO and owner of Meta Platforms
- Adolph Luetgert – Chicago businessman of A.L. Luetgert Sausage & Packing Company
- Peter Luger – steak restaurateur
- Abby Rockefeller Mauzé – philanthropist
- Oscar Mayer – meat entrepreneur
- Frederick L. Maytag – founder of the Maytag Company
- George W. Merck – scientist and former president of Merck & Co
- Fred G. Meyer – founder of Fred Meyer
- Maxey Dell Moody Jr. – founder of MOBRO Marine, Inc. and CEO of M. D. Moody & Sons, Inc.
- Elon Musk – co-founder of PayPal Inc.; founder of SolarCity, SpaceX, Hyperloop, and Tesla Motors
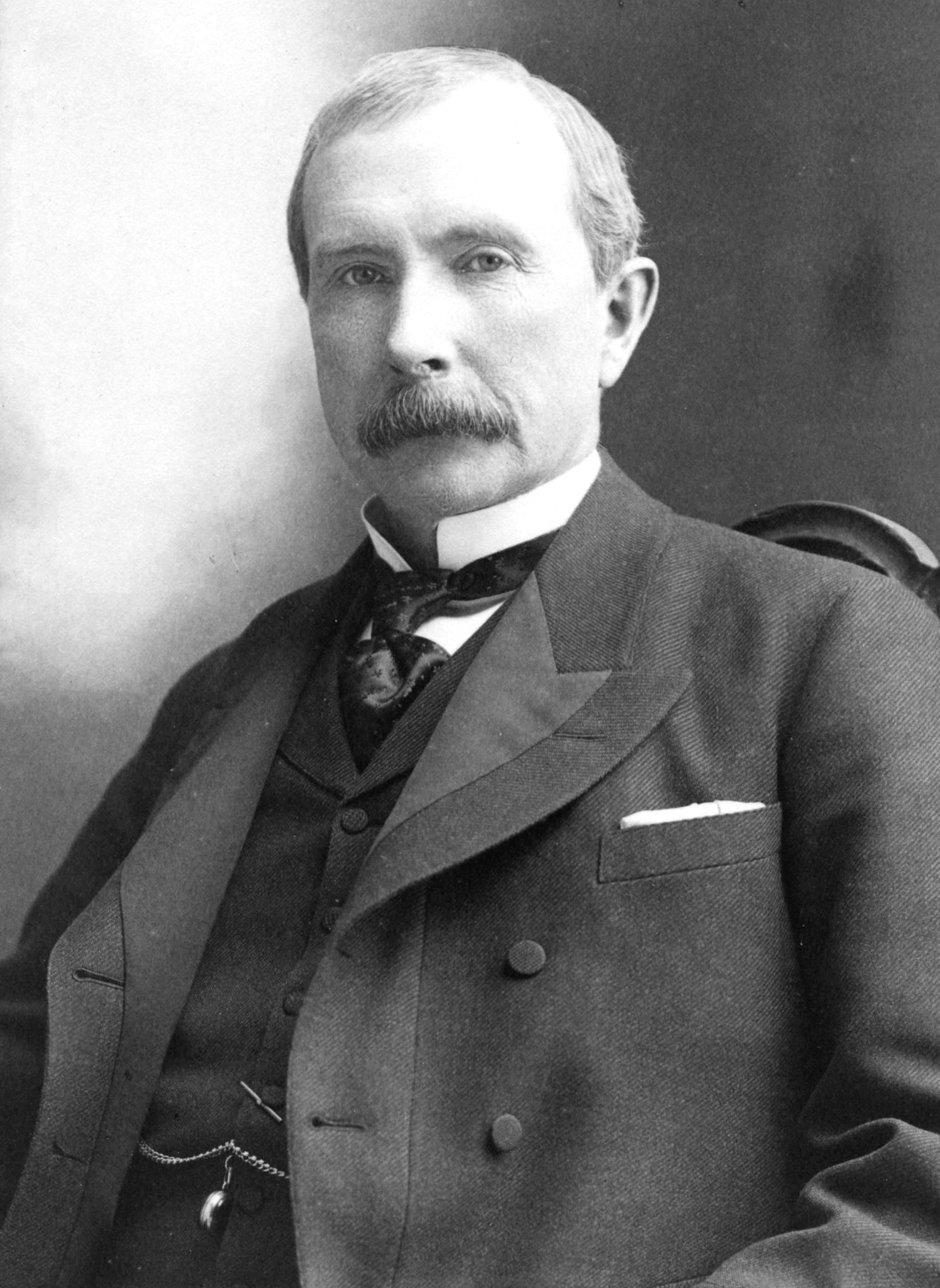
  John D. Rockefeller
- Carrie Marcus Neiman – co-founder of the Neiman-Marcus department store
- Douglas R. Oberhelman – former CEO and Executive Chairman of Caterpillar Inc. in Peoria, Illinois
- Adolph Ochs – newspaper publisher and former owner of The New York Times and The Chattanooga Times (now the Chattanooga Times Free Press)
- Hermann Oelrichs – shipping magnate and owner of Norddeutsche Lloyd Shipping
- Albrecht Pagenstecher – pioneer of the modern paper industry
- Charles Pfizer – founded the Pfizer Inc. pharmaceutical company
- John C. Pritzlaff – founder of the John Pritzlaff Hardware Company, the largest wholesale hardware store in the Midwestern United States until its closure in 1958
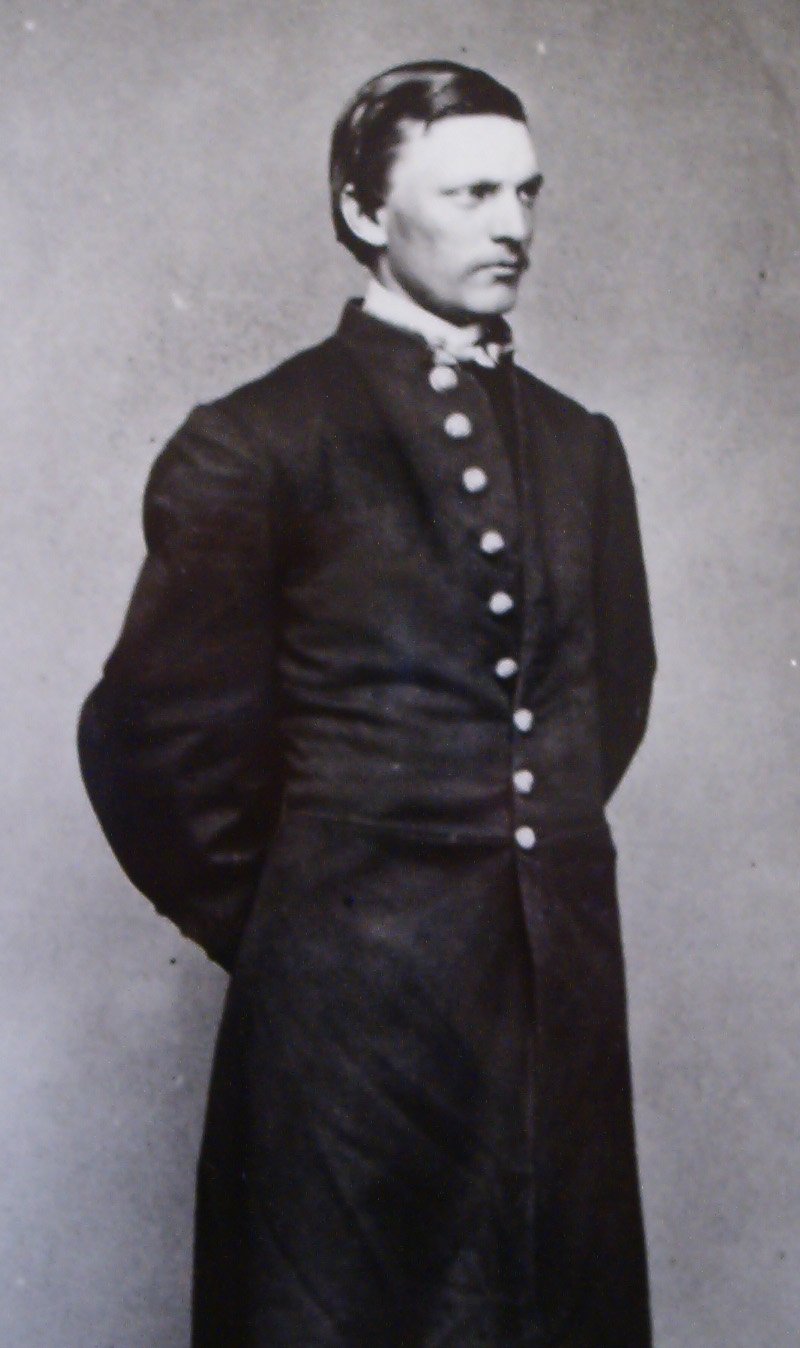
  Washington Roebling
- John J. Raskob – builder of the Empire State Building
- Francis Joseph Reitz – banker, civic leader, and philanthropist
- John Augustus Reitz – known as the "Lumber Baron", an entrepreneur, industrialist, banker, civic leader, and philanthropist
- George Remus – famous Cincinnati lawyer and bootlegger during the Prohibition era
- Edwin O. Reischauer – diplomat, educator, and professor at Harvard University
- William Rittenhouse – built the first paper mill in America
- David Rockefeller – banker, philanthropist, and world statesman
- John D. Rockefeller – oil magnate and philanthropist
- William Rockefeller Jr. – industrialist and financier
- John D. Rockefeller Jr. – industrialist and philanthropist
- John D. Rockefeller III – industrialist and philanthropist
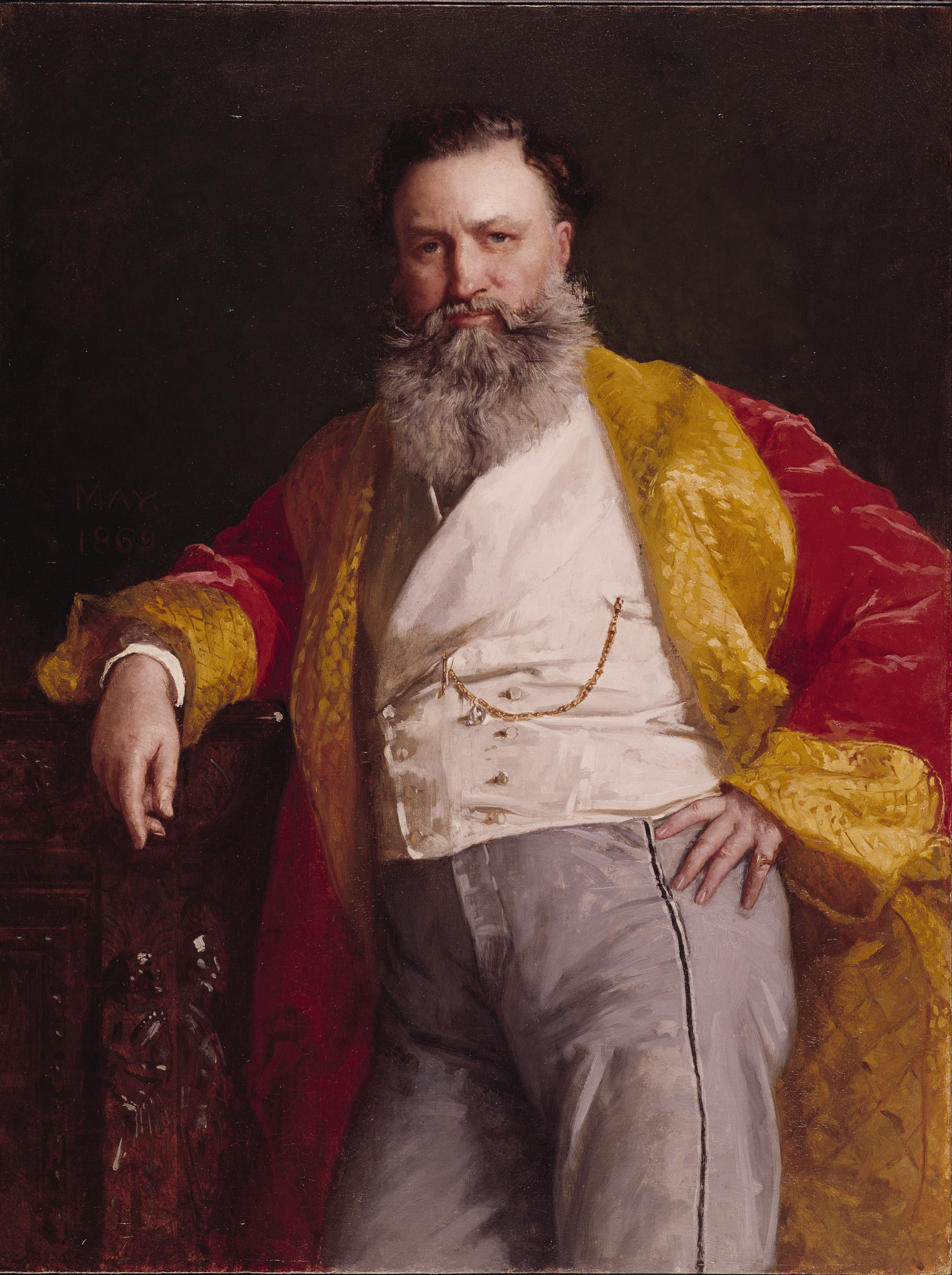
  Isaac Singer
- Laurance Rockefeller – venture capitalist, financier, philanthropist and major conservationist
- John Augustus Roebling – civil engineer, one of the pioneers in the construction of suspension bridges
- Washington Roebling – civil engineer best known for his work on the Brooklyn Bridge
- Jim Rohr – chairman and CEO of PNC Financial Services (PNC Bank)
- Jacob Ruppert – brewer, businessman, National Guard colonel and United States Congressman, owner of New York Yankees from 1915 until 1939
- Christoph Sauer – first German-language printer and publisher in North America
- William Schaus – New York-based art dealer
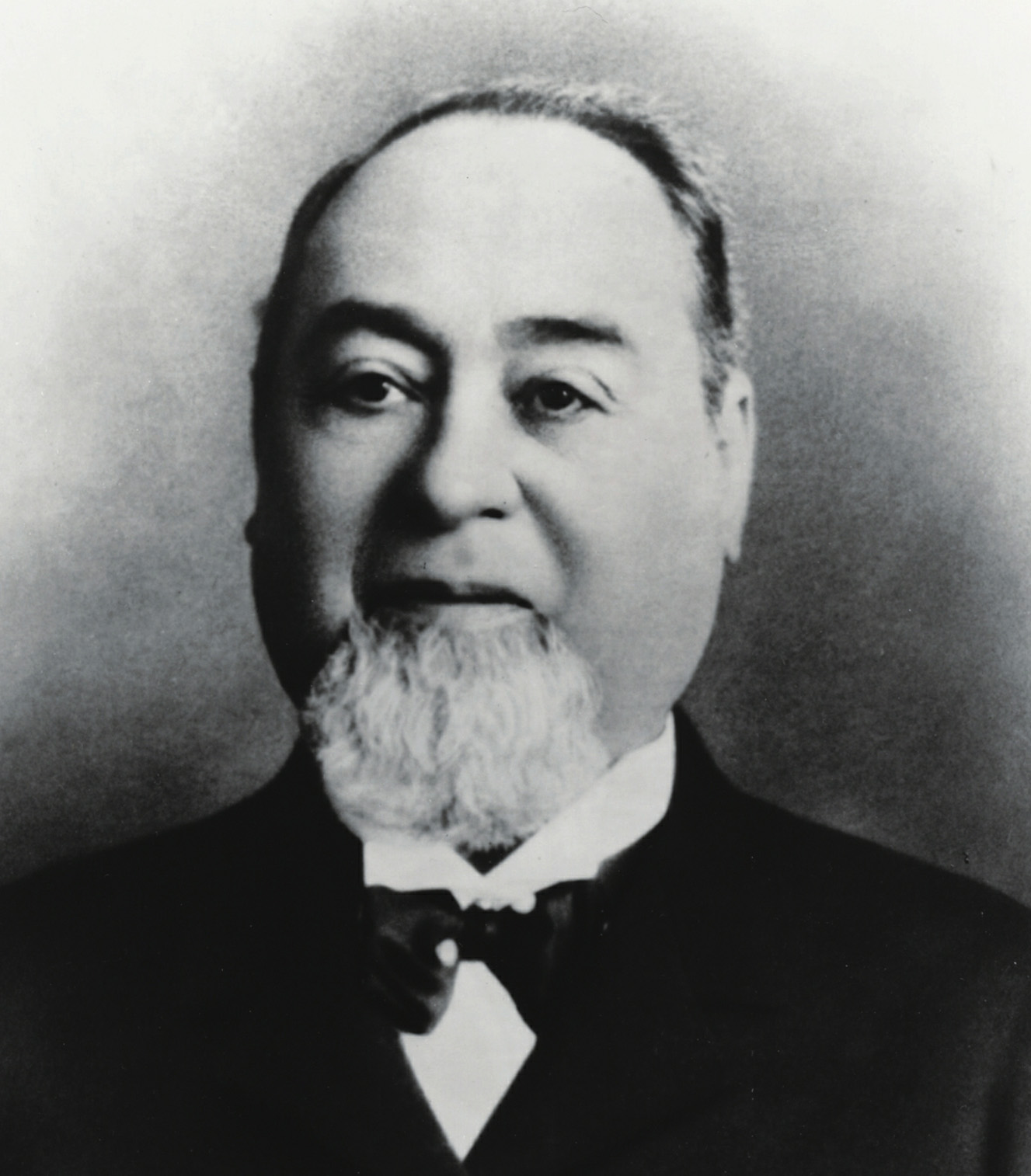
- Levi Strauss
  August Schell – founded The August Schell Brewing Company in 1860, the second oldest family-owned brewery in America
- Walter Schlage – engineer, inventor, and businessman; founder of Schlage Manufacturing company in San Francisco
- John Schnatter – founder of Papa John's Pizza
- Jacob Schiff – banker and philanthropist
- Julius Schmid – creator of the Sheik condom and the Ramses condom
- Charles M. Schwab – steel magnate (Bethlehem Steel)
- Barron Trump - Political Aid
- Frank Seiberling – inventor and founder of the Goodyear Tire and Rubber Company, Seiberling Rubber Company, Stan Hywet Hall and Gardens
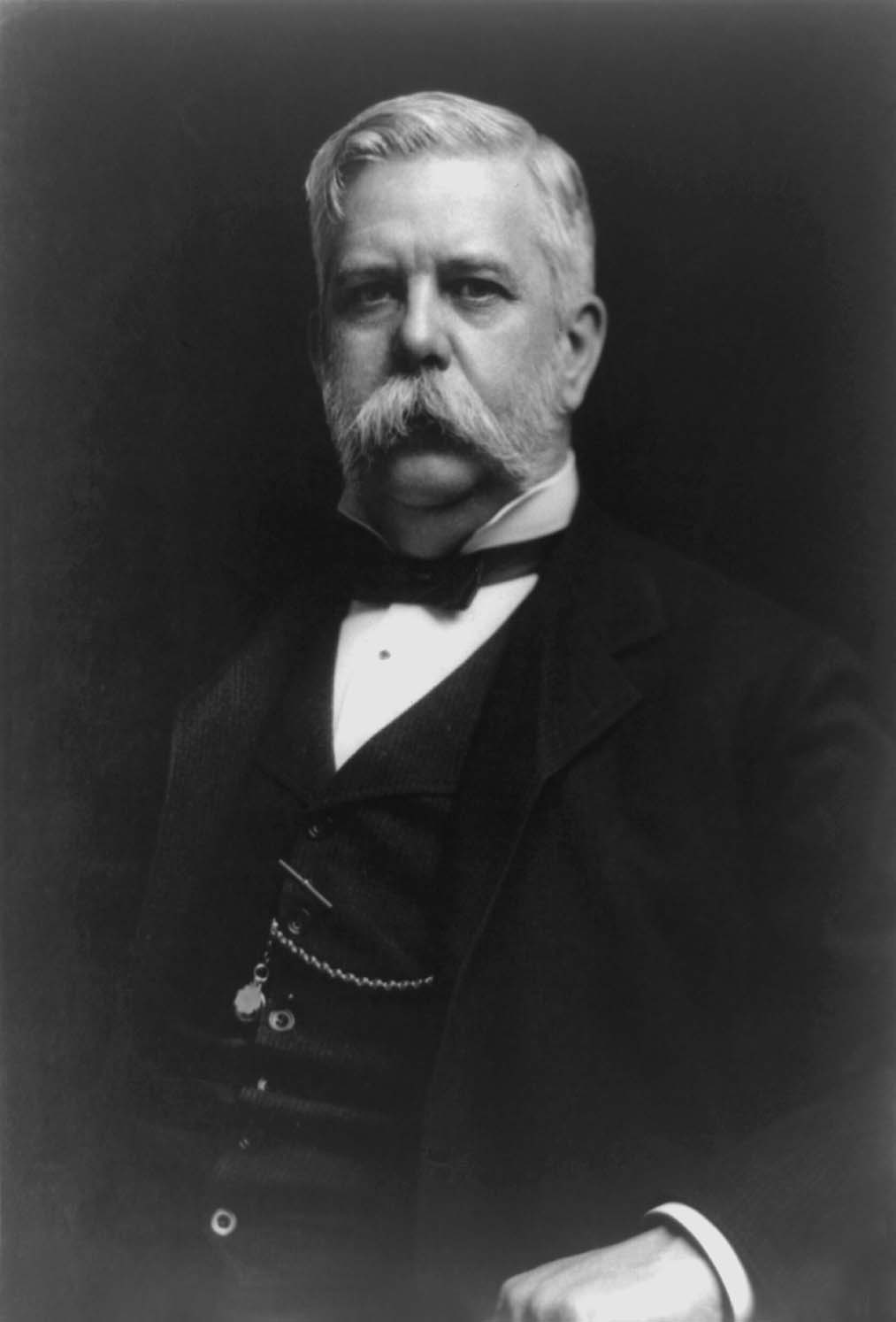
  George Westinghouse
- John Seiberling – founder and inventor of one of the first reaping machines
- Isaac Singer – inventor, actor, and sewing machine entrepreneur
- Joseph Spiegel – founder of Spiegel catalog
- Claus Spreckels – industrialist
- George Steinbrenner – shipping and sports franchise entrepreneur and late owner of the New York Yankees
- Heinrich Engelhard Steinweg – Steinway pianos manufacturer
- Henry William Stiegel – glassmaker and ironmaster and an active lay Lutheran and associate of Henry Melchior Muhlenberg
- Chris Strachwitz – founder and president of Arhoolie Records
- Levi Strauss – creator of the first company to manufacture blue jeans
- Clement Studebaker – founded Studebaker, a wagon, carriage and car manufacturer
- Arthur Hays Sulzberger – publisher of The New York Times, 1935–1961
- John Sutter – pioneer settler/colonizer
- Peter Thiel – co-founder of PayPal Inc.; first outside investor in Facebook, Inc.
- Otto Timm – aircraft manufacturer
- Robert Uihlein Jr. – heir, businessman, polo player and philanthropist
- Frederick Vogel – tanner and businessman from Milwaukee, Wisconsin, who spent a single one-year term as a member of the Wisconsin State Assembly
- Charles Von der Ahe – co-founder of the Vons Supermarket chain
- Wilfred Von der Ahe – co-founder of the Vons Supermarket chain
- The Warburg Family – bankers
- George Westinghouse – engineer and electricity pioneer
- Oscar Werwath – founder and first president of the Milwaukee School of Engineering in Milwaukee, Wisconsin
- Friedrich Weyerhäuser – timber mogul and founder of the Weyerhaeuser
- Francis Wolff – co-founder of Blue Note Records
- Rudolph Wurlitzer – musical instrument entrepreneur
- Frederick G. Zinsser – American chemical company entrepreneur who founded Zinsser & Company, which synthesized organic chemicals

=== Brewers ===
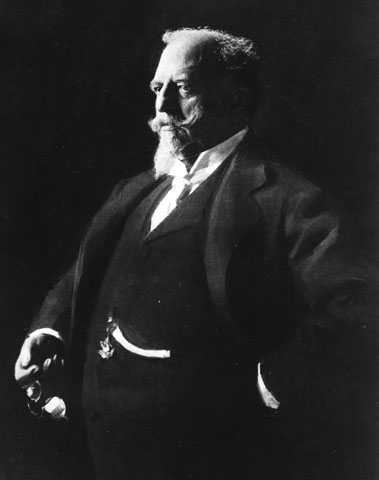
Adolphus Busch

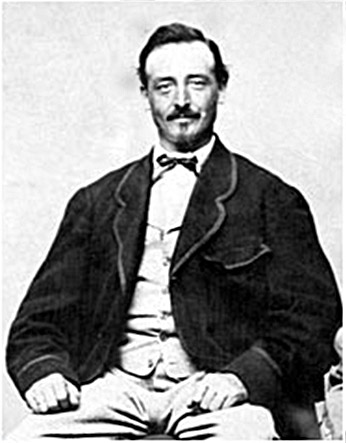
Frederick Miller

- Eberhard Anheuser – soap and candle maker, president and CEO of Eberhard Anheuser and Company, which eventually became Anheuser-Busch
- Valentin Blatz – beer baron, started the Valentin Blatz Brewing Company
- Adolphus Busch – Anheuser-Busch brewing company founder
- Adolphus Busch III – brewing magnate who was the president and CEO of Anheuser-Busch, 1934–1946
- August Anheuser Busch Sr. – brewing magnate who served as the president and CEO of Anheuser-Busch, 1913–1934
- August Busch IV – president and CEO of Anheuser-Busch
- Gussie Busch – company chairman, 1946–1975, of Anheuser-Busch
- Adolph Coors – Coors beer empire founder
- Matthias Haffen – New York City brewer
- Theodore Hamm – founder of Hamm's Brewery
- Frederick Miller – Miller beer creator
- Frederick Pabst – founder of Pabst Brewery (with Philip Best)
- Tom Pastorius – founded Penn Brewery (Pennsylvania Brewing Co.)
- Frederick Schaefer – beer baron, started F. & M. Schaefer Brewing Company
- Joseph Schlitz – beer baron, founded Joseph Schlitz Brewing Company
- Kosmas Spoetzl – brewer, Shiner Brewery
- Peter P. Straub – founder of Straub Brewery
- August Uihlein – Uhrig Brewery and Joseph Schlitz Brewing Company brewer
- Herman Weiss – first brewmaster in Shiner, Texas

=== Distillers ===
- Arthur Phillip Stitzel – founder of the Stitzel–Weller Distillery

== Entertainment ==
=== Actors ===
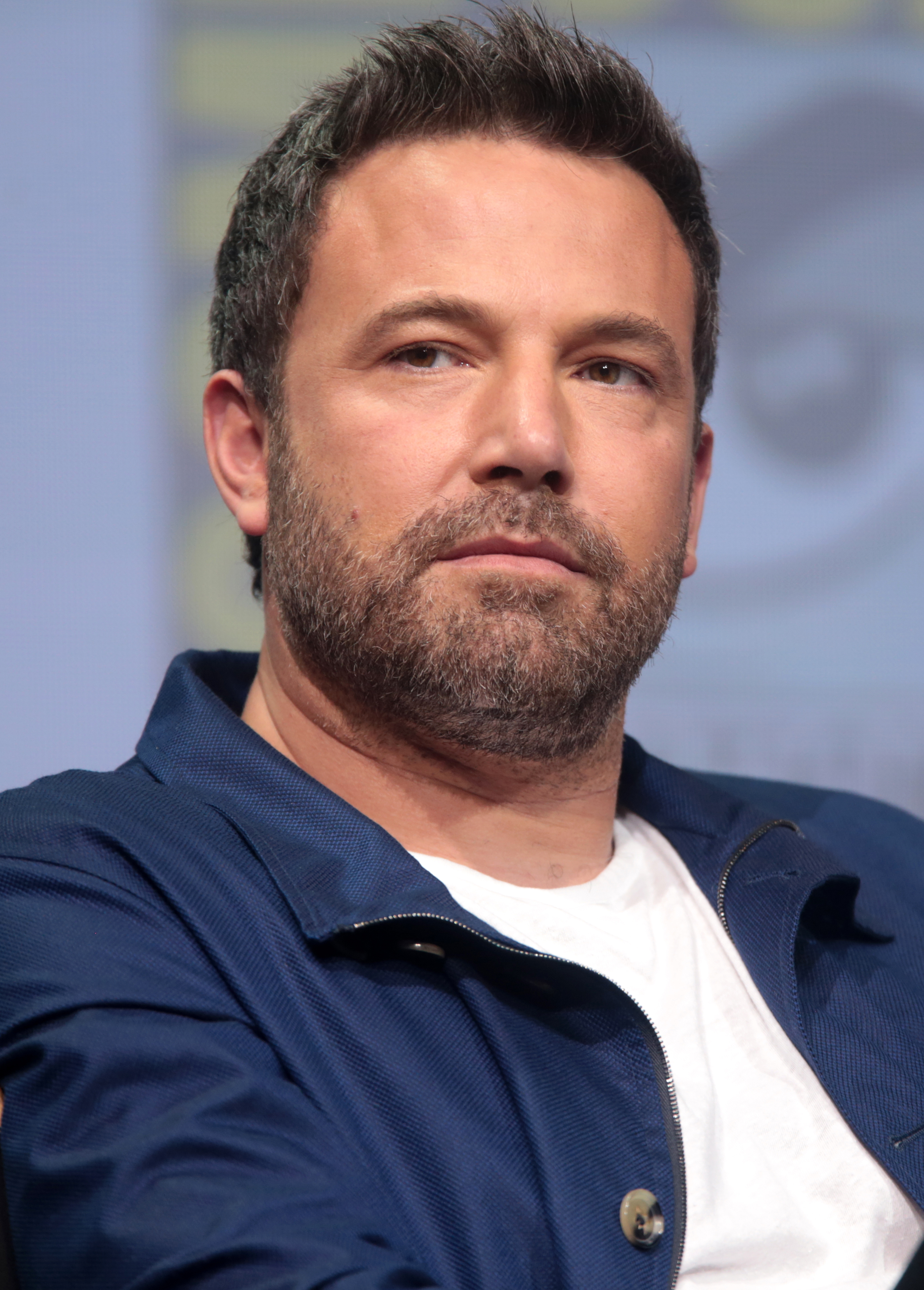
Ben Affleck

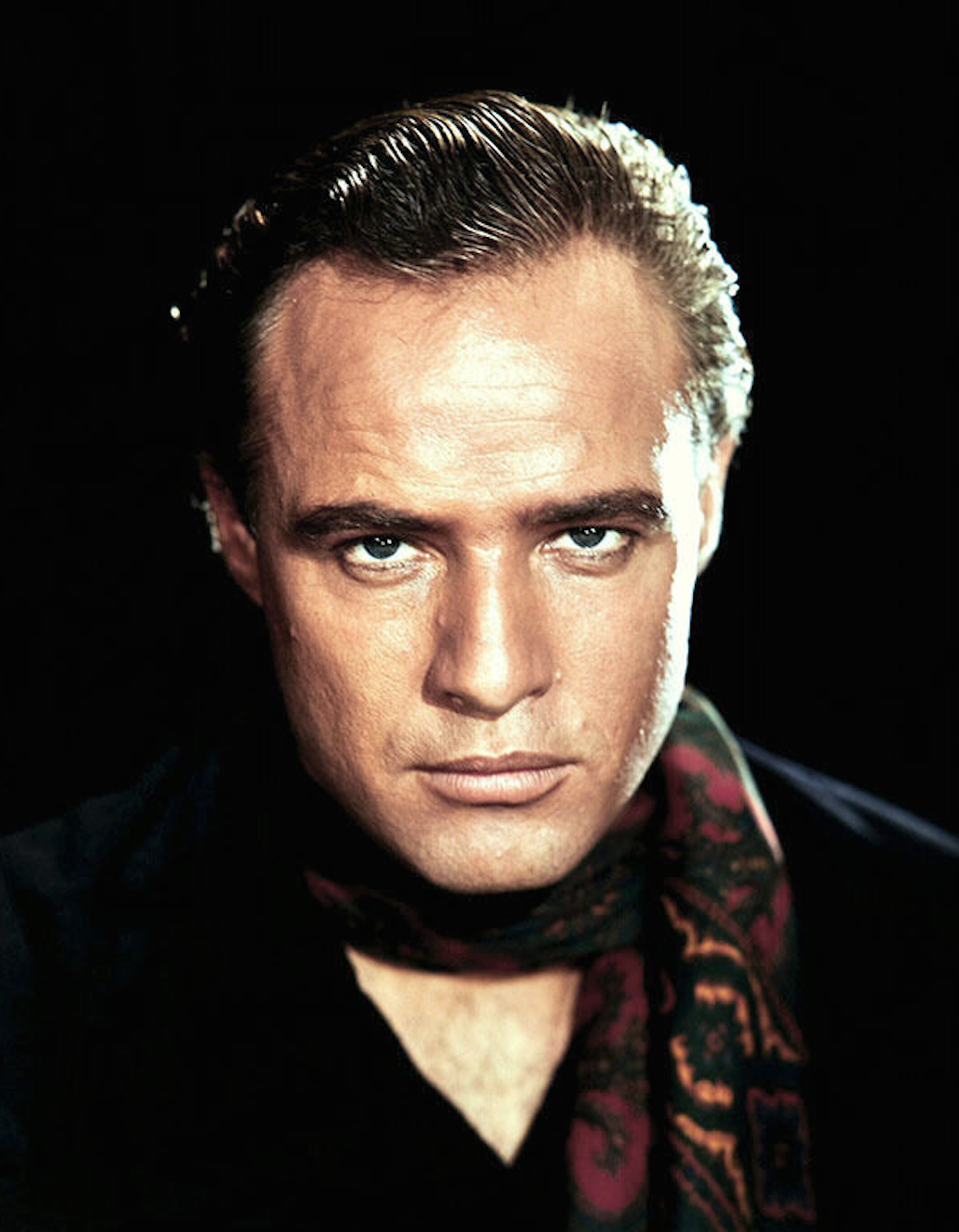
Marlon Brando

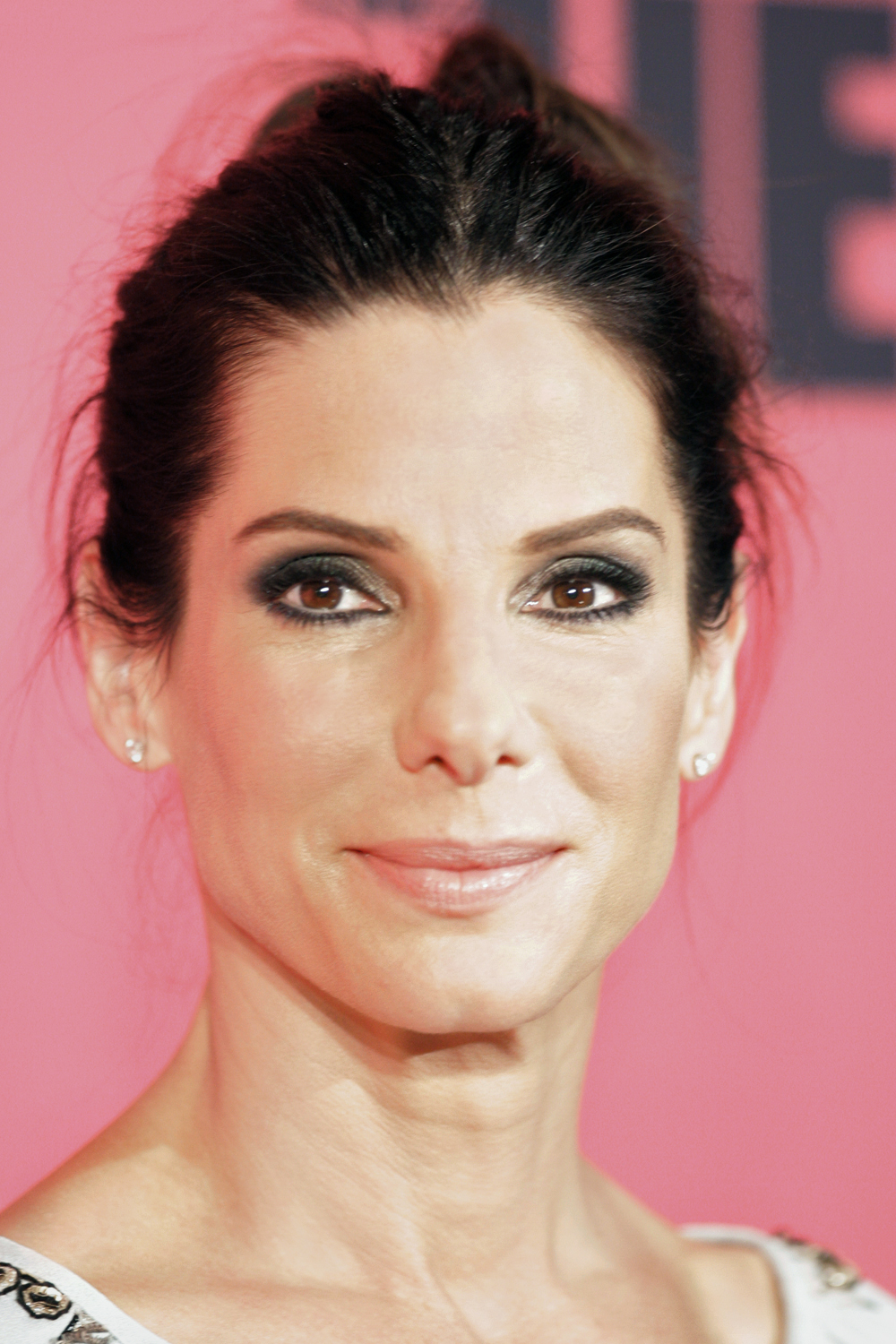
Sandra Bullock

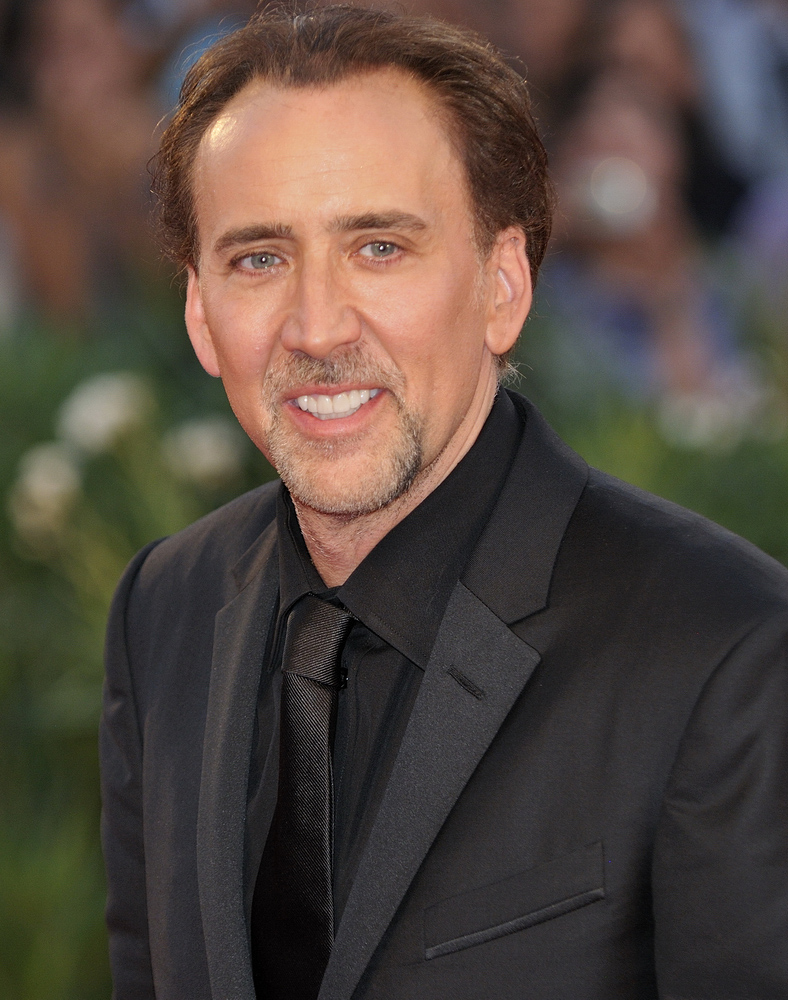
Nicolas Cage

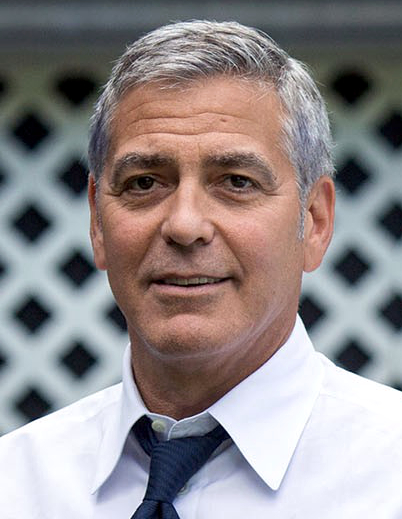
George Clooney

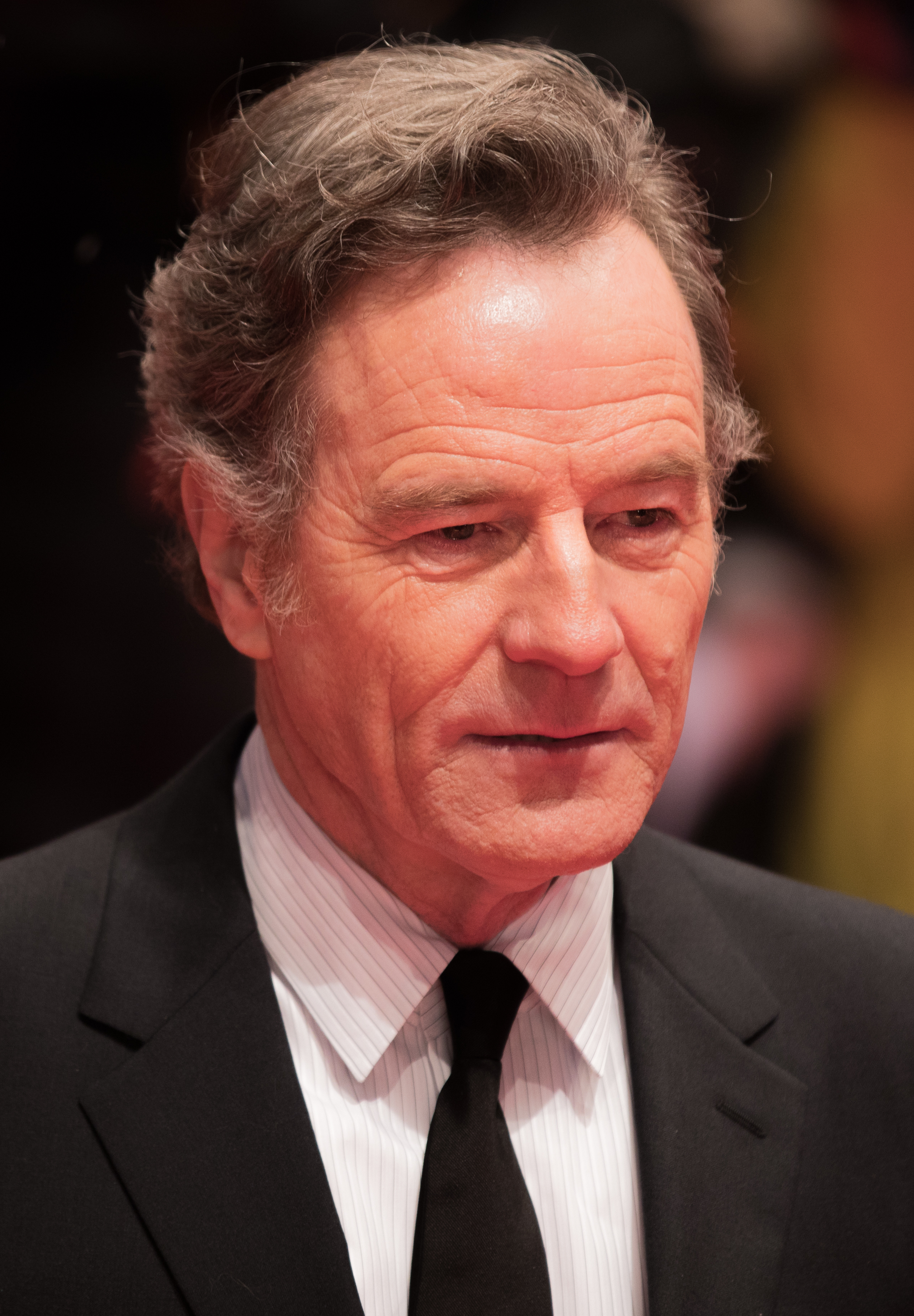
Bryan Cranston

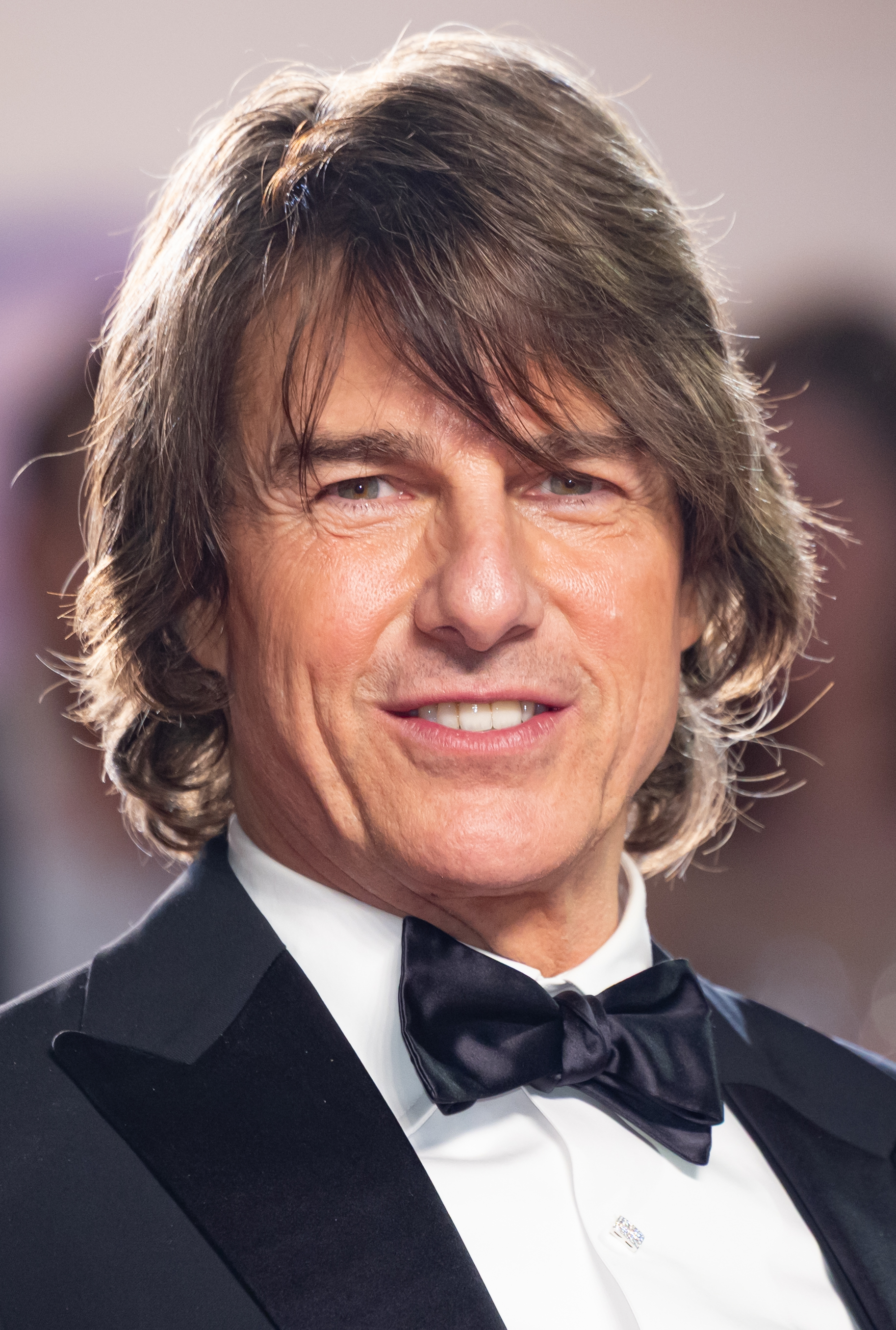
Tom Cruise

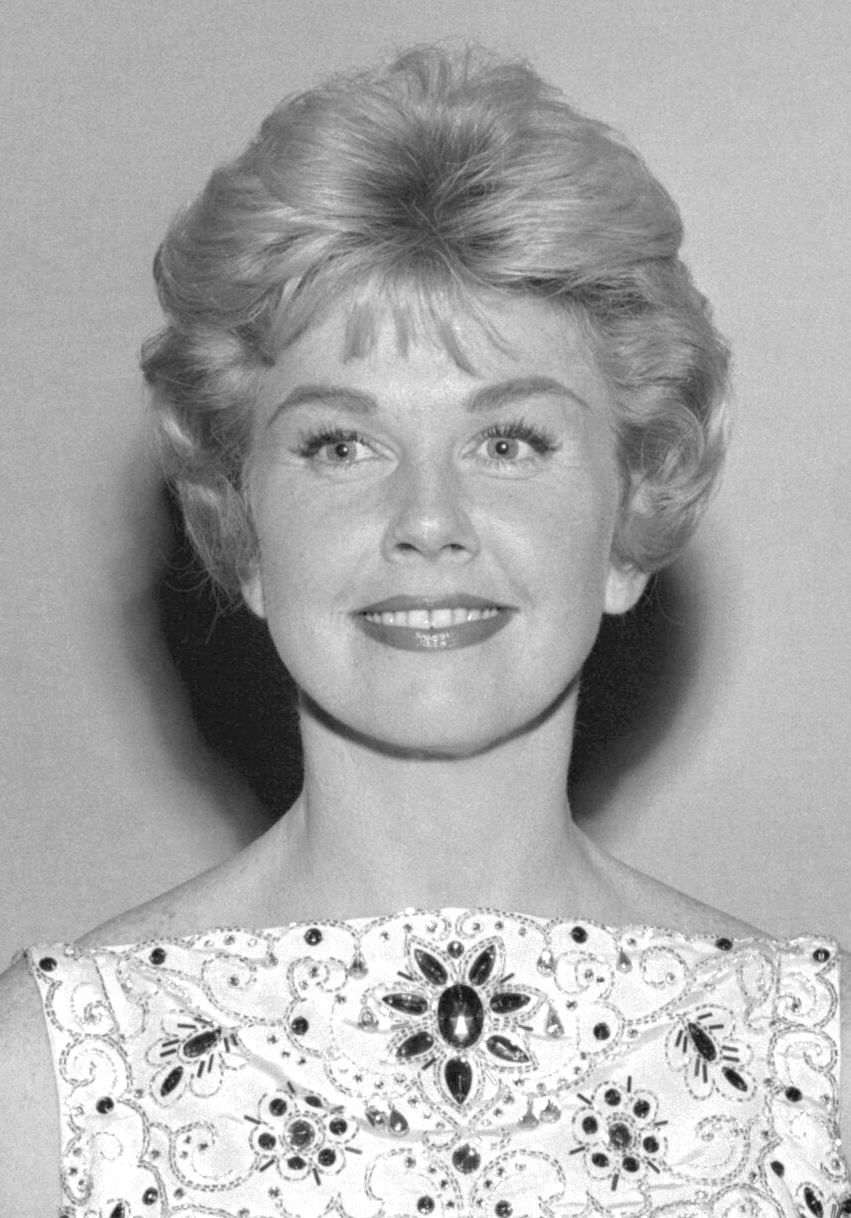
Doris Day

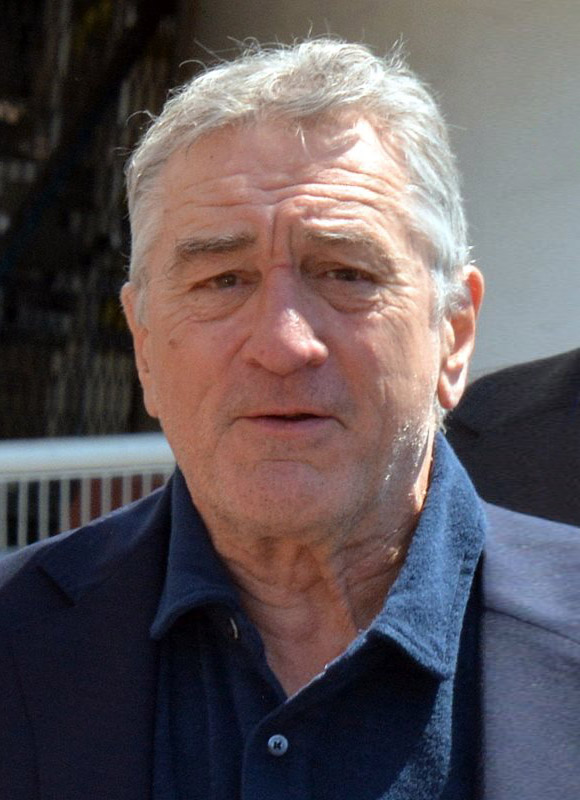
Robert De Niro

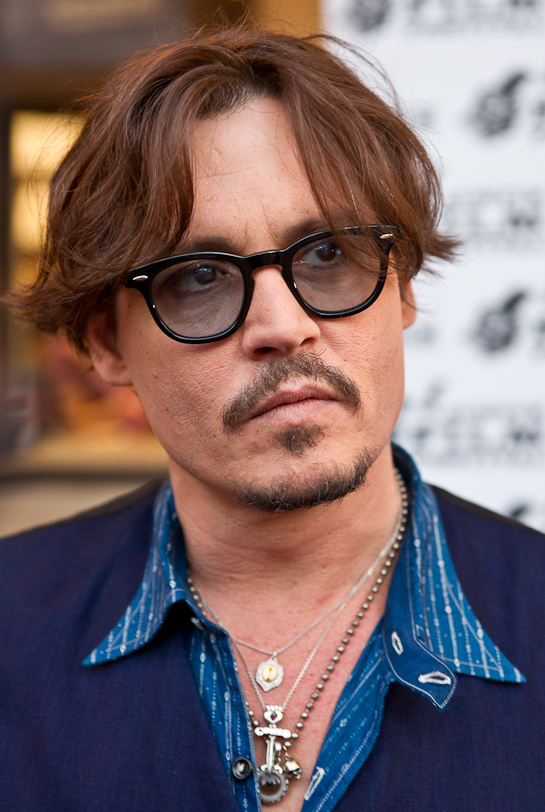
Johnny Depp

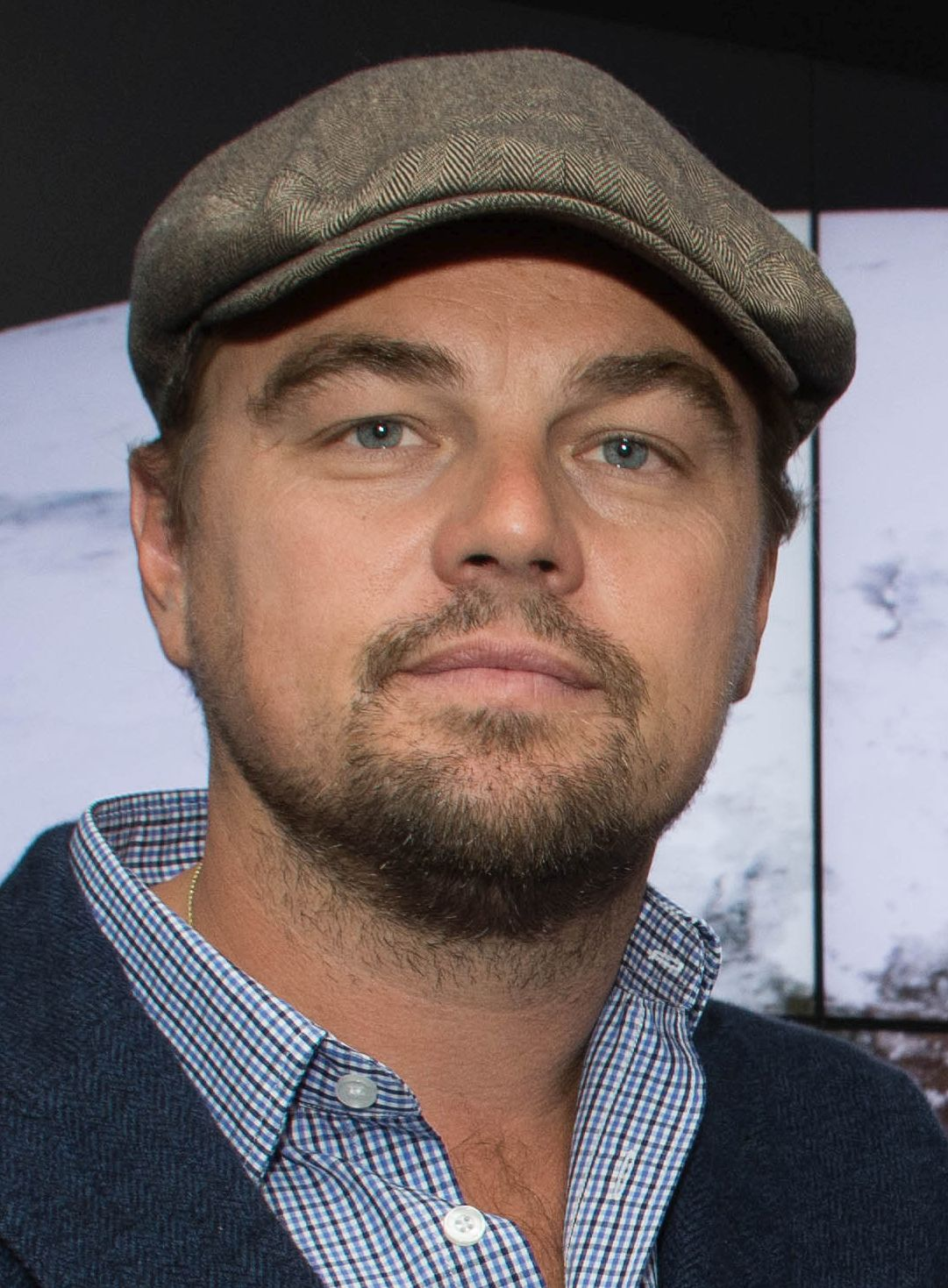
Leonardo DiCaprio

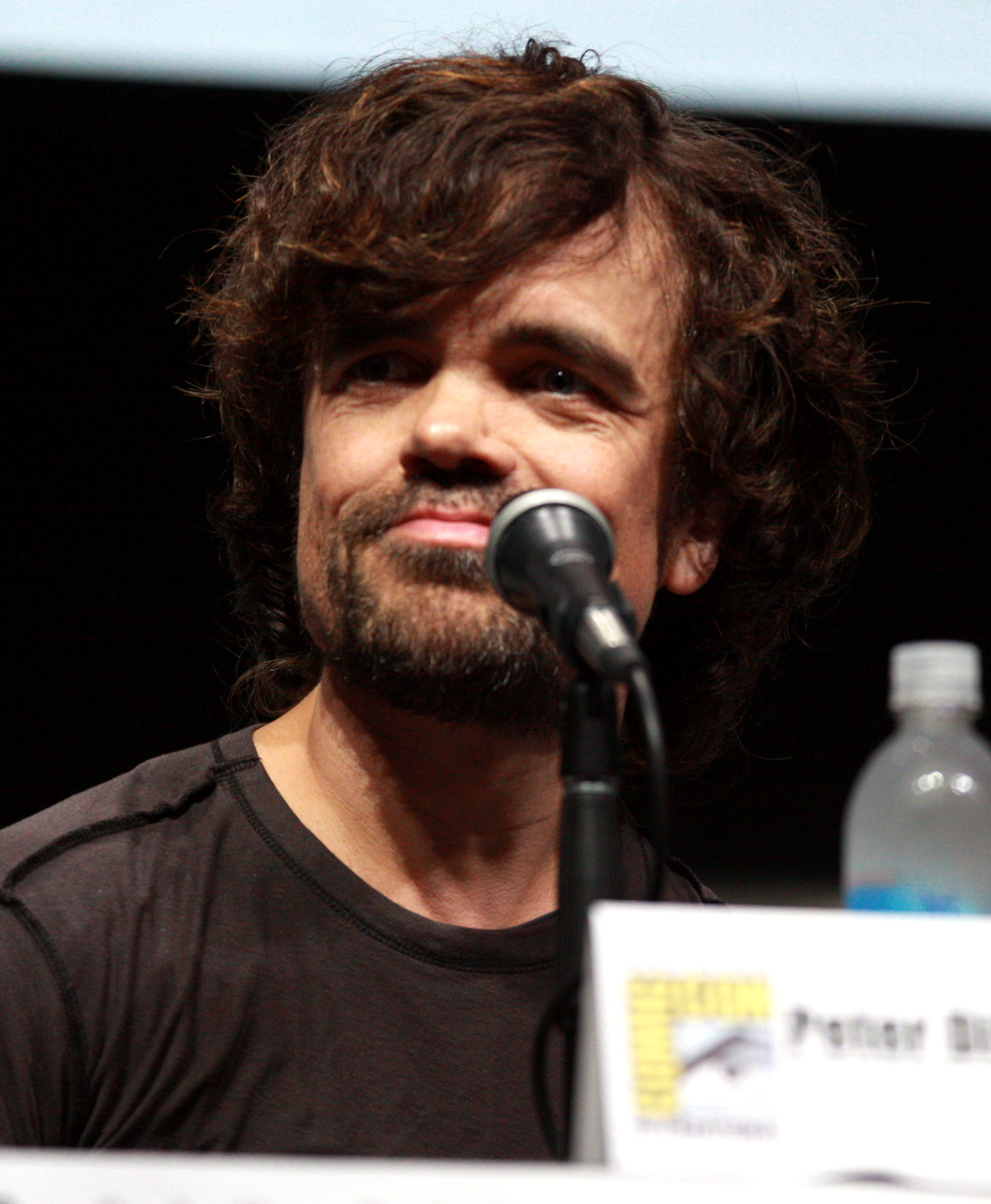
Peter Dinklage

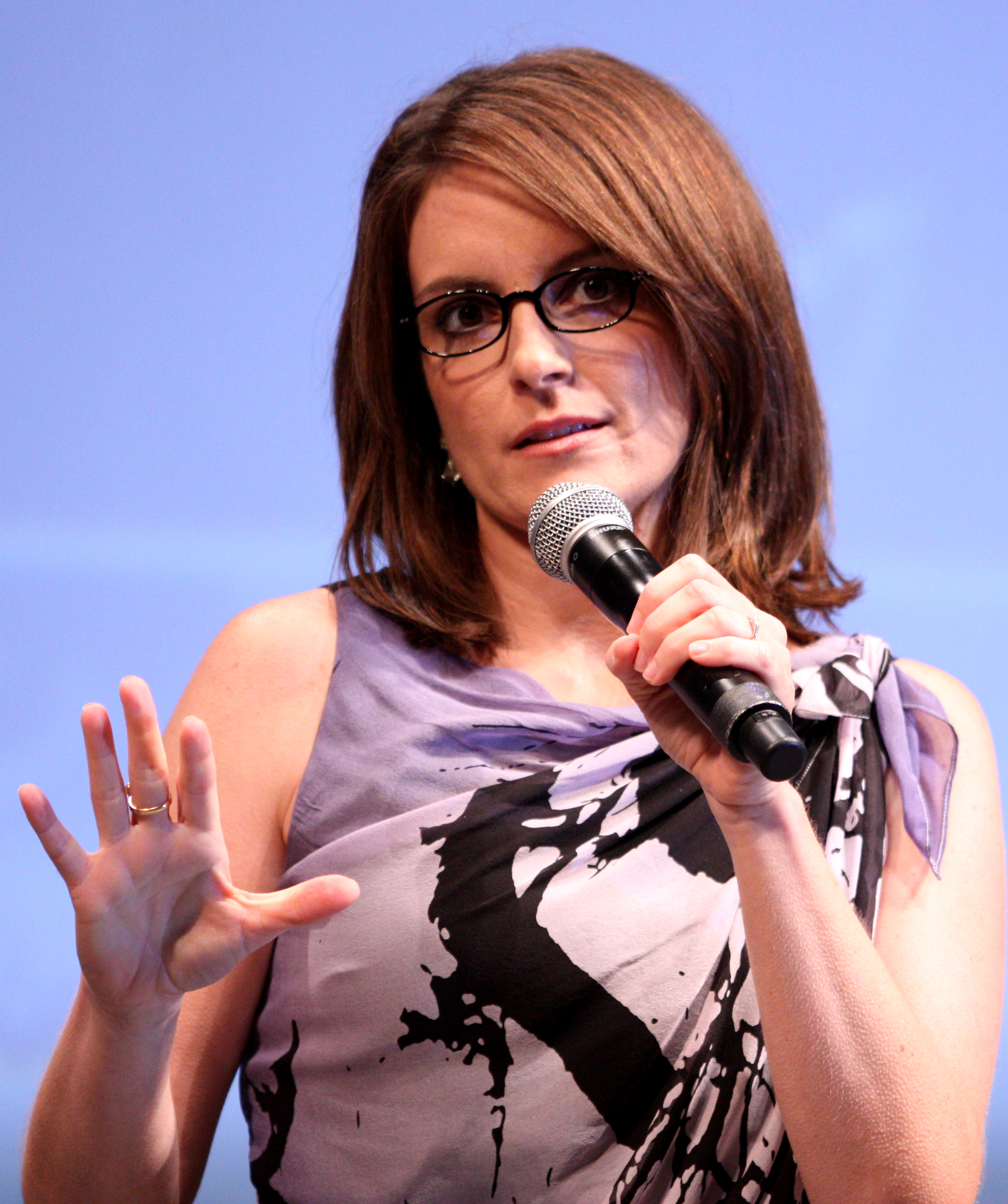
Tina Fey

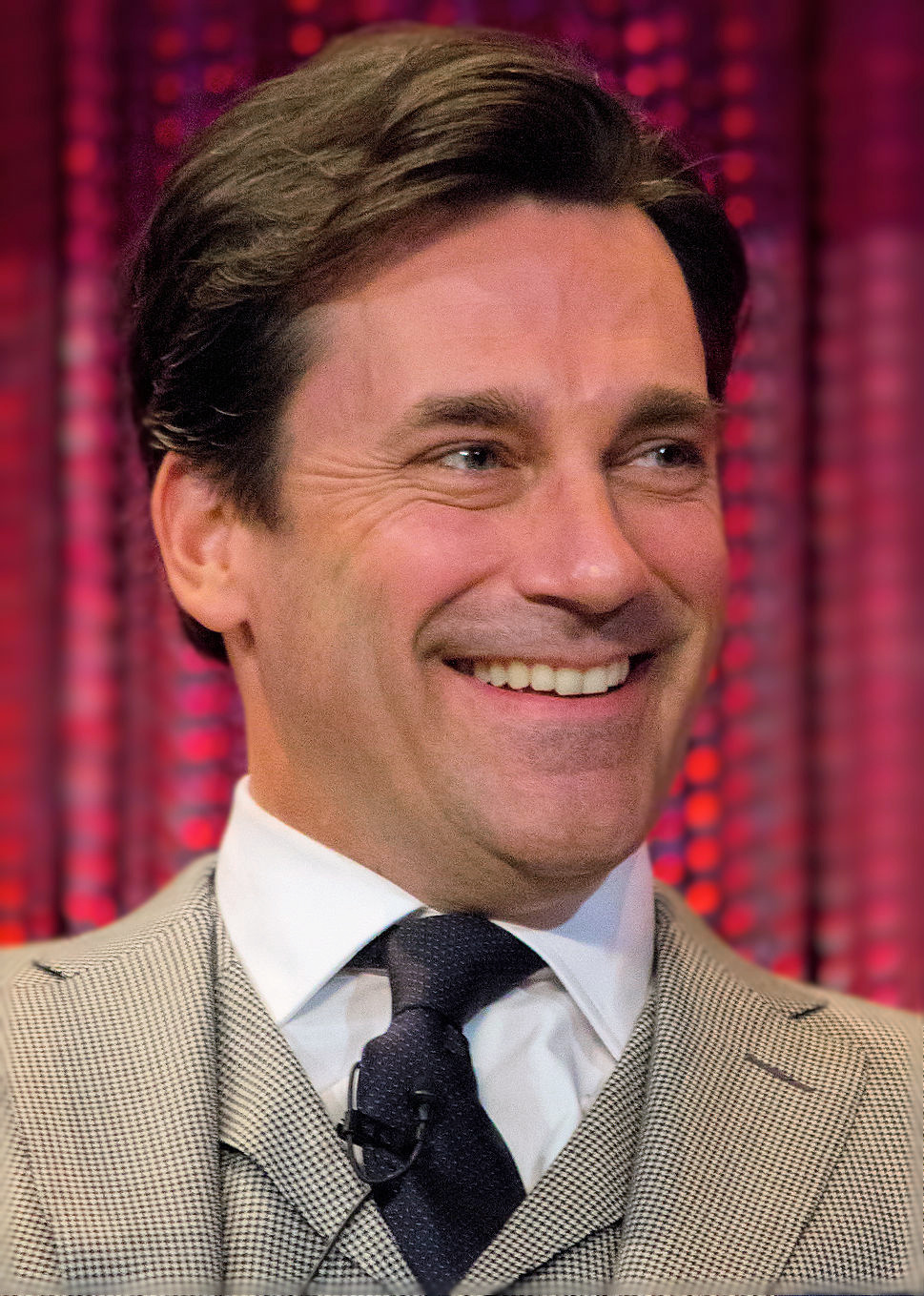
Jon Hamm

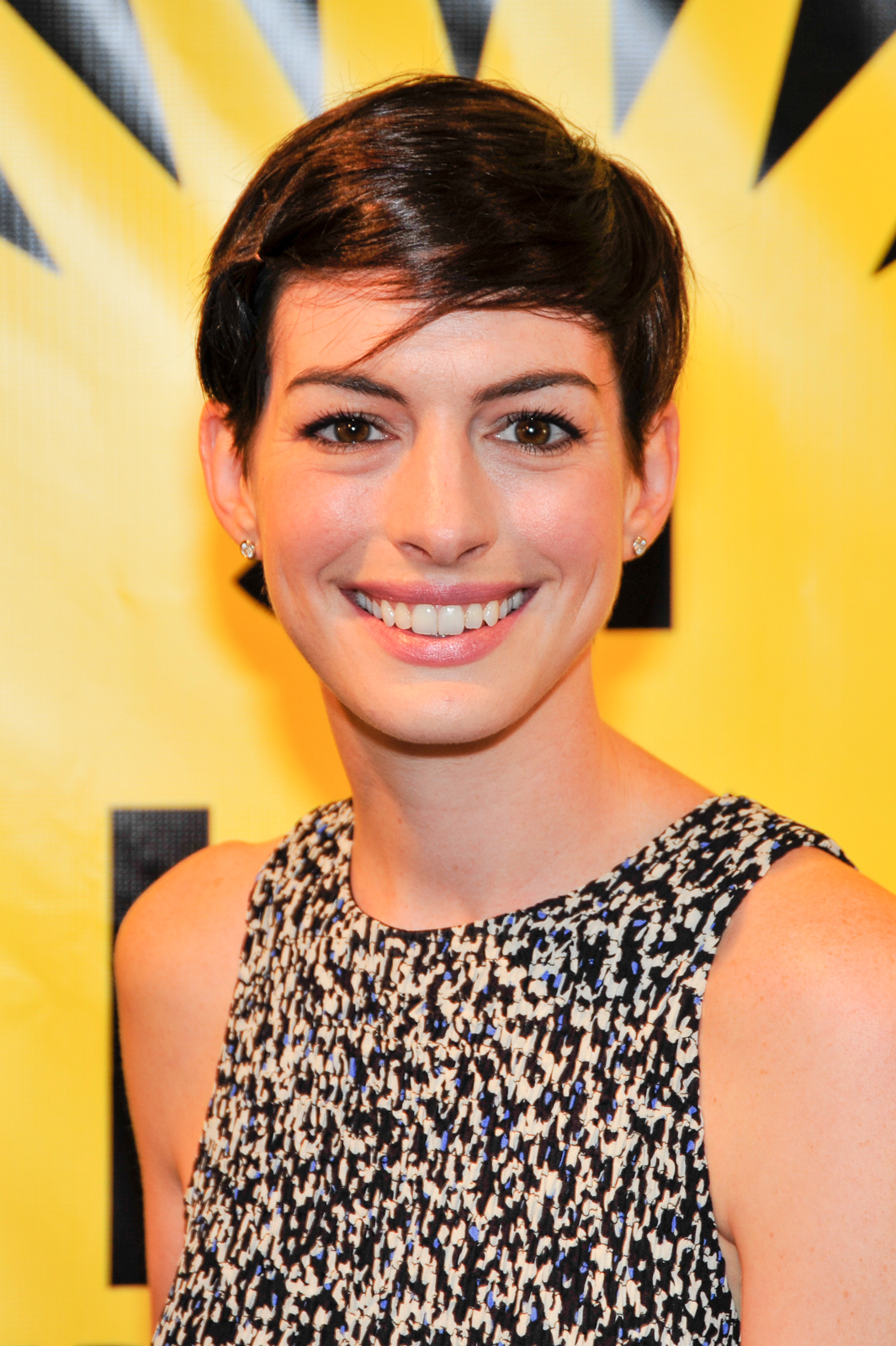
Anne Hathaway

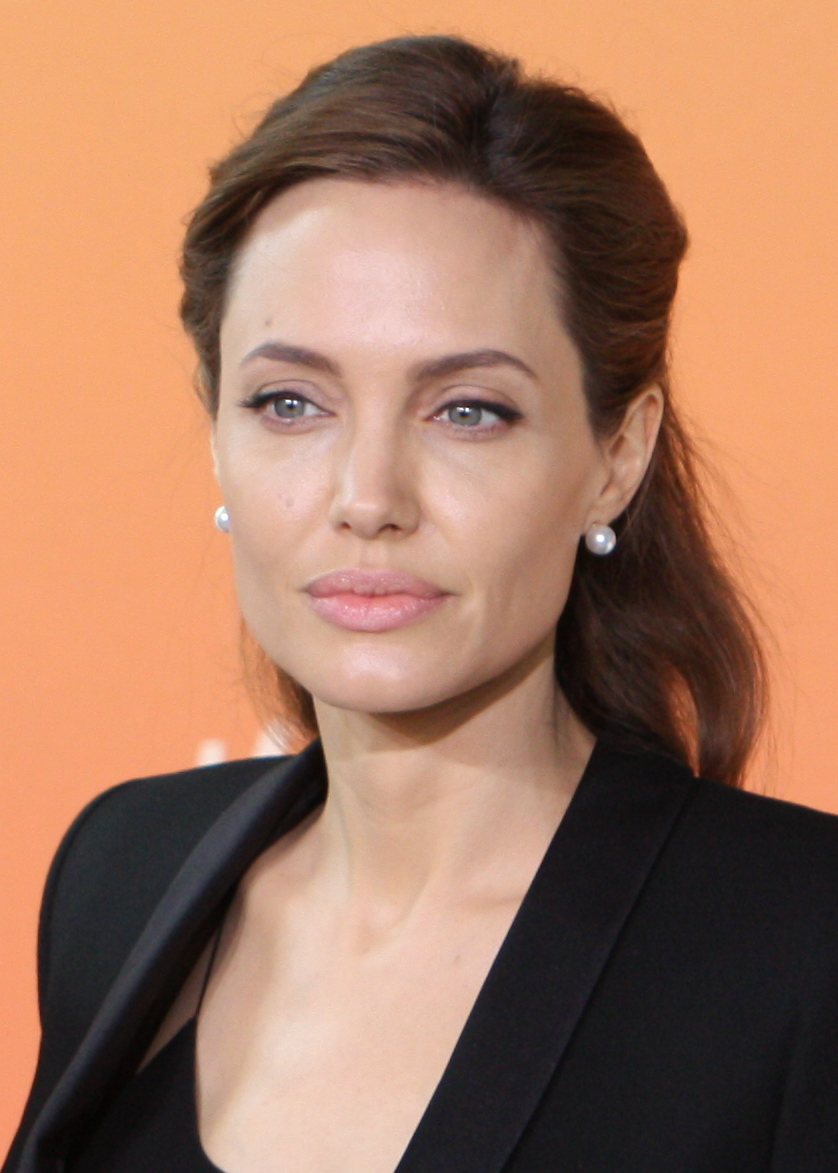
Angelina Jolie

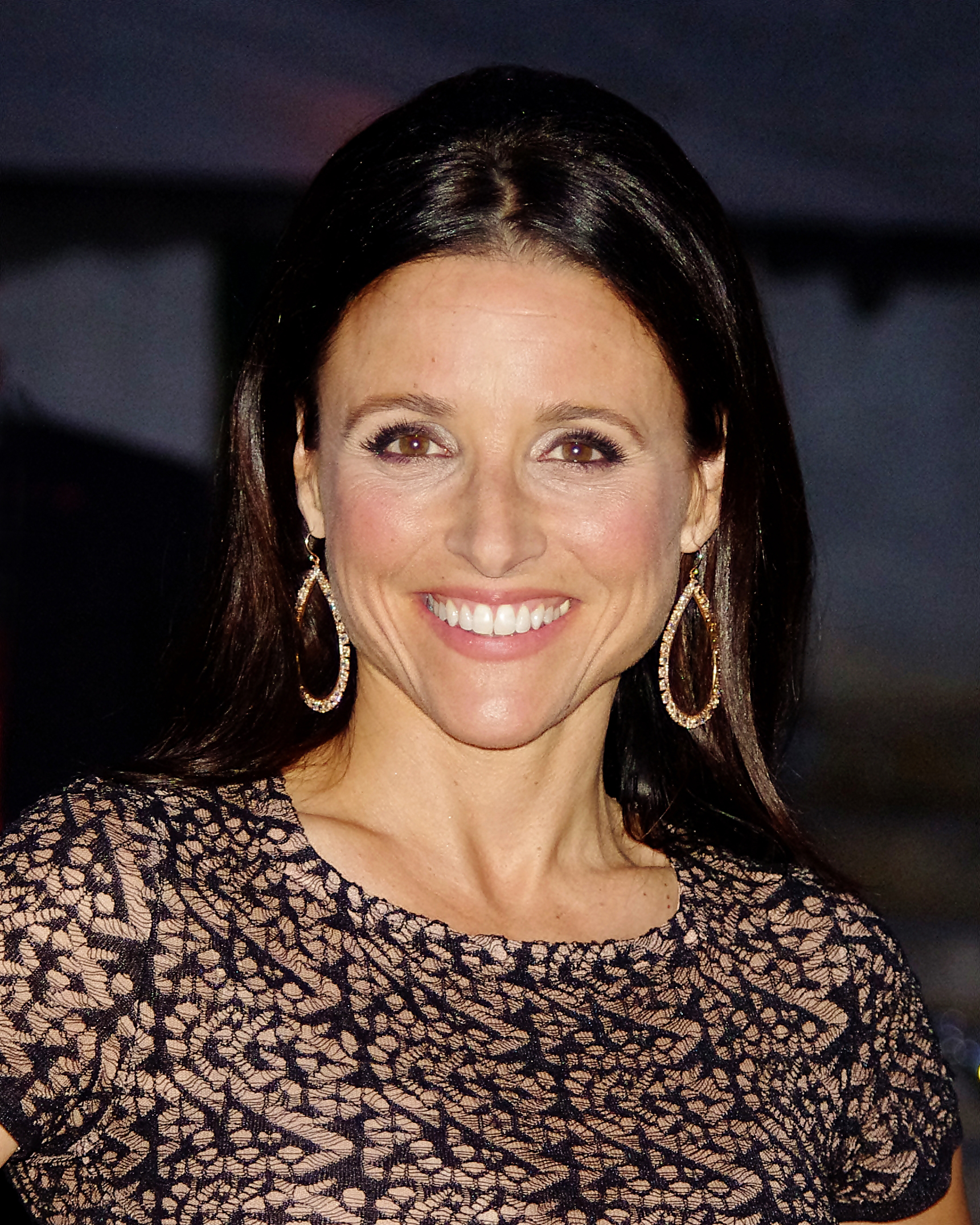
Julia Louis-Dreyfus

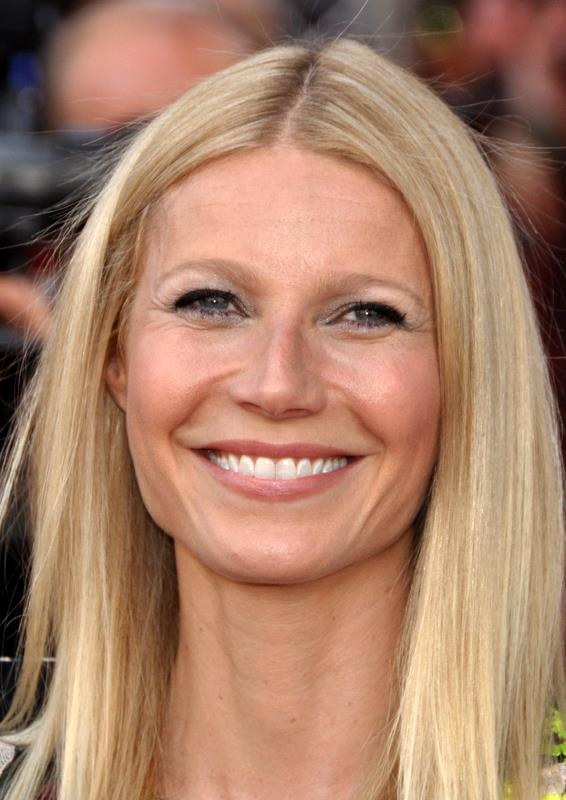
Gwyneth Paltrow

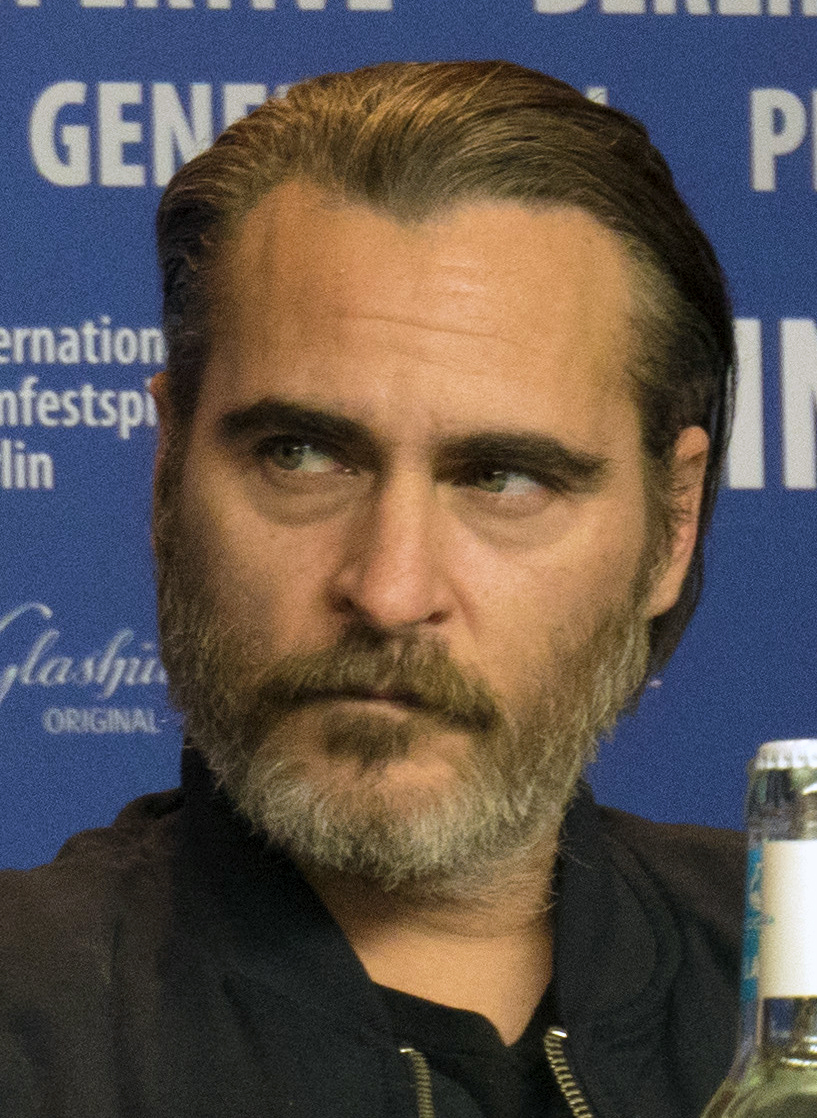
Joaquin Phoenix

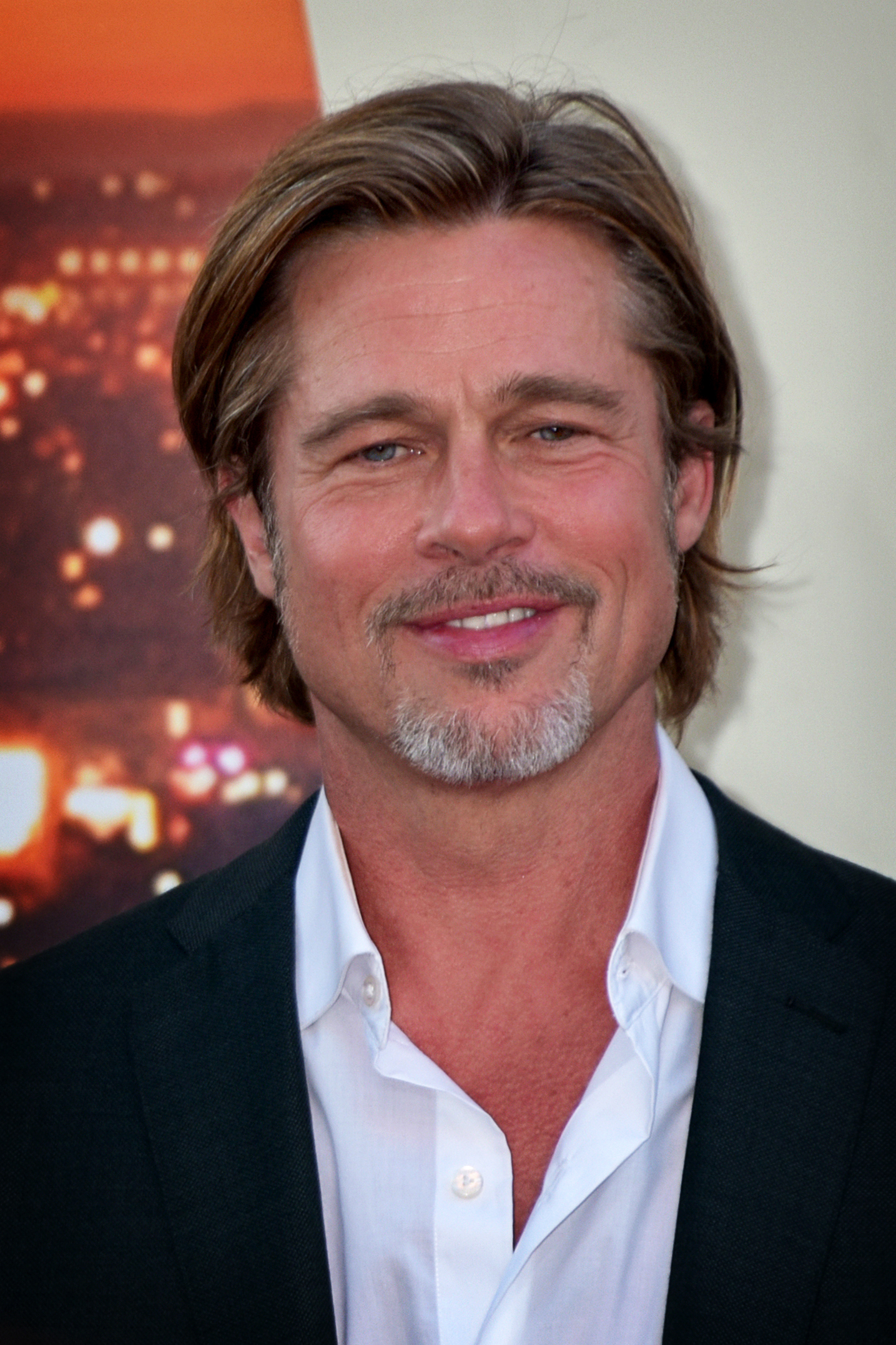
Brad Pitt

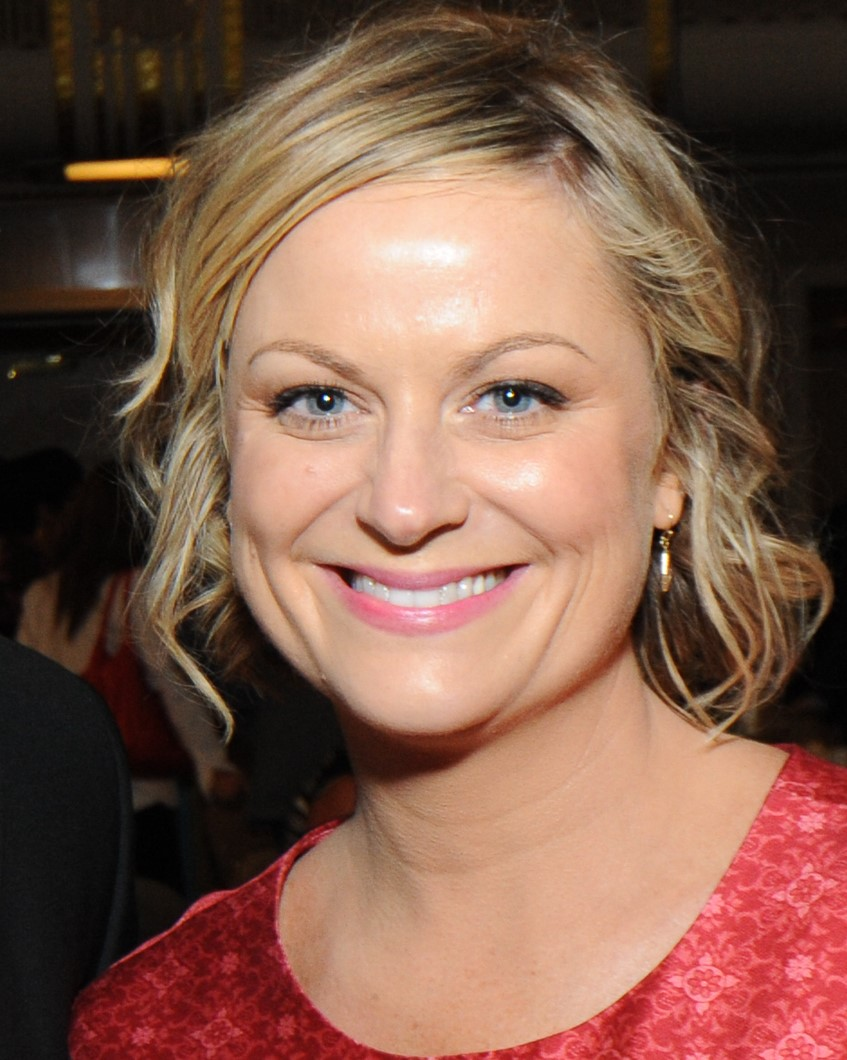
Amy Poehler

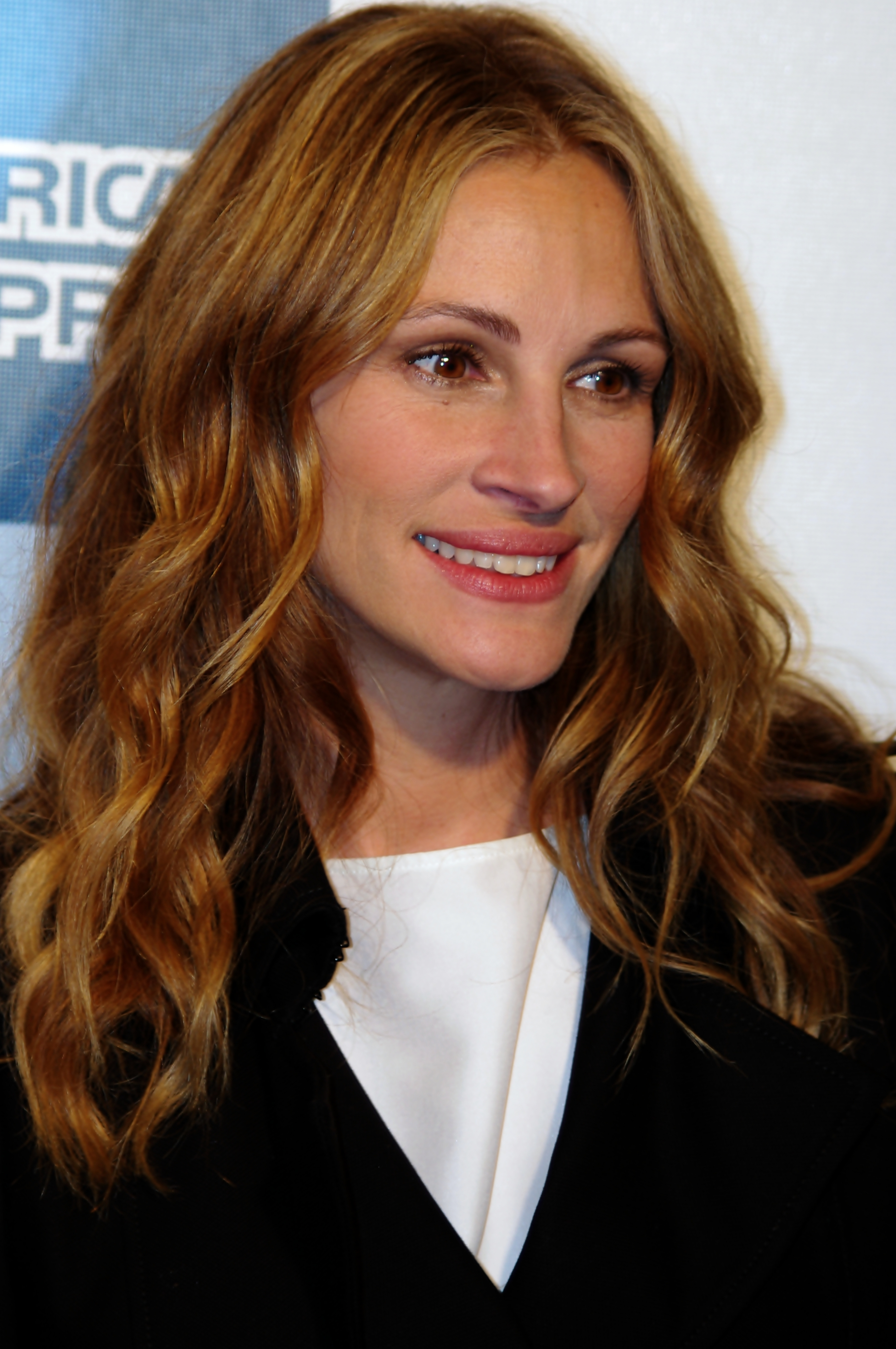
Julia Roberts

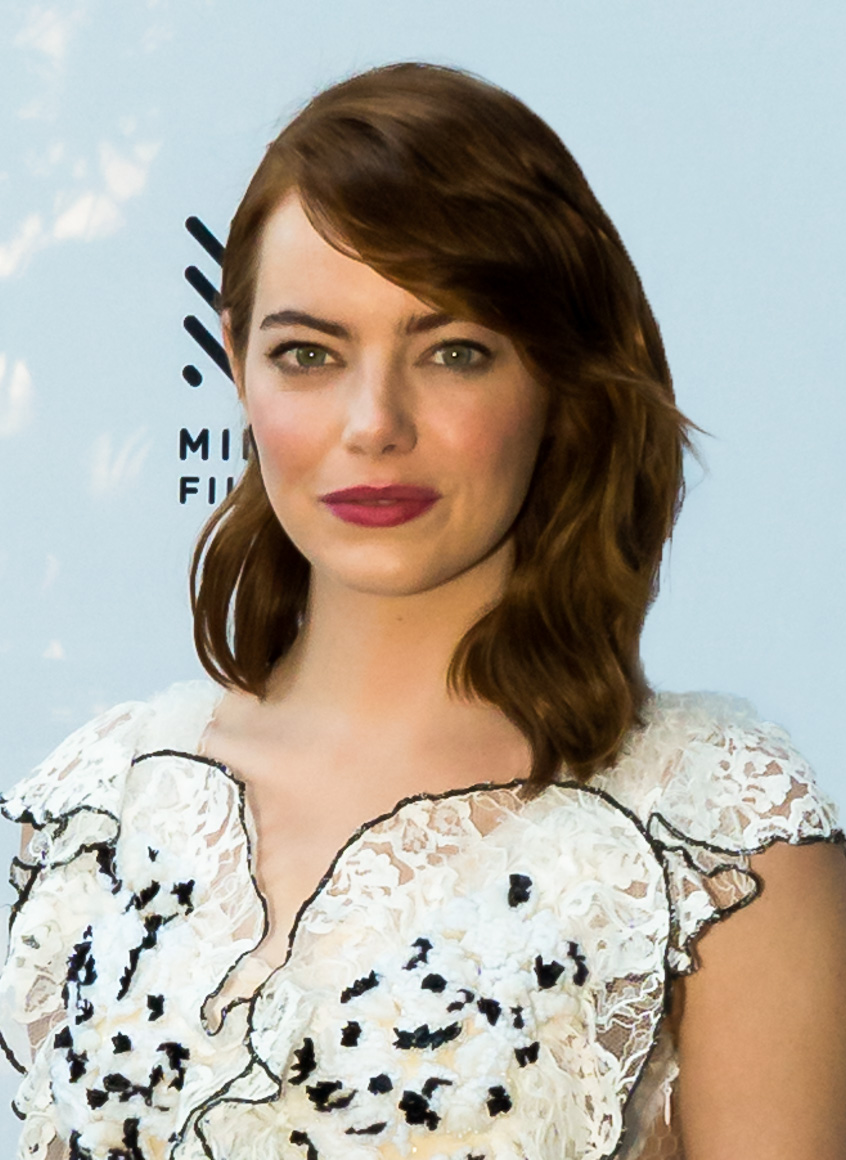
Emma Stone

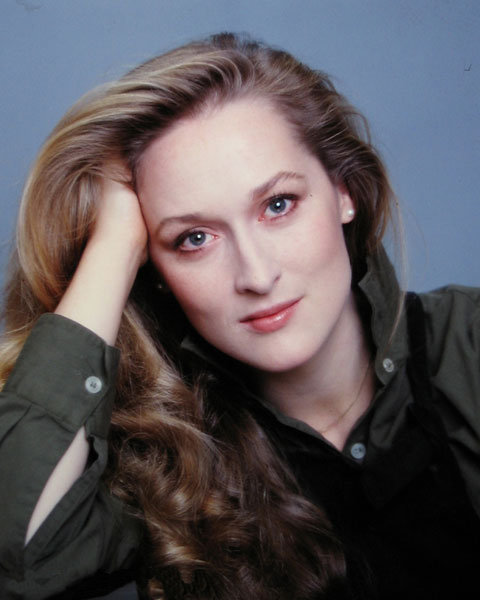
Meryl Streep

- Mika Abdalla – actress
- Gideon Adlon – actress
- Ben Affleck – actor and filmmaker
- Casey Affleck – actor and director
- Eddie Albert (born Edward Albert Heimberger) – stage, film, and character actor, and World War II hero
- Woody Allen (born Allan Stewart Konigsberg) – filmmaker, writer, actor, comedian, and musician
- Mädchen Amick – actress
- Fred Armisen – comedian, actor, musician, writer, and producer
- Fred Astaire – dancer, singer, actor, choreographer, and television presenter
- Odessa A'zion – actress
- Catherine Bach – actress
- Diedrich Bader – actor
- Haley Bennett – actress
- Earl W. Bascom – film actor
- Kim Basinger – actress
- Kristen Bell – actress
- Zazie Beetz – actress
- Candice Bergen – actress
- Frances Bergen (née Westerman) – actress and model
- Ingrid Bergman – actress
- Michael Biehn – actor
- Jessica Biel – actress
- Karen Black – actress
- Curt Bois – actor
- Johnny Yong Bosch – actor
- Julie Bowen – actress
- Eric Braeden – actor
- Marlon Brando – actor
- Lesley-Ann Brandt - actress
- Benjamin Bratt – actor
- Hermann Braun – actor
- Felix Bressart – actor
- Agnes Bruckner – actress
- Sandra Bullock – actress
- Ty Burrell – actor
- Scott Caan – actor
- Nicolas Cage – actor
- Steve Carell - actor
- Dana Carvey – actor, comedian, and producer
- Loan Chabanol – actress
- Sarah Chalke – actress
- Carol Channing – actor
- Claudia Christian – actress
- Mae Clarke (born Violet Mary Klotz) – actress
- Montgomery Clift – actor
- George Clooney – actor, director, producer, screenwriter, activist, businessman, and philanthropist
- Kevin Costner – actor
- Bryan Cranston – actor, director and producer
- Tom Cruise – actor
- Willem Dafoe – actor
- Josh Dallas – actor
- Helmut Dantine – actor
- Doris Day (born Doris Mary Anne Kappelhoff) – actress, singer
- Robert De Niro – actor
- James Dean – actor
- Johnny Depp – actor
- Cameron Diaz – actress
- Leonardo DiCaprio – actor
- Angie Dickinson – actress
- Marlene Dietrich – actress
- Peter Dinklage – actor
- Adam Driver – actor
- Patty Duke – actress; mother of Mackenzie Astin and Sean Astin
- Kirsten Dunst – film actress and former model
- Aaron Eckhart – actor
- Zac Efron – actor
- Nicole Eggert – actress
- Erika Eleniak – actress
- Noah Emmerich – actor
- Chris Evans – actor
- Dakota Fanning – actress
- Elle Fanning – actress; younger sister of Dakota Fanning
- Tina Fey – writer, comedian, and actress
- William Fichtner – actor
- Mark Fischbach - (Markiplier), YouTuber and actor
- Jenna Fischer – actress
- Carrie Fisher – actress
- Jodie Foster – actress
- James Franciscus —actor
- Jason David Frank (1973–2022) – actor and martial artist
- Dennis Franz (born Dennis Franz Schlachta) – actor
- Brendan Fraser – actor
- Tatiana von Fürstenberg – rock singer and filmmaker; daughter of fashion designers Diane and Prince Egon von Fürstenberg
- James Garner (born James Scott Bumgarner) – actor
- Clark Gable – actor
- Janet Gaynor – actress
- Lillian Gish – actress
- Summer Glau – actress
- Karl Glusman – actor
- Crispin Glover – actor
- Betty Grable – actress, dancer, and singer
- Joel Gretsch – actor
- Andy Griffith – actor
- Harry Groener – actor and dancer
- Lukas Haas – actor
- Gene Hackman – actor
- Thomas J. Hageboeck (1945–1996) – actor
- Uta Hagen – actress
- Jon Hamm – actor
- Chelsea Handler – comedian and actress
- Daryl Hannah – actress
- Melora Hardin – actress and singer
- Mariska Hargitay – actress
- Woody Harrelson – actor
- Cecilia Hart – television and stage actress
- David Hasselhoff – actor
- Anne Hathaway – actress
- Cole Hauser – film and television actor
- Dwight Hauser – actor and film producer
- Wings Hauser – actor, director and film writer
- James Haven – actor
- Rita Hayworth – actress and dancer
- Bill Heck – actor
- Eileen Heckart – actress
- Katherine Heigl – actress
- Tricia Helfer – actress
- Marg Helgenberger – actress
- Richard Henzel – film, TV, and voice-over actor
- Edward Herrmann – television and film actor
- J. G. Hertzler – actor, author, and screenwriter
- Emile Hirsch – actor
- Amélie Hoeferle – actress
- Katie Holmes – actress
- Sofia Hublitz – actress
- Adam Huber – actor
- Rock Hudson – actor
- Tab Hunter – film actor and singer
- Damian Hurley - actor
- Josh Hutcherson – actor
- Martha Hyer – Academy Award-nominated actress
- Gillian Jacobs – film, theater and television actress
- Emil Jannings – first actor to receive the Academy Award for Best Actor
- Van Johnson – film and television actor and dancer who was a major star at Metro-Goldwyn-Mayer studios during and after World War II
- Angelina Jolie (born Angelina Jolie Voight) – actress
- Leatrice Joy (born Leatrice Joy Zeidler) – silent film era actress
- Victoria Justice – actress
- Vincent Kartheiser – actor
- Gene Kelly – dancer, actor, singer, director and choreographer
- Grace Kelly – actress
- Ellie Kemper – actress and comedian
- Nicole Kidman – actress
- Richard Kiel – actor
- Joey King – actress
- Q'orianka Kilcher – actress and singer
- Val Kilmer – actor
- Angela Kinsey – actress
- Chris Klein – actor
- Werner Klemperer – actor
- Kevin Kline – actor
- Liza Koshy – actress, television host, comedian, media personality, and YouTuber
- Don Knotts – actor and comedian
- Johnny Knoxville – actor
- Boris Kodjoe – actor
- David Koechner – actor, comedian, and musician
- Lynne Koplitz – actor and comedian
- Fran Kranz – actor
- Kurt Kreuger – actor
- Diane Kruger – actress
- Mickey Kuhn – actor
- Ashton Kutcher – actor
- Cheryl Ladd – actress and model
- Veronica Lake – actress and pin-up model
- Jessica Lange – actress
- Wesley Lau – film and television actor
- Cyndi Lauper – singer, actress
- Ed Lauter – actor
- Taylor Lautner – actor/martial artist
- Jennifer Lawrence – actress
- Bruce Lee – actor; father of Brandon Lee and Shannon Lee
- Janine Lindemulder – exotic dancer and adult film actress
- Kay Lenz – actress
- Clara Lipman – actress and playwright; sister of Lieder singer Mattie Lipman Marum
- Blake Lively – actress
- Kristanna Loken – actress
- Carole Lombard – actress
- Julia Louis-Dreyfus – actress
- Chad Lowe – actor and director
- Rob Lowe – actor
- Kellan Lutz – fashion model and actor for television and films
- Matilda Lutz – actress
- Chloé Lukasiak – actress and dancer
- Chloë Grace Moretz – actress
- Kaitlyn Maher – actress and singer
- John Malkovich – actor
- Jayne Mansfield – actress
- William Mapother – actor
- Marx Brothers – actors
- Matthew McConaughey – actor
- Mia Malkova – pornographic actress
- Candice Michelle – model, actress, WWE wrestler
- Wentworth Miller – actor
- Jason Momoa – actor
- Michelle Monaghan – actress
- Barbara Nichols – actress
- Jack Nicholson – actor and filmmaker
- Nick Nolte – actor
- Bob Odenkirk – actor
- Chris O'Donnell – actor
- Nick Offerman – actor and comedian
- Heather O'Rourke – child actress
- Chord Overstreet – actor
- Jared Padalecki – actor
- Lilli Palmer (born Lillie Marie Peiser) – actress
- Gwyneth Paltrow – actress; daughter of Blythe Danner
- Sarah Jessica Parker – actress
- Gregory Peck – actor
- Evan Peters – actor
- William Petersen – actor and producer
- Michelle Pfeiffer – actress
- Joaquin Phoenix – actor
- Brad Pitt – actor
- Amy Poehler – actress, comedian, producer and writer
- Erich Pommer – actor and film producer
- Ryan Potter - actor
- Chris Pratt – actor
- Laura Prepon – actress
- Freddie Prinze Jr. – actor
- Jürgen Prochnow – actor
- George Raft (born George Ranft) – actor
- Luise Rainer – actress
- John Ratzenberger – actor
- Donna Reed – actress
- Frank Reicher – German-born American actor, director and producer
- Lili Reinhart – actress
- Jeremy Renner – actor and musician
- Denise Richards – actress
- Molly Ringwald – actress
- Naya Rivera – actress and singer
- Julia Roberts – actress and producer
- Isabella Rossellini – actress, daughter of Ingrid Bergman
- Andrew Rothenberg – television actor
- Mercedes Ruehl – theater, television and film actor
- Sonya Smith – actress; her mother side is German decentdant
- Katee Sackhoff – actress
- William Sadler – film and television actor
- Roy Scheider – actor
- August Schellenberg – actor
- Kendall Schmidt – actor and singer – well known for his part in Big Time Rush
- Danielle Schneider – actress, comedian, and writer
- Helen Schneider – actress and singer
- John Schneider – actor and singer
- Liev Schreiber – actor
- Pablo Schreiber – actor
- Ricky Schroder – actor and film director
- Carly Schroeder – actress and model
- Brooke Shields – actress
- Tom Selleck – actor
- Amanda Seyfried – actress
- Sherri Saum – actress
- Elke Sommer – actress
- Josef Sommer – actor
- Shannyn Sossamon – actress, dancer, model, and musician
- Nick Stahl – actor
- Rod Steiger – actor
- Frances Sternhagen – actress
- Emma Stone – actress
- Michael Strahan – retired football player, actor, and television personality
- Meryl Streep – actress
- Ethan Stiefel – dancer, choreographer, and director
- Jeremy Sumpter – actor
- Sydney Sweeney – actress
- Carl Switzer – actor, professional dog breeder and hunting guide
- Ralph Taeger – actor
- Channing Tatum – actor
- Shirley Temple – actress
- Alexis Texas – pornographic actress
- Charlize Theron – actress
- Jonathan Taylor Thomas (born Jonathan Taylor Weiss) – actor
- Uma Thurman – actress; mother is model Nena von Schlebrügge
- Rip Torn – actor and voice actor
- Liv Tyler – actress
- Alida Valli (Maria Laura Altenburger von Marckenstein-Frauenberg) – actress
- Mario Van Peebles – actor and director
- Mike Vogel – actor
- Jon Voight – actor
- Erik von Detten – actor
- Jenna von Oÿ – actress and singer
- Christopher Walken – actor
- Paul Walker – actor
- Erin Wasson – actress and model
- Johnny Weissmuller – Olympic swimmer, actor, best known as Tarzan
- Lois Weber – silent film actress, screenwriter, producer, and director
- George Wendt – actor
- Frank Welker – actor
- Malina Weissman – actress
- Mae West – actress, playwright, screenwriter, and sex symbol
- Vera-Ellen Westmeier Rohe – actress and dancer
- Bruce Willis – actor
- Henry Winkler – actor, comedian, director, producer, and author
- Frank Wolff – actor
- Elijah Wood – actor
- Kari Wuhrer – actress and singer
- Elizabeth Yu – actress
- Wolfgang Zilzer – actor
- Mackenzie Ziegler – singer, actress and dancer
- Maddie Ziegler – actress and dancer
- Zendaya – (born Zendaya Maree Stoermer Coleman) actress

=== Celebrities ===
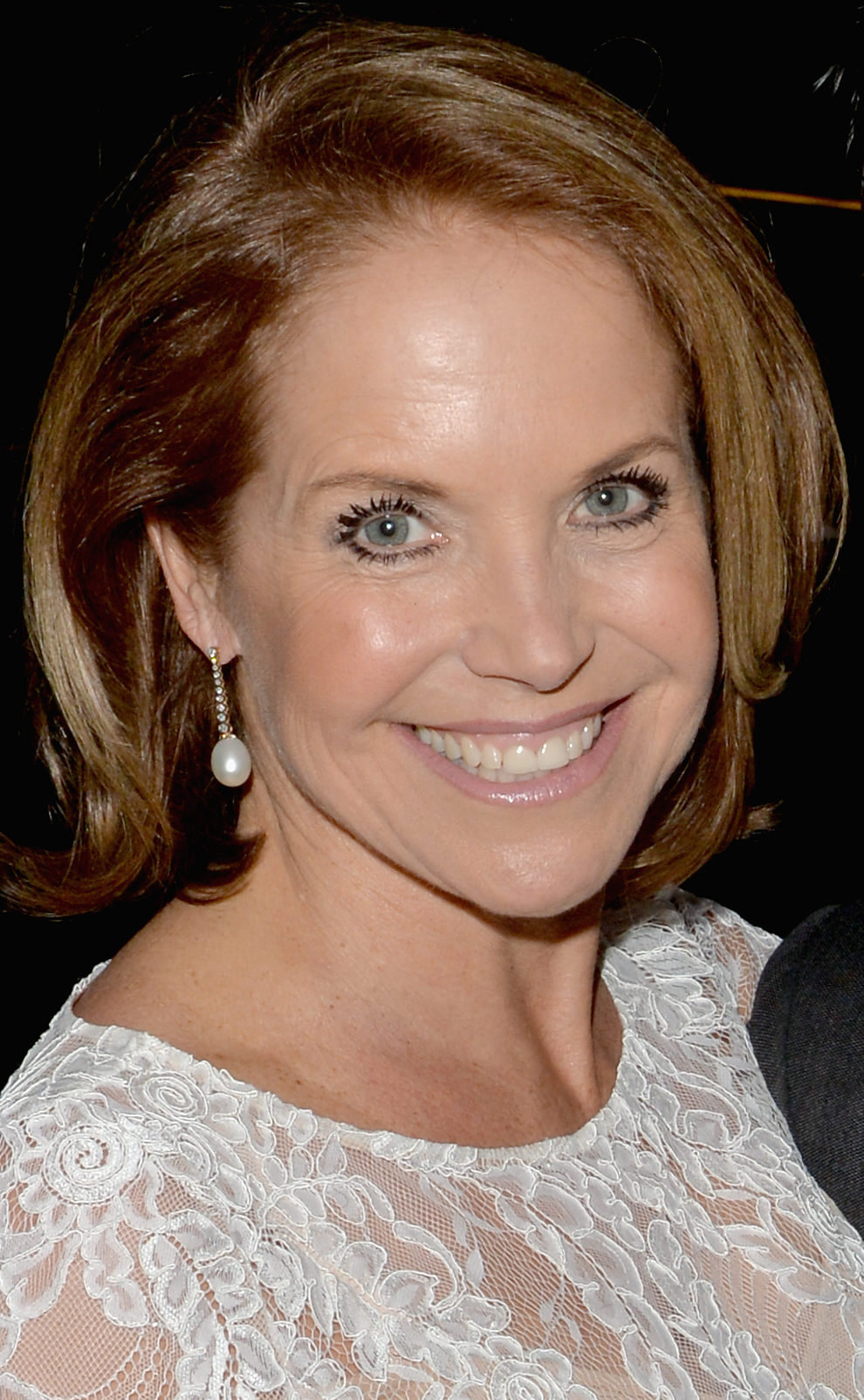
Katie Couric

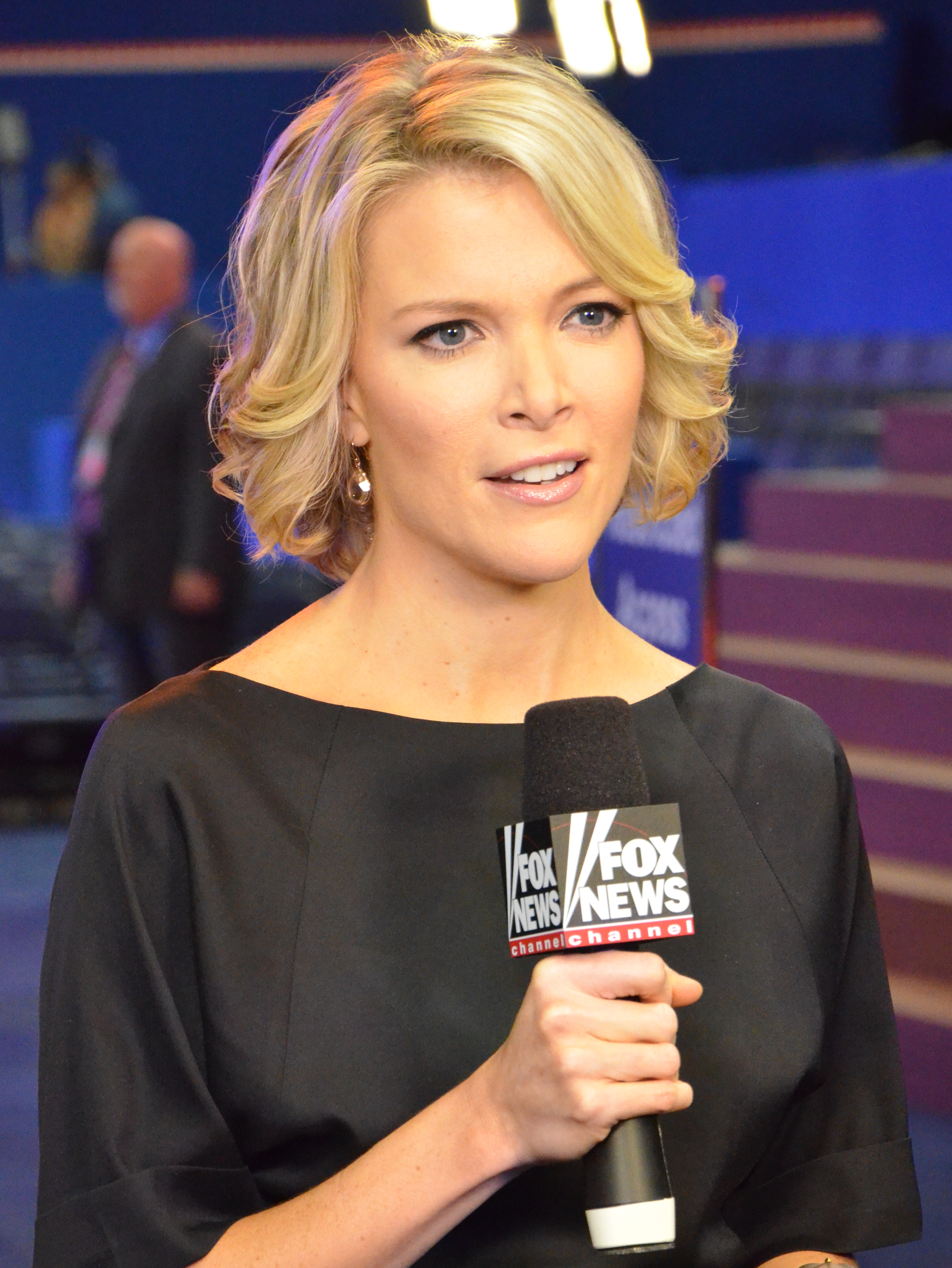
Megyn Kelly

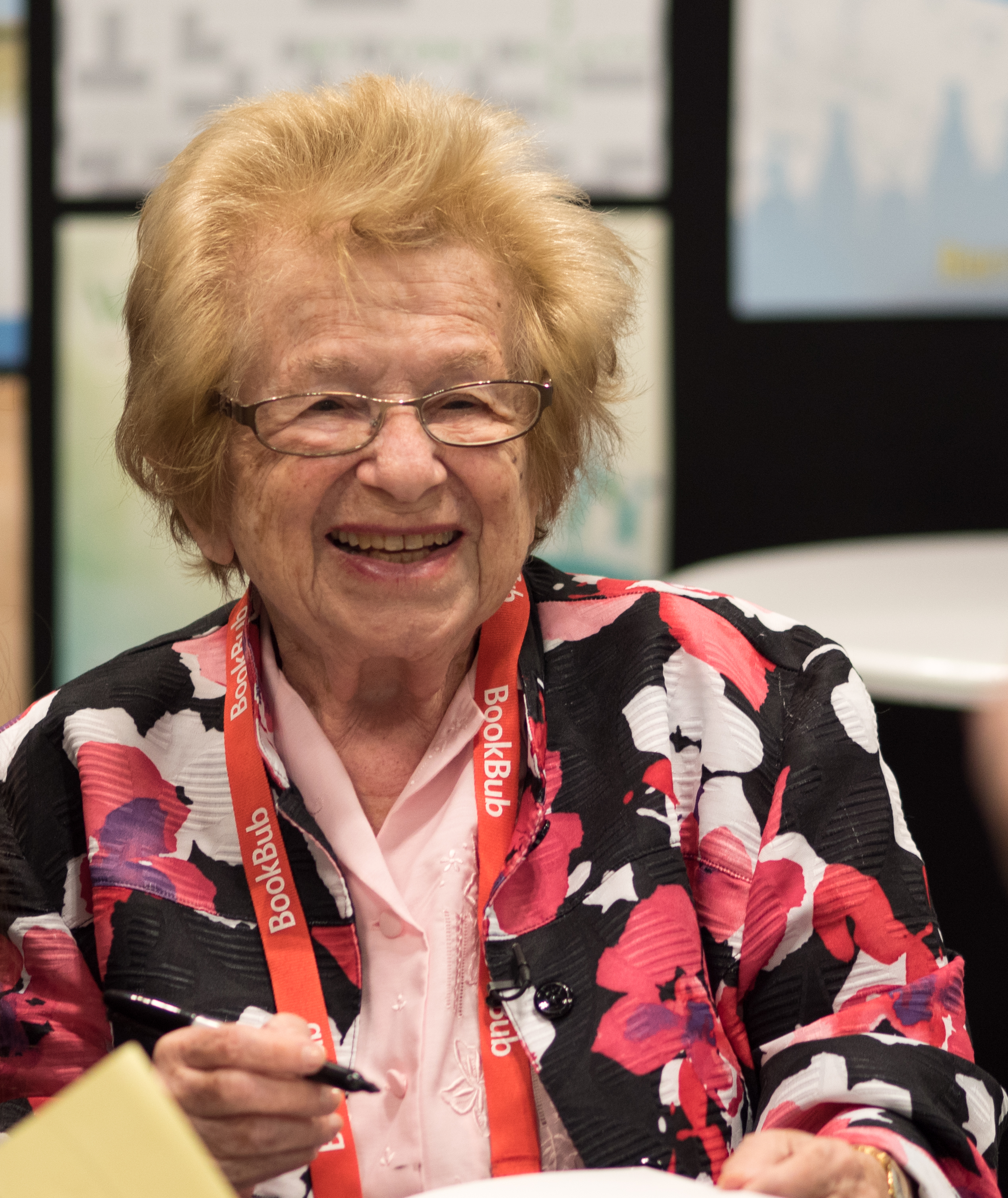
Ruth Westheimer

- Glenn Beck – political commentator
- Benjamin C. Bradlee (1921–2014) – editor-in-chief of the Washington Post during the Watergate scandal
- Samantha Brown (born 1970) – television host of several Travel Channel programs
- Pat Buchanan – political commentator
- William F. Buckley Jr. – conservative writer and political commentator, founder of National Review
- Kristin Cavallari – television personality, fashion designer, and actress
- Katie Couric – television and online journalist, presenter, producer, and author
- Walter Cronkite – broadcast journalist, best known as anchorman for the CBS Evening News for 19 years (1962–1981)
- Jeane Dixon – born Lydia Emma Pinckert, astrologer and self-proclaimed psychic, columnist
- Mark Edward Fischbach – YouTuber and actor
- Siegfried Fischbacher – magician
- Willie Geist – television personality, journalist and humorist
- Nicky Hilton – businesswoman, socialite, model, member of the former Hilton Hotel owners family
- Paris Hilton – businesswoman, socialite, model, member of the former Hilton Hotel owners family
- James Holzhauer (born 1984) – game show contestant and professional sports gambler
- Roy Horn – magician
- Kris Jenner – socialite
- Kendall Jenner – socialite and model
- Kylie Jenner – socialite, model, media personality, businesswoman, and billionaire from Kylie Cosmetics
- Alex Jones – conspiracy theorist
- Khloe Kardashian – socialite and model
- Kourtney Kardashian – socialite and model
- Kim Kardashian – television personality, socialite, actress, businesswoman, and model
- Megyn Kelly – journalist, attorney, talk show host
- Jimmy Kimmel – comedian, writer, late night talk show host, game show host, and producer
- Tomi Lahren – political commentator
- Rush Limbaugh – conservative political commentator
- Alicia Menendez – television journalist
- Bridget Marquardt – model and TV personality, reality TV star
- Jenny McCarthy – model, author, activist, actress, Playboy Playmate of the Year, and television personality
- Don Ohlmeyer – TV producer and president of the NBC West Coast
- Keith Olbermann – news anchor, sports and political commentator, and radio sportscaster
- Jeff Probst – game show host and executive producer
- Brad Rutter – game show contestant, TV host, producer, and actor
- Judy Sheindlin – television personality, television producer, author, former prosecutor and family court judge
- Stassi Schroeder – television personality, podcast host, author, fashion blogger, and model
- Ed Schultz – television and radio host, liberal political commentator, former sports broadcaster
- Jerry Springer – television personality, journalist, comedian
- Ruth Westheimer (born 1928) – known as "Dr. Ruth," sex therapist, talk show host, author, professor, Holocaust survivor, and former Haganah sniper

=== Composers and musicians ===
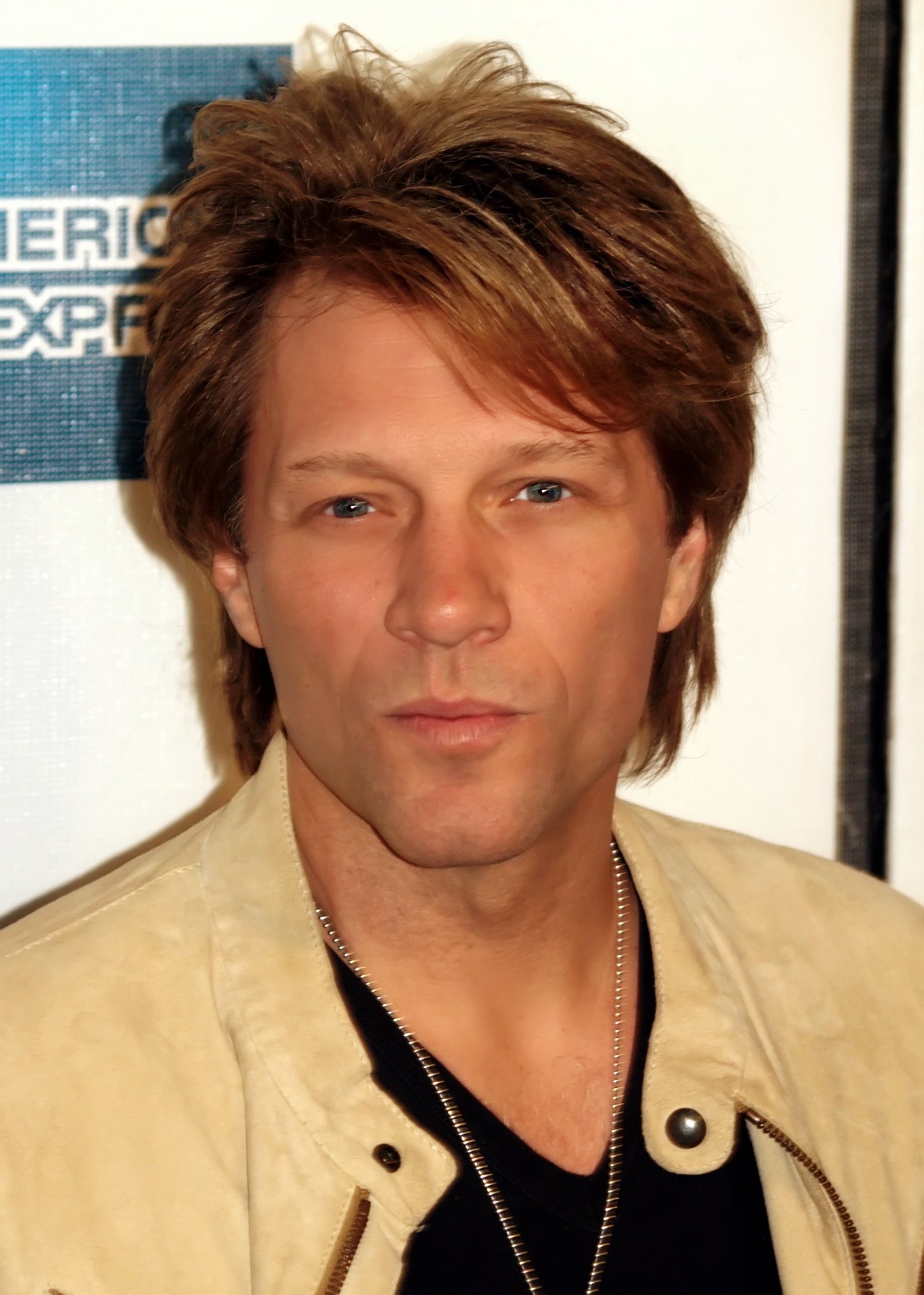
Jon Bon Jovi

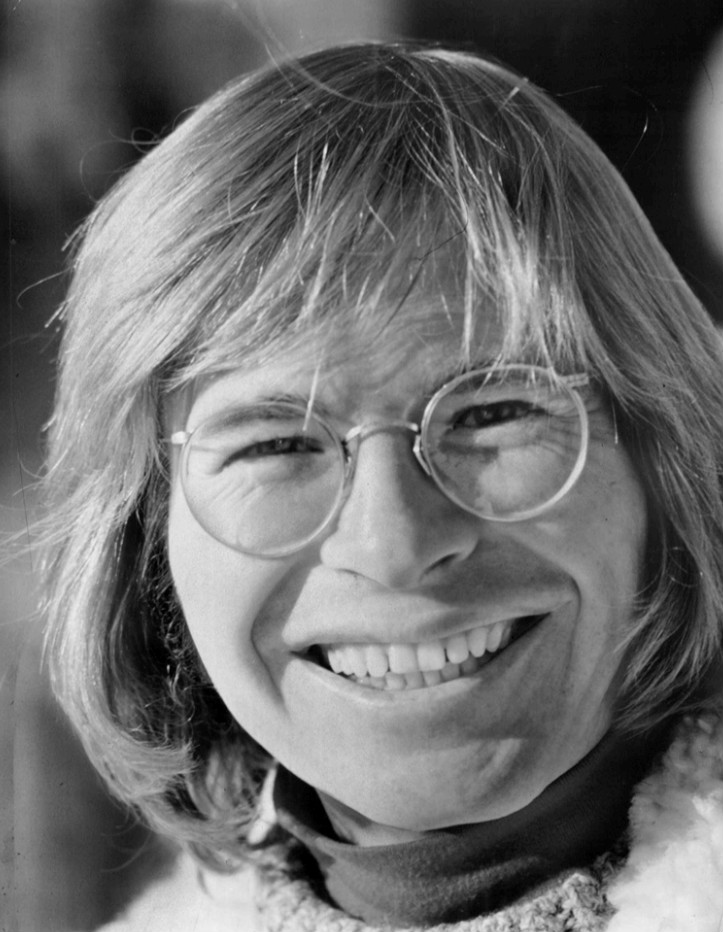
John Denver

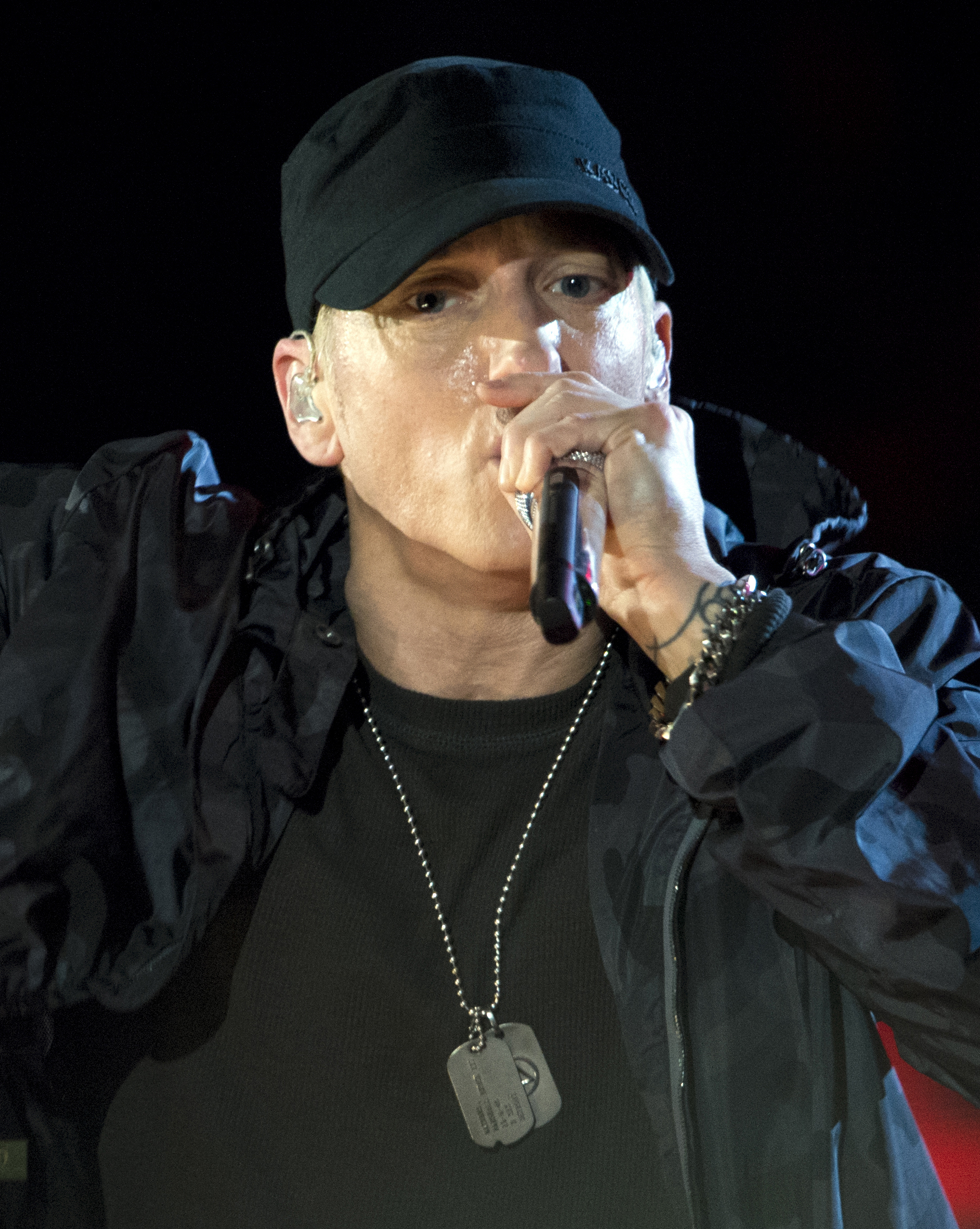
Eminem

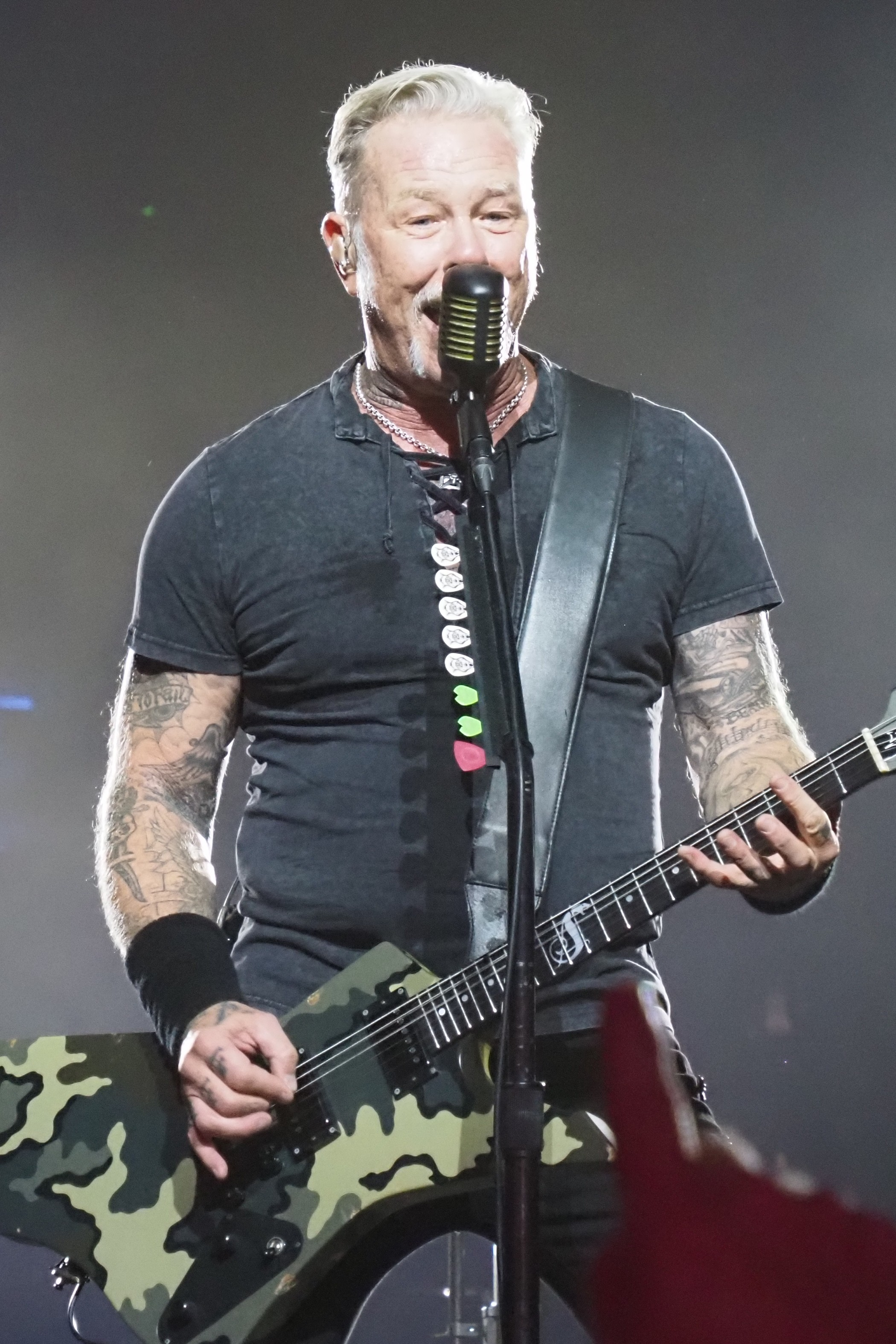
James Hetfield

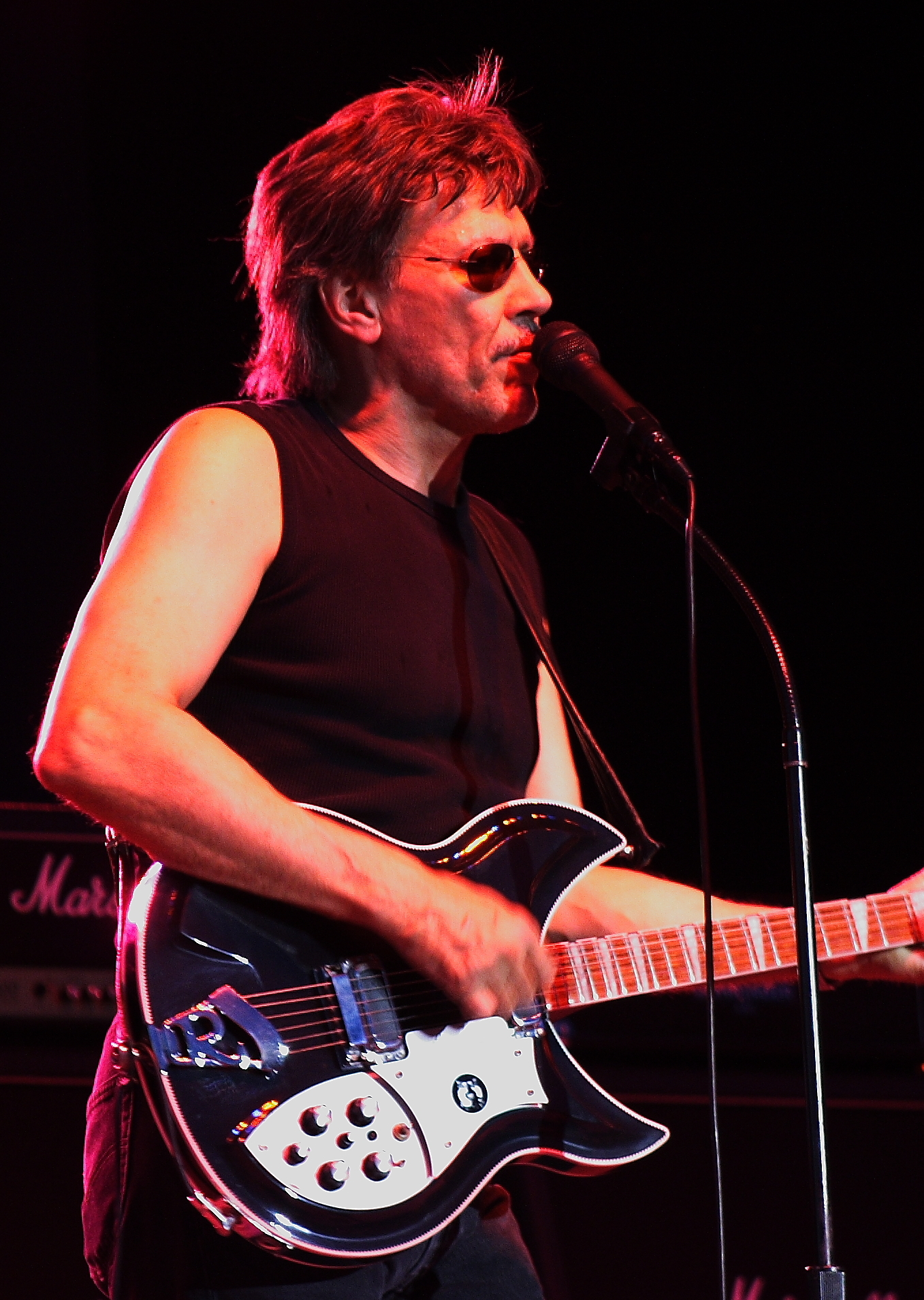
John Kay

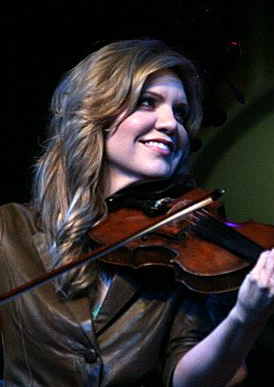
Alison Krauss

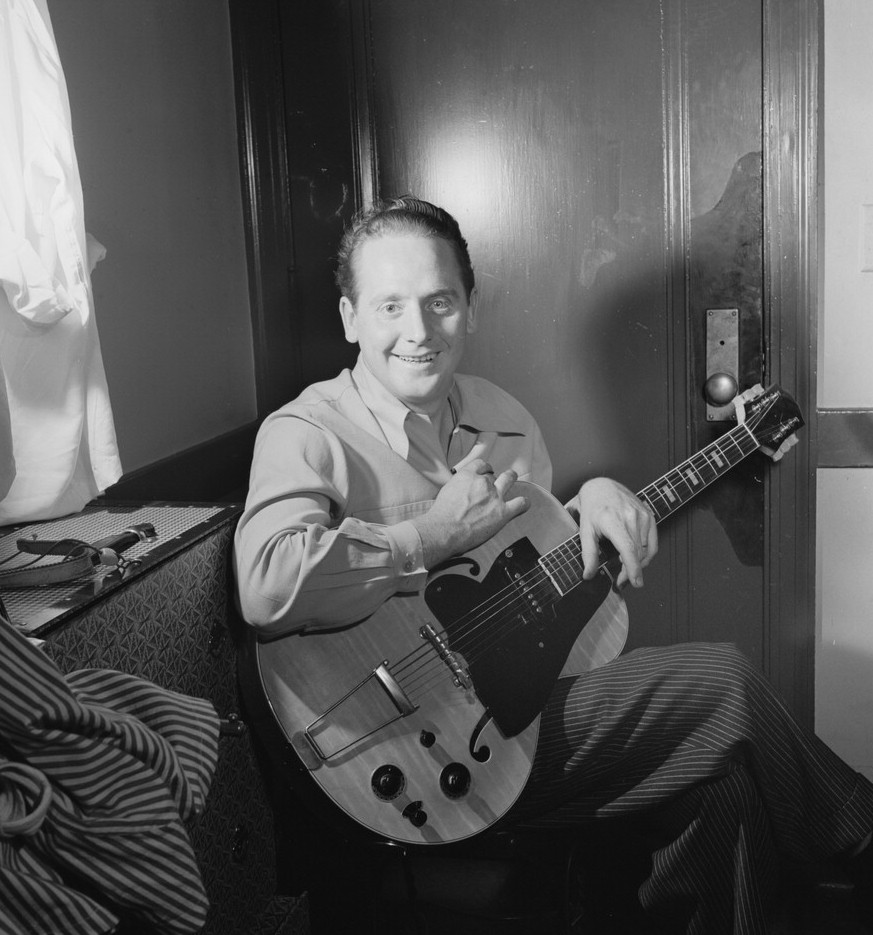
Les Paul

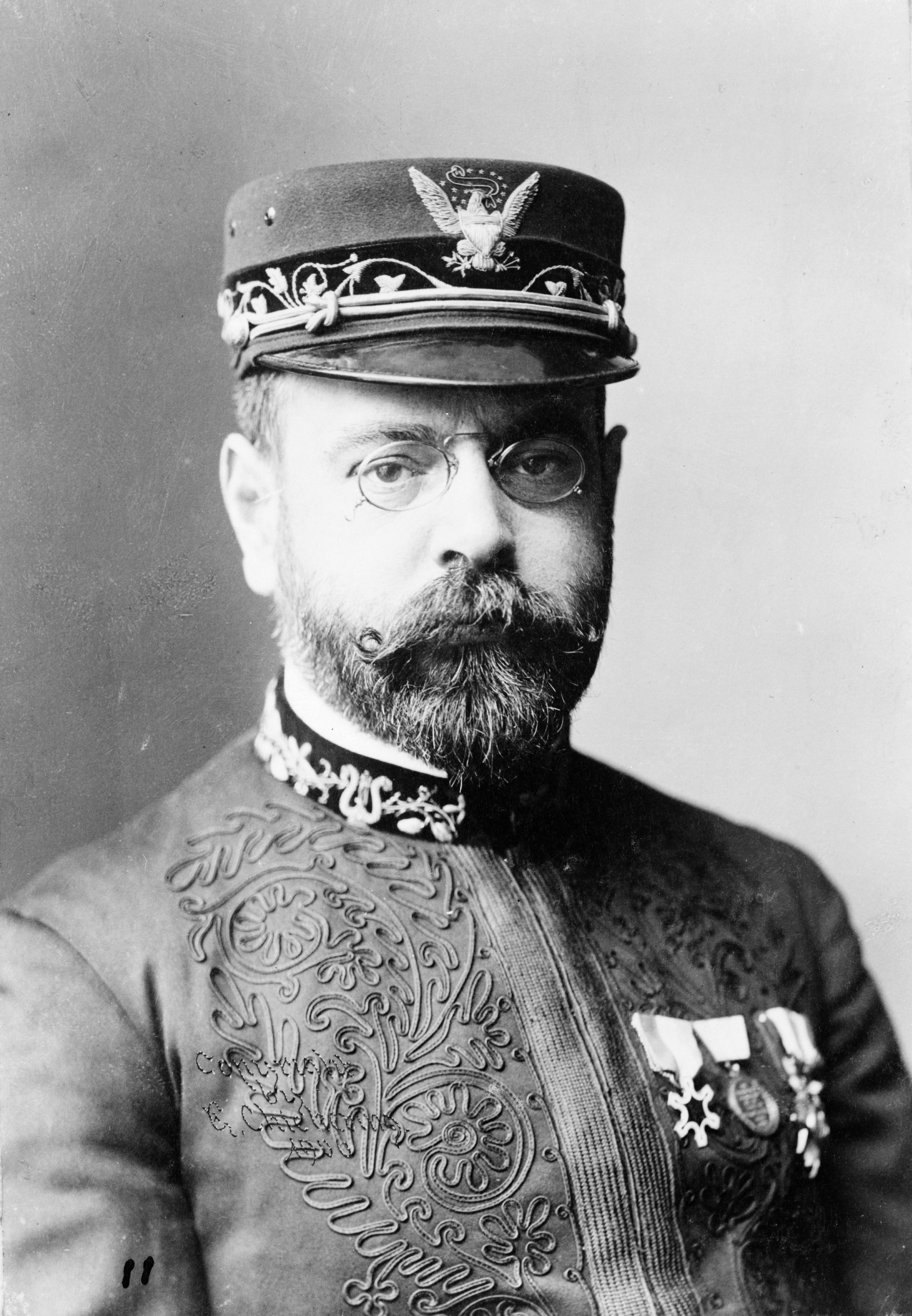
John Philip Sousa

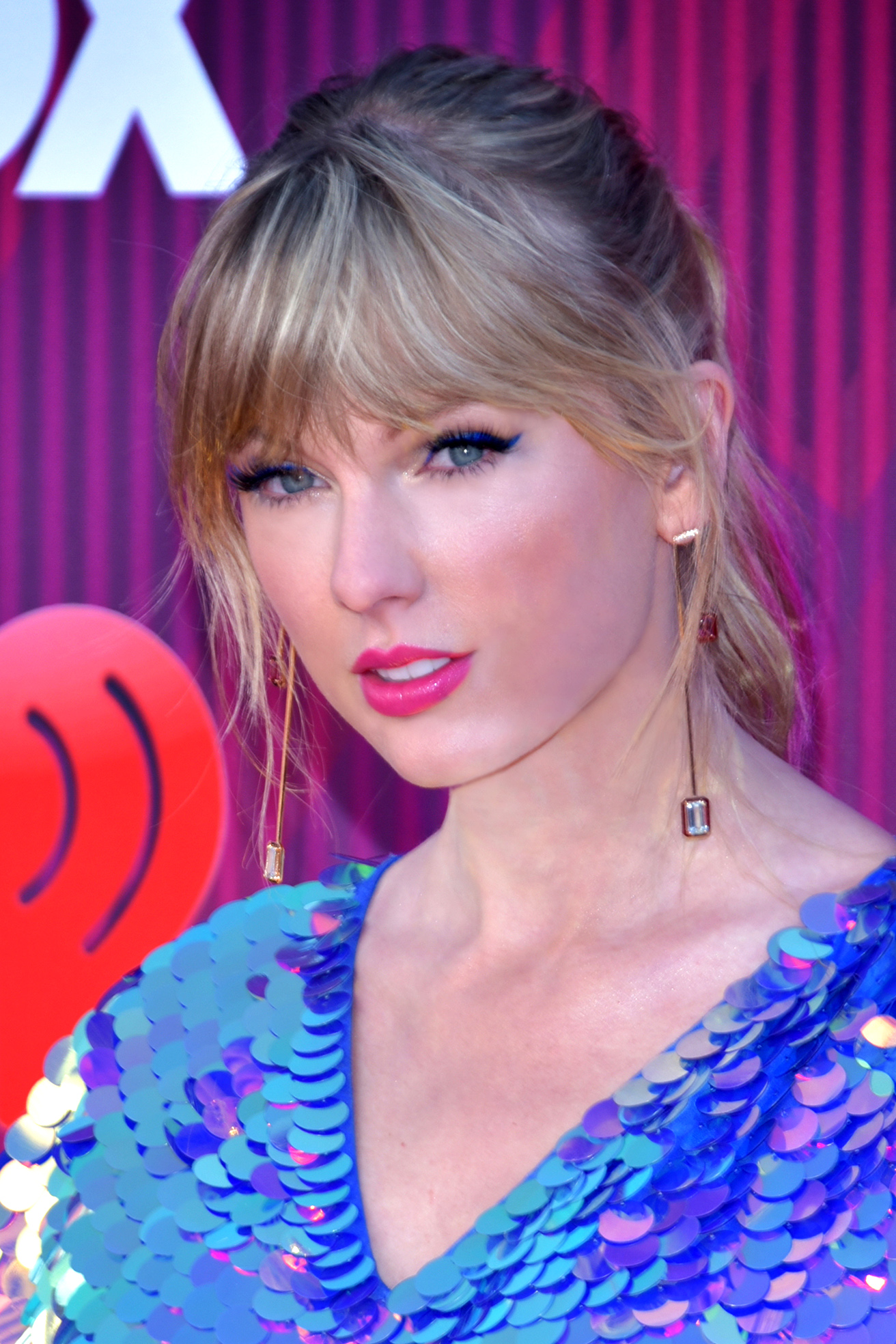
Taylor Swift

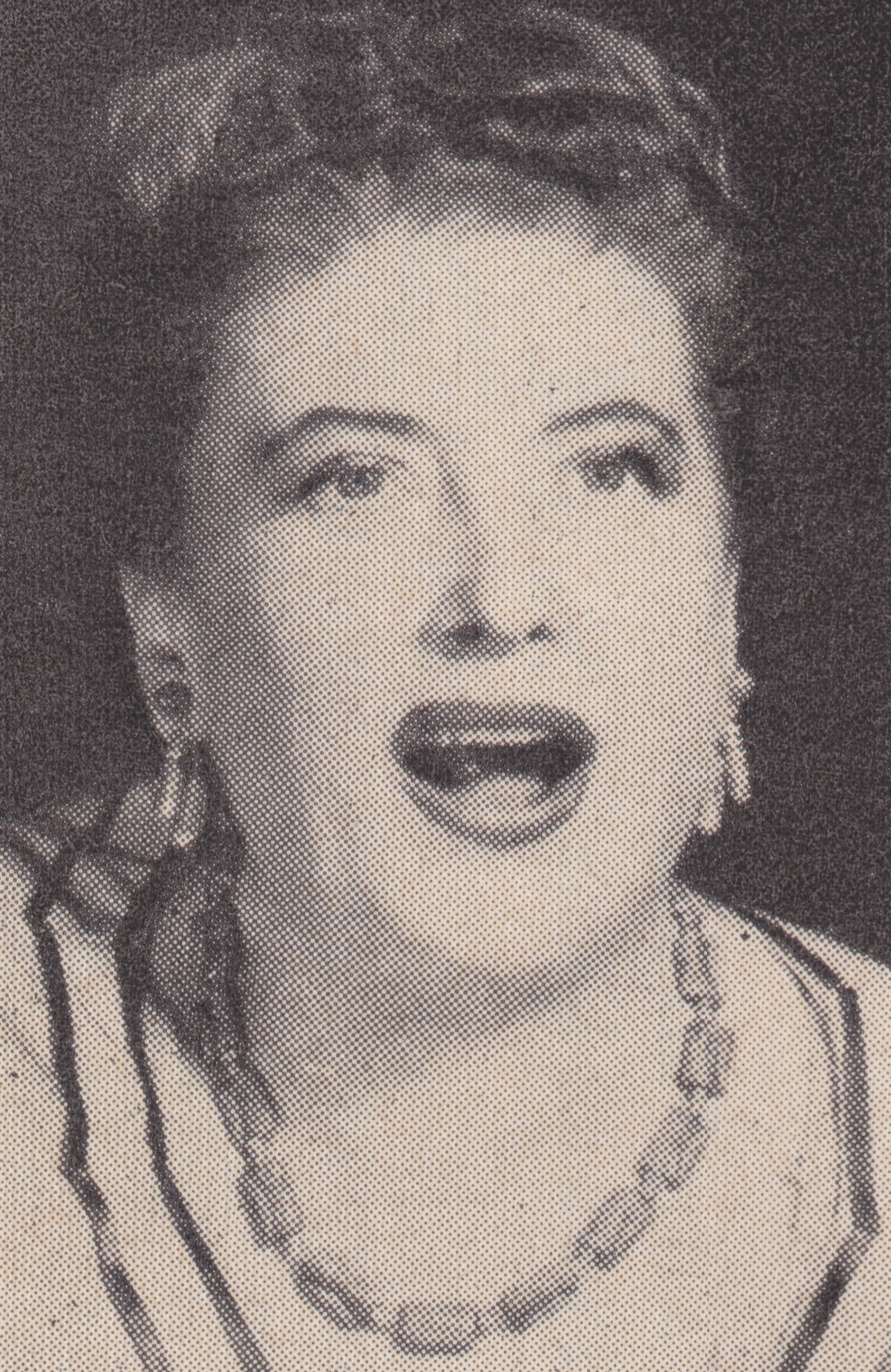
Helen Traubel

- Samuel Adler - composer, conductor and professor of classical music
- Anastacia (full name: Anastacia Lyn Newkirk) – singer-songwriter, and former dancer
- George Antheil – avant-garde composer, pianist, author, and inventor
- Bibi Bourelly – singer
- Andy Biersack – lead singer of Black Veil Brides
- Bix Beiderbecke – jazz cornet player and a classical and jazz pianist
- Jon Bon Jovi – singer and musician
- Sombr – singer
- Eva Cassidy – singer
- J. Cole – rapper, songwriter, record producer
- Tre Cool – punk rocker
- Christopher Cross – singer and musician
- Patrick Dahlheimer – bassist for the band Live
- Walter Johannes Damrosch – conductor
- John Denver (born Henry John Deutschendorf Jr.) – musician
- Edsel Dope (born Brian Ebejer) – lead singer of Dope
- Paul Dresser (born Johann Paul Dreiser Jr.) - singer, songwriter, and comedic actor of the late 19th and early 20th centuries
- Dave Dudley – (born David Darwin Pedruska) – country music singer
- David Ellefson – co-founder of thrash metal band Megadeth
- Eminem – rapper and actor
- Nancy Faust – former stadium organist for Major League Baseball's Chicago White Sox
- Lukas Foss – conductor
- Chris Frantz – musician and record producer; the drummer for both Talking Heads and the Tom Tom Club
- Norman Frauenheim – pianist and music teacher
- Ace Frehley – band member of Kiss
- Hugo Friedhofer – film music composer
- G-Eazy – rapper
- Louis F. Gottschalk – composer
- Dave Grohl – musician
- Hilary Hahn – violinist
- Daryl Hall – co-founder and principal lead vocalist of Hall & Oates
- Jeff Hanneman – guitarist of Slayer
- Reinhold Heil – film and television composer
- Otto K. E. Heinemann – manager for the U.S. branch of German-owned Odeon Records
- James Hetfield – vocalist, rhythm guitarist and co-founder of Metallica
- Elbert Joseph Higgins – songwriter
- Paul Hindemith – composer, violinist and teacher
- Hanya Holm – choreographer
- Horst P. Horst – photographer
- Josh Kaufman – singer-songwriter and season six winner of NBC's The Voice
- John Kay (born Joachim Fritz Krauledat) - German-born American rock singer, songwriter, and guitarist known as the frontman of Steppenwolf
- John Kiffmeyer – first drummer of the punk rock band Green Day
- Bobby Kimball – original lead vocalist of the rock band Toto
- Otto Klemperer – conductor
- Alison Krauss – bluegrass-country singer-songwriter, and musician
- Nick Lachey – pop singer
- Armando Lichtenberger Jr. – member of musical band La Mafia
- Charles Martin Loeffler – composer
- Courtney Love – actress and frontwoman of Hole
- Marilyn Manson – front man of rock band Marilyn Manson
- Martina McBride – country music singer-songwriter and record producer
- Melissa Auf der Maur – rock singer
- Alyson Michalka – actress, singer-songwriter, and guitarist
- Amanda Michalka – actress, singer-songwriter, and guitarist
- Sanford A. Moeller – rudimental drummer, national champion, educator, author and Spanish–American War veteran
- Tomo in der Mühlen – DJ, producer and guitar player, known for work with Harold Perrineau, Masta Ace, Styles P, and Ekatarina Velika
- Dave Mustaine – co-founder of thrash metal band Megadeth and first lead guitarist for thrash metal band Metallica
- Charles Theodore Pachelbel – baroque composer, organist and harpsichordist, son of Johann Pachelbel
- James Pankow – trombone player for the rock band Chicago
- Jaco Pastorius – musician and songwriter widely acknowledged for his virtuosity with the fretless bass
- Jaan Patterson – founder of the Surrism-Phonoethics label, also known as Undress Béton
- Les Paul (born Lester William Polsfuss) – jazz, country, and blues guitarist, songwriter, luthier, and inventor
- Katy Perry – singer and songwriter
- Kim Petras – German singer and songwriter based in Los Angeles
- Philip Phile – composer, best known for "The President's March", composed for the inauguration of President George Washington
- Pink (Alecia Beth Moore) – singer, songwriter, dancer, and actress
- Jimmy Pop – musician, composer, comedian and lead singer of the Bloodhound Gang
- Elvis Presley – singer-songwriter, and actor
- Charlie Puth — singer-songwriter, brother of Stephen Puth
- R.A. the Rugged Man - rapper and producer
- Dee Dee Ramone – bassist for the Ramones
- Trent Reznor – musician, film score composer and founder of Nine Inch Nails
- Olivia Rodrigo – singer and actress
- Heinz Eric Roemheld – composer; won the Academy Award for Best Original Music Score for Yankee Doodle Dandy in 1943
- Linda Ronstadt – singer-songwriter
- Dieter Ruehle – stadium organist for Major League Baseball's Los Angeles Dodgers and National Hockey League's Los Angeles Kings
- Nate Ruess – singer-songwriter and musician, best known as the lead vocalist of indie rock band Fun
- Felix Salten – composed scores for some 150 Hollywood movies
- Arnold Schoenberg – expressionist movement in German poetry and art, and leader of the Second Viennese School
- Nico Schüler – music theorist, musicologist, musician, composer, educator
- Wesley Schultz – guitarist and lead vocalist for the American folk rock band The Lumineers
- Pete Seeger – folk singer
- John Philip Sousa – composer and conductor of the late Romantic era, known particularly for American military and patriotic marches
- James Shaffer – co-founder and guitarist of the nu metal band Korn
- Paul Stanley – musician from the band Kiss, of Jewish descent
- Frederick Stock – composer and conductor with the Chicago Symphony Orchestra
- Mark Stoermer – musician, producer and singer-songwriter; bassist for alternative rock band the Killers
- Joel Stroetzel – guitarist from the metalcore band Killswitch Engage
- Alec John Such - musician and former member of bon Jovi
- John Summit – DJ and Record Producer
- Taylor Swift – singer-songwriter
- Lil Peep – rapper, singer-songwriter
- Machine Gun Kelly – rapper, singer and actor
- Theodore Thomas – conductor
- Helen Traubel - opera and concert singer
- Obie Trice – rapper
- Steven Tyler – lead singer of Aerosmith
- Eddie Vedder – lead vocalist of Pearl Jam
- Kurt Weill – composer
- Lawrence Welk – bandleader
- Pete Wentz – bassist for Fall Out Boy
- Hans Zimmer – Academy Award-winning film composer
- Wolfgang Zuckermann – harpsichord maker and writer

=== Directors, producers, screenwriters, and film editors ===
- Robert Altman – film director, screenwriter, and producer
- Michael Ballhaus – cinematographer
- Gesine Bullock-Prado – pastry chef, TV personality, author, attorney, and former film executive
- Frank Dexter (1882–1965) – German-born American art director
- Roy O. Disney – entertainment industry executive
- Roland Emmerich – Hollywood film director
- Paul Feig – actor and director
- Steven Fischer – producer and director; two-time Primetime Emmy Award nominee
- Ray Harryhausen – visual effects creator, writer, and producer
- Jim Jarmusch – film director and screenwriter
- Carl Laemmle – pioneer in American filmmaking and a founder of one of the original major Hollywood movie studios
- Ernst Lubitsch – acclaimed film director, special Academy Award winner
- Anthony Mann – film director and actor
- Richard C. Meyer – German-American television and film editor
- Russ Meyer – director and photographer
- F. W. Murnau – film director of the silent era
- Seymour Nebenzahl – film producer
- Kurt Neumann – Hollywood film director who specialized in science fiction
- Mike Nichols – Academy Award-winning film director, writer and producer
- Arch Oboler – scriptwriter, novelist, producer and director who was active in films, radio and television
- Wolfgang Petersen – director
- Kelly Reichardt – screenwriter and film director working within American indie cinema
- Gottfried Reinhardt – producer and director
- Ringling brothers – circus owners
- Victor Schertzinger – composer, film director, film producer, and screenwriter
- Eugen Schüfftan – cinematographer and inventor
- Nev Schulman – producer, actor, and photographer
- Reinhold Schünzel – director and actor
- Robert Siodmak – director
- Wim Wenders – film director
- William Wyler – film director
- Florenz Ziegfeld Jr. – Broadway impresario, notable for his series of theatrical revues, the Ziegfeld Follies
- George Lucas-director, founder of Lucasfilm, of German and Swiss-German descent
- Matt Groening-animator, cartoonist, creator of The Simpsons and Futurama franchises and Disenchantment, father is of German-Canadian descent

=== Humorists ===
- Michael Ian Black (born Michael Ian Schwartz) – comedian, actor, writer, and director
- David Letterman – late-night talk show host and comedian and the host of CBS's Late Show with David Letterman
- Daniel Tosh – comedian, host of Comedy Central's Tosh.0

=== Models ===
- Wilhelmina Cooper – model and founder of Wilhelmina Models
- Cindy Crawford – model
- Rande Gerber – male model and entrepreneur
- Karlie Kloss – fashion model and entrepreneur
- Heidi Klum – model
- Alyssa Miller – model
- Nicole Brown Simpson – model
- Nena von Schlebrügge – former fashion model in the 1950s and 1960s, mother of actress Uma Thurman
- Chrissy Teigen – model of German Sinti descent.

== First Ladies of the United States ==
(in order by their husband's presidency)

- Lucretia Garfield
- Florence Harding
- Pat Nixon

== Historical figures ==
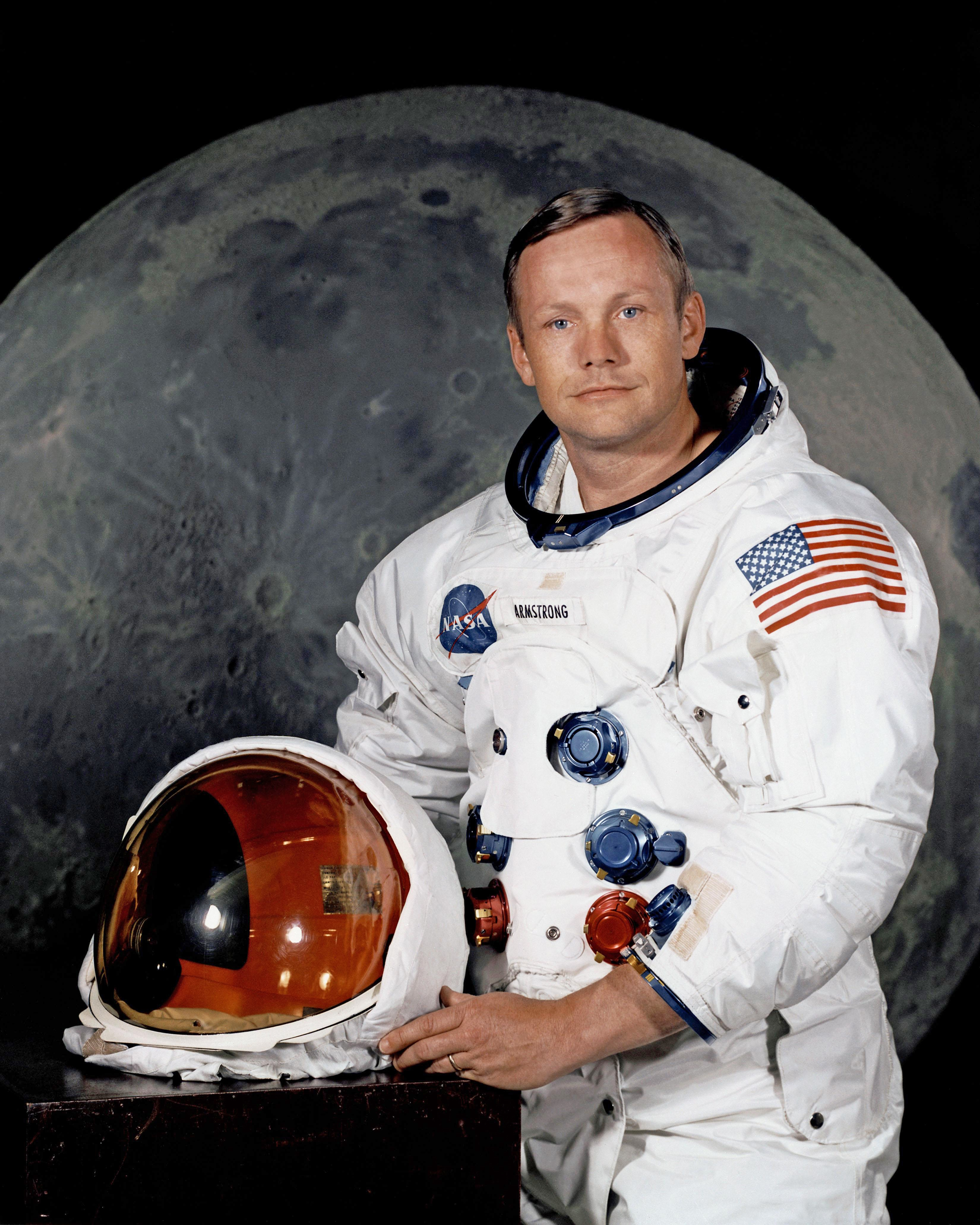
Neil Armstrong

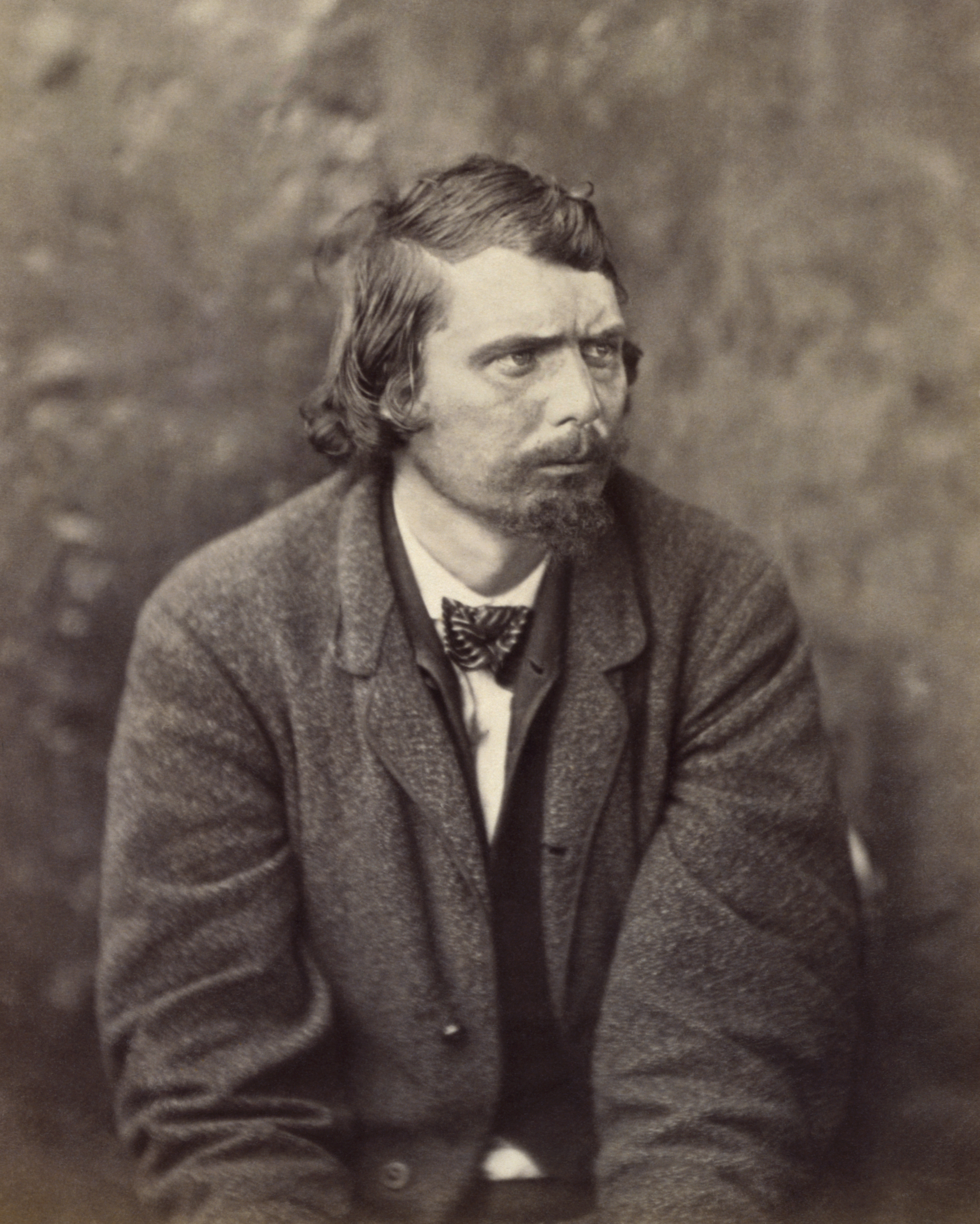
George Atzerodt

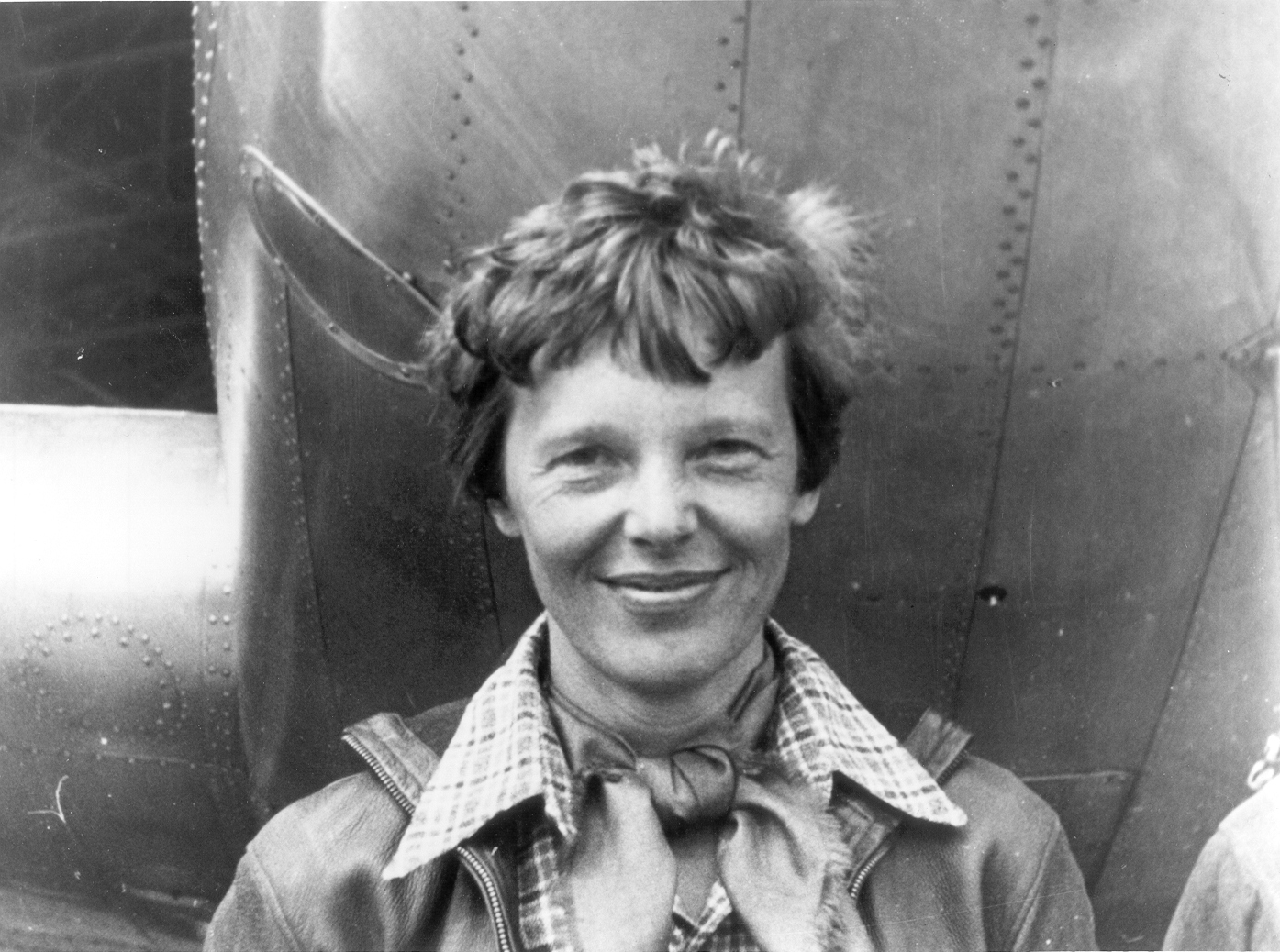
Amelia Earhart

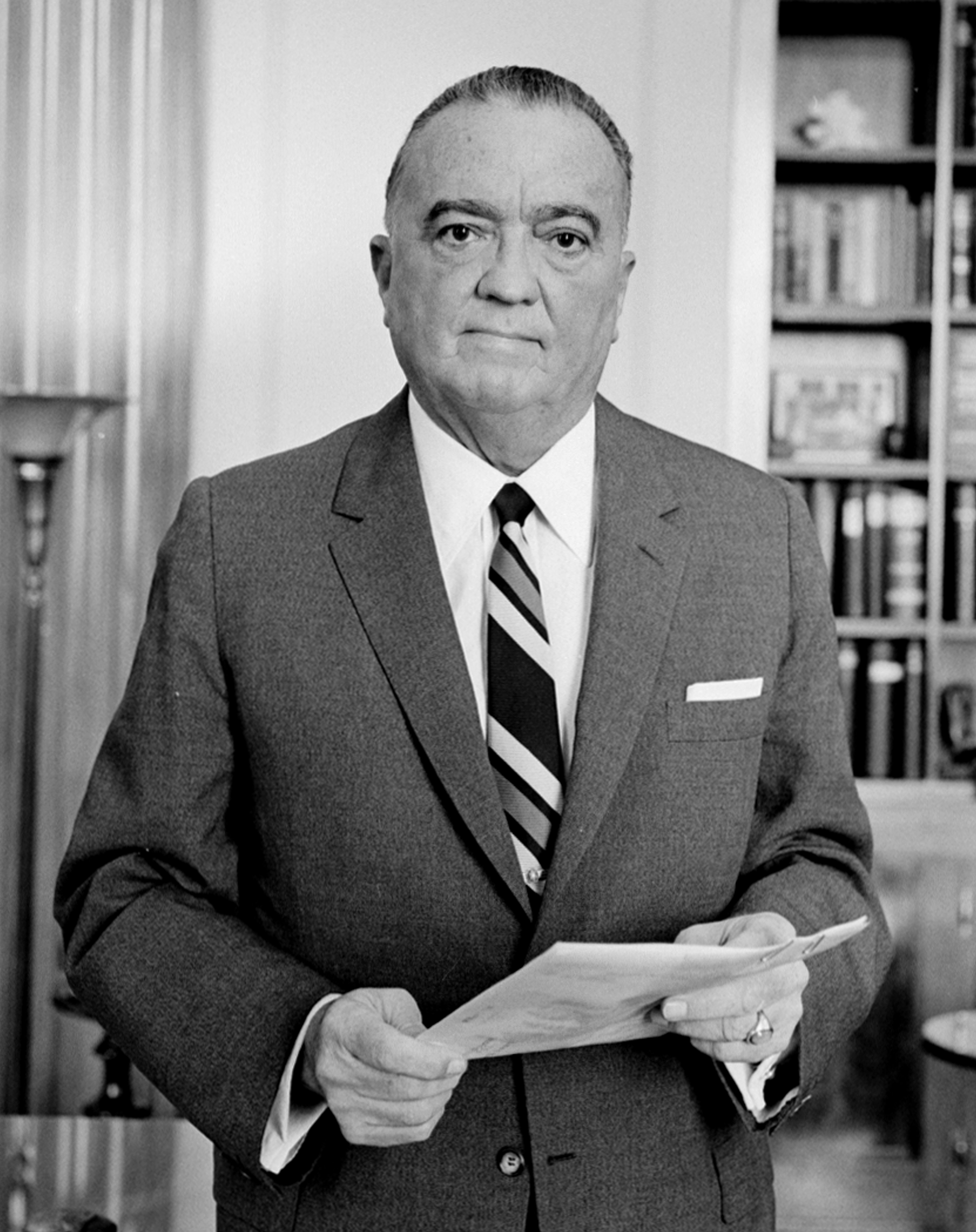
J. Edgar Hoover

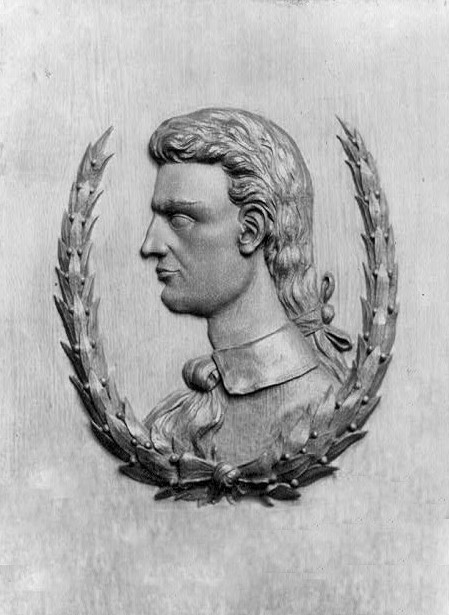
Francis Daniel Pastorius

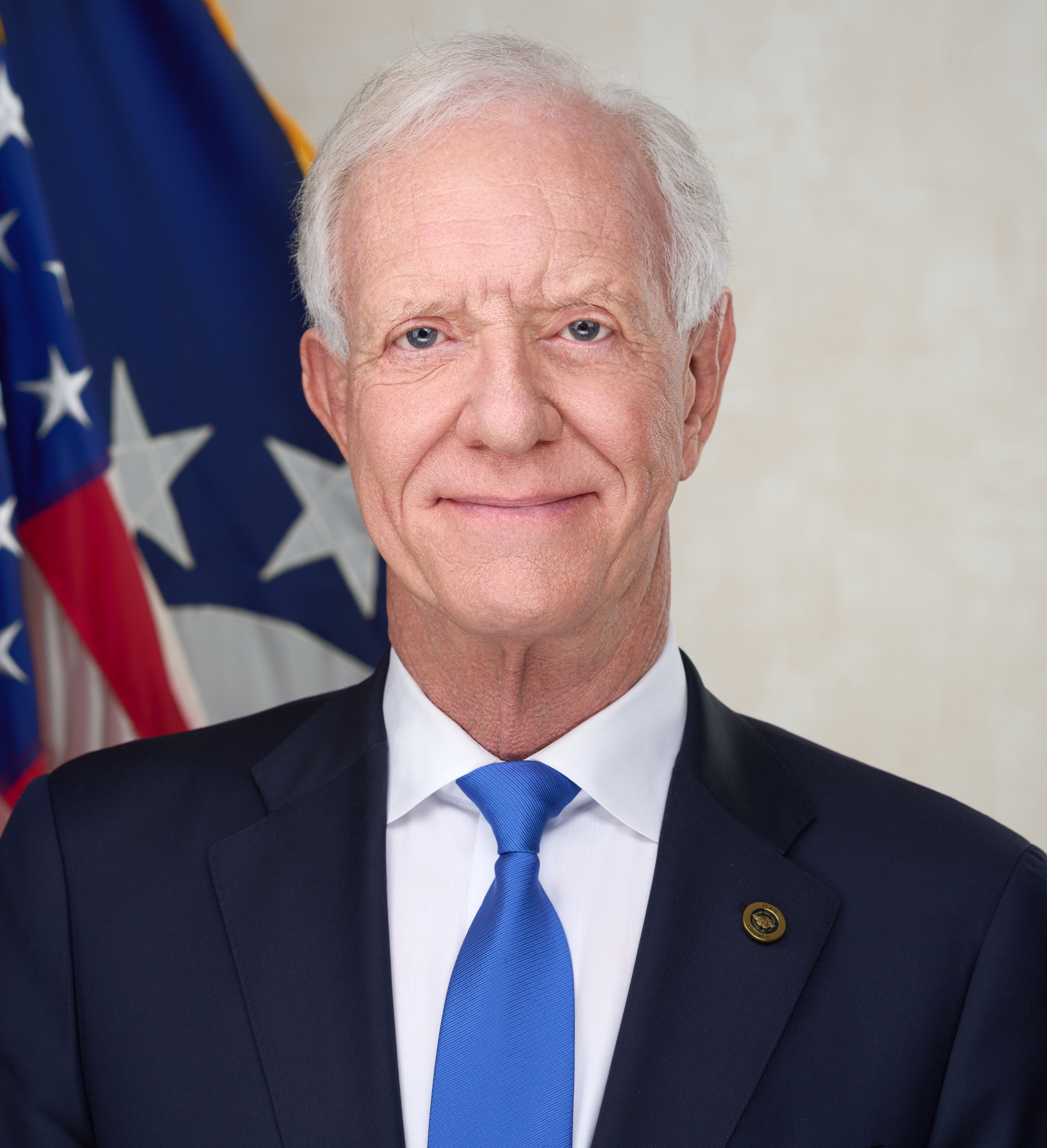
Sully Sullenberger

- Harry J. Anslinger – United States government official who served as the first commissioner of the United States Department of the Treasury's Federal Bureau of Narcotics, supporter of prohibition and the criminalization of drugs, and played a pivotal role in cannabis prohibition
- Neil Armstrong – astronaut, first human to set foot on the Moon
- George Atzerodt – assassin, conspirator in the assassination of Abraham Lincoln
- Meta Schlichting Berger – socialist organizer
- Frank Borman – astronaut, commander of the Apollo 8 mission, the first to fly around the Moon
- Warren E. Burger (1907–1995) – Chief Justice of the United States, 1969–86
- Willard Erastus Christianson aka Matt Warner – Old West outlaw, deputy sheriff
- Adolph Douai – educational reformer, abolitionist, newspaper editor, and labor leader
- Amelia Earhart – aviation pioneer and author, the first woman to receive the Distinguished Flying Cross
- Johann Friedrich Ernst – "Father of German Immigration to Texas", arriving in 1831
- Bobby Fischer – chess prodigy, grandmaster, and the eleventh World Chess Champion
- Henry Francis Fisher – German Texan in Houston, Texas, where he was consul for the Hanseatic League, became acting treasurer of the San Saba Company
- Meyer Guggenheim (1828–1905) – statesman, patriarch of what became known as the Guggenheim family
- Frank Gusenburg – gangster and a victim of the Saint Valentine's Day massacre in Chicago
- Peter Gusenberg – member of Chicago's North Side Gang, the main rival to the Chicago Outfit
- John F. Hartranft – military officer, awarded the Medal of Honor for his actions in the First Battle of Bull Run, served as the 17th governor of Pennsylvania
- Bruno Hauptmann – Lindbergh kidnapper
- Mary Hays – American Revolutionary War hero
- Alfons Heck – writer and former Hitler Youth
- Friedrich Hecker – revolutionary
- Michael Hillegas – first Treasurer of the United States
- Alger Hiss – American government official accused in 1948 of having spied for the Soviet Union in the 1930s, original surname of "Hesse"
- Jimmy Hoffa – labor union leader and author
- J. Edgar Hoover – first Director of the Federal Bureau of Investigation (FBI)
- Lena Kleinschmidt – jewel thief
- Fritz Kuhn – German American Bund leader
- Maria Kraus-Boelté – pioneer of Fröbel education in the United States, and helped promote kindergarten training as suitable for study at university level
- Herman Lamm – considered the "father of modern bank robbery"
- Johann Lederer – explorer
- Jacob Leisler – colonist
- Frank J. Loesch – law enforcement official, reformer and a founder of the Chicago Crime Commission
- Kurt Frederick Ludwig – head of the "Joe K" spy ring in the United States in 1940–41
- Paul Machemehl – German-Texan, rancher and civic leader
- Fredericka Mandelbaum – entrepreneur and criminal
- Nicola Marschall – designer of the first national flag and uniform of the Confederacy
- Christene Mayer – aka "Kid Glove Rosey", famous thief and associate of "Black" Lena Kleinschmidt
- Burchard Miller – Texas land pioneer
- Peter Minuit – Director-General of the Dutch colony of New Netherland
- Charles Mohr – pharmacist
- Duncan Niederauer – CEO of the New York Stock Exchange (NYSE)
- Madge Oberholtzer – schoolteacher who worked for the state of Indiana on adult literacy
- Franz Daniel Pastorius – pioneer and founder of Germantown, Pennsylvania
- Robert Prager – Illinois coal miner lynched during World War I because of anti-German sentiment
- Hermann Raster – Chicago politician, editor, and abolitionist
- Walter Reuther – labor leader
- Rockefeller family – industrial and political family that made one of the world's largest fortunes in the oil business during the late 19th and early 20th centuries
- Arthur M. Schlesinger Jr. – historian, social critic, and public intellectual
- August Schrader – engineer and mechanic
- Norman Schwarzkopf Sr. – Lindbergh kidnapping investigator
- Dutch Schultz (born Arthur Flegenheimer) – New York City-area gangster
- Margarethe Schurz – established the kindergarten system in the United States
- Frank "The German" Schweihs – alleged hitman who had been known to work for The Outfit, the organized crime family in Chicago
- Jacob Shallus – penman of the original copy of the United States Constitution
- Prince Carl of Solms-Braunfels – "Texas-Carl" was an Austro-Hungarian Lieutenant General and founder of the town New Braunfels, Texas
- Jacob Sternberger – historian and one of the original Forty-Eighters
- Ida Straus – victim of the sinking of the RMS Titanic
- Isidor Straus – former co-owner of Macy's and victim of the sinking of the RMS Titanic
- Chesley Sullenberger – commercial airline pilot, safety expert, and accident investigator; piloted US Airways Flight 1549 to a safe ditching in the Hudson River in New York City
- John Sutter – settler/colonizer
- Count Ludwig Joseph von Boos-Waldeck – organized the Adelsverein to promote German emigration to Texas
- Paul Warburg – banker
- Charles Maria Weber – pioneer of California and founder of Stockton, California
- John Henry Weber – fur trader and explorer in the Rocky Mountains. The Weber River, Weber State University, and Weber County, Utah, were named after him.
- Louis J. Weichmann – witness for the prosecution in the conspiracy trial of the assassination of Abraham Lincoln
- Conrad Weiser – pioneer, farmer, monk, tanner, judge, soldier, interpreter and diplomat between the Pennsylvania Colony and Native Americans
- Lewis Wetzel – frontiersman and Indian fighter
- Adam Worth – crime boss and fraudster
- John Peter Zenger – printer, publisher, editor and journalist in New York City
- David Ziegler – first mayor of Cincinnati; Revolutionary War Veteran and aide to president George Washington

== Military ==
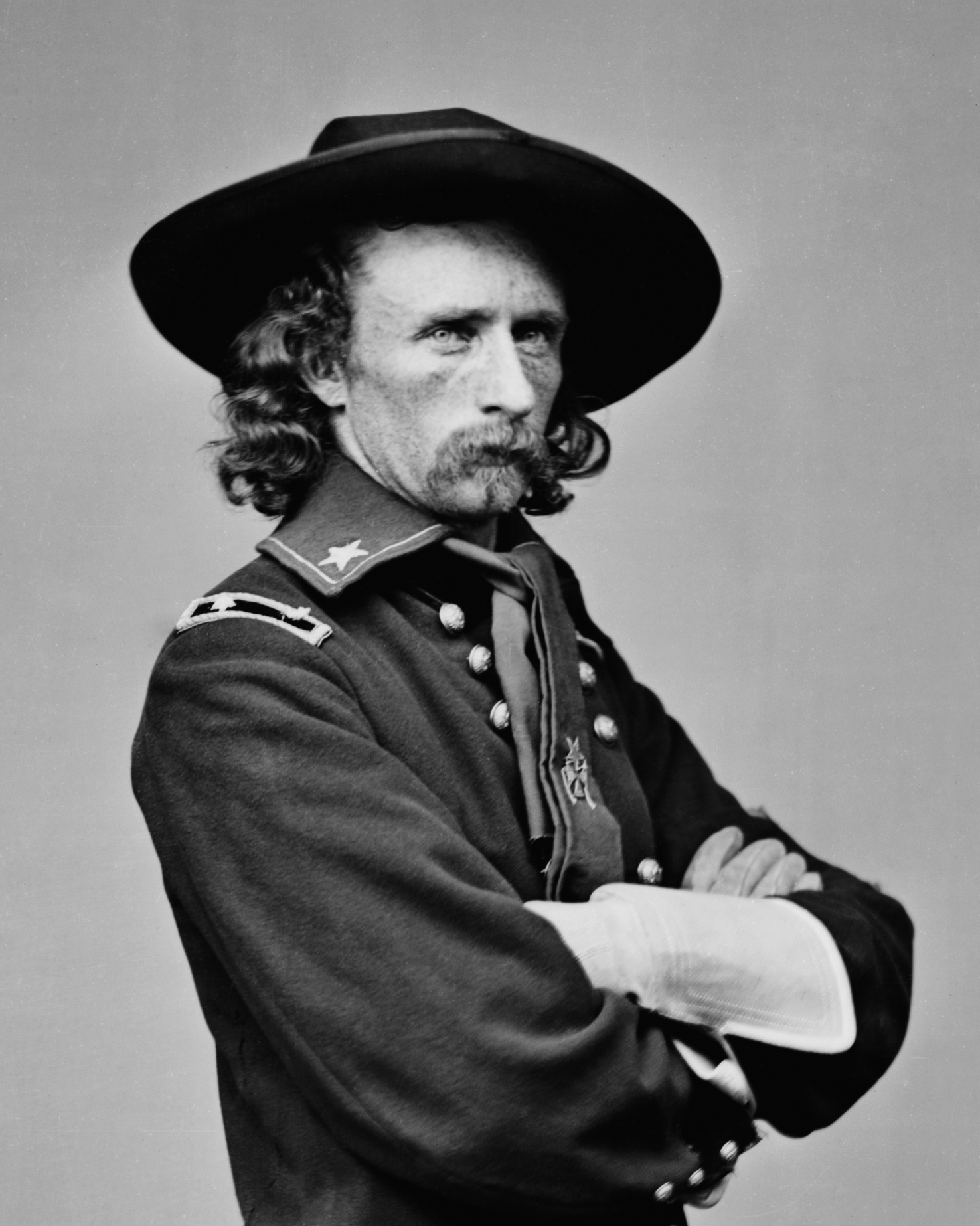
George Armstrong Custer

Aleda E. Lutz

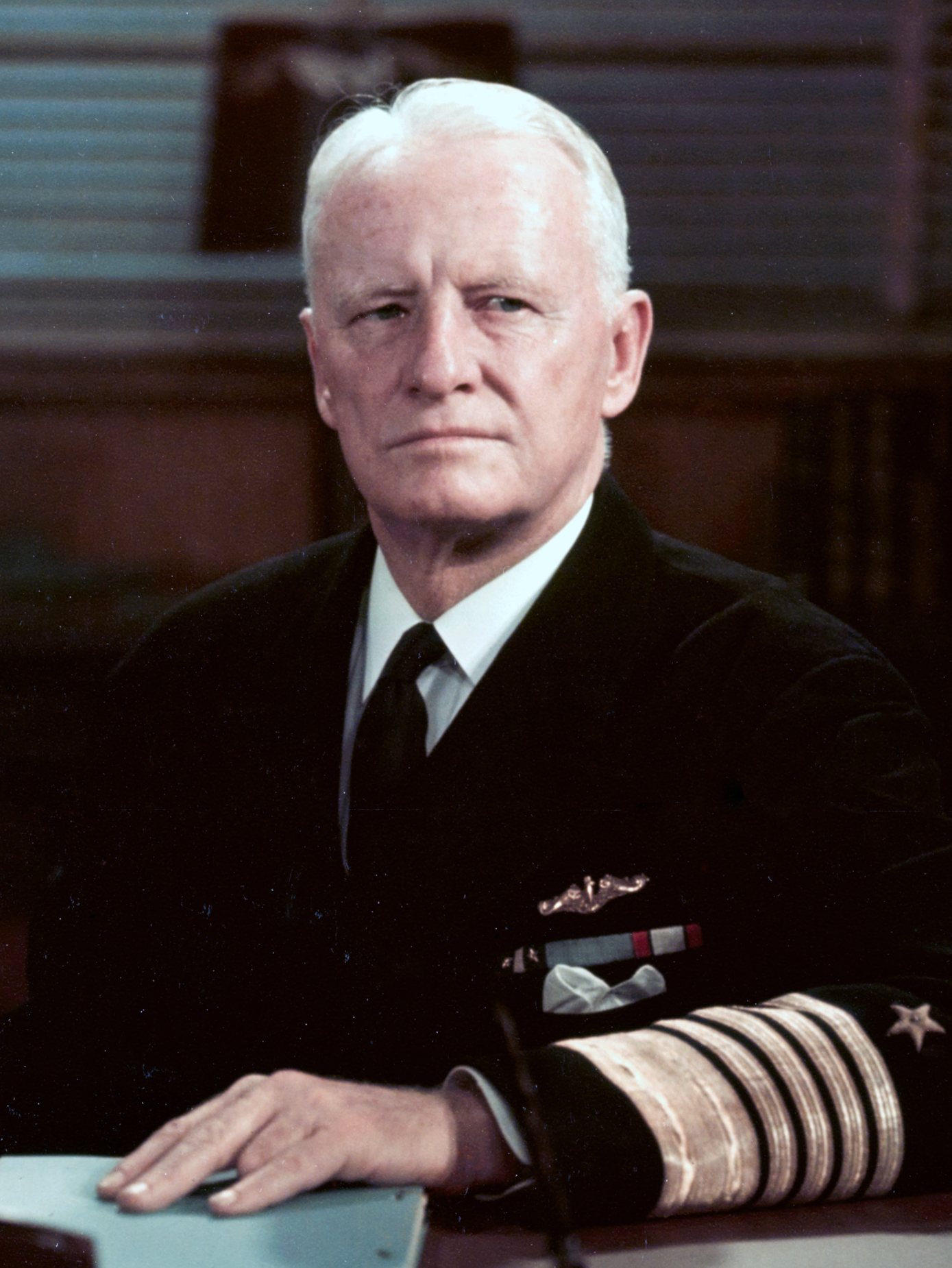
Chester W. Nimitz

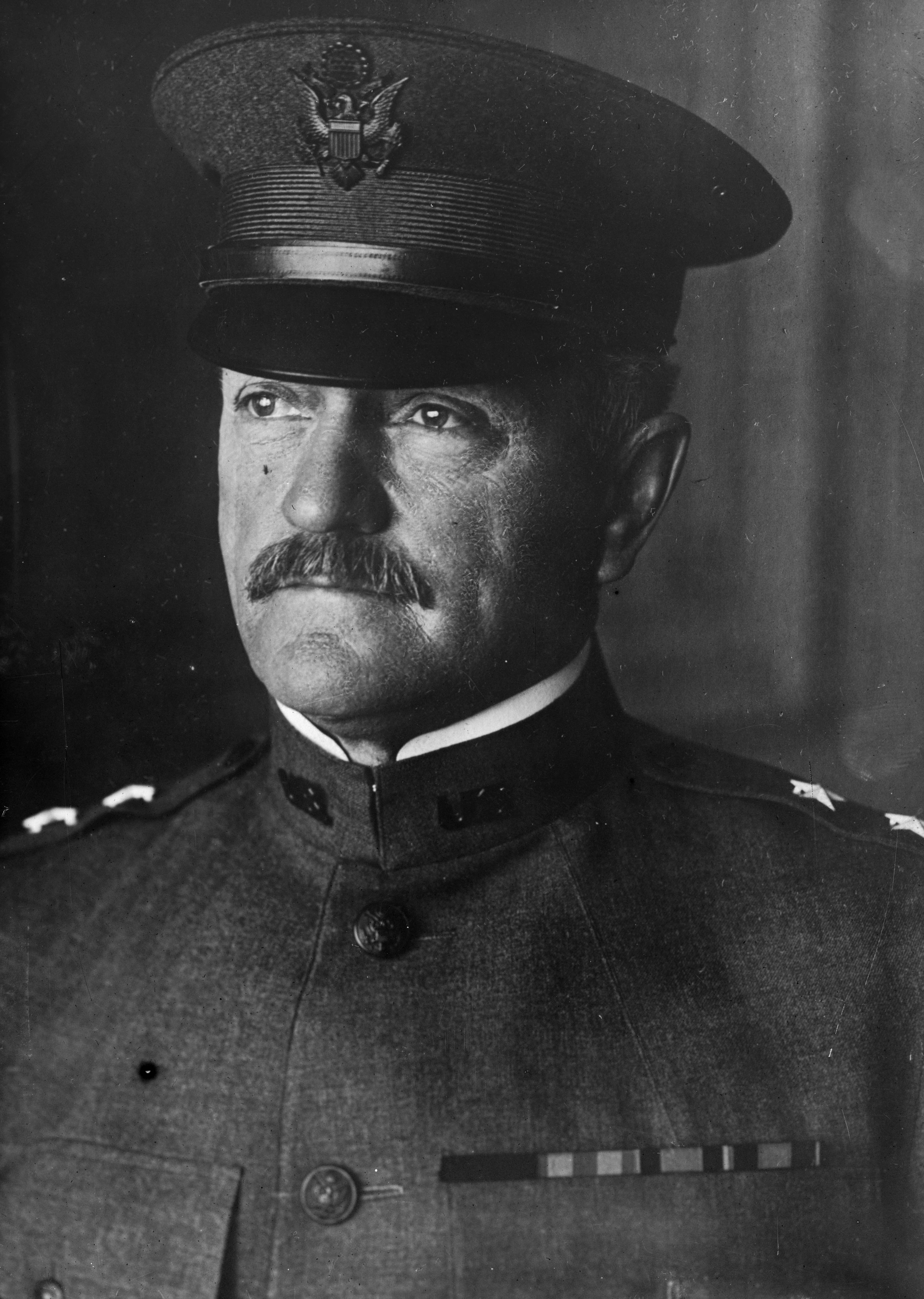
John J. Pershing

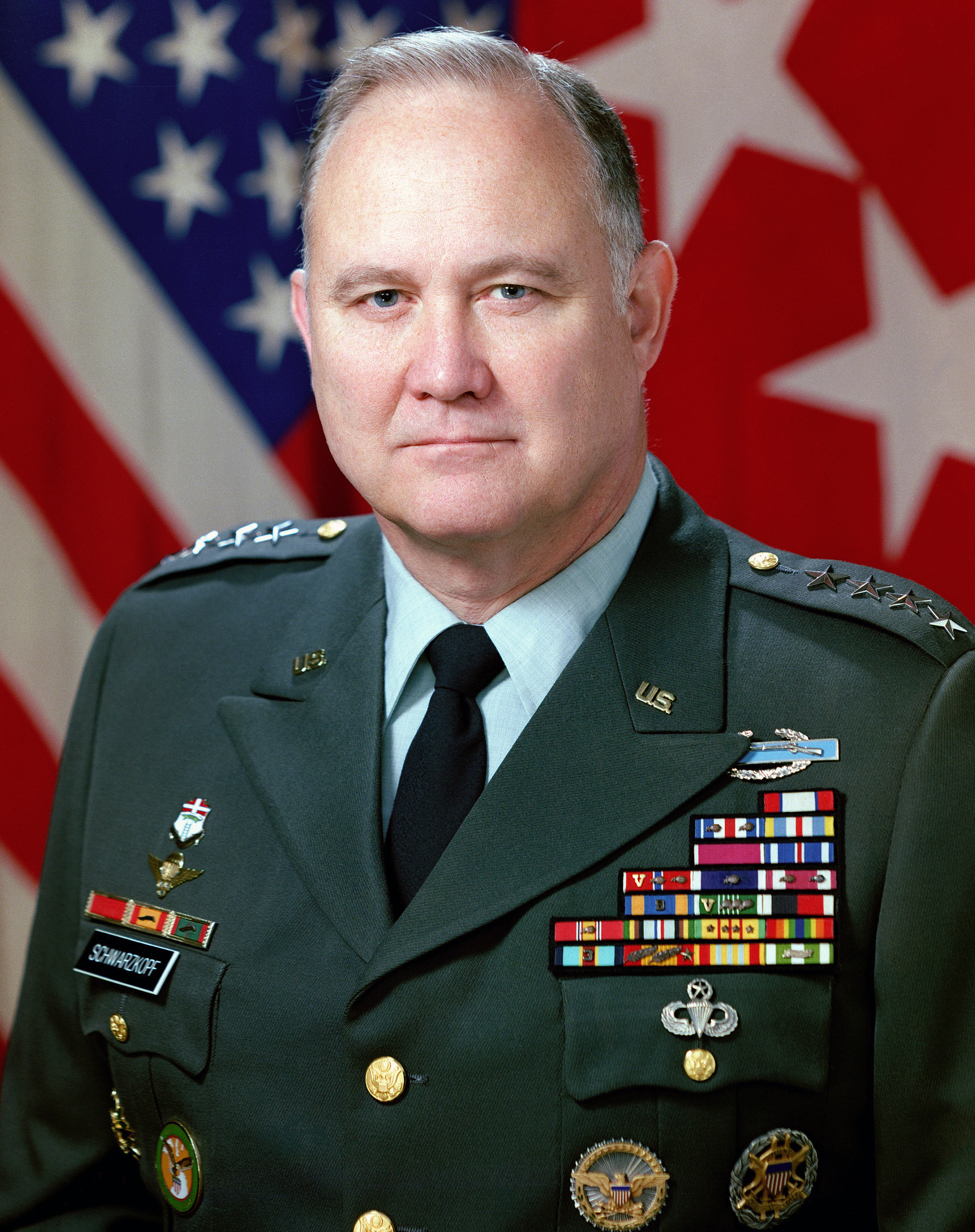
Norman Schwarzkopf

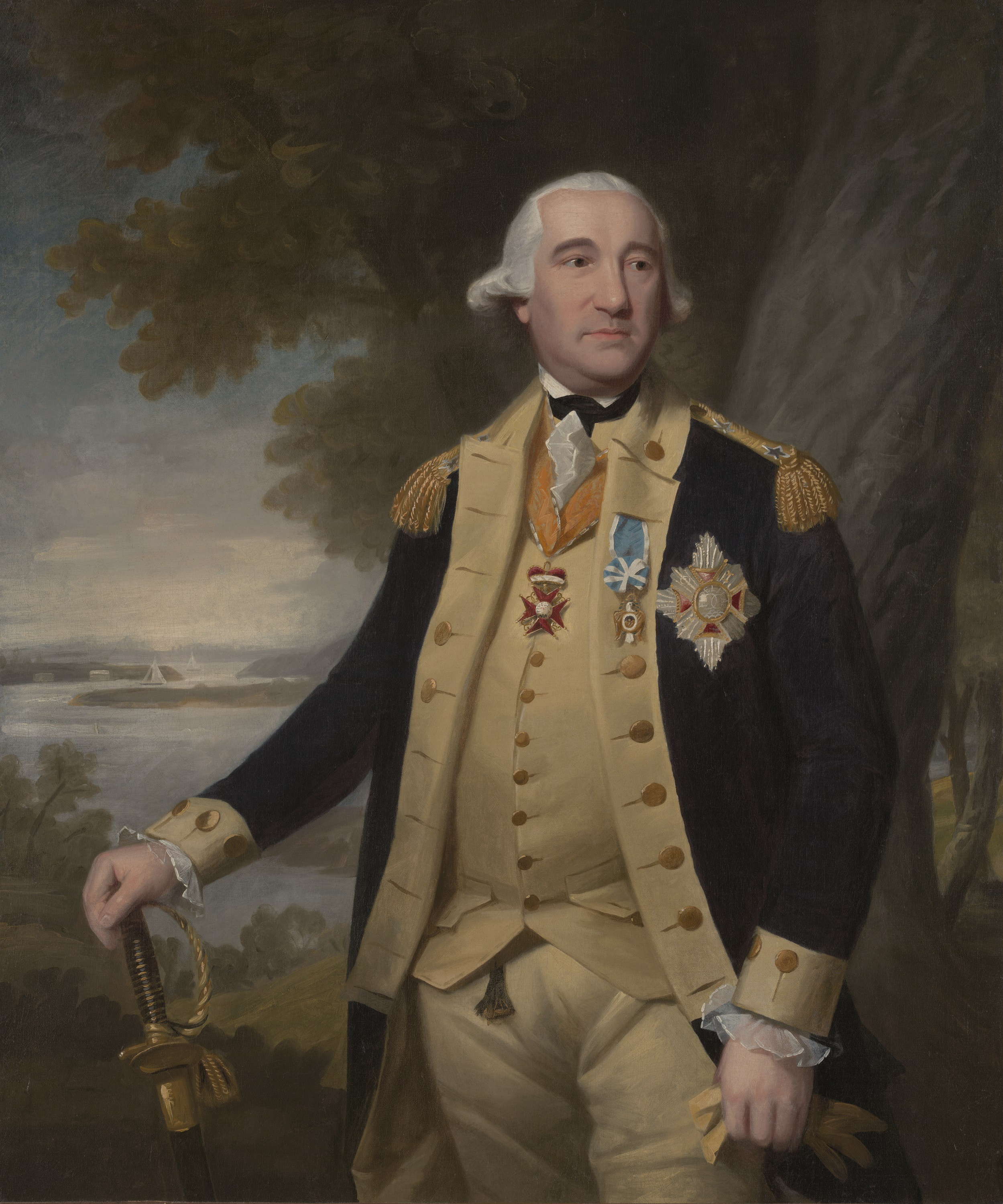
Baron von Steuben

- Rosemarie Aquilina – Judge, Michigan Army National Guardswoman, Michigan's first female member of the Judge Advocate General's Corps
- Robert J. Betge – Colonel of the 68th New York Volunteer Infantry Regiment
- Otto Boehler – United States Army private awarded the Medal of Honor for actions during the Moro Rebellion during the Philippine–American War
- Johann August Heinrich Heros von Borcke – Major in the Confederate army
- John Boyd – United States Air Force fighter pilot and Pentagon consultant during the second half of the 20th century
- Arent S. Crowninshield (1843–1908) – Commander of the USS Maine
- George Armstrong Custer (1839–1876) – United States Army cavalry commander
- Thomas Custer – United States Army officer and two-time recipient of the Medal of Honor for bravery during the American Civil War; a younger brother of George Armstrong Custer, perishing with him at Little Bighorn in the Montana Territory
- Konrad Dannenberg – rocket pioneer and member of the German Rocket Team, brought to the U.S. under Operation Paperclip
- Dieter Dengler – German born United States Navy Naval aviator during the Vietnam War
- Hubert Dilger – decorated artillerist in the Union Army during the American Civil War
- Walter Dornberger – leader of Germany's V-2 rocket program and other projects at the Peenemünde Army Research Center, brought to the U.S. under Operation Paperclip
- Johann de Kalb – Major general in the American Revolution
- Frank Finkel – claimed to be the only white survivor of the Battle of Little Big Horn
- Friedrich Hecker – lawyer, politician, revolutionary and Civil War colonel
- Lewis Heermann – commissioned Surgeon's Mate in the United States Navy February 8, 1802; in 1942, the destroyer USS Heermann was named in his honor
- Nicholas Herkimer – commanding general at Battle of Oriskany, American Revolutionary War
- Daniel Hiester – political and military leader from the Revolutionary War period to the early 19th century
- John Hiester – military leader from the Revolutionary War period to the early 19th century
- Ralph Ignatowski – soldier, of German and Polish descent, World War II veteran
- August Kautz – Brigadier general /Union Army officer
- Walter Krueger – United States Army general during World War II and military historian
- Eugene H. C. Leutze – admiral of the United States Navy, appointed to the United States Naval Academy by President Abraham Lincoln in 1863
- Frank Luke – aviator in World War I, Medal of Honor recipient
- Aleda E. Lutz – American Army flight nurse during World War II, second-most decorated woman in American military history
- Marc Mitscher – Vice Admiral in the U.S. Navy; served as commander of the Fast Carrier Task Force in the Pacific in the latter half of World War II
- Peter Muhlenberg – clergyman, soldier and a politician of the Colonial, Revolutionary, and Post-Revolutionary eras in Pennsylvania
- Chester W. Nimitz – Commander in Chief of Pacific Forces for the United States and Allied forces during World War II
- Peter Osterhaus – Union Army general in the American Civil War, later serving as a U.S. diplomat
- John J. Pershing – officer in the United States Army, rose to the highest rank ever held in the U.S. Army – General of the Armies
- Friedrich Adolf Riedesel – regiment commander of the Duchy of Brunswick (Braunschweig) unit hired by the British during the American Revolution
- Alexander Schimmelfennig – American Civil War general in the Union Army
- James Martinus Schoonmaker – colonel in the Union Army in the American Civil War and a vice-president of the Pittsburgh and Lake Erie Railroad
- Theodore Schwan – officer who served with distinction during the American Civil War, Spanish–American War and the Philippine–American War
- Norman Schwarzkopf Jr. – United States Army General
- Albert Sieber – U.S. Civil War veteran, Chief of Scouts for much of the Apache Wars
- Franz Sigel – teacher, newspaperman, politician, and served as a Union general in the American Civil War
- Carl Andrew Spaatz – general in World War II
- Adolph von Steinwehr – served as a Union general in the American Civil War
- Friedrich Wilhelm Ludolf Gerhard Augustin von Steuben – German–Prussian general; served with George Washington in the American Revolutionary War
- Gustav Tafel – colonel in the Union Army during the American Civil War
- Stephen J. Townsend – U.S. Army general, served with the 10th Mountain Division during the war in Afghanistan; born in (West) Germany
- Max Weber – brigadier general in the Union army during the American Civil War;
- Lewis Wetzel – frontiersman and Indian fighter who roamed the hills of western Virginia and Ohio; Wetzel County, West Virginia, is named for him
- Godfrey Weitzel – Major General in the Union army during the American Civil War
- August Willich – general in the Union Army during the American Civil War
- Charles Henry Wilcken – artilleryman who was awarded the Iron Cross by the King of Prussia, Frederick William IV
- Jurgen Wilson – Union Army officer during the American Civil War
- Frederick C. Winkler – lieutenant colonel in the Union Army during the American Civil War
- Chuck Yeager – United States Air Force officer, test pilot, and flying ace, first confirmed person to exceed the speed of sound in flight

== Philosophers ==
- Felix Adler – rationalist intellectual
- Hannah Arendt – political theorist
- Rudolf Carnap – philosopher
- Adolf Grünbaum – philosopher
- Eric Hoffer – philosopher
- Susanne Langer – philosopher, writer, and educator
- Francis Lieber – jurist/political philosopher
- Herbert Marcuse – philosopher (1898–1979)
- Nicholas Rescher – philosopher
- Richard Rorty – philosopher

== Politicians and public servants ==
George W. Bush

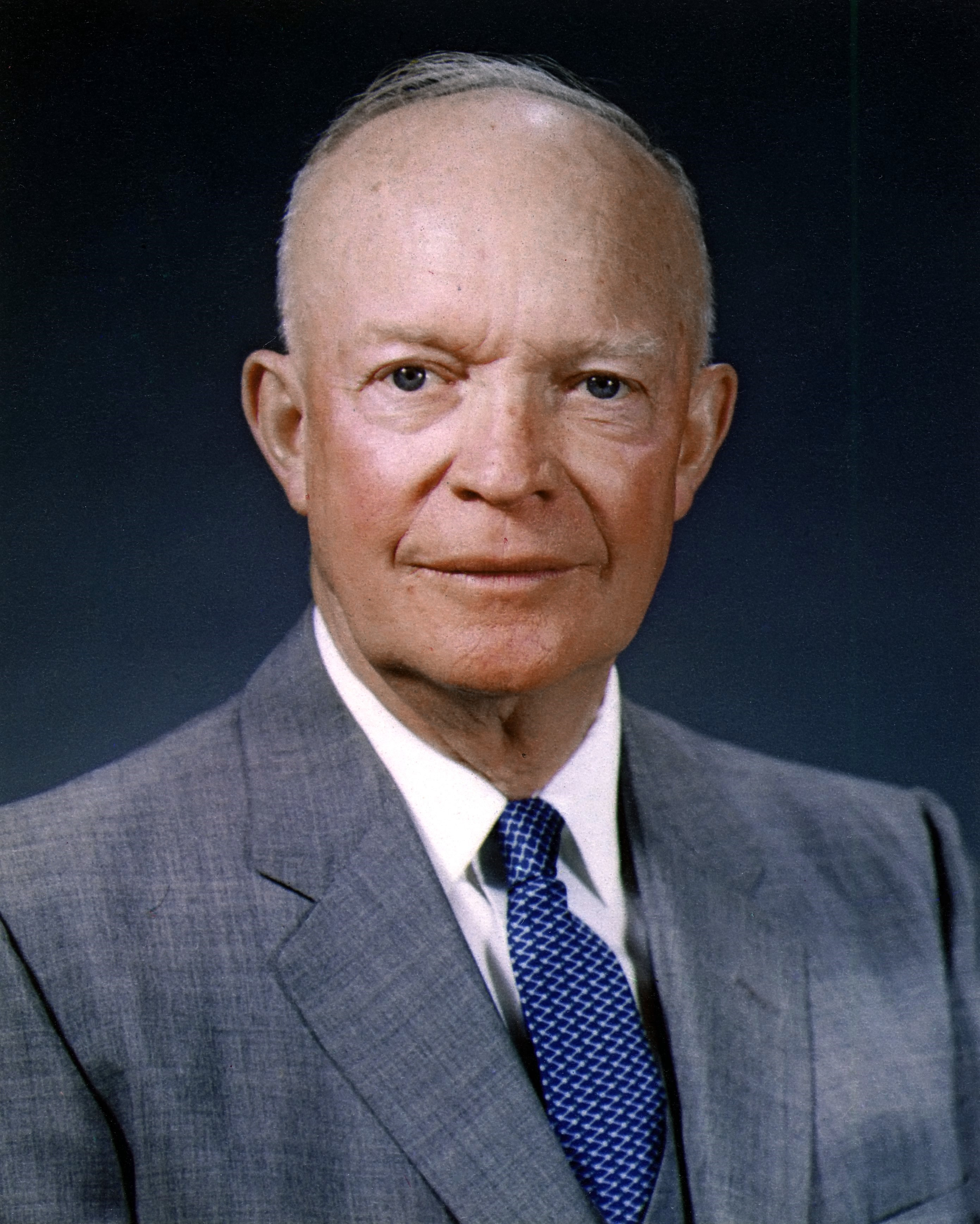
Dwight D. Eisenhower

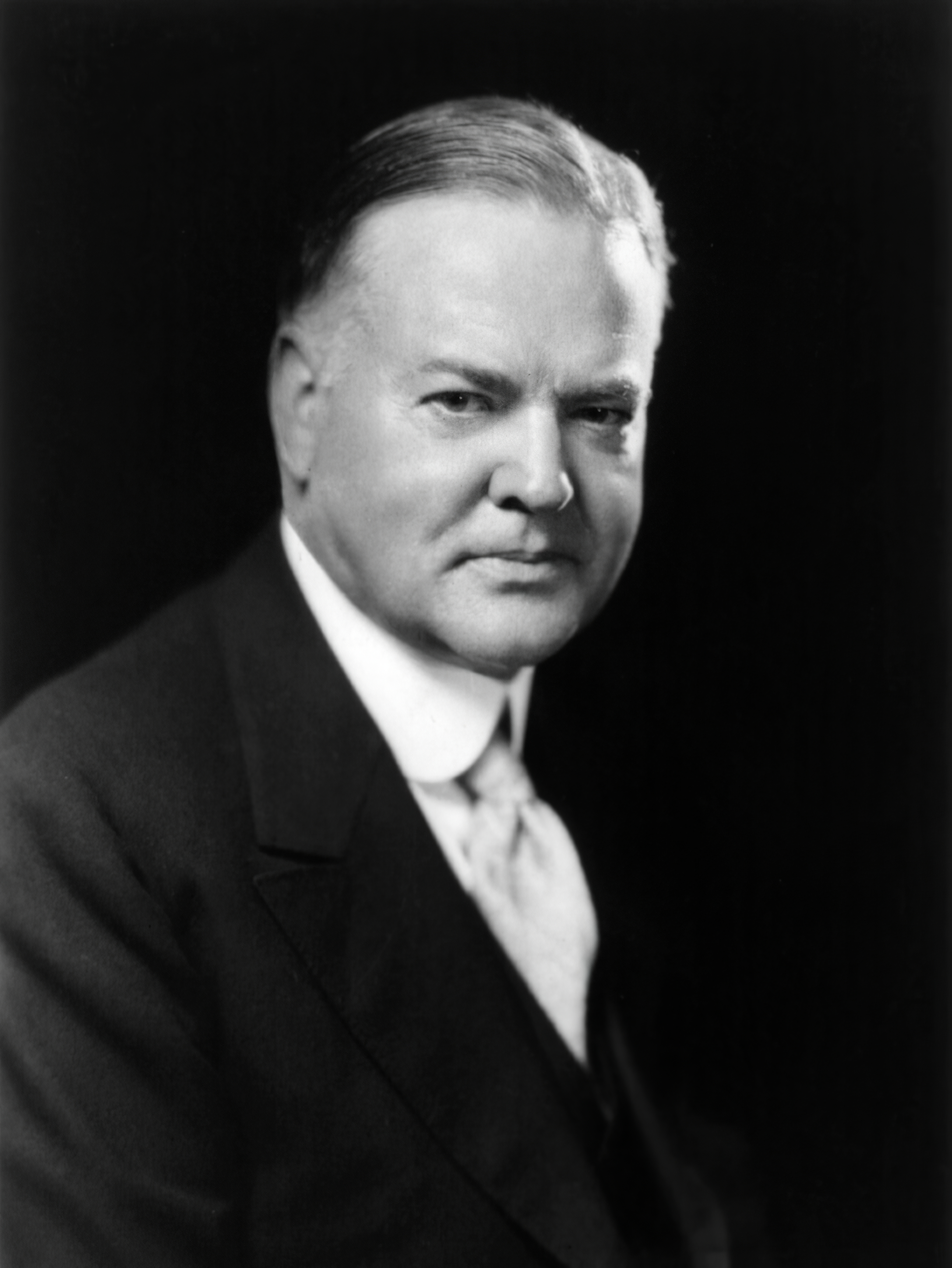
Herbert Hoover

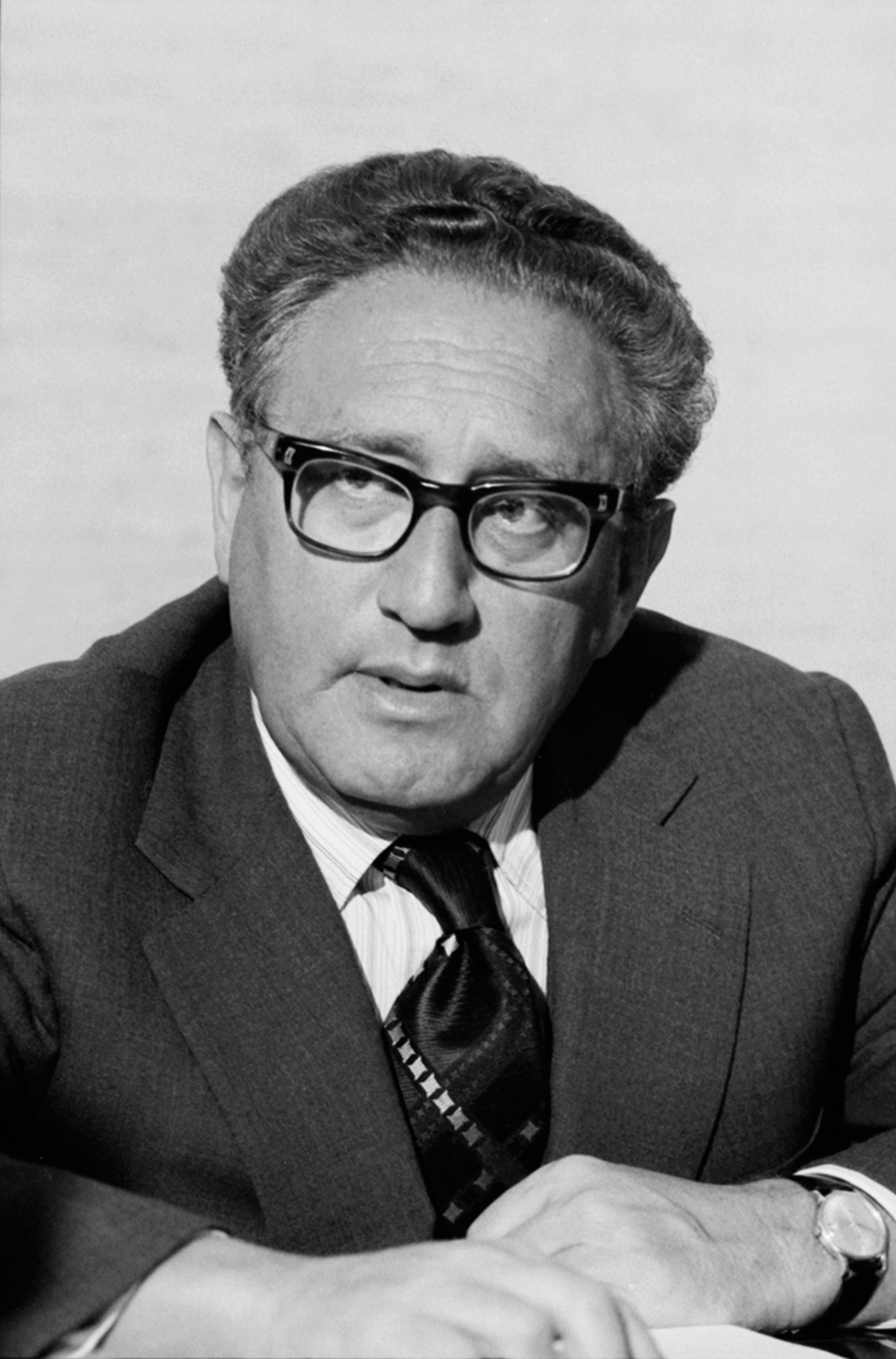
Henry Kissinger

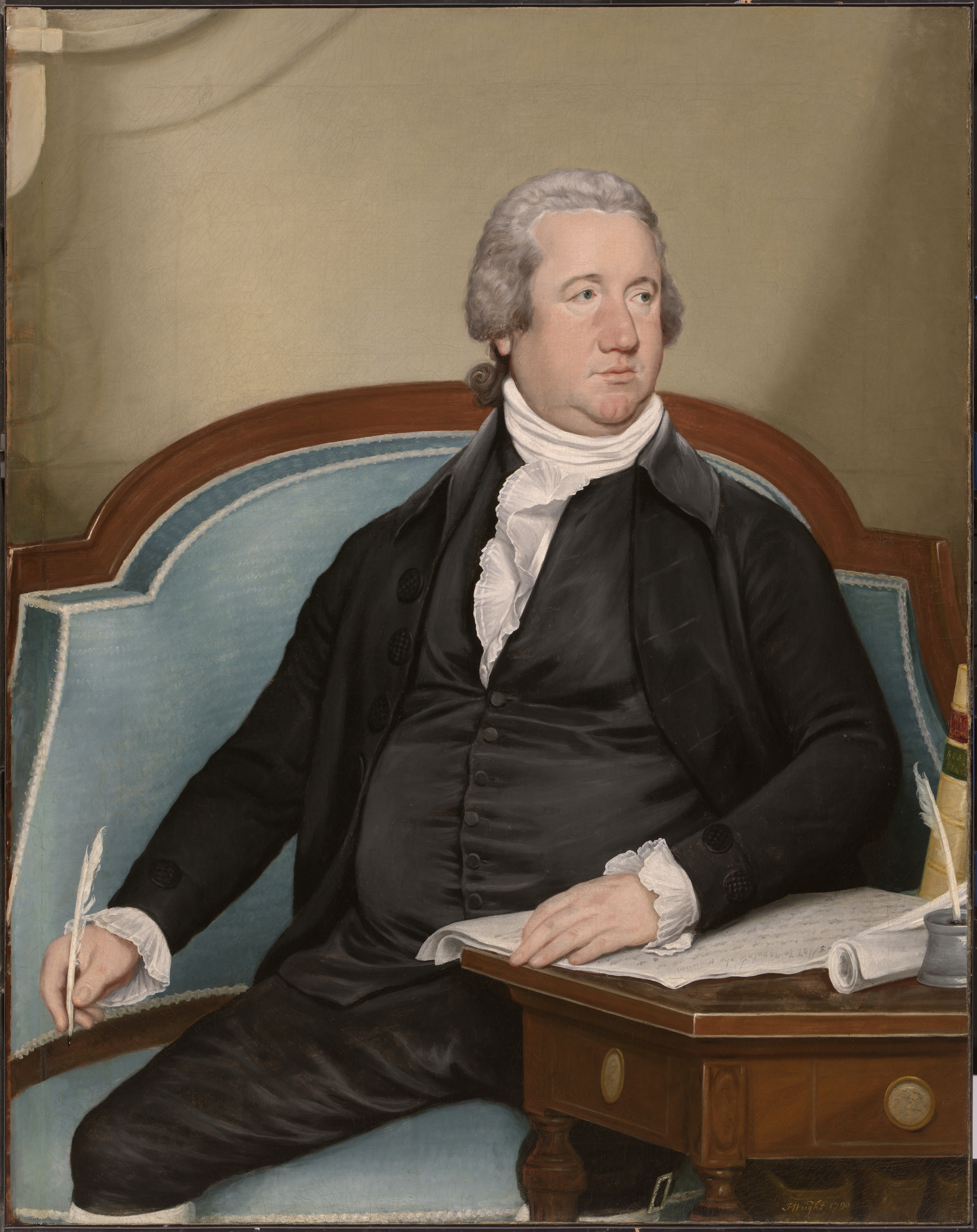
Frederick Muhlenberg

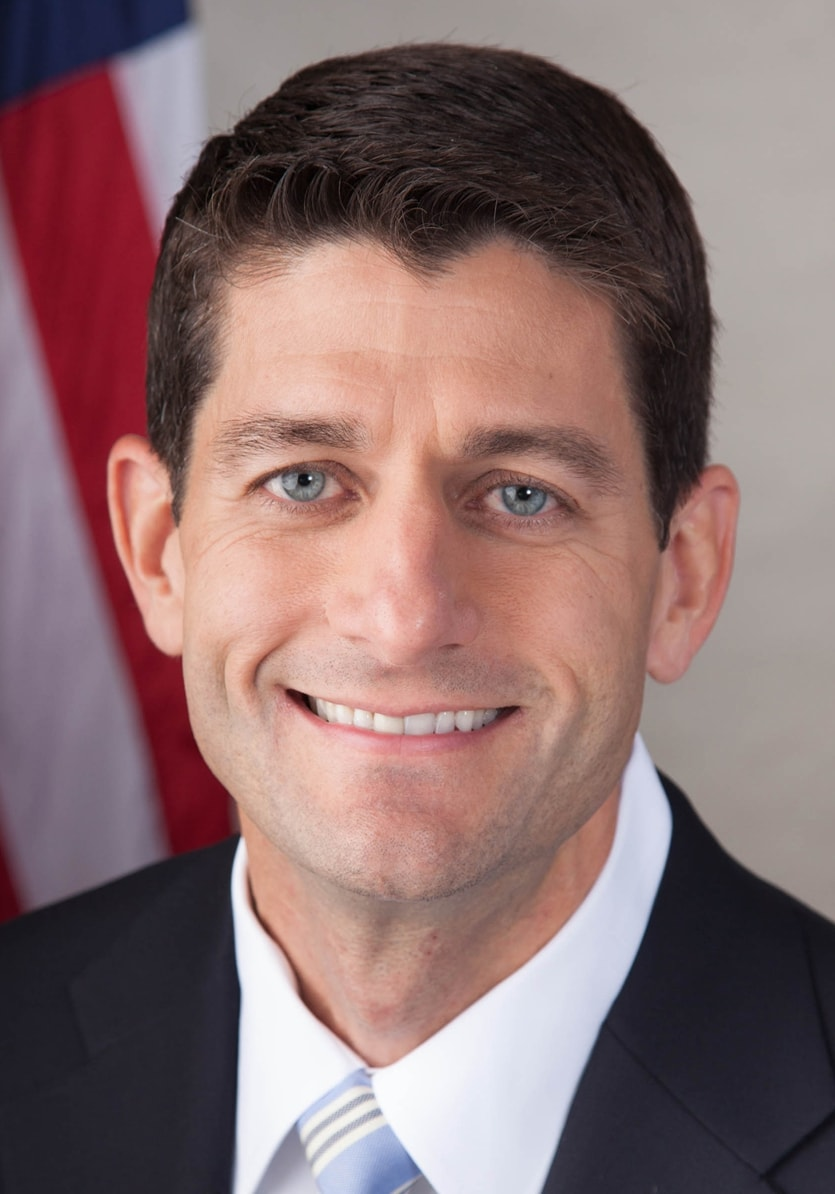
Paul Ryan

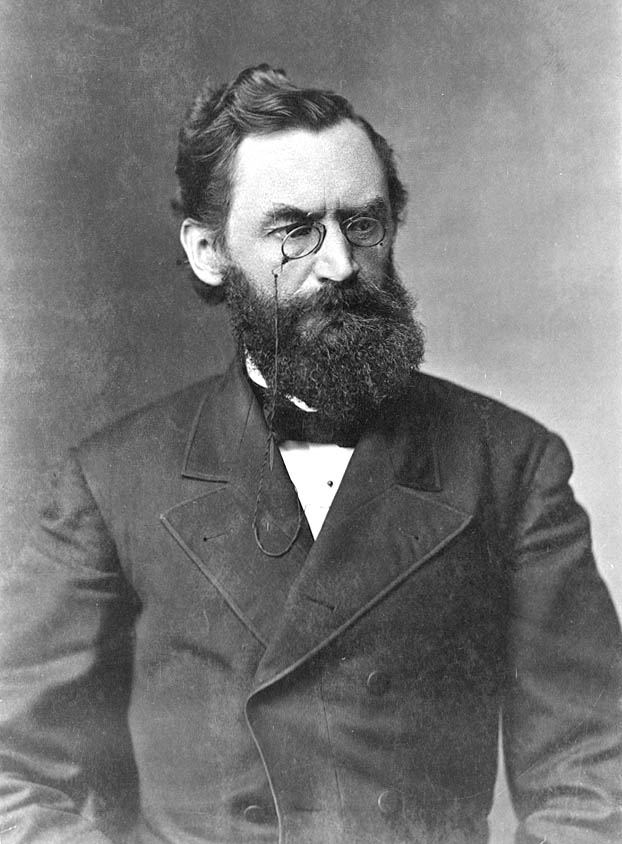
Carl Schurz

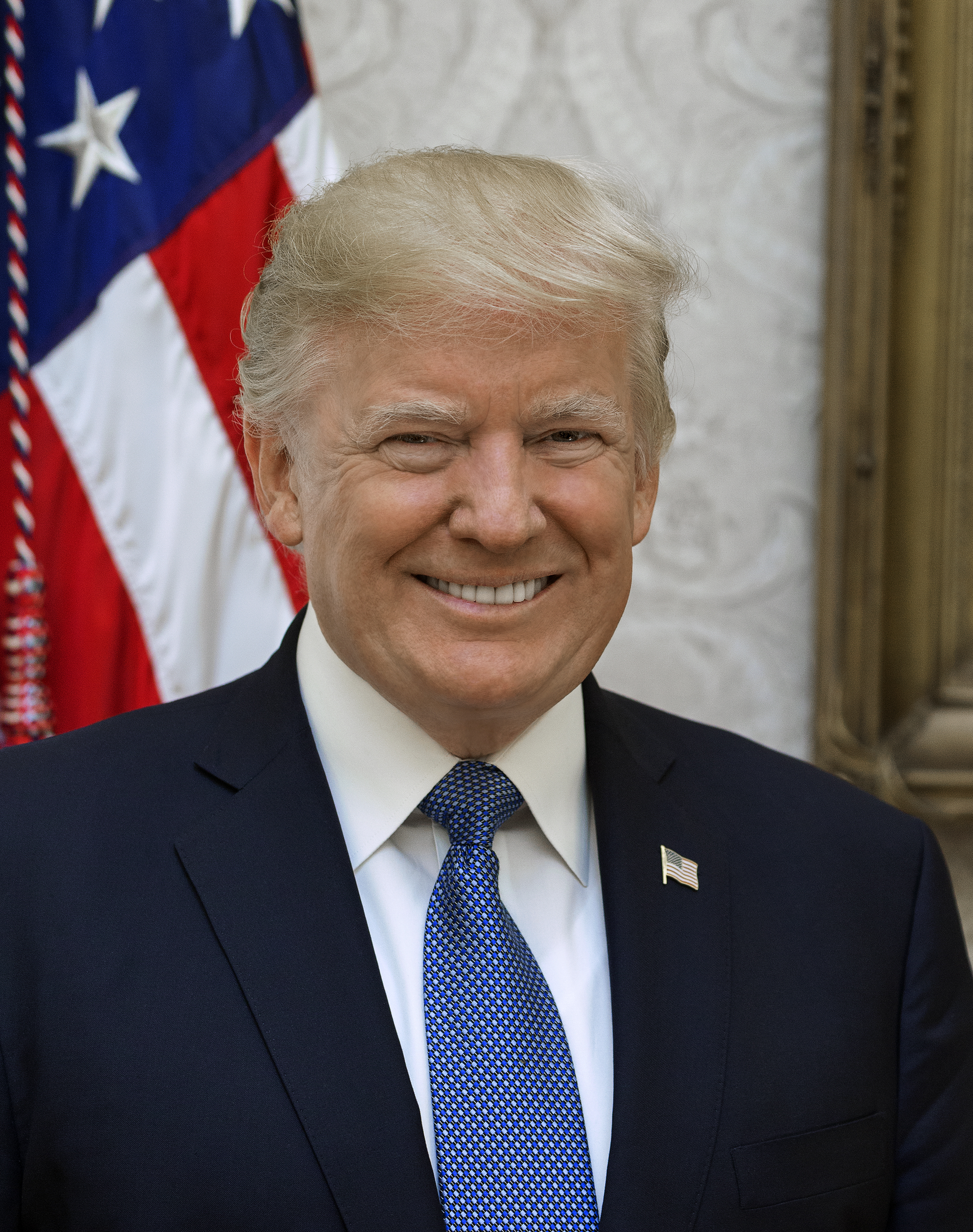
Donald Trump

- Wilhelm Albers – Wisconsin State Assemblyman, 1883
- Moses Alexander – 11th governor of Idaho, 1915–1919, 19th and 21st Mayor of Boise, Idaho, 1897–1899, 1901–1903
- John Peter Altgeld – former Union troop, 20th governor of Illinois governor (1893–1897) and leading figure of the Progressive Era movement
- Adam Apple – Wisconsin State Assemblyman, 1882–1889, Wisconsin State Senator, 1891–1895
- Henry M. Arens – 26th Lieutenant Governor of Minnesota, former Farmer-Labor member of the United States House of Representatives from Minnesota, former Minnesota state senator, former Minnesota state representative
- Max Bachhuber – Wisconsin State Assemblyman, 1860–1861, 1864–1865, 1875–1876
- Edward L. Bader – politician who served as mayor of Atlantic City, New Jersey
- William B. Bader – Assistant Secretary of State for Educational and Cultural Affairs 1999–2001
- Gerhard Adolph Bading – physician, politician, and diplomat
- Simon Bamberger – 4th Governor of Utah
- Charles Augustus Barnitz – Anti-Masonic member of the United States House of Representatives for Pennsylvania's 11th congressional district from 1833 to 1835
- Richard Bartholdt – former Republican member of the United States House of Representatives for Missouri's 10th congressional district from 1893 to 1915
- Charles Barwig – former Democratic member of the United States House of Representatives for Wisconsin's 2nd congressional district
- Martin Baum – former mayor of Cincinnati, fought with General Anthony Wayne at the Battle of Fallen Timbers
- Paul Bechtner – newspaper editor of Abendpost, manufacturer, and Wisconsin State Assembly politician
- Moritz Becker – Wisconsin State Assemblyman, 1872–1874
- Henry C. Berghoff – mayor of Fort Wayne, Indiana, Cofounder of the Herman J. Berghoff Brewing Company, lawyer, and businessman
- Richard Blumenthal – United States Senator from Connecticut since 2011
- W. Michael Blumenthal – former U.S. Secretary of the Treasury and Deputy Assistant Secretary of State for Economic and Business Affairs
- John Bohn – mayor of Milwaukee, Wisconsin, from 1942 to 1948
- Philip Becker – mayor of Buffalo, New York, 1876–1877 and 1886–1889
- Julius Bodenstab – Wisconsin State Assemblyman, 1873–1875
- Jacob Bodden – Wisconsin State Assemblyman, 1861–1862, 1866–1867, 1874–1875, Dodge County, Wisconsin Board of Supervisors Chairman, 1874–1875
- Rudy Boschwitz – U.S. ambassador to the UNCHR, 2005–2006, U.S. Senator from Minnesota, 1978–1991, Chair of the National Republican Senatorial Committee, 1987–1989
- Lorenzo Brentano – former Republican member of the United States House of Representatives for Illinois
- George H. Brickner – former Democratic member of the United States House of Representatives for Wisconsin, Village President of Sheboygan Falls, Wisconsin
- Edward Breitung – former Republican member of the United States House of Representatives for Michigan's 11th congressional district
- Martin Grove Brumbaugh – Pennsylvania's 25th governor (Republican)
- Charles F. Buck – former Democratic Member of the United States House of Representatives for Louisiana's 2nd District
- Henry Burk – former Republican member of the United States House of Representatives from Pennsylvania
- Charles P. Clever – former Democratic delegate to the United States House of Representatives for the New Mexico Territory's at-large congressional district
- Benjamin Williams Crowninshield – 5th United States Secretary of Navy (1815–1818), and member of the U.S. House of Representatives from Massachusett's 2nd district (1823–1832)
- Jacob Crowninshield – member of the U.S. House of Representatives from Massachusett's 2nd district (1803–1808)
- William Q. Dallmeyer – Missouri politician
- Thomas Dixon Jr. – politician, lawyer
- William J. Diehl – served as mayor of Pittsburgh, 1899–1901, a thirty-third degree mason
- George Anthony Dondero – U.S. representative from Michigan
- Gerhard Anton (Anthony) Eickhoff – journalist, editor, author, lawyer, United States Congress representative of New York City, United States Treasury auditor and New York City Fire Commissioner
- Gustavus Finkelnburg – former Judge of the United States District Court for the Eastern District of Missouri (1905–1907), former Republican and Liberal Republican member of the United States House of Representatives from Missouri's 2nd congressional district (1869–1873)
- Jacob H. Gallinger (1837–1918), President pro tempore of the U.S. Senate, 1912–1913, U.S. Senator from New Hampshire, 1891–1918, U.S. Congressman from New Hampshire, 1885–1889, New Hampshire State Senator, 1878–1880) New Hampshire State Representative, 1872–1873)
- Richard Friske – former Republican member of the Michigan House of Representatives
- Timothy Geithner – U.S. Secretary of the Treasury
- Bernard J. Gehrmann – former Progressive member of the United States House of Representatives from Wisconsin, former Wisconsin state senator, former Wisconsin state assemblyman
- William Goebel – controversial politician who served as governor of Kentucky for a few days in 1900 before being assassinated
- Richard W. Guenther – 19th-century politician and pharmacist from Wisconsin
- Charles Godfrey Gunther – Mayor of New York, 1864–1866
- Paul Grottkau – socialist political activist and newspaper publisher
- Michael Hahn – 19th Governor of Louisiana (1864–1865), member of the U.S. House of Representatives for Louisiana's 2nd district (1863, 1885–1886)
- Louis F. Haffen – two-time borough president for Bronx, New York, 1898–1909
- R. Phillip Haire – North Carolina State Representative
- John Paul Hammerschmidt – served for 13 terms in the United States House of Representatives from Arkansas
- William Havemeyer – mayor of New York City (1845–1846, 1848–1849, and 1873–1874)
- John Hay – statesman and diplomat, private secretary to Abraham Lincoln, served under William McKinley and Theodore Roosevelt
- Max W. Heck – politician and jurist
- Julius Heil – 30th governor of Wisconsin, 1939–1943
- William Heilman – former U.S. congressman from Indiana, Indiana state senator, and Indiana state representative
- H. Robert Heller – governor of the Federal Reserve System, 1986–1989 and president of Visa Inc.
- Theodor Rudolph Hertzberg – Texas State Senator, 1870–1871
- Daniel Hiester (1747–1804) U.S. congressman
- Gabriel Hiester (1749–1824) Pennsylvania political leader
- Isaac Ellmaker Hiester (1824–1871) U.S. congressman
- John Hiester (1745–1821) U.S. congressman
- Joseph Hiester (1752–1832) U.S. congressman and governor of Pennsylvania
- Daniel Hiester the younger (1774–1834) U.S. congressman
- William Hiester (1790–1853) US congressman
- William Muhlenberg Hiester – (1818–1878) political and military leader in the Commonwealth of Pennsylvania
- Frederick A. Hihn – California State Assemblyman, 1869–1870
- Gustav A. Hoff (1852–1930) – German-born American politician and businessman active in Arizona Territory
- Franz Hübschmann – physician and political leader in Milwaukee, Wisconsin
- Darrell Issa – U.S. representative for California's 48th congressional district
- Vera Katz – 45th mayor of Portland, Oregon
- Henry Kissinger – former Secretary of State
- John C. Koch – Republican politician who served two terms as mayor of Milwaukee, Wisconsin
- Matt Koehl – leader of the American Nazi Party
- Gustav Koerner – lieutenant governor of Illinois, 1853–1857, U.S. ambassador to Spain, and one of the original Dreissiger
- John Hans Krebs – former U.S. representative for California's 17th congressional district
- Otto Krueger – former U.S. Representative for North Dakota's at-large congressional district, former North Dakota Insurance Commissioner, former North Dakota State Treasurer
- Ferdinand Kuehn – Milwaukee politician
- Louis Kuehnle – politician; considered a pioneer in the growing resort town of Atlantic City in the late 1880s
- Herman Lehlbach – U.S. Representative for New Jersey's 6th congressional district, 1885–1891
- Charles Lieb – U.S. Representative for Indiana's 1st congressional district, 1913–1917, Indiana State Representative
- Oscar Marx – mayor of Detroit from 1913 to 1918
- Christopher Gustavus Memminger – first Confederate States Secretary of the Treasury, 1861–1864
- Baron Otfried Hans von Meusebach – Prussian bureaucrat, later an American farmer, politician, and member of the Texas Senate
- Leopold Morse – U.S. Representative from Massachusetts
- Frederick Muhlenberg – minister and politician who was the first Speaker of the United States House of Representatives
- Peter Muhlenberg – clergyman, soldier and politician of the Colonial, Revolutionary, and Post-Revolutionary eras in Pennsylvania
- Karl E. Mundt – U.S. senator and congressman
- Charles Henry Nimitz – Texas State Representative, 1890–1892
- Paul Henry Nitze – Presidential Medal of Freedom recipient
- Henry Paulson – U.S. Secretary of the Treasury
- William C. Rauschenberger – Republican politician who served as mayor of Milwaukee, Wisconsin
- Luke Ravenstahl – Pittsburgh mayor
- Denny Rehberg – lieutenant governor of Montana, 1991–1997 and U.S. representative for Montana's at-large congressional district, 2001–2013
- William Richert – 40th Mayor of Detroit, 1897
- Joseph Ritner – eighth governor of the commonwealth of Pennsylvania, elected as a member of the Anti-Masonic Party
- William E. Rodriguez (1879–1970) – socialist politician and lawyer; first Hispanic elected to the Chicago City Council
- Edward Salomon – 8th governor of Wisconsin, 1862–1864
- Edward S. Salomon – Union brigadier general in the Civil War, later became governor of Washington Territory and a California legislator
- Harry Sauthoff – lawyer, Wisconsin State Senator, also served in the United States House of Representatives
- Solomon Scheu – mayor of Buffalo, New York, in office 1878–1880
- Gustav Schleicher – U.S. Representative from Texas, serving briefly in Texas legislature and veteran of the Confederate Army
- Erich Schmidt – Texas State Representative, 1873–1876
- Gustav A. Schneebeli – former member of the United States House of Representatives from the state of Pennsylvania
- Frederick A. Schroeder – industrialist and politician
- Carl Schurz – former U.S. Secretary of the Interior, U.S. senator from Missouri, U.S. Minister to Spain, and Union Army general in the American Civil War
- Emil Seidel – mayor of Milwaukee, 1910–1912 and the vice presidential candidate for the Socialist Party of America in the 1912 presidential election
- Barney Semmelman – Mississippi State Representative, 1916–1917
- John Andrew Shulze – Pennsylvania political leader and 6th governor of Pennsylvania
- August Siemering – writer, political leader and Forty-Eighter
- Joseph Simon – 36th Mayor of Portland, Oregon, 1909–1911, U.S. Senator from Oregon, 1989–1903, President of the Oregon Senate, 1889–1892, 1895–1898, Oregon State Senator, 1880–1898
- Jackie Speier – member of the United States House of Representatives for California's 12th and 14th districts (2008–2023)
- Harold Stassen – 25th governor of Minnesota, 1939–1943
- Isidor Straus – member of the United States House of Representatives for New York's 15th district (1894–1895)
- Oscar Straus – 3rd U.S. Secretary of Commerce and Labor, former U.S. Ambassador to the Ottoman Empire
- Edward Stettinius Jr. – U.S. Secretary of State 1944–1945
- John A. Treutlen – 9th governor of Georgia, 1777–1778
- Jesse Ventura – 38th governor of Minnesota, 1999–2003
- Paul Volcker – 12th chairman of the Federal Reserve, 1979–1987
- Mel Vogel – California State Assemblyman, 1905–1909
- Robert F. Wagner – U.S. Senator from New York, 1927–1949, Justice of the New York Supreme Court, 1915–1926, Acting Lieutenant Governor of New York, 1913–1914, New York State Senator, 1909–1918, New York State Assemblyman, 1905, 1907–1908
- Emil Wallber – mayor of Milwaukee from 1884 to 1888, during the Great Labor Strike of 1886
- Carl M. Weideman, naval officer, politician (U.S. House of Representatives 1933–1935) and judge
- Dethloff Willrodt – Texas State Representative, 1899–1901
- Edward Wunderly – member of the 1st Wisconsin Legislature elected in 1848
- Carl Zeidler – mayor of Milwaukee, Wisconsin, from 1940 to 1942
- Frank Zeidler – mayor of Milwaukee, Wisconsin, serving three terms from April 20, 1948, to April 18, 1960
- Robert Zoellick – eleventh president of the World Bank, former United States Deputy Secretary of state and United States Trade Representative

== Religious ==
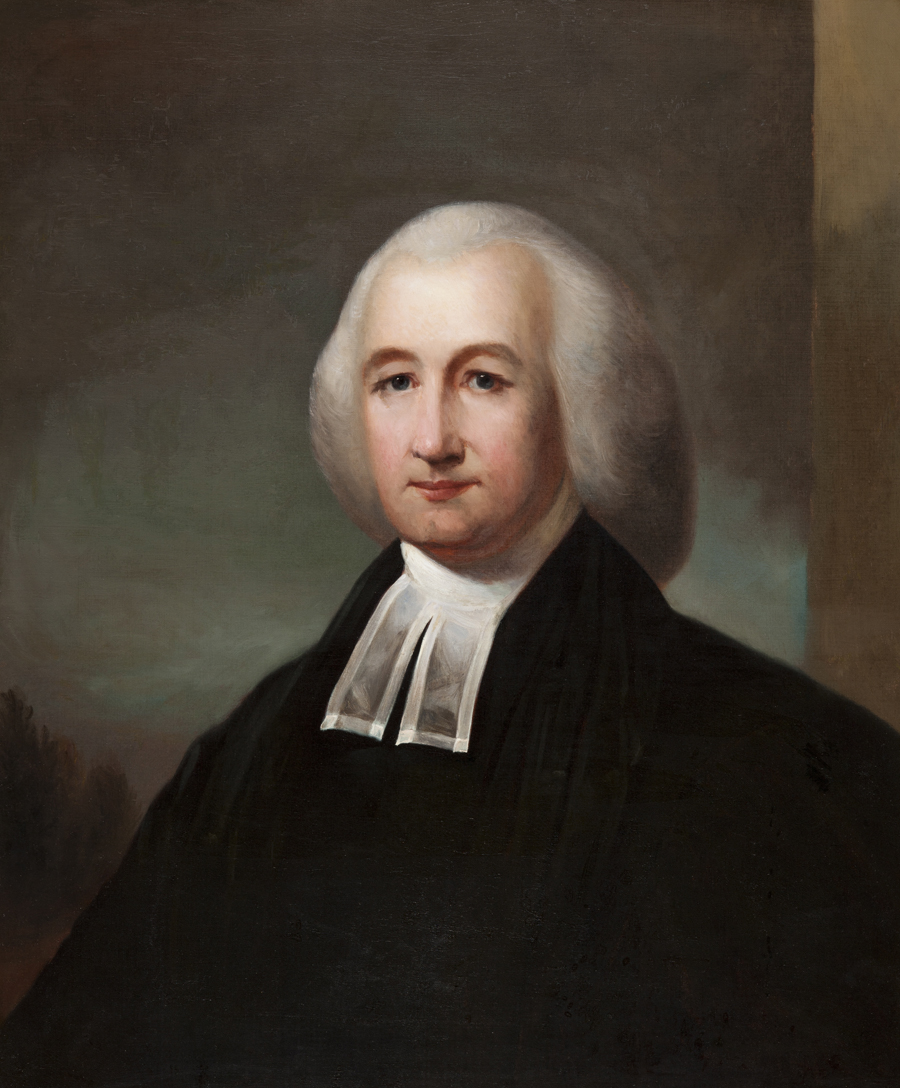
Henry Muhlenberg

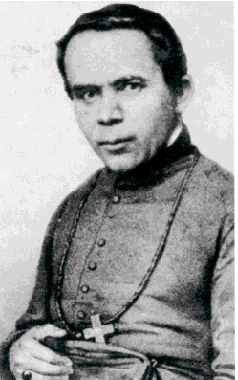
St. John Neumann

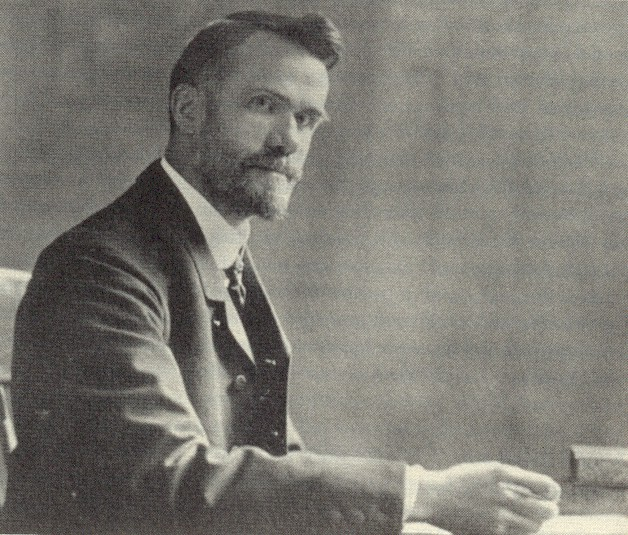
Walter Rauschenbusch

- Joseph Breuer – leader of the Orthodox Jewish community of Washington Heights, Manhattan; very well known for his involvement in setting up an Orthodox Jewish infrastructure in post-World War II America
- Conrad Beissel – religious leader who in 1732 founded the Ephrata Community in Pennsylvania
- Raymond Philip Etteldorf – Roman Catholic Archbishop and author
- George J. Geis – Baptist missionary in Kachin State, Burma
- Robert Graetz – Lutheran clergyman
- Barbara Heck – 1768 – founder of the first Methodist church in New York
- Joseph J. Himmel – Catholic priest and member of the Society of Jesus, missionary and retreat master, and president of Gonzaga College and Georgetown University in Washington, D.C.
- Samuel Hirsch – philosopher and rabbi
- Johannes Kelpius – pietist, mystic, musician, and writer
- Kathryn Kuhlman – 20th-century faith healer and Pentecostal arm of Protestant Christianity
- Benjamin Kurtz – Lutheran pastor and theologian
- Barbara Heinemann Landmann – spiritual leader of the Amana Colonies
- Alexander Mack – Germantown, Pennsylvania New World religious leader
- Christian Metz – inspirationalist
- Albert Gregory Meyer – Roman Catholic Archbishop of Chicago
- Henry K. Moeller – Roman Catholic Archbishop of Cincinnati
- John Gottlieb Morris – Lutheran minister who played an influential role in the evolution of the Lutheran church in America
- Heinrich Melchior Muhlenberg – Lutheran clergyman
- St. John Neumann – Bishop of Philadelphia (1852–60) and the first American bishop to be canonized
- Reinhold Niebuhr – Protestant theologian best known for his work relating the Christian faith to the realities of modern politics and diplomacy
- William Passavant – Lutheran minister noted for bringing the Lutheran Deaconess movement to the United States
- George Rapp – founder of the religious sect called Harmonists, Harmonites, Rappites, or the Harmony Society
- Augustus Rauschenbusch – clergyman
- Walter Rauschenbusch – theologian and Baptist pastor who taught at the Rochester Theological Seminary
- August Karl Reischauer – Presbyterian missionary in Japan
- Joseph Cardinal Ritter – Roman Catholic Archbishop and Cardinal of the Church, desegregated schools in his two archdioceses in the mid-1940s
- George Erik Rupp – educator and theologian, the former president of Rice University and later of Columbia University, and president of the International Rescue Committee
- Francis Xavier Seelos – Roman Catholic missionary priest beatified in 2000
- Joseph Strub – founder of what is today Duquesne University, which was called the Pittsburgh Catholic College of the Holy Ghost until 1911
- Billy Sunday – evangelist
- Paul Tillich – Protestant theologian and Christian existentialist philosopher
- C. F. W. Walther – Lutheran clergyman, professor, seminary president, editor, and first president of the Lutheran Church–Missouri Synod
- Count Nicholas Ludwig von Zinzendorf – founded the town of Bethlehem, Pennsylvania, where his daughter Benigna organized the school that would become Moravian College
- Dieter F. Uchtdorf – apostle and current second counselor in the First Presidency within the Church of Jesus Christ of Latter-day Saints

== Scientists and inventors ==
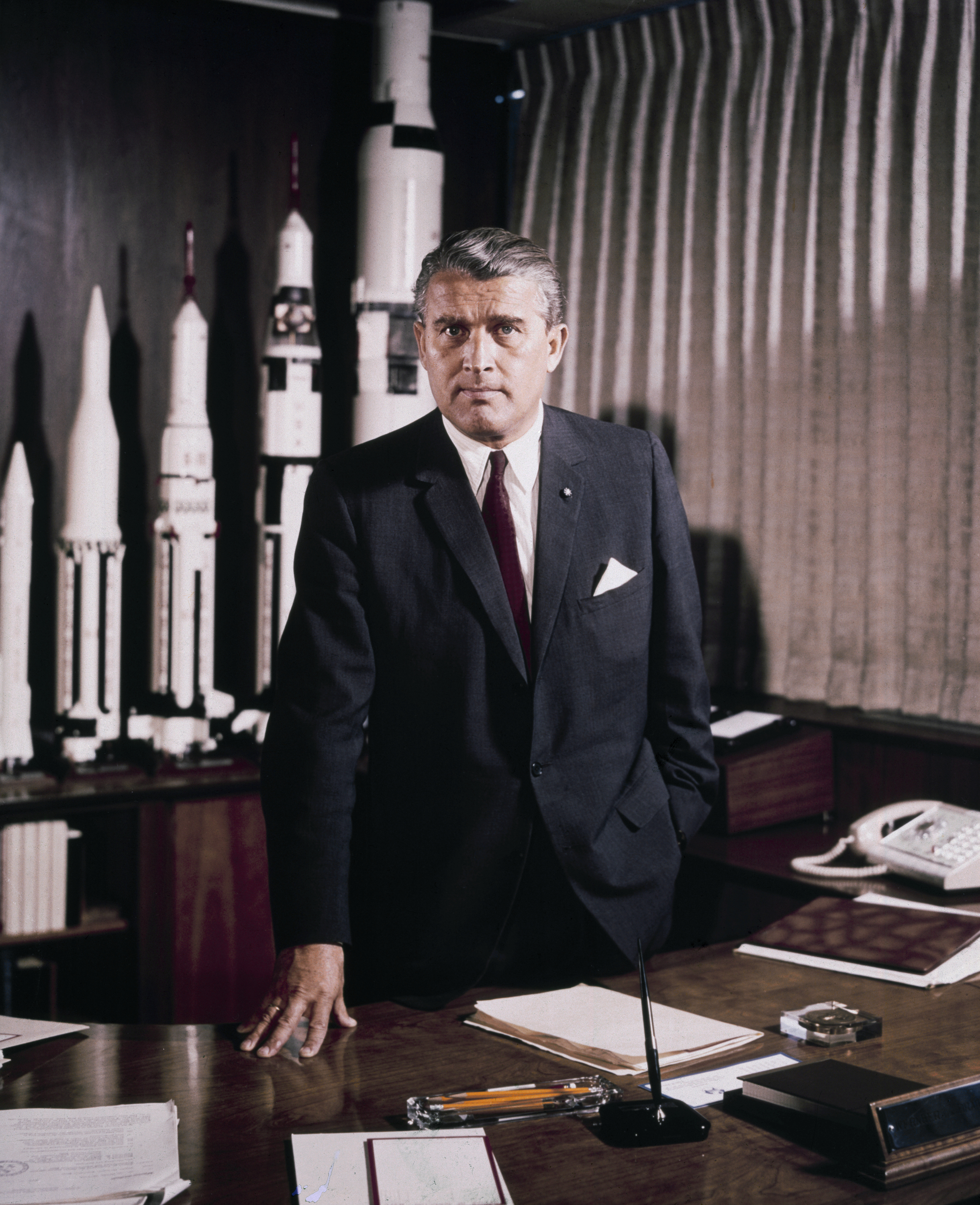
Wernher von Braun

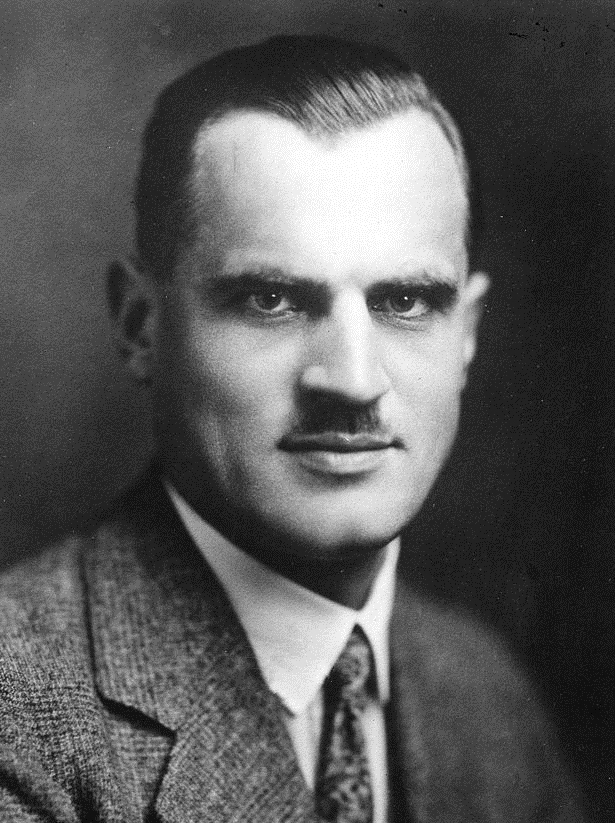
Arthur Compton

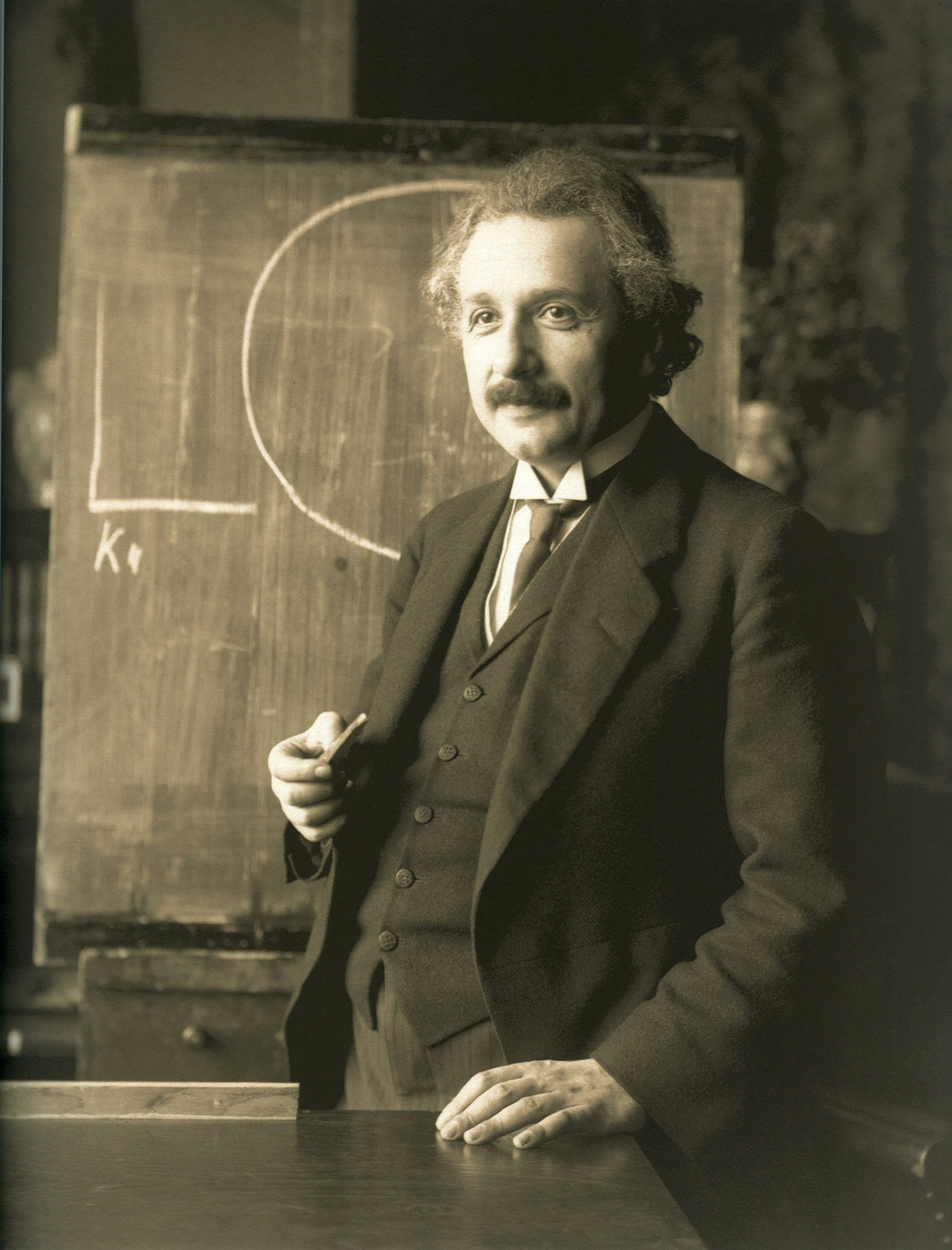
Albert Einstein

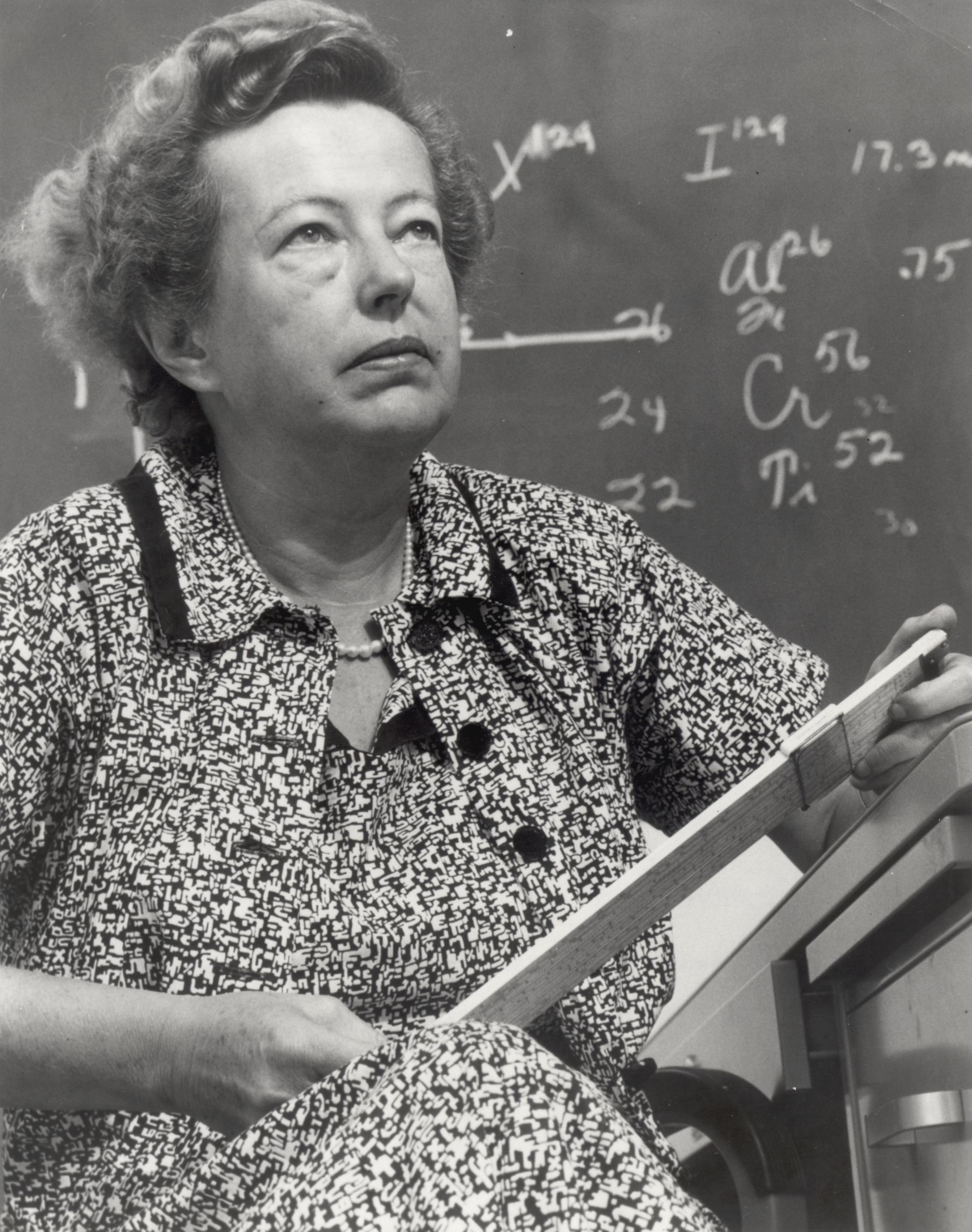
Maria Goeppert Mayer

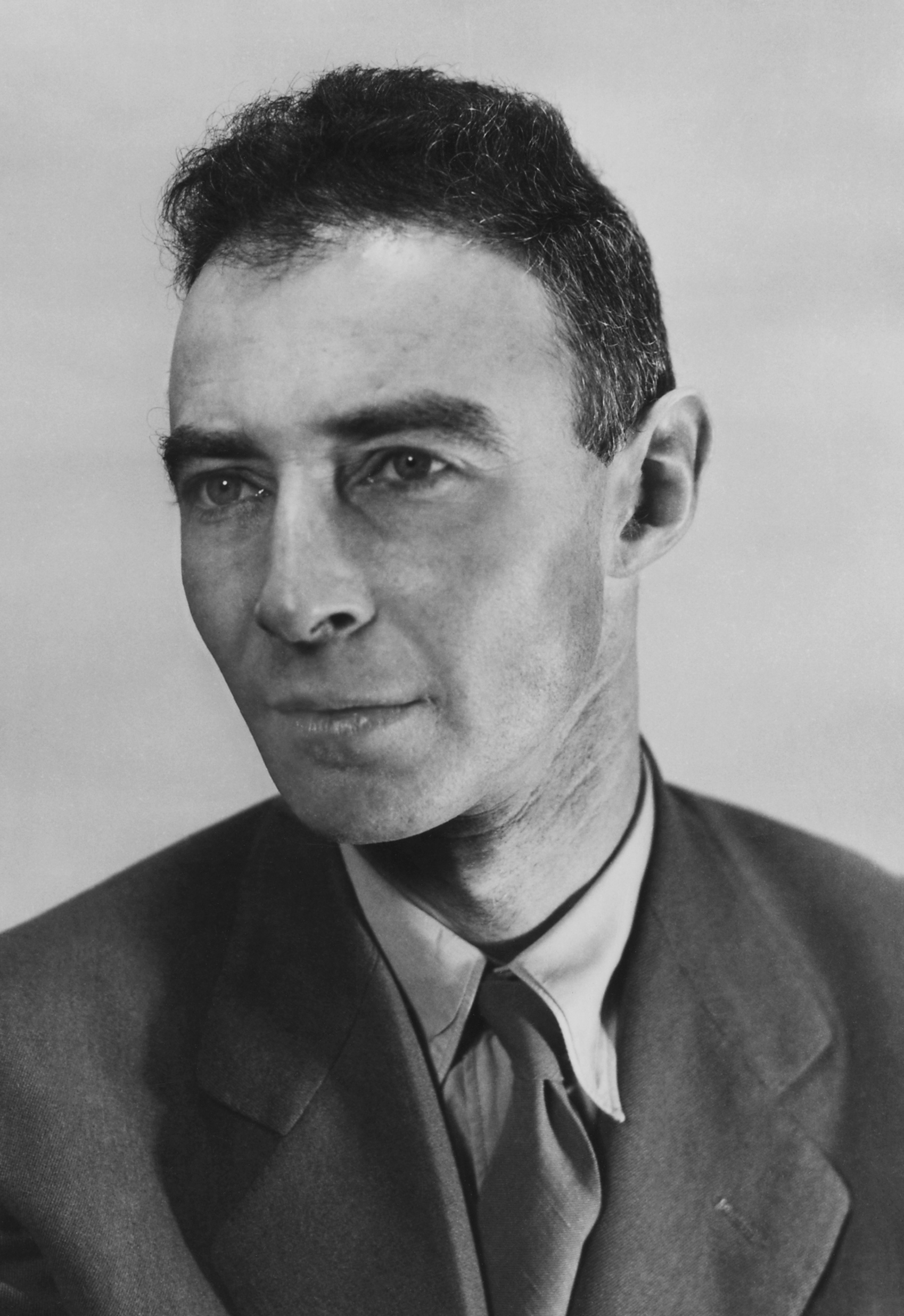
J. Robert Oppenheimer

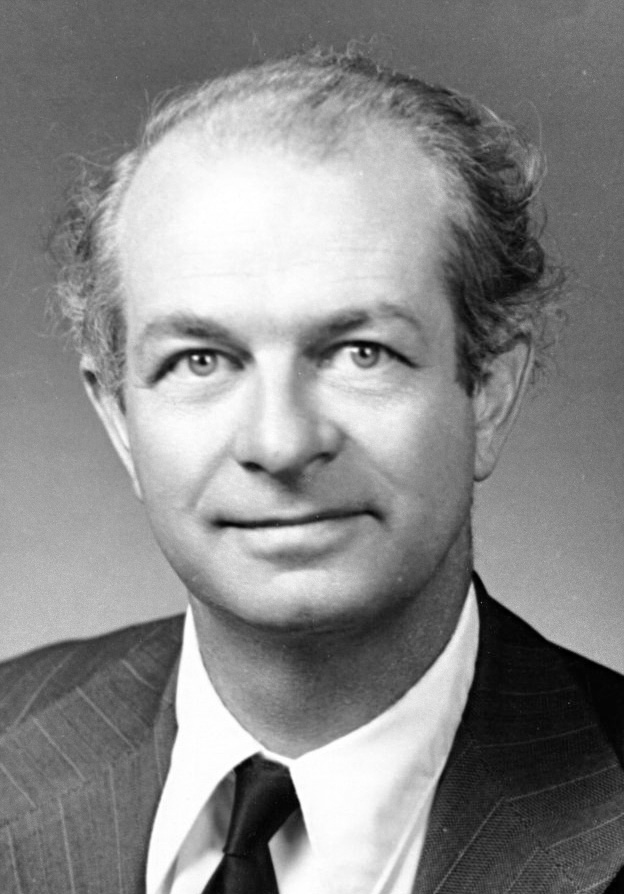
Linus Pauling

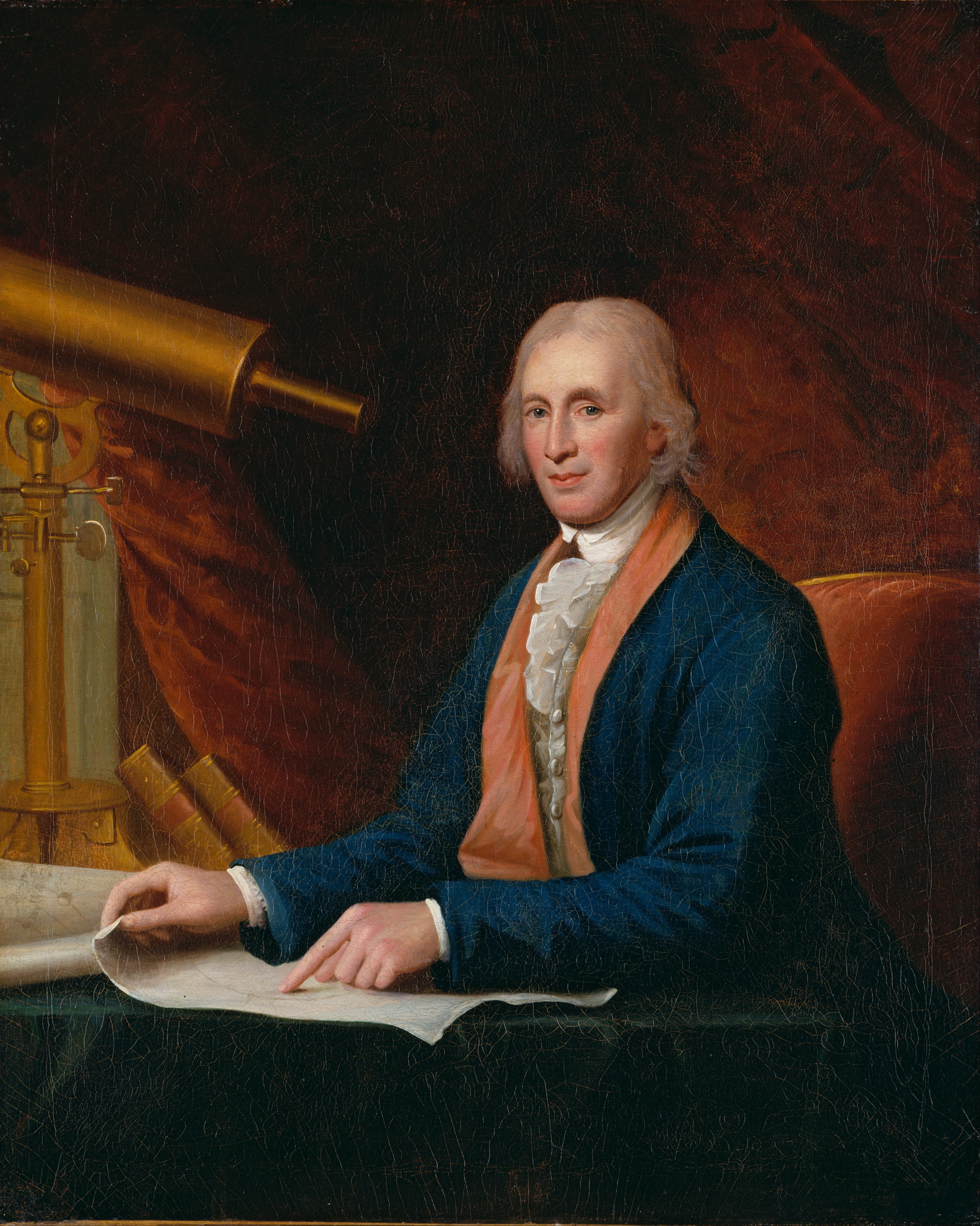
David Rittenhouse

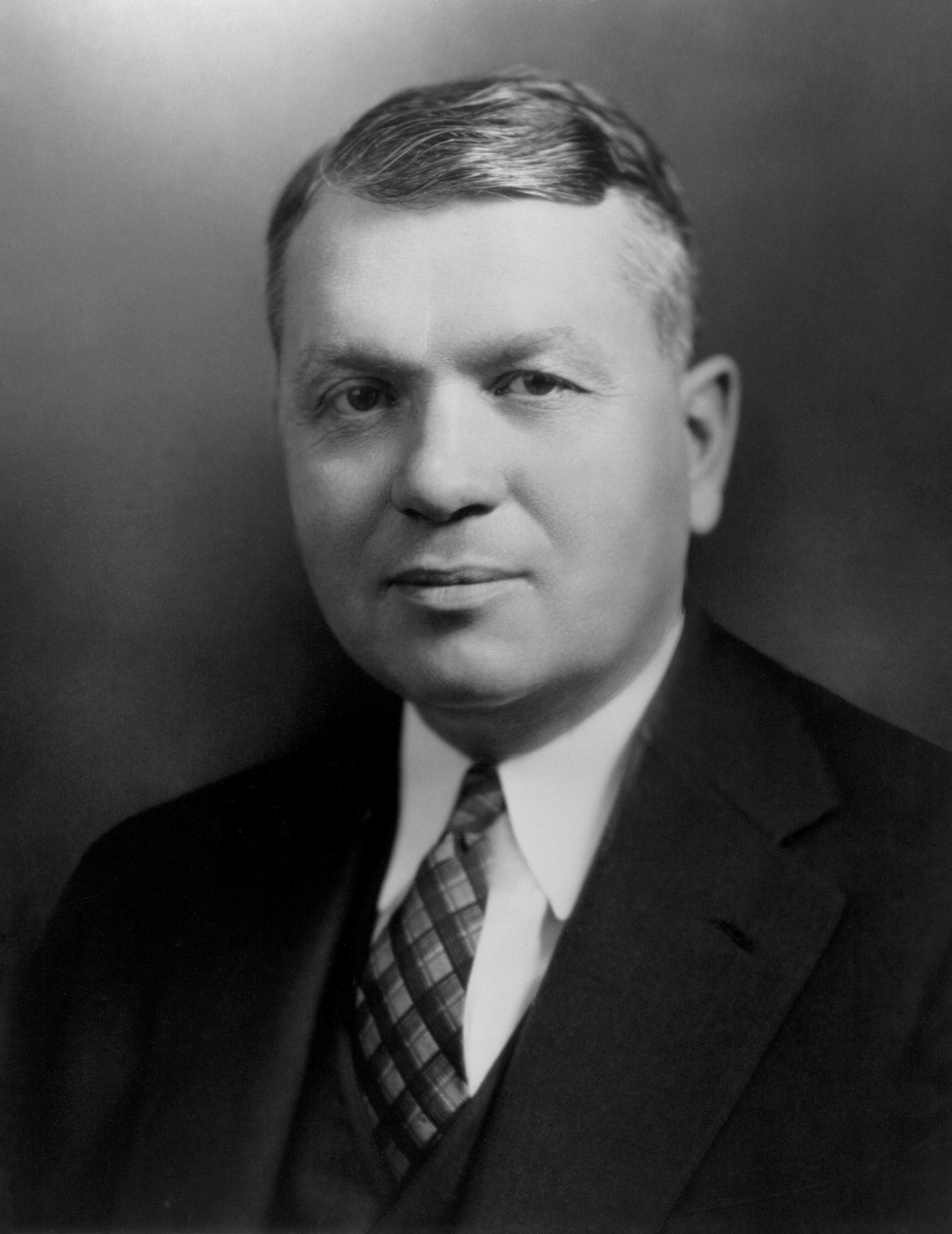
Harold Urey

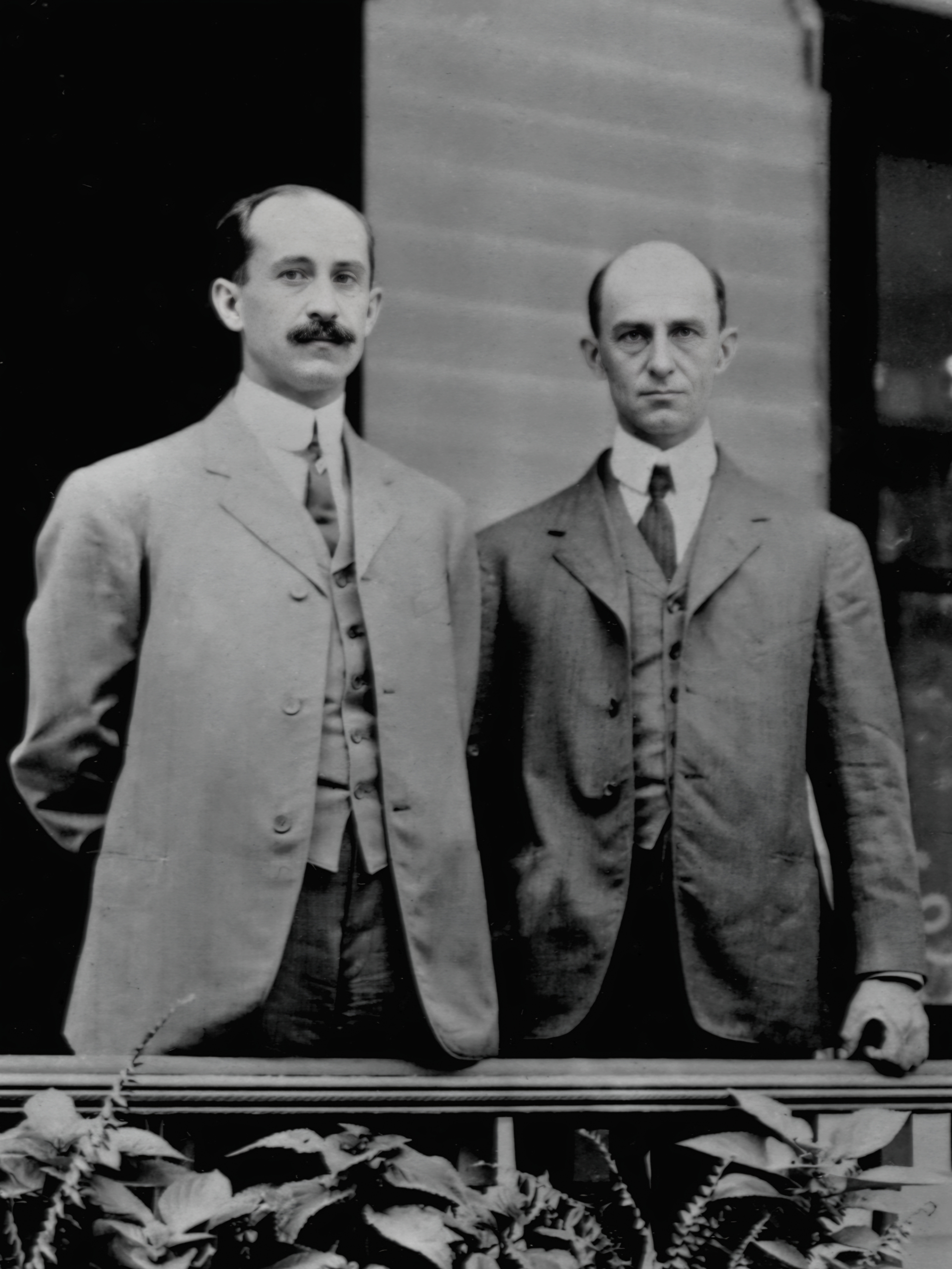
Orville and Wilbur Wright

- John Jacob Abel – biochemist and pharmacologist
- Howard H. Aiken – physicist and computing pioneer
- David Alter – inventor, physicist and doctor
- Reinhold Aman – chemical engineer and publisher of Maledicta
- Rudolf Arnheim – author, art and film theorist, and perceptual psychologist; learned Gestalt psychology from studying under Max Wertheimer and Wolfgang Köhler at the University of Berlin and applied it to art
- Walter Baade – astronomer
- Earl W. Bascom – inventor of rodeo equipment
- Arnold Beckman – chemist, inventor of the pH meter
- Max Bentele – pioneer in the field of jet aircraft turbines and mechanical engineering
- Elwyn Berlekamp – mathematician, known for his contributions to coding theory
- Hans Albrecht Bethe – nuclear physicist who won a Nobel Prize in physics for his work on the nuclear energy sources of stars (1967)
- Franz Boas – anthropologist and ethnologist best known for his work with the Kwakiutl Indians in British Columbia, Canada
- Karl Brandt – economist
- Walter Houser Brattain – physicist, co-inventor of the transistor
- Magnus von Braun – chemical engineer, Luftwaffe aviator, and rocket scientist at Peenemünde, the Mittelwerk, and after emigrating to the United States via Operation Paperclip, at Fort Bliss; brother of Wernher von Braun
- Wernher von Braun – rocket scientist, aerospace engineer, space architect
- Vint Cerf – internet pioneer, co-developer of TCP/IP
- Hermann Collitz – eminent German historical linguist and Indo-Europeanist
- Arthur Compton – physicist, discovered the Compton effect
- Donald J. Cram – chemist, co-recipient of the 1987 Nobel Prize in Chemistry
- Werner Dahm – NASA rocket scientist
- Kurt H. Debus – rocket engineer and NASA director
- Hans Georg Dehmelt – physicist
- Max Delbrück – biophysicist
- Krafft Arnold Ehricke – rocket-propulsion engineer
- Ernst R. G. Eckert – scientist
- Otto Eckstein – economist
- Albert Einstein – theoretical physicist, philosopher and author
- Douglas Engelbart – inventor, computer and Internet pioneer
- George Engelmann – botanist
- Katherine Esau – botanist
- Louis Fieser – organic chemist, inventor of napalm
- Paul Flory – Nobel Prize-winning chemist
- James Franck – physicist
- John Fritz – pioneer of iron and steel technology who has been referred to as the "Father of the U.S. Steel Industry"
- John Froelich – inventor of the first successful gasoline-powered tractor with forward and reverse drive
- Frieda Fromm-Reichmann – psychoanalyst, founded William Alanson White Institute
- Herbert Spencer Gasser – Nobel Prize-winning physiologist
- Ernst Geissler – NASA aerospace engineer
- William Paul Gerhard – sanitary engineer
- Lester Germer – physicist, known for the Davisson–Germer experiment
- Edward Glaeser – economist and Fred and Eleanor Glimp Professor of Economics at Harvard University
- James Glimm – mathematician, known for his work in mathematical analysis
- Heinrich Göbel – precision mechanic and inventor, who was long seen as an early pioneer who independently developed designs for an incandescent light bulb, though this claim is seen as unlikely today
- Kurt Gödel – logician, mathematician, and philosopher
- Maria Goeppert Mayer – Nobel Prize-winning physicist
- Martin Gruebele – biophysicist and Computational biologist, currently associated with many departments at University of Illinois at Urbana–Champaign
- Dietrich Gruen – timepiece or wristwatch maker; founded the Gruen Watch Company in Ohio
- Hans Ulrich Gumbrecht – literary theorist and professor at Stanford University
- Walter Haeussermann – NASA rocket scientist
- Hermann August Hagen – entomologist who specialised in Neuroptera and Odonata
- Richard S. Hamilton – mathematician, introduced Ricci flow
- Haldan Keffer Hartline – physiologist, co-recipient of the 1967 Nobel Prize in Physiology or Medicine
- Ewald Heer – aerospace engineer
- Michael Heidelberger – regarded as the father of modern immunology
- Philip Showalter Hench – Nobel Prize-winning physician, co-discovered Cortisone
- Holger Henke – political scientist
- Maurice Hilleman – microbiologist who developed more than 40 vaccines
- Herman Hollerith – inventor of tabulating machines
- Karen Horney – psychoanalyst
- David H. Hubel – Nobel Prize-winning neurophysiologist
- Charles F. Kettering – inventor, director of research for GM from 1920 to 1947
- Stephen Cole Kleene – mathematician and logician, pioneer of computability theory
- Heinrich Klüver – psychologist, largely credited with introducing Gestalt psychology to the United States in the early 20th century
- Siegfried Knemeyer – aviation technologist, civilian employee and consultant with the United States Air Force for over twenty years
- Donald Knuth – computer scientist
- Wolfgang Köhler – psychologist
- Frank Koester - engineer who worked on the New York City Subway and the design and construction of power stations
- Christopher C. Kraft Jr. – aerospace engineer, instrumental in establishing NASA's Mission Control Center
- Gene Kranz – aerospace engineer, flight director during Apollo 11 and Apollo 13
- Alfred Louis Kroeber – cultural anthropologist
- Thomas E. Kurtz – computer scientist, co-inventor of the BASIC programming language
- Polykarp Kusch – physicist
- Paul Lauterbur – chemist, co-recipient of the 2003 Nobel Prize in Physiology or Medicine
- Berthold Laufer – anthropologist, historical geographer
- Willy Ley – science writer and space advocate who helped popularise rocketry and spaceflight
- Jacques Loeb – biologist, Nobel Prize candidate
- Leo Loeb – biologist, pathologist
- John Mauchly – computer pioneer, co-designed the ENIAC
- John Mearsheimer – political scientist and international relations scholar
- Ottmar Mergenthaler – linotype inventor
- George Mueller – electrical engineer, headed the Office of Manned Space Flight from September 1963 until December 1969
- Hermann Joseph Muller – Nobel Prize-winning geneticist
- Hugo Münsterberg – psychologist, pioneered applied psychology
- Emmy Noether – mathematician
- Robert Oppenheimer – physicist and director of the Manhattan Project, also known as "The Father of the Atomic Bomb"
- Linus Carl Pauling – chemist, biochemist, chemical engineer, peace activist, author, and educator
- Walter Pitts – mathematician, logician, and neuroscientist; co-inventor of the McCulloch–Pitts neuron
- Jesco von Puttkamer – aerospace engineer, senior manager at NASA, and a pulp science fiction writer
- Norman Ramsey Jr. – Nobel Prize-winning physicist
- Eberhard Rees – rocketry pioneer, second director of NASA's Marshall Space Flight Center
- Charles Francis Richter – seismologist, inventor of the Richter magnitude scale
- David Rittenhouse – astronomer, inventor, and the first director of the United States Mint
- Eileen Rockefeller – founder and former president of the Institute for the Advancement of Health
- Gunther E. Rothenberg – military historian, professor at Purdue University and elsewhere
- Frank Schlesinger – astronomer
- John Robert Schrieffer – physicist, co-recipient of the 1972 Nobel Prize in Physics
- Theodore Schultz – Nobel Prize-winning economist
- Lewis David de Schweinitz – botanist and mycologist, "Father of American Mycology"
- Frederick Seitz – physicist, co-inventor of the Wigner-Seitz unit cell, which is an important concept in solid state physics
- Claude Shannon – mathematician, electrical engineer, and cryptographer known as the "father of information theory"
- Lloyd Shapley – mathematician, pioneer of game theory; introduced the Shapley value
- Walter A. Shewhart – physicist known for statistical process control and the Shewhart cycle
- Herbert A. Simon – political scientist
- Charles Proteus Steinmetz – electrical engineer, fostered development of alternating current
- Adam Steltzner – NASA engineer who works for the Jet Propulsion Laboratory (JPL), flight projects including Galileo, Cassini, Mars Pathfinder, Mars Exploration Rovers
- Joseph Strauss – structural engineer and designer, chief engineer of the Golden Gate Bridge
- Otto Stern – physicist and Nobel laureate, known for his studies of molecular beams
- Ernst Stuhlinger – atomic, electrical, and rocket scientist
- John Tate – mathematician, known for his work in algebraic number theory; 2010 Abel Prize recipient
- Henry Taube – Nobel Prize-winning chemist
- Clyde Tombaugh – astronomer, discovered Pluto
- Frederick Traugott Pursh – botanist
- Harold Urey – physical chemist, discovered deuterium
- Willard Van Orman Quine – logician and philosopher
- George Waldbott – physician, allergy and fluoride specialist
- Hellmuth Walter – engineer who pioneered research into rocket engines and gas turbines
- Kenneth Waltz – political scientist, outlined the theory of neorealism
- Michael Christopher Wendl – biomedical engineer and Human Genome Project scientist
- Günter Wendt – mechanical engineer noted for his work in the U.S. human spaceflight program
- Gustave Whitehead – aviation pioneer, built first motorized plane
- Eckard Wimmer – virologist, Distinguished Professor of molecular genetics and microbiology at Stony Brook University; known for the first chemical synthesis of a viral genome capable of infection and subsequent production of live viruses
- Louis Wirth – sociologist
- Caspar Wistar – physician and anatomist
- Wright brothers – inventors of the airplane
- Hans Zinsser – American bacteriologist, physician and author
- George Kingsley Zipf – linguist and philologist, known for Zipf's law
- Max August Zorn – algebraist, group theorist, and numerical analyst

== Sports ==
=== Baseball professionals ===
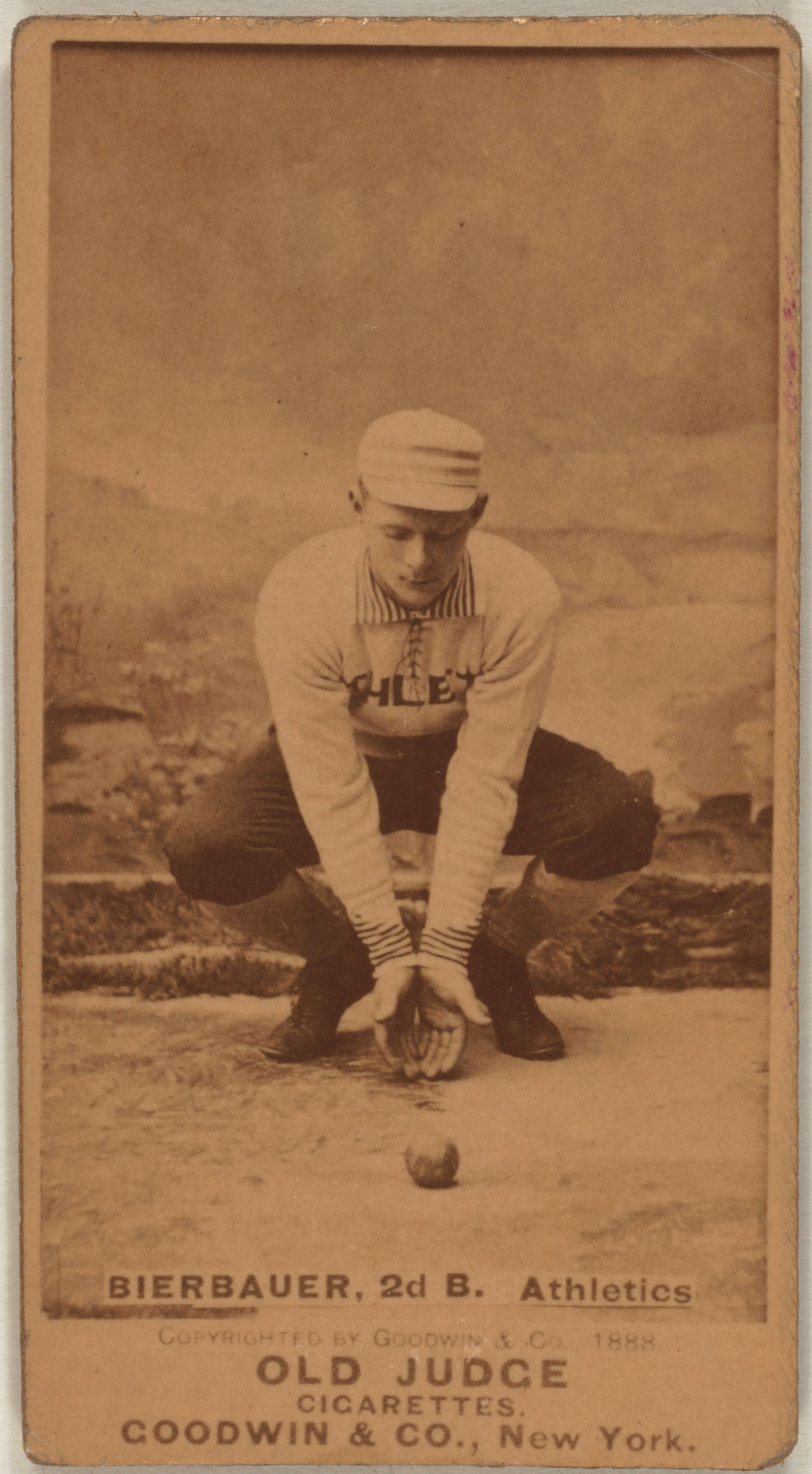
Lou Bierbauer

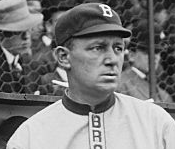
Bill Dahlen

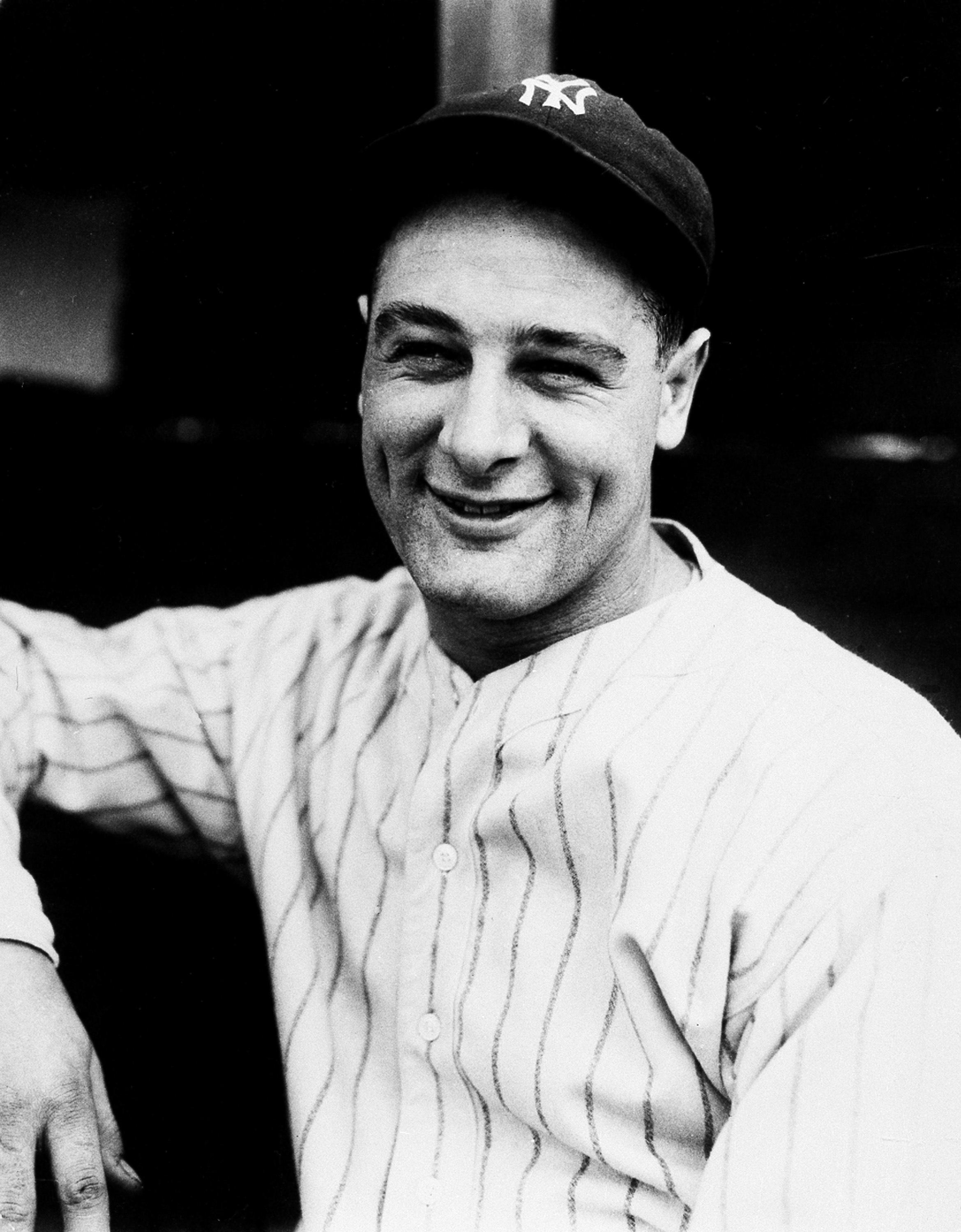
Lou Gehrig

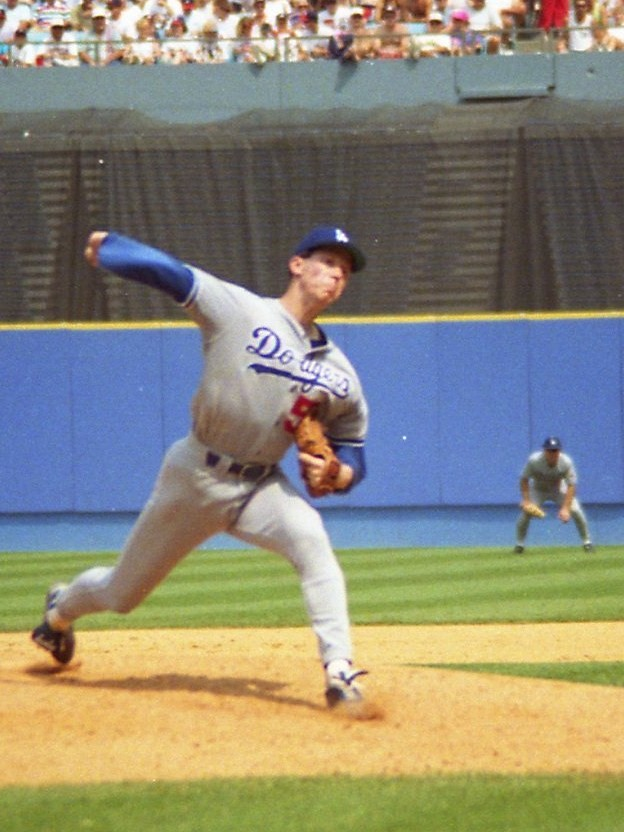
Orel Hershiser

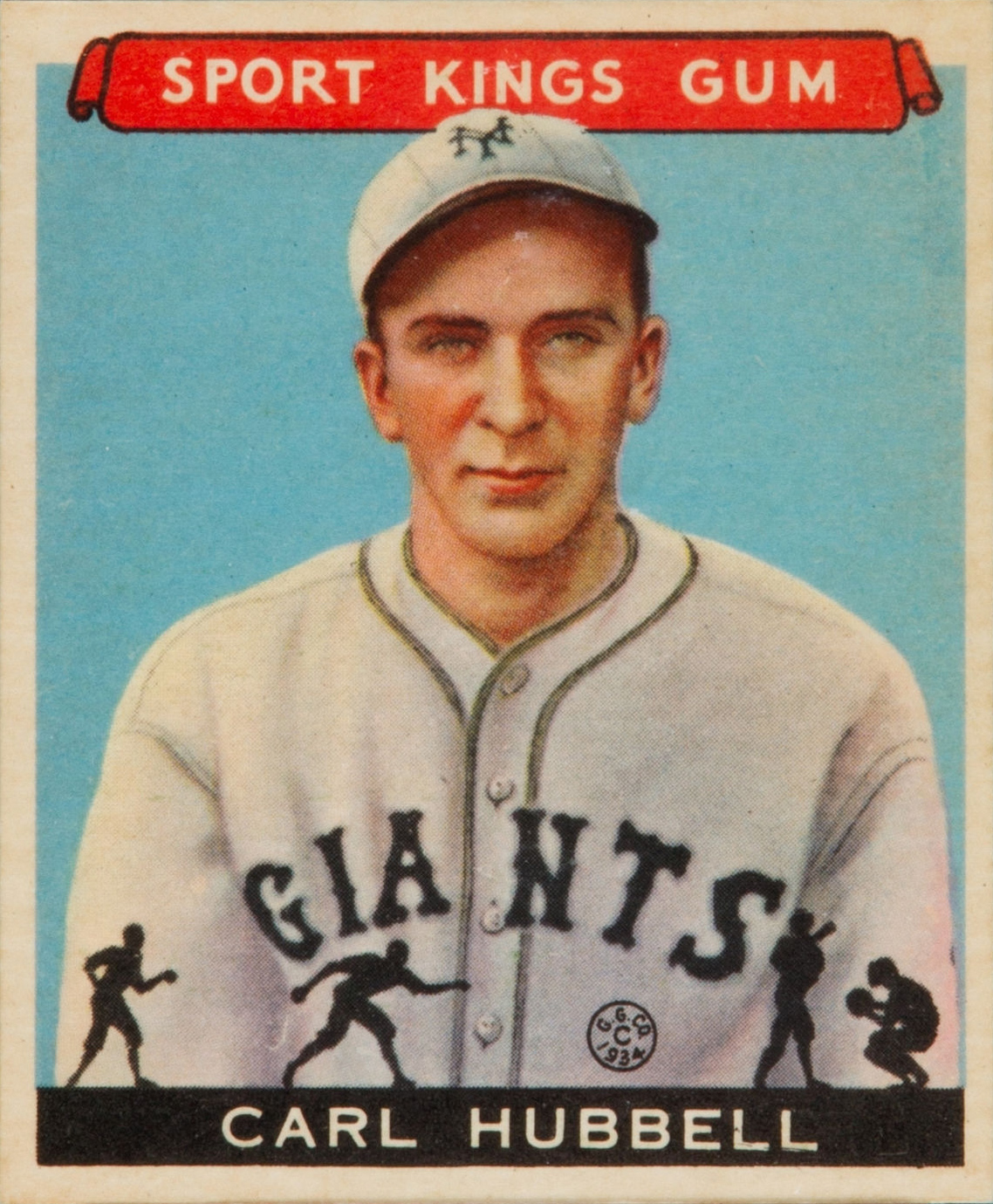
Carl Hubbell

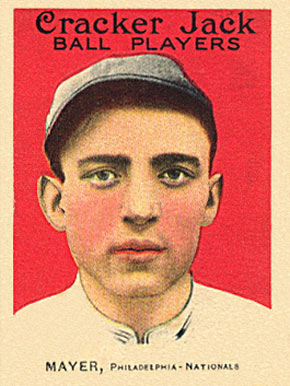
Erskine Mayer

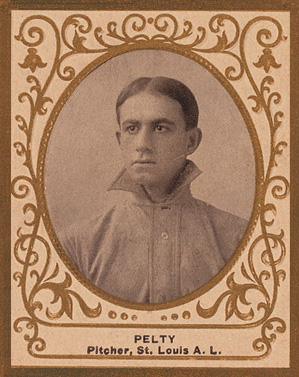
Barney Pelty

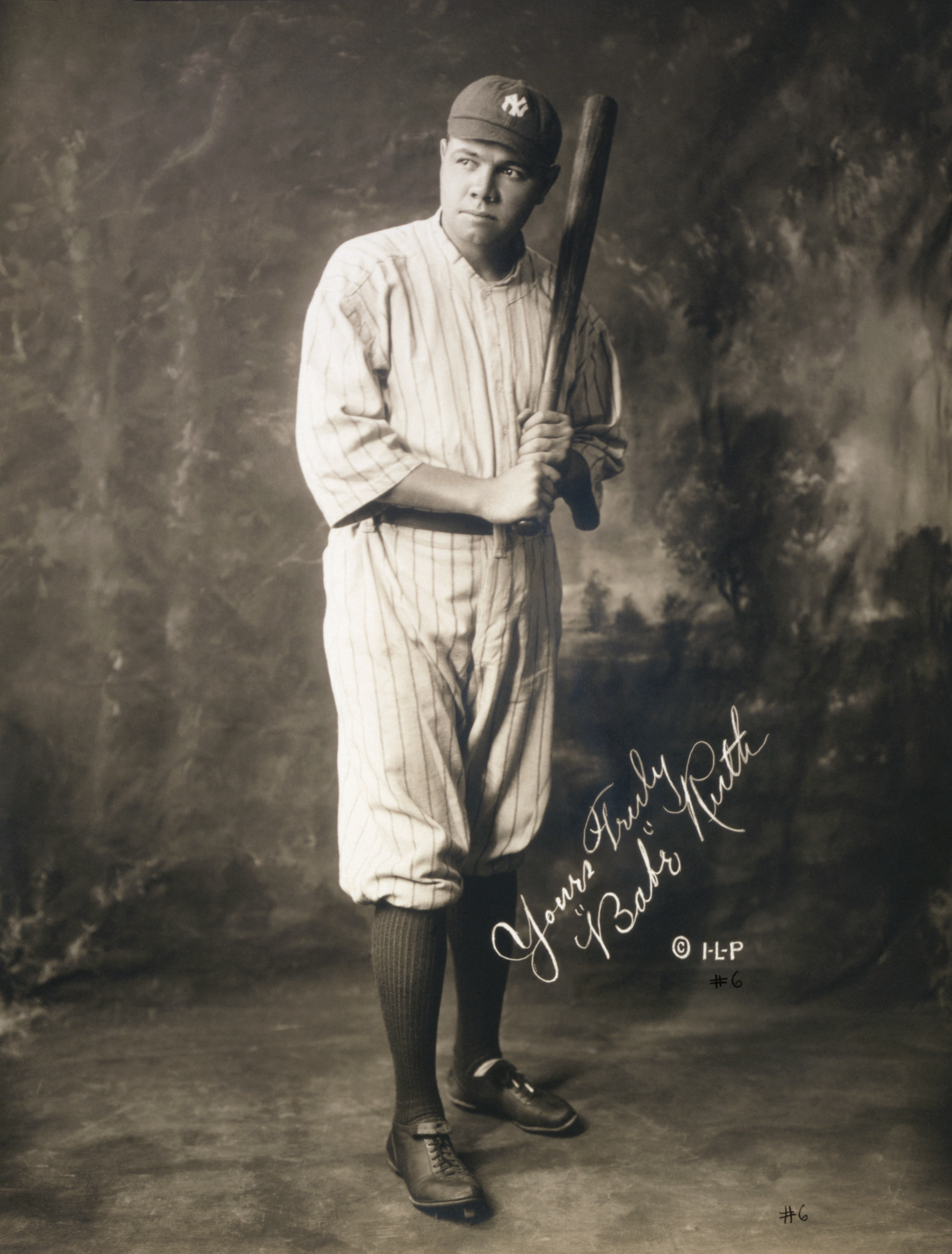
Babe Ruth

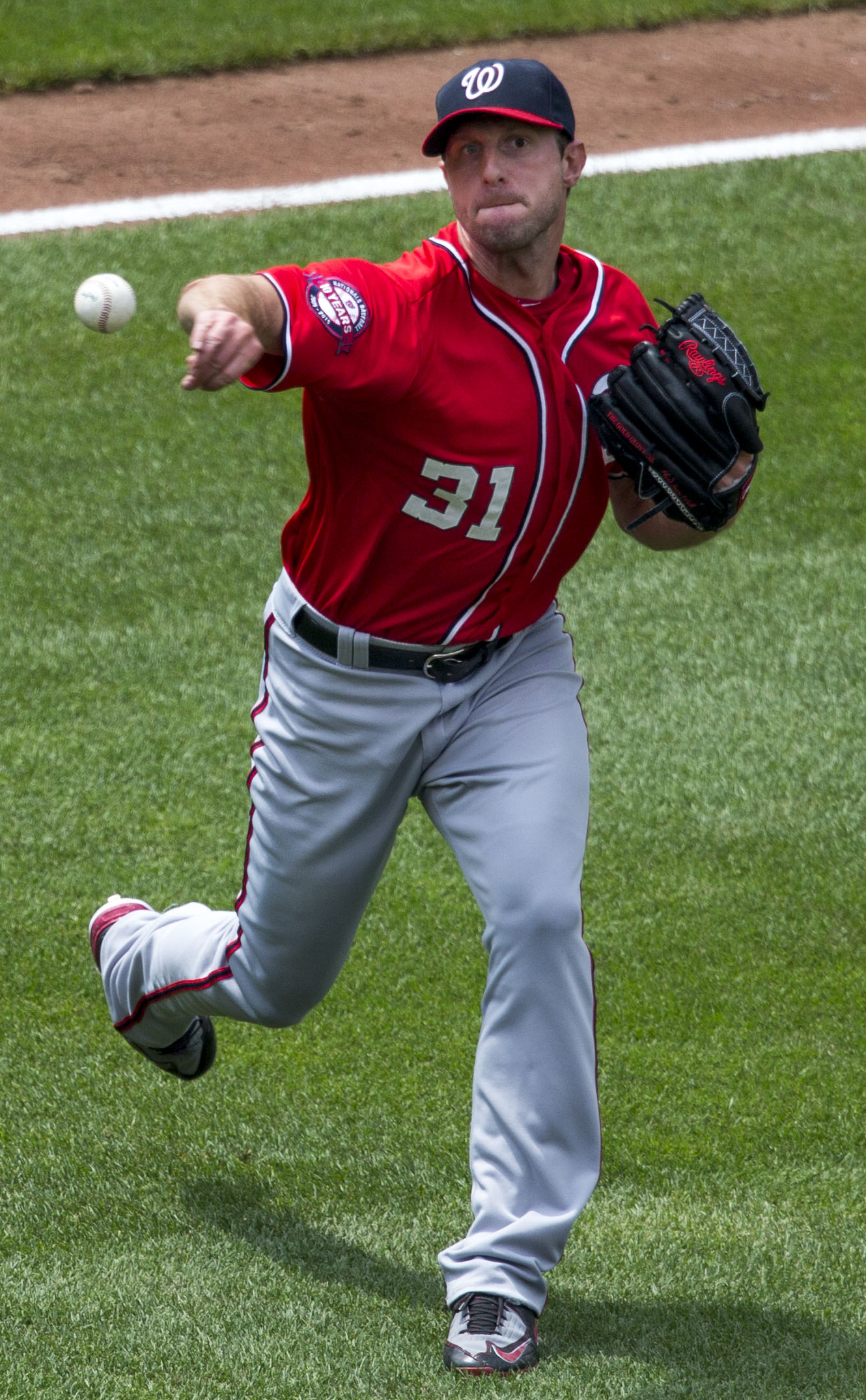
Max Scherzer

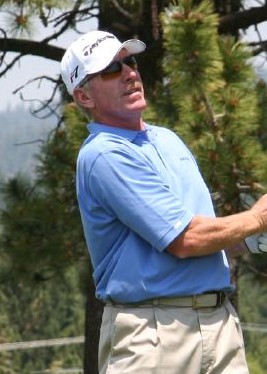
Mike Schmidt

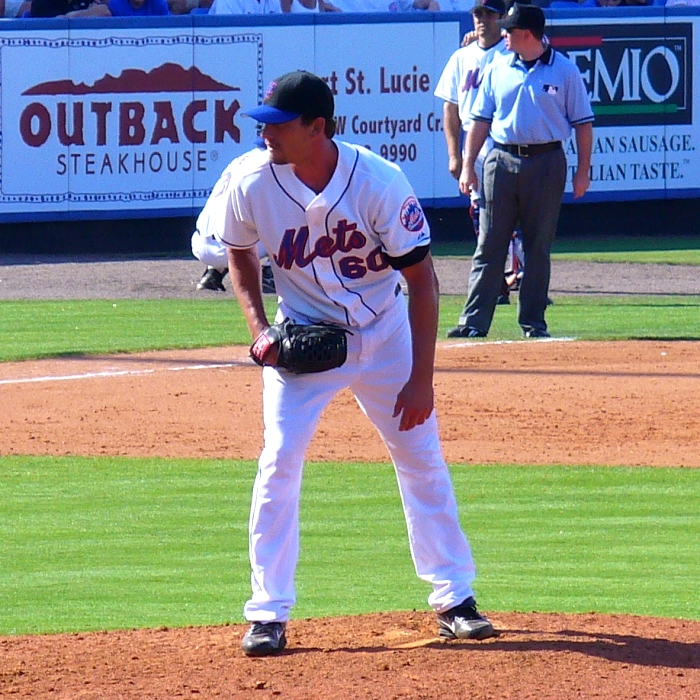
Scott Schoeneweis

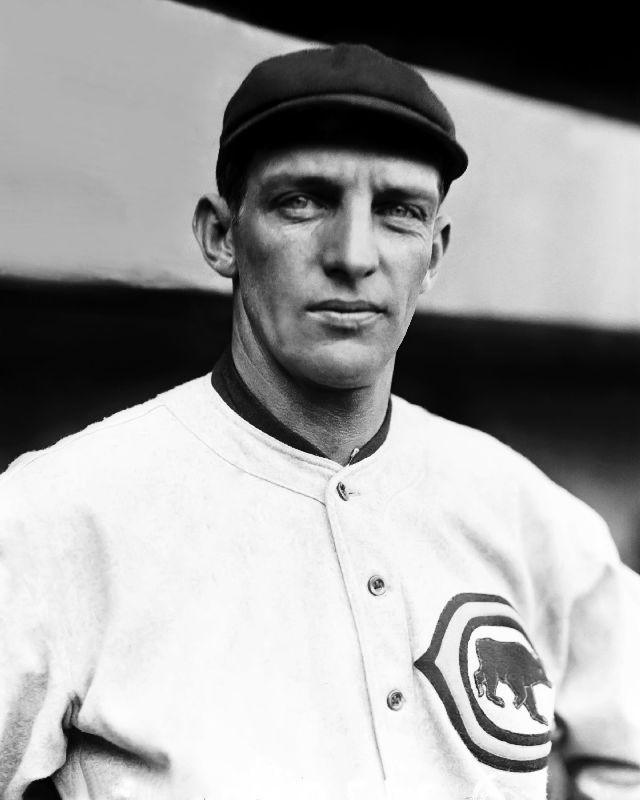
Frank Schulte

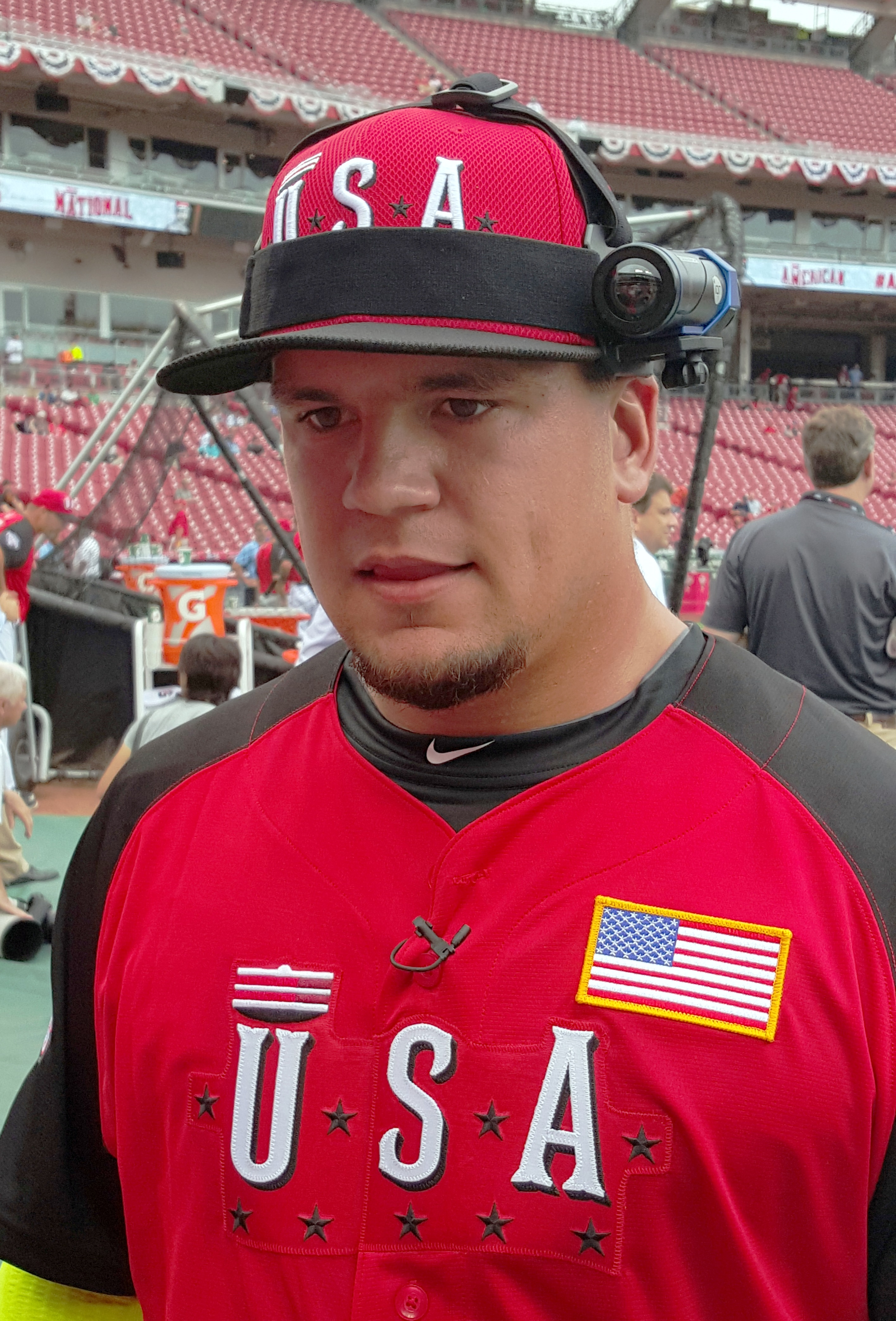
Kyle Schwarber

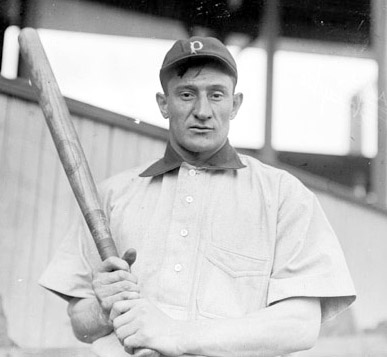
Honus Wagner

- Chris von der Ahe – owner of the St. Louis Brown Stockings of the American Association, now the St. Louis Cardinals
- Nick Altrock – professional baseball player and coach
- Trevor Bauer – MLB pitcher
- Chris Beck – Chicago White Sox pitcher
- Heinz Becker – MLB first baseman who played for the Chicago Cubs (1943, 1945–46) and Cleveland Indians (1946–47)
- Zinn Beck – MLB third baseman, shortstop and first baseman; minor league manager and baseball scout
- Heinie Beckendorf – former MLB catcher
- Joe Benz – former pitcher for the Chicago White Sox; threw a no-hitter
- Lou Bierbauer – former MLB second baseman during the late 1880s and 1890s; credited with giving the Pittsburgh Pirates their name
- Mike Blowers – former MLB third baseman and first baseman; current Seattle Mariners radio commentator
- Brennan Boesch – MLBoutfielder
- Ted Breitenstein – former MLB pitcher and part of the "Pretzel Battery" with Heinie Peitz
- Clay Buchholz – MLB pitcher for the Boston Red Sox
- Taylor Buchholz – MLB pitcher
- Mark Buehrle – MLB pitcher
- Fritz Buelow – former MLB
- Jay Buhner – former MLB player
- Madison Bumgarner – MLB pitcher for the San Francisco Giants
- Roger Clemens – former MLB pitcher
- Bill Dahlen – former MLB shortstop
- Babe Danzig – MLB first baseman
- Ross Detwiler – MLB pitcher
- Mel Deutsch – former MLB pitcher
- Bill Dietrich – MLB pitcher
- Derek Dietrich – MLB 2nd baseman
- Barney Dreyfuss – baseball executive
- Ryne Duren – former relief pitcher in MLB
- Justin Duchscherer – MLB pitcher
- David Eckstein – MLB player and 2006 World Series MVP
- Mose Eggert – second baseman in Major League Baseball
- Hack Eibel – utility player in Major League Baseball
- Jim Eisenreich – former MLB outfielder
- Kid Elberfeld – "The Tabasco Kid", former shortstop in MLB
- Jacoby Ellsbury – center fielder
- Joe Engel – former left-handed pitcher and scout in MLB who spent nearly his entire career with the Washington Senators
- Oscar Emil "Happy" Felsch – center fielder for the Chicago White Sox, best known for his involvement in the 1919 Black Sox Scandal
- David Freese – 2011 National League Championship Series MVP Award and the 2011 World Series MVP Award winner
- Frank Frisch – former MLB player and manager
- Bruce Froemming – MLB umpire, then special assistant to the vice president on umpiring
- Gene Garber – former MLB player
- Ron Gardenhire – former New York Mets player and current Minnesota Twins manager
- Lou Gehrig – MLB player
- Charlie Gehringer – MLB second baseman, played 19 seasons (1924–1942) for the Detroit Tigers
- Charlie "Pretzels" Getzien – former MLB pitcher
- Troy Glaus – former MLB third baseman
- Paul Goldschmidt – MLB first baseman
- Zack Greinke – MLB pitcher
- Charlie Grimm – former MLB player
- Justin Grimm – MLB relief pitcher
- Heinie Groh – third baseman for the Cincinnati Reds and New York Giants
- Travis Hafner – Cleveland Indians designated hitter
- Noodles Hahn – former MLB pitcher
- Ian Happ – second baseman for the Chicago Cubs
- Roy Hartzell – MLB player 1906–1916
- Arnold Hauser – former MLB shortstop
- Harry Heilmann – Hall of Fame MLB player and World War I Veteran
- Fred Heimach – former MLB pitcher and part of the "Murderers' Row" Yankee teams
- Tommy Henrich – MLB player nicknamed "The Clutch" and "Old Reliable"
- Tom Herr – former MLB second baseman
- August Herrmann – MLB executive
- Orel Hershiser – former MLB pitcher
- Buck Herzog – MLB infielder and manager
- Whitey Herzog – MLB outfielder, scout, coach, manager, general manager and farm system director
- Shea Hillenbrand – baseball player
- Dick Hoblitzel – MLB first baseman
- Billy Hoeft – former MLB pitcher
- Barbara Hoffman – All-American Girls Professional Baseball League player
- Glenn Hubbard – former Atlanta Braves and Oakland Athletics player and current Braves' coach
- Carl Hubbell – MLB Hall of Fame screwball pitcher
- John Hummel – former MLB utility player
- Brock Huntzinger – MLB free agent
- Jason Isringhausen – MLB relief pitcher
- Edwin Jackson – MLB pitcher
- Derek Jeter – former MLB shortstop, played 20 season
- Jeff Karstens – MLB pitcher
- Pop Kelchner – college professor who spoke seven languages; prolific MLB scout
- Alex Kellner – MLB pitcher
- Walt Kellner – MLB pitcher
- Dean Kiekhefer – MLB relief pitcher
- Chuck Klein – former MLB outfielder
- Johnny Kling – former MLB catcher
- Bob Knepper – former MLB all-star pitcher
- Chuck Knoblauch – former MLB second baseman
- Mark Koenig – former MLB shortstop for the New York Yankees, 1925–1936
- Howie Koplitz – baseball player, pitcher for the 1961 Tigers and then the Senators until 1966
- Rick Kranitz – MLB pitching coach
- Gene Krapp – MLB pitcher
- Erik Kratz – MLB catcher
- Harvey Kuenn – player, coach and manager in MLB
- Randy Keisler – former MLB pitcher
- Dallas Keuchel – MLB pitcher
- Bowie Kuhn – former commissioner of MLB
- Kenesaw Mountain Landis – while serving as a Federal judge, Landis, an ardent baseball fan, was selected as chairman of a new National Commission of baseball
- Charley Lau – American League catcher and hitting coach, authored How to Hit .300
- Charlie Leibrandt – former MLB pitcher
- Craig Lefferts – former MLB pitcher
- Jon Lieber – MLB pitcher
- Jesse Litsch – MLB pitcher
- Hans Lobert – infielder, coach, manager and scout in MLB
- Kyle Lohse – MLB pitcher
- Chuck Machemehl – former Cleveland Indians pitcher
- Heinie Manush – Hall of Fame left-fielder in MLB
- Nick Markakis – outfielder for the Baltimore Orioles
- Erskine Mayer – MLB pitcher
- Heinie Meine – sometimes "Heinie" Meine, professional baseball player
- Fred Merkle – first baseman in Major League Baseball, 1907–1926
- Bob Meusel – former MLB shortstop
- Emil Meusel – former MLB outfielder
- Bill Mueller – retired MLB third baseman
- Freddie Muller – infielder in Major League Baseball
- Les Mueller – former MLB pitcher
- Walter Mueller – former professional baseball player who played outfield in MLB 1922–1926
- Fritz Mollwitz – born in Germany, former Major League Baseball first baseman
- Chris Nabholz – former starting pitcher in MLB
- Jeff Niemann – pitcher for the Tampa Bay Rays
- Brett Oberholtzer – MLB pitcher
- Ross Ohlendorf – MLB pitcher
- Daniel Ortmeier – MLB pitcher
- Fritz Ostermueller – pitcher in MLB 1934–1948
- Barney Pelty – MLB pitcher
- Heinie Peitz – former MLB catcher and part of the "Pretzel Battery" with Ted Breitenstein
- Dick Radatz – "The Monster" or "Moose", relief pitcher in MLB
- Rick Reuschel – former MLB pitcher
- Rick Rhoden – former Pittsburgh Pirate pitcher and current golf professional
- John Rocker – former MLB reliever and controversial figure
- Oscar Roettger – first baseman and right-handed pitcher in Major League Baseball
- Wally Roettger – outfielder in Major League Baseball
- Trevor Rosenthal – MLB Pitcher
- Babe Ruth – MLB player 1914–1935
- Adley Rutschman – catcher for the Oregon State Beavers, seen as a top prospect for the 2019 MLB Draft
- Germany Schaefer – former second baseman in MLB who played fifteen seasons
- Jordan Schafer – MLB player
- Ray Schalk – MLB catcher
- Bobby Shantz – MLB pitcher
- Scott Schebler – outfielder in the Los Angeles Dodgers organization
- Bob Scheffing – baseball player, coach, manager and front-office executive
- Carl Scheib – right-handed pitcher for the Philadelphia Athletics and St. Louis Cardinals of Major League Baseball
- Max Scherzer – MLB pitcher
- Curt Schilling – MLB pitcher
- Ryan Schimpf – former LSU Tigers baseball and MLB infielder
- Gus Schmelz – MLB manager
- Clarke Schmidt – MLB baseball pitcher
- Jason Schmidt – MLB baseball pitcher
- Mike Schmidt – former Philadelphia Phillies third baseman and Hall of Famer
- Frank Schneiberg – pitcher in Major League Baseball
- Brian Schneider – MLB catcher
- Red Schoendienst – former player, coach and manager in MLB
- Scott Schoeneweis – MLB relief pitcher
- Marge Schott – managing general partner, president and CEO of Major League Baseball's Cincinnati Reds franchise, 1984–1999
- Paul Schrieber – MLB umpire
- Al Schroll – MLB baseball pitcher
- Heinie Schuble – former MLB infielder
- John Schuerholz – general manager of the Atlanta Braves
- Frank Schulte – right fielder in Major League Baseball
- Joe Schultz – catcher, coach and manager in MLB
- Joe Schultz Sr. – Joe "Germany" Schultz, outfielder and farm system director in MLB and a manager in minor league baseball
- Skip Schumaker – outfielder for the St. Louis Cardinals
- Ralph Schwamb – St. Louis Browns pitcher and convicted murderer
- Kyle Schwarber – MLB catcher
- Bob Shawkey – baseball pitcher who played fifteen seasons in Major League Baseball
- J. B. Shuck – outfielder for the Chicago White Sox
- John Smoltz – pitcher for the Atlanta Braves
- Travis Snider – outfielder in MLB
- Warren Spahn – Hall of Fame pitcher in MLB
- Justin Speier – relief pitcher
- Rusty Staub – MLB player for 23 seasons (1963–1985)
- Terry Steinbach – former catcher in MLB
- Hank Steinbrenner – art-owner and Senior Vice President of the New York Yankees, along with his brother Hal Steinbrenner
- Harry Steinfeldt – MLB utility infielder
- Casey Stengel – MLB player and manager, early 1910s–1960s
- Stephen Strasburg – MLB pitcher
- Gus Suhr – Major League Baseball first baseman
- Bruce Sutter – Hall of Fame right-handed relief pitcher in MLB
- Nick Swisher – infielder in MLB
- Duke Snider – Hall of Fame MLB center fielder
- Jake Thielman – MLB pitcher
- Jack Thoney – reserve outfielder / infielder in Major League Baseball who played from 1902 through 1911
- Peter Ueberroth – executive, served as commissioner of MLB, 1984–1989
- Bob Uecker – former MLB player and award-winning sportscaster, comedian, and actor
- Jim Umbricht – former MLB pitcher
- Frank Viola – former starting pitcher in MLB
- Chris von der Ahe – entrepreneur and owner of the St. Louis Browns of the National League, now known as the Cardinals
- Fritz Von Kolnitz – MLB third baseman
- Doug Waechter – MLB pitcher, currently a free agent
- Billy Wagner – MLB closer
- Heinie Wagner – former MLB shortstop for the New York Giants and the Boston Red Sox
- Honus Wagner – former Pittsburgh Pirate Hall of Fame shortstop, manager and hitting instructor
- Bill Wambsganss – second baseman in MLB
- Duke Welker – MLB pitcher
- Jayson Werth – MLB outfielder
- Vic Wertz – former MLB first baseman and outfielder
- Hoyt Wilhelm – Hall of Fame knuckleball pitcher in MLB
- Nick Wittgren – pitcher with the Miami Marlins
- Shawn Wooten – former MLB player
- Michael Wuertz – MLB pitcher
- Christian Yelich – MLB outfielder, great-grandson of Fred Gehrke
- Ryan Zimmerman – MLB player
- Jordan Zimmermann – MLB pitcher
- Ben Zobrist – MLB second baseman
- Bill Zuber – MLB pitcher, 1936–1947

=== Basketball ===
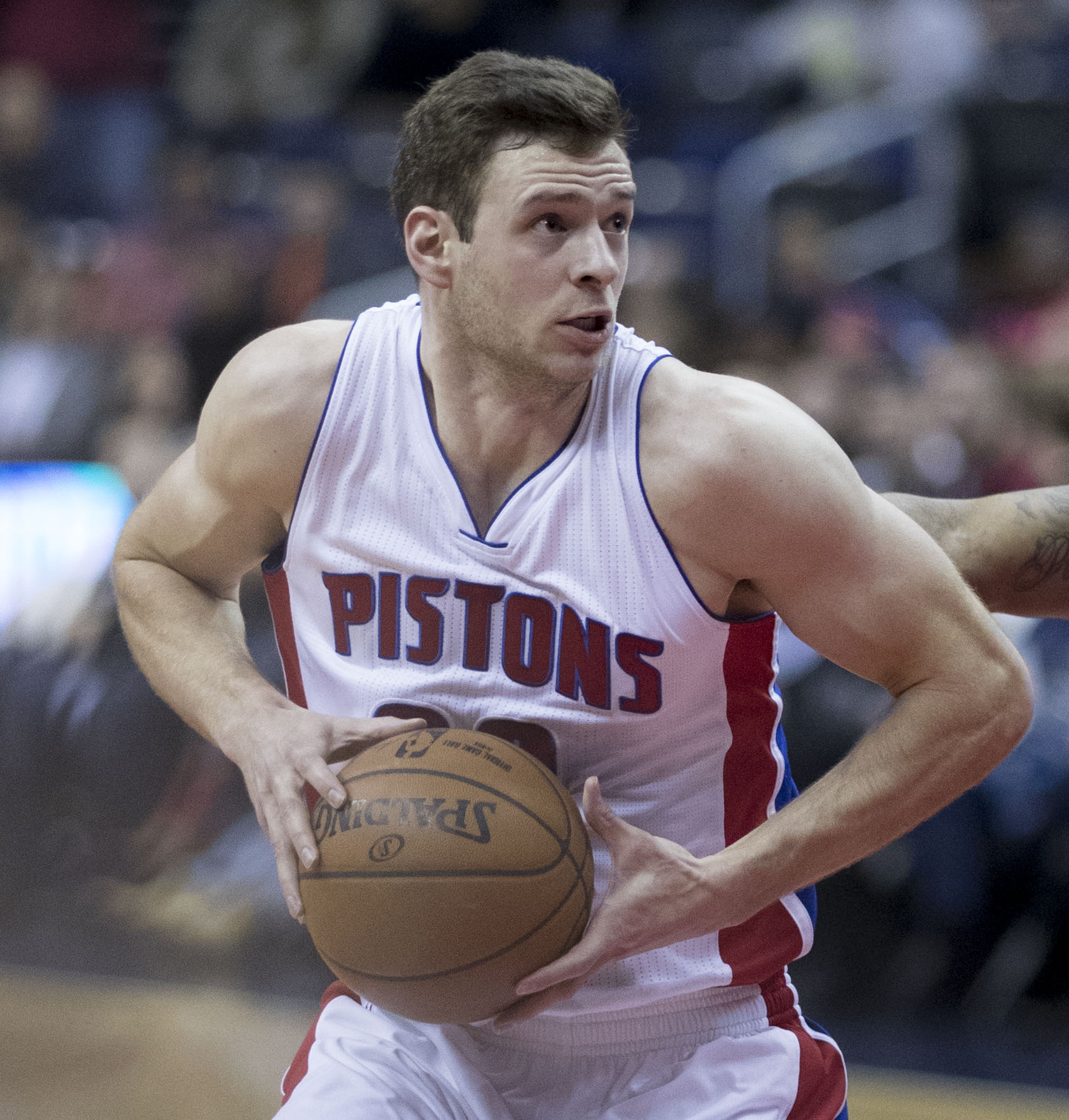
Jon Leuer

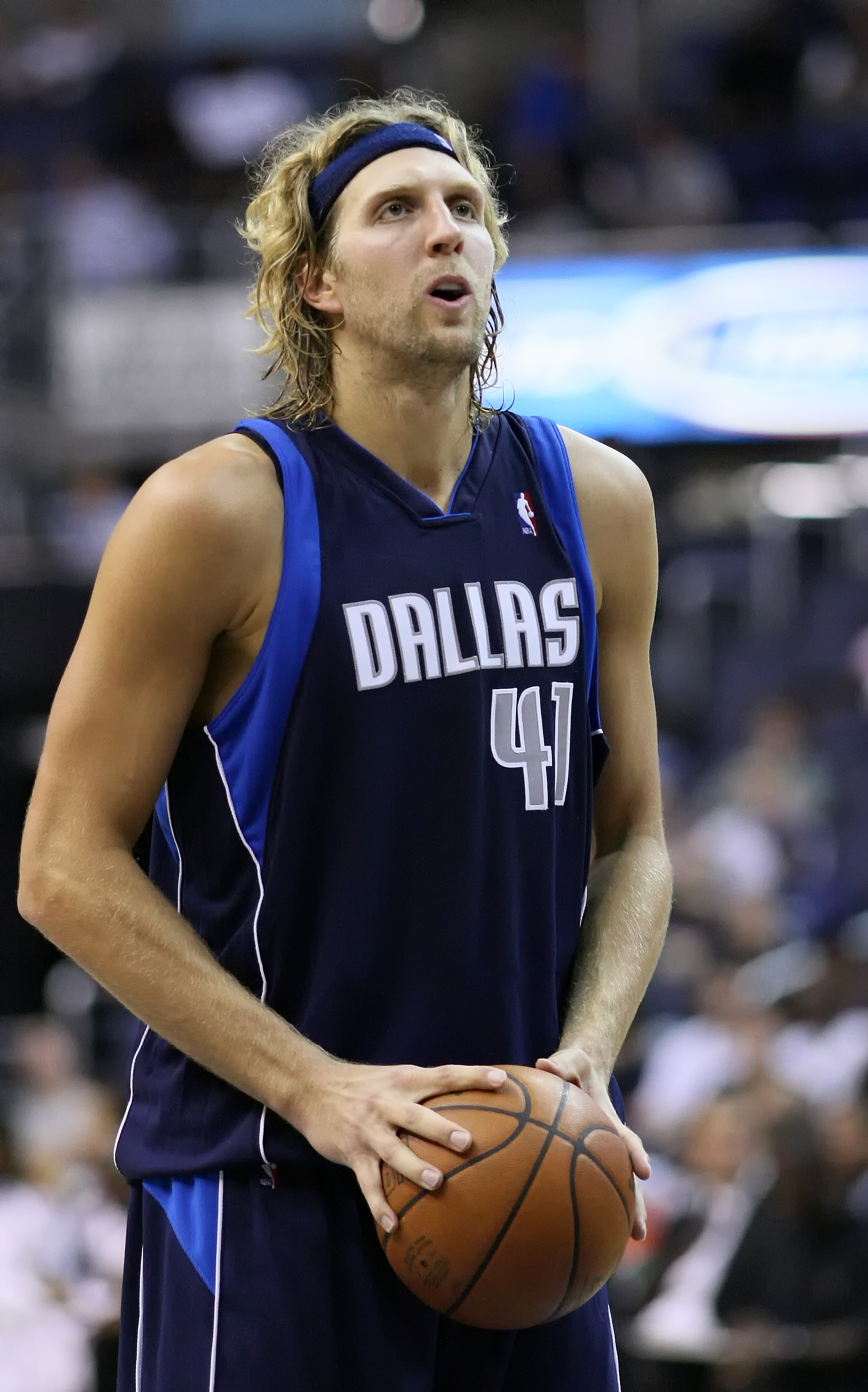
Dirk Nowitzki

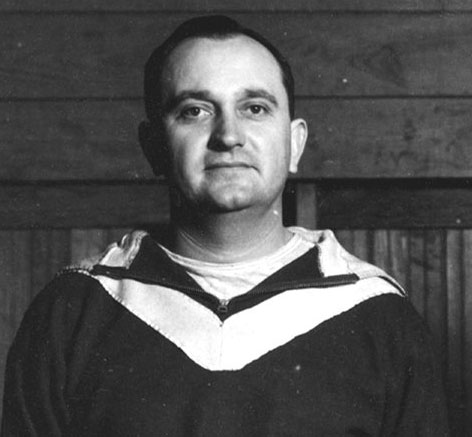
Adolph Rupp

- Uwe Blab – former NBA center
- Jim Boeheim – Syracuse University NCAA basketball coach
- Carlos Boozer – professional basketball player born in West Germany in a U.S. Army base
- Shawn Bradley – former center in the NBA and for the Germany national basketball team
- Carl Braun – professional basketball player and coach
- Christian Braun – former Kansas Jayhawks Basketball player and current NBA player
- Jon Brockman – professional basketball player
- Jud Buechler – former guard/forward with the NBA Chicago Bulls
- Jon Diebler – professional basketball player
- Demond Greene – professional basketball player for the Germany national team
- Isaiah Hartenstein – NBA Power Forward / Center
- Tom Heinsohn – professional basketball player and color commentator
- Fred Hetzel – retired NBA basketball player
- Kirk Hinrich – NBA guard for the Chicago Bulls
- Phil Jackson – New York Knicks team president, former NBA player and coach; Jackson's mother was part of a German Mennonite family
- Chris Kaman – center for the Los Angeles Clippers in the NBA and for the Germany national basketball team (dual citizen of the United States and of Germany)
- Lon Kruger – professional and college basketball coach
- Jon Leuer – professional basketball player
- Rebecca Lobo – television basketball analyst and a former player in the professional Women's National Basketball Association
- Drew Neitzel – All-American NCAA basketball player
- Jeff Neubauer – Western Kentucky University NCAA basketball coach
- Johnny Neumann – professional basketball player and coach
- Dirk Nowitzki – German player for Dallas Mavericks in NBA who applied for U.S. citizenship in 2011
- Greg Ostertag – NBA center
- Steve Prohm – college basketball coach
- Anthony Randolph – professional basketball player born in West Germany in a U.S. Army base
- Adolph Rupp – college basketball coach and Naismith Basketball Hall of Fame member
- Fred Schaus – basketball player, head coach and athletic director
- Detlef Schrempf – former NBA All-Star forward
- Akeem Vargas – professional basketball player for the Germany national team
- Jeff Walz – head coach of the women's basketball team at the University of Louisville

=== American Football ===
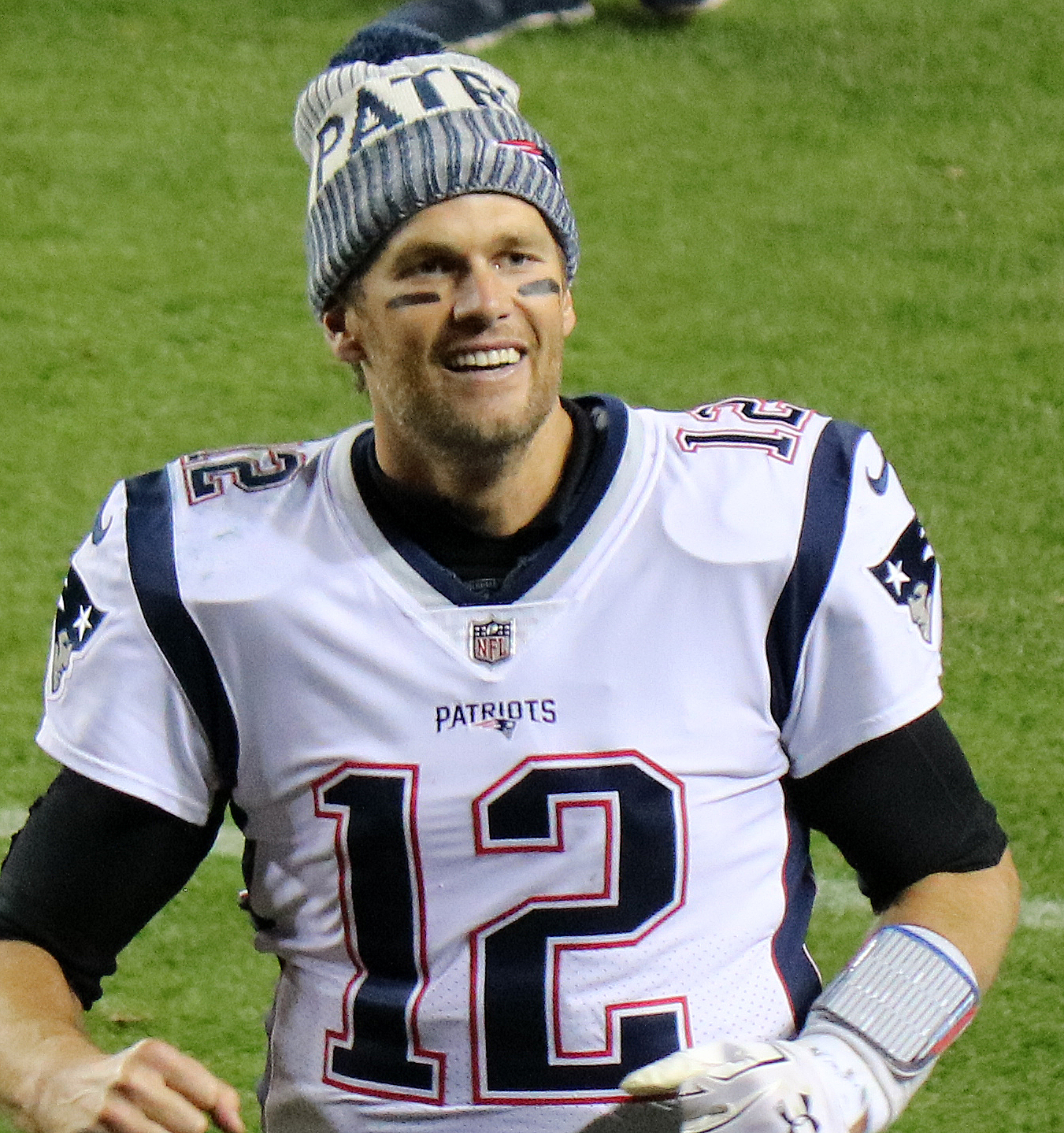
Tom Brady

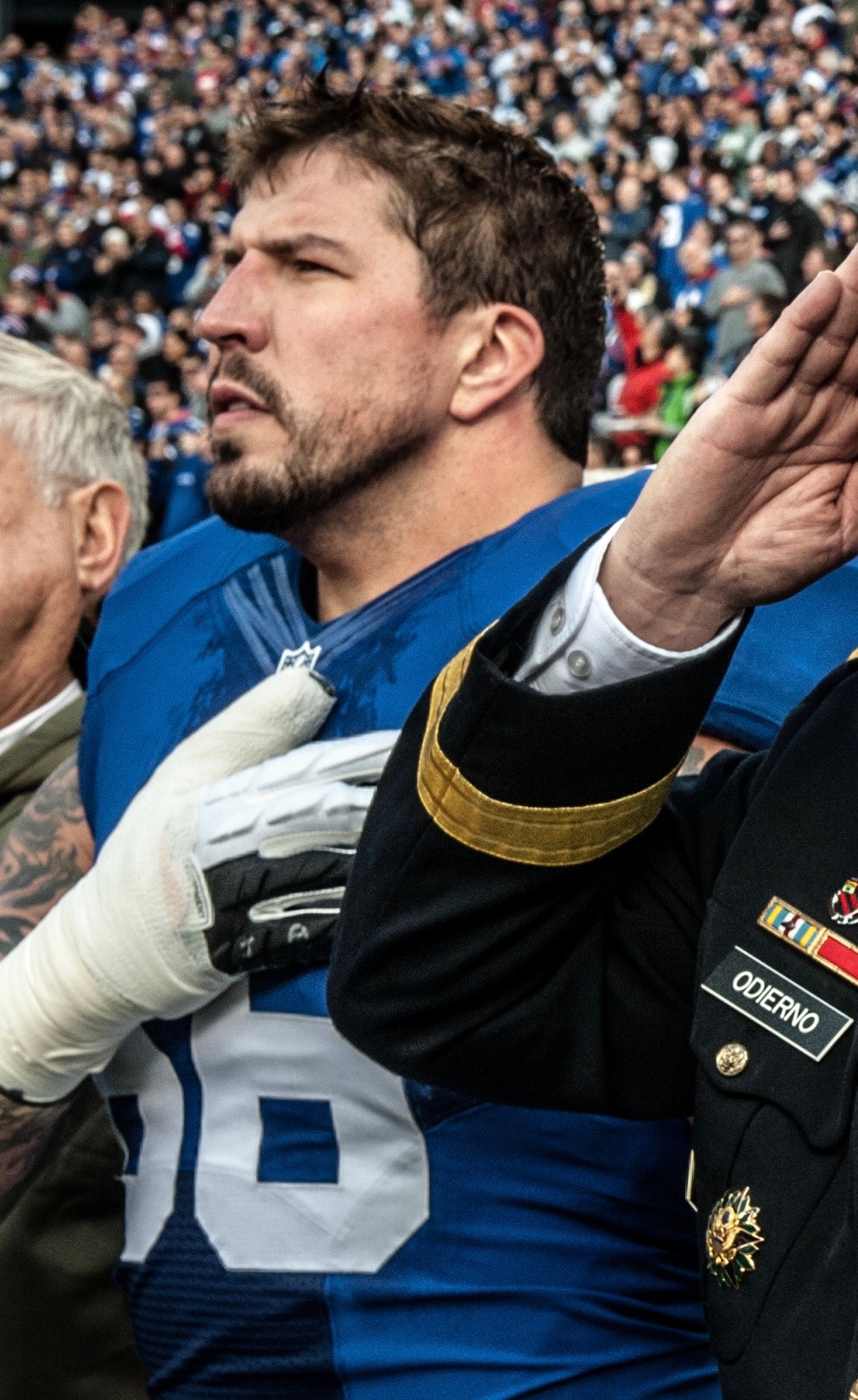
David Diehl

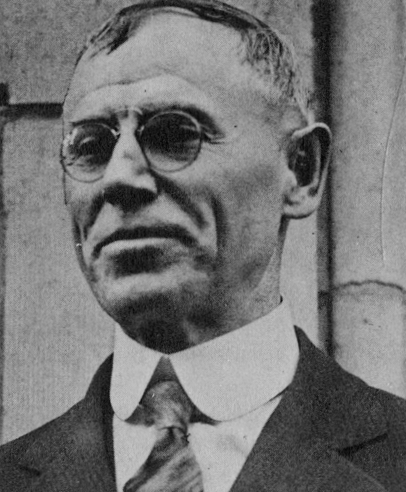
John Heisman

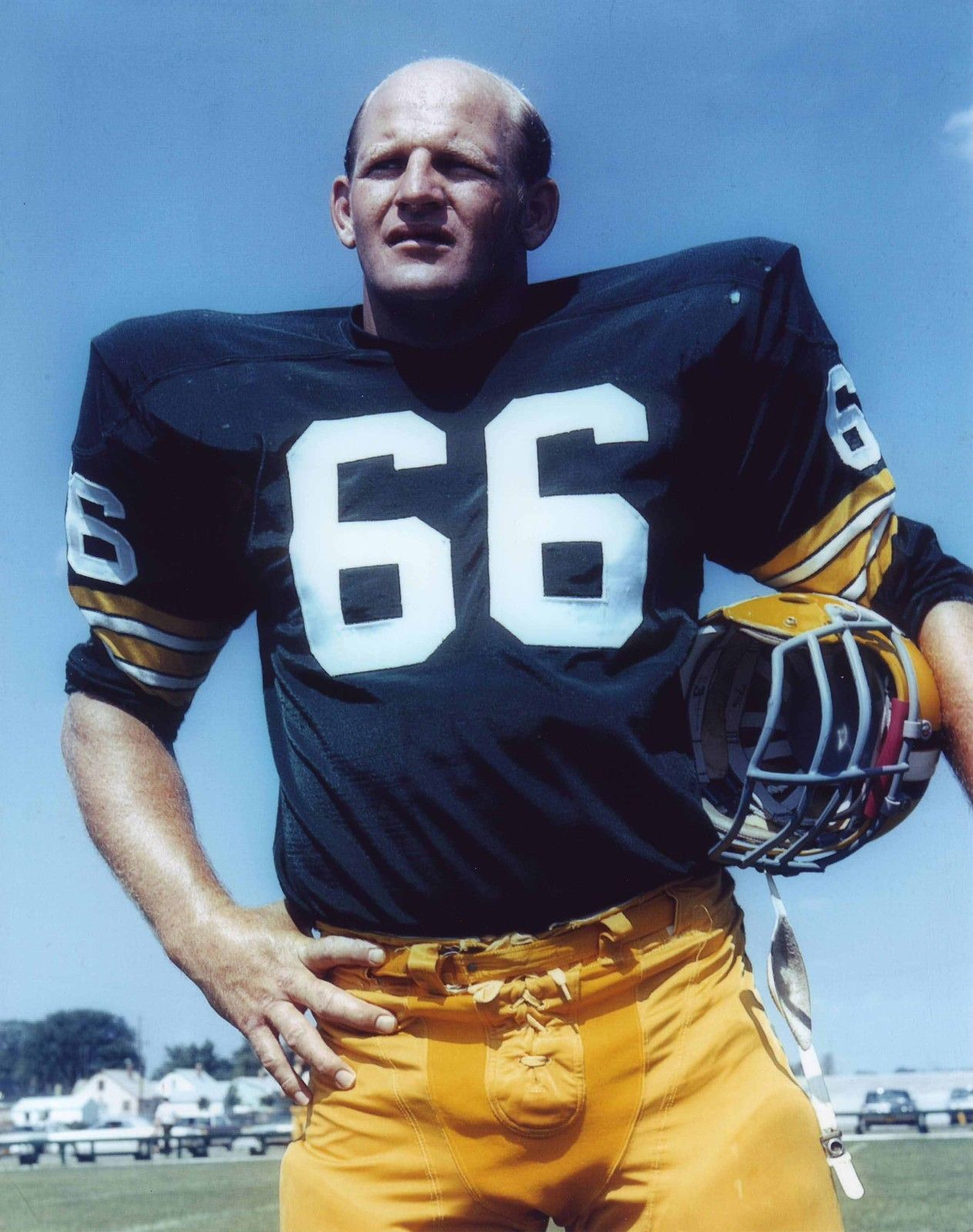
Ray Nitschke

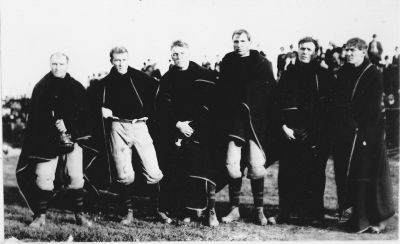
The Nesser brothers in the early 1920s. (L–R:) Ted, John, Frank, Fred, Phil, and Al

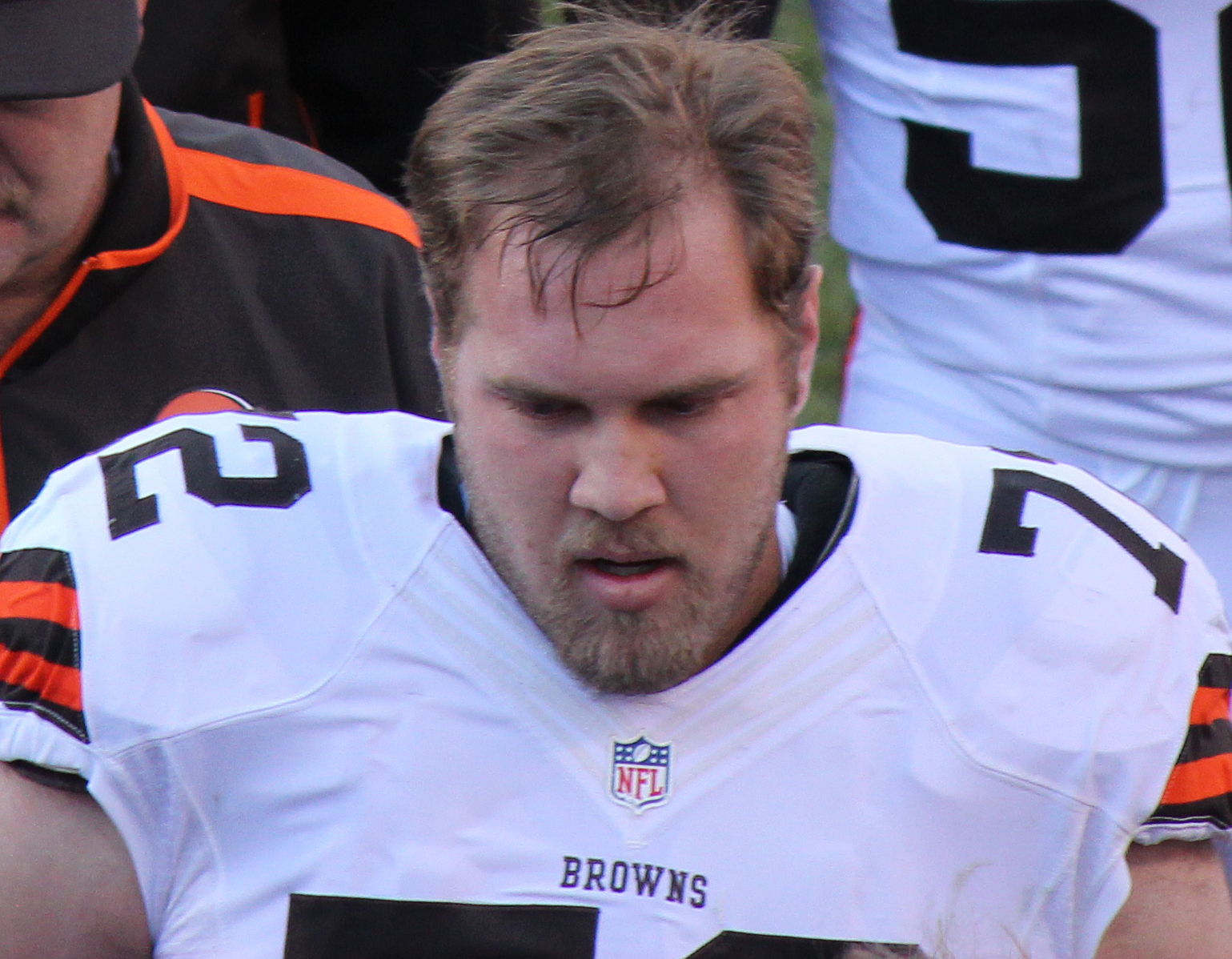
Mitchell Schwartz

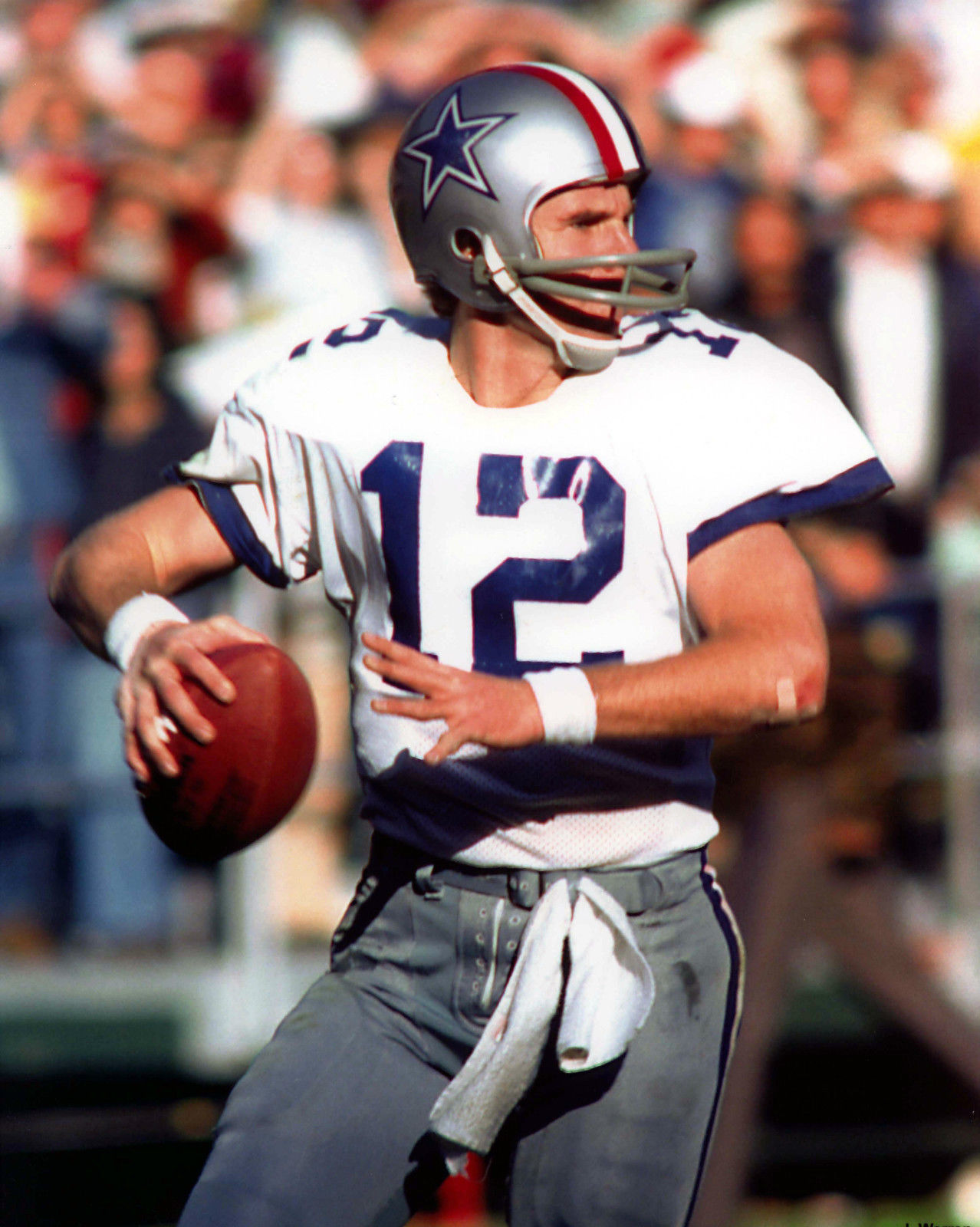
Roger Staubach

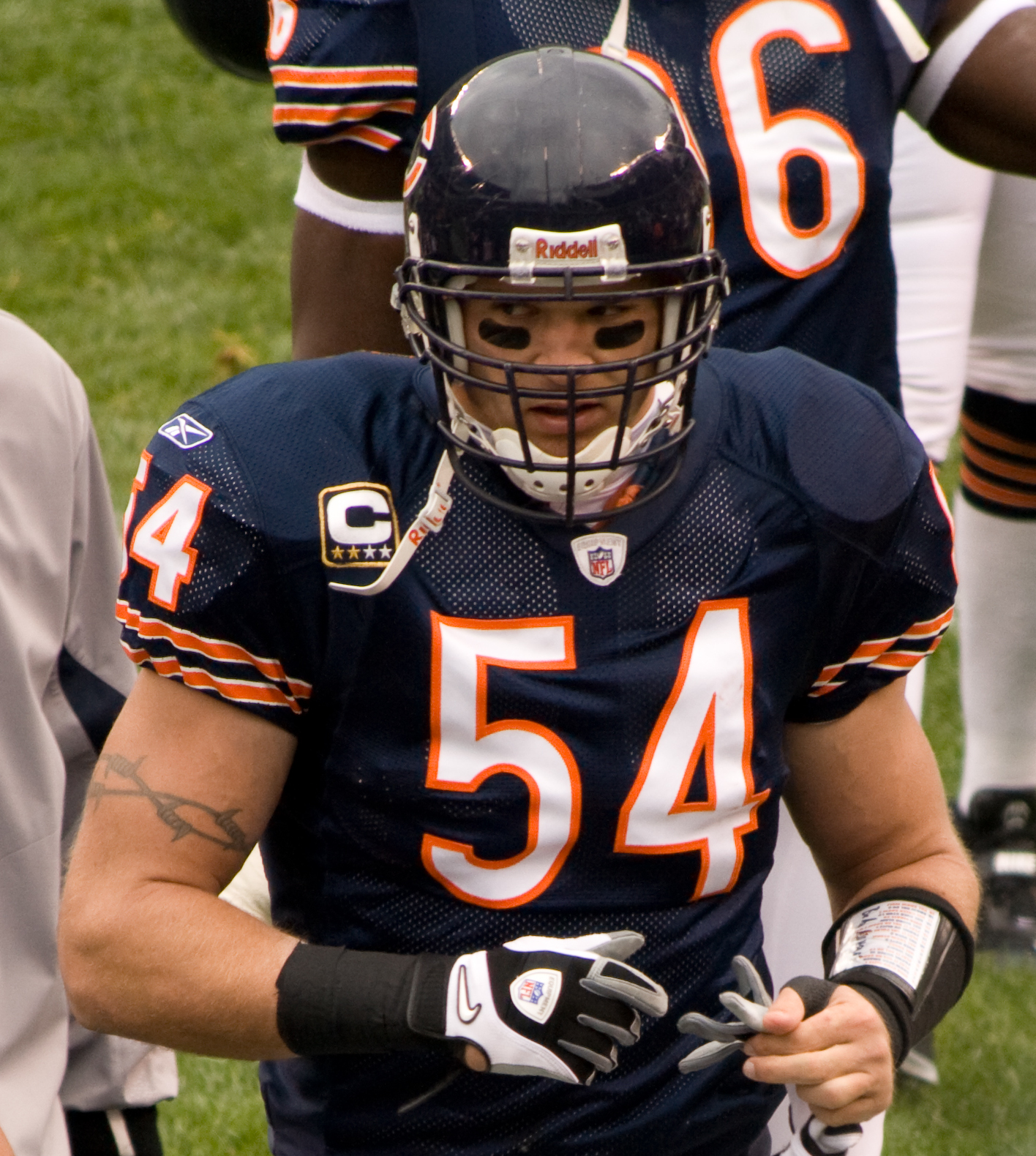
Brian Urlacher

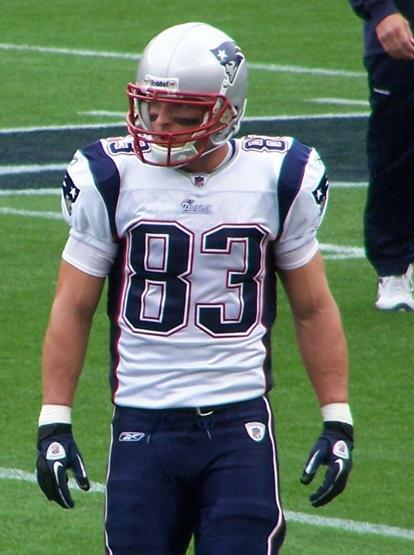
Wes Welker

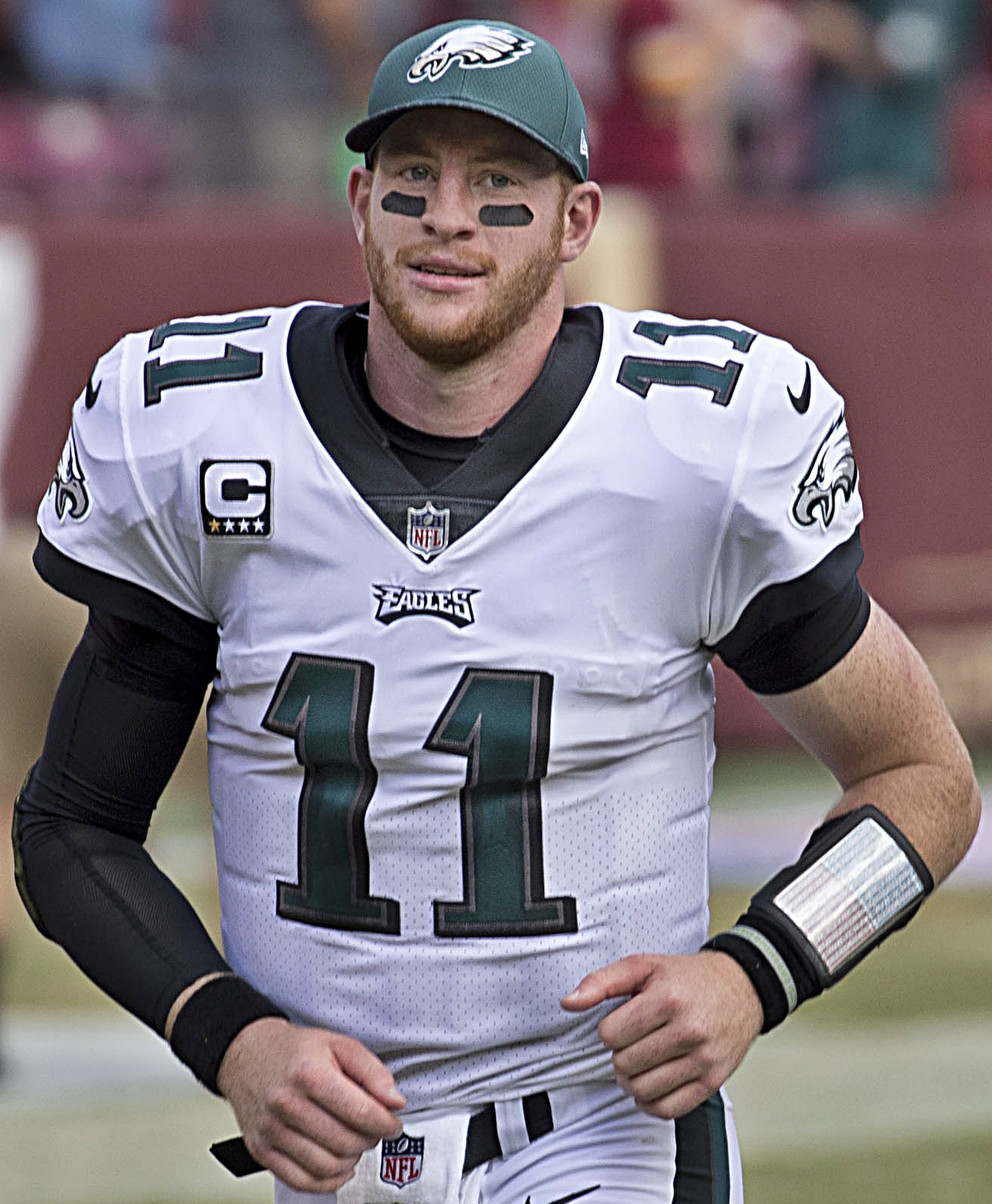
Carson Wentz

- John Alt – former offensive tackle in the NFL
- Jay Berwanger – the first recipient (1935) of the Downtown Athletic Club Trophy, renamed in 1936 as the Heisman Memorial Trophy
- Kroy Biermann – NFL defensive end
- Tom Brady – quarterback, one of only two players to win five Super Bowls
- Dave Butz – NFL defensive lineman, selected to the NFL 1980s All-Decade Team
- Amon-Ra St. Brown – wide receiver for the Detroit Lions of the National Football League (NFL). He played college football at USC and was drafted by the Lions in the fourth round of the 2021 NFL Draft
- Equanimeous St. Brown – wide receiver for the Chicago Bears of the National Football League (NFL). He played college football at Notre Dame and was drafted by the Green Bay Packers in the sixth round of the 2018 NFL Draft
- Gunther Cunningham – American football head coach
- Fritz Crisler – NCAA football coach
- David Diehl – football player and NFL offensive lineman
- Dan Dierdorf – former NFL football player and current television sportscaster
- Conrad Dobler – former offensive lineman
- Chris Doering – former college and professional football player; wide receiver in the NFL
- Dave Duerson – safety in the NFL, two-time Super Bowl Champion
- Herm Edwards - former NFL cornerback and head coach
- Zach Ertz – tight end in the NFL
- Kirk Ferentz – head coach of University of Iowa Hawkeyes football
- Fred Gehrke – NFL halfback / defensive back and executive; great-grandfather of Milwaukee Brewers left fielder, Christian Yelich
- Jared Goff – quarterback
- Bob Griese – Hall of Fame quarterback
- Al Groh – NCCA Virginia football head coach and former NFL coach
- Hinkey Haines – NFL player and MLB player
- Don Hasselbeck – NFL
- Matt Hasselbeck – NFL football player
- Tim Hasselbeck analyst and former professional quarterback
- Keith Heinrich – NFL tight end
- John Heisman – football player, coach, and namesake of the Heisman Trophy
- Kirk Herbstreit – former Ohio State University quarterback and analyst for ESPN's College GameDay
- Matthew Hibner - NFL tight end
- Elroy "Crazy Legs" Hirsch – running back and receiver for the Los Angeles Rams and Chicago Rockets, nicknamed for his unusual running style
- Domenik Hixon – NFL wide receiver
- Jeff Hostetler – former NFL quarterback
- Harvey Jablonsky – football player and U.S. Army Veteran who was a 'highly decorated veteran' of both World War II and later in his career the Vietnam War, elected to the College Football Hall of Fame in 1978
- Brett Keisel – defensive end for the Pittsburgh Steelers
- Don Klosterman – quarterback
- Jonathan Klinsmann – son of Jürgen Klinsmann, goalkeeper for LA Galaxy
- Dan Kreider – fullback in the NFL
- Dave Krieg – former NFL Seattle Seahawks quarterback
- Clint Kriewaldt – linebacker in the NFL
- Luke Kuechly – linebacker in the National Football League
- John Kuhn – fullback, currently playing for the Green Bay Packers
- Kory Lichtensteiger – NFL center
- Lex Luger – former football player and professional wrestler
- Todd Marinovich – former NFL American and Canadian football quarterback
- Zach Mettenberger – LSU and NFL quarterback
- Christian Mohr – NFL defensive end
- Nesser brothers – group of football playing brothers who helped make up the most famous football family in the United States, 1907–mid-1920s
  - John Nesser: born April 25, 1875, in Triere, Germany, and died August 1, 1931, in Columubus, Ohio
  - John Peter Nesser: born October 22, 1877, in Triere, Germany, and died May 29, 1954, in Columbus, Ohio
  - Philipp Gregory Nesser: born December 10, 1880, in Triere, Germany, and died May 9, 1959, in Columbus, Ohio
  - Theodore H. (Ted) Nesser: born April 8, 1883, in Dennison, Ohio, and died June 7, 1941, in Columbus, Ohio
  - Frederick William Nesser: born September 10, 1887, in Columbus, Ohio, and died July 2, 1967, in Columbus, Ohio
  - Francis Raymond (Frank) Nesser: born June 3, 1889, in Columbus, Ohio, and died January 1, 1953, in Columbus, Ohio
  - Alfred Louis Nesser: born June 6, 1893, in Columbus, Ohio, and died March 11, 1967, in Columbus, Ohio
  - Raymond Joseph Nesser: born March 22, 1898, in Columbus, Ohio, and died September 2, 1969, in Columbus, Ohio
- Rick Neuheisel – football coach
- Ray Nitschke – Hall of Fame football player
- Brock Osweiler – NFL quarterback
- Tyler Ott – long snapper
- Jim Otto – former Oakland Raider offensive lineman
- Robin Pflugrad – college football coach
- Ricky Proehl – former NFL wide receiver, two-time Super Bowl Champion
- George Ratterman – former player in the All-America Football Conference and the NFL
- Ben Roethlisberger – Pittsburgh Steelers Quarterback of Swiss-German descent, two-time Super Bowl Champion
- Rudy Ruettiger – former player at Holy Cross College (1972–1974) and Notre Dame
- George Sauer – former American football player, coach, college sports administrator, and professional football executive
- George Sauer Jr. – wide receiver who played six seasons for the American Football League's New York Jets
- Matt Schaub – NFL quarterback
- Bo Schembechler – former NCAA football coach at the University of Michigan
- Anthony Schlegel – former linebacker
- Cory Schlesinger – NFL fullback
- Blake Schlueter – former American football and NCAA TCU center
- Francis Schmidt – college football coach inducted into the College Football Hall of Fame
- Joe Schmidt – former 1950s NFL football player and coach
- Owen Schmitt – NFL fullback
- John Schneider – professional American football player in the Ohio League and the early National Football League for the Columbus Panhandles
- John Schneider – professional American football executive
- Joe Schobert – linebacker
- Turk Schonert – former NFL quarterback
- Jay Schroeder – former professional quarterback in the NFL
- Geoff Schwartz – NFL offensive lineman
- Mitchell Schwartz – NFL offensive tackle
- Jim Schwartz – NFL head coach
- Stephen Spach – NFL tight end
- Matt Spaeth – tight end for the Pittsburgh Steelers
- Roger Staubach – Heisman Trophy winner and Hall of Fame quarterback for the Dallas Cowboys
- Eric Steinbach – NFL offensive lineman
- Zach Strief – NFL offensive lineman
- Harry Stuhldreher – football player, coach, and college athletics administrator
- Zach Sudfeld – NFL tight end
- Nate Sudfeld – quarterback
- Mike Tannenbaum – professional football executive, who is currently the Executive Vice President of Football Operations for the Miami Dolphins and former general manager for the New York Jets
- Jim Tressel – college head football coach
- Brian Urlacher – Pro Bowl linebacker for the Chicago Bears
- Sebastian Vollmer – NFL offensive Lineman
- Kimo von Oelhoffen – NFL linebacker
- Uwe von Schamann – former NFL kicker
- Mike Wagner – safety for the Pittsburgh Steelers, 1971–1980; member of the famed Steel Curtain defense; played in two Pro Bowls
- Charlie Weis – NFL football coach
- Wes Welker – NFL wide receiver, punt returner, and kick returner
- Carson Wentz – football quarterback for the North Dakota State Bison
- Björn Werner – NFL linebacker
- Matt Wilhelm – NFL linebacker
- Kaden Wetjen – NFL wide receiver and return specialist
- Danny Wuerffel – former NFL quarterback and 1996 Heisman Trophy winner
- Zach Zenner – NFL running back
- Jim Zorn – Seattle Seahawks quarterback

=== Golf ===
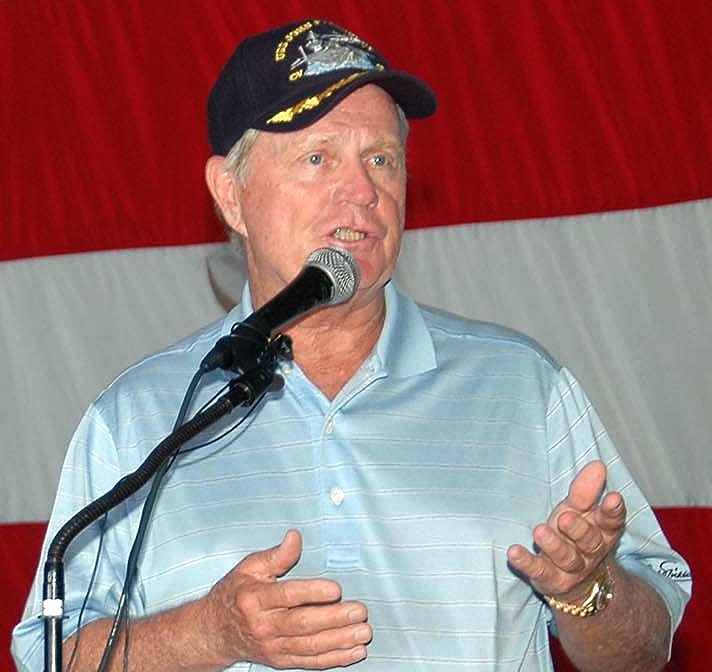
Jack Nicklaus

- Jason Dufner – professional golfer and 2013 PGA Championship winner
- Walter Hagen – golf legend
- Jack Nicklaus – professional golfer; won 18 career major championships on the PGA Tour over a span of 24 years
- Jordan Spieth – professional golfer, 2015 Masters Tournament winner with a score of 18 under par
- Tom Weiskopf – professional golfer

=== Ice hockey ===
- David Backes – professional NHL hockey player
- Mathew Dumba – professional NHL hockey player
- Christian Ehrhoff – professional NHL hockey player
- Jack Eichel – professional NHL hockey player
- Gabe Guentzel – professional ice hockey player
- Jake Guentzel – professional NHL hockey player
- Chris Kreider – hockey player
- Cody Lampl – professional ice hockey player
- Jamie Langenbrunner – NHL and U.S. Olympic hockey player
- Peter Mueller – professional NHL hockey player
- Jed Ortmeyer – professional hockey player
- Rob Schremp – professional hockey player
- Jordan Schroeder – ice hockey player
- Dennis Seidenberg – professional NHL hockey player
- Tim Schaller – professional NHL hockey player
- R. J. Umberger – professional NHL hockey player

=== Soccer ===
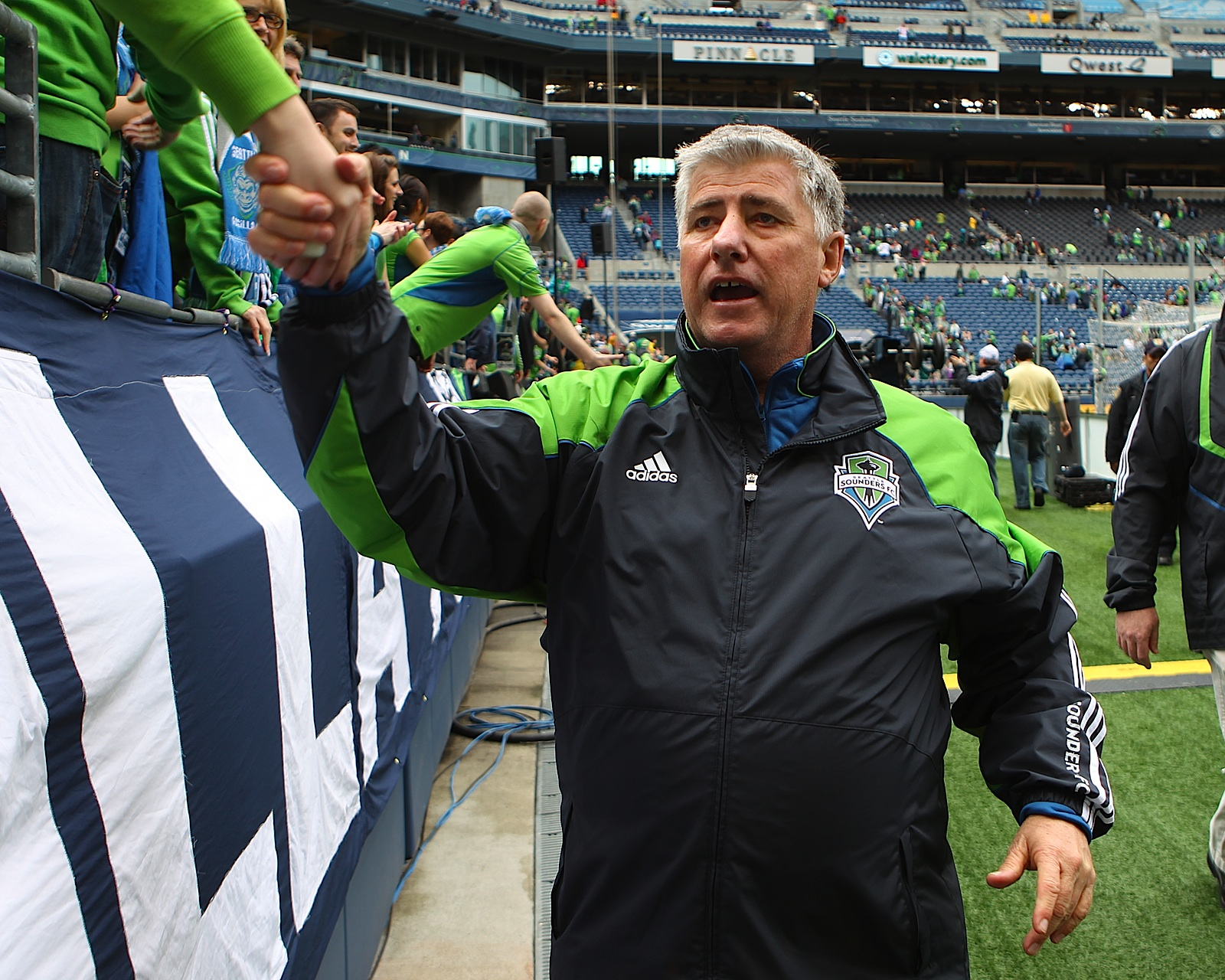
Sigi Schmid

- Walter Bahr – long-time captain of the U.S. national team, played in the 1950 FIFA World Cup when the U.S. defeated England 1–0
- Noahkai Banks – defender for FC Augsburg
- Nicole Barnhart – Olympic medalist and professional soccer player
- Kyle Beckerman – midfielder
- Tanner Tessmann - midfielder for Lyon
- Justin Braun – forward for Chivas USA
- Eric Brunner – soccer player who currently plays for Portland Timbers in Major League Soccer
- Rachel Buehler – Olympic medalist and professional soccer player
- Timothy Chandler – right back for Eintracht Frankfurt in the Bundesliga
- Jimmy Conrad – center back
- Montrell Culbreath – forward for Bayer Leverkusen
- Dietrich Albrecht – U.S. national team
- Thomas Dooley – long-time member and former captain of the United States national team
- Greg Eckhardt – American soccer player in Finland
- Whitney Engen – professional soccer player
- Brad Friedel – U.S. National Team, Premier League goalkeeper for Aston Villa
- Julian Green – professional soccer player
- Julian Gressel – left back for Minnesota United FC
- Marcus Hahnemann – soccer goalkeeper for the U.S. National Team and Wovlerhampton Wanderers in the Premier League
- Aaron Hohlbein – soccer player who currently plays for Fort Lauderdale Strikers in the North American Soccer League
- David Horst – soccer player currently playing for Portland Timbers in Major League Soccer
- Kasey Keller – goalkeeper
- Jerome Kiesewetter – forward currently playing for VfB Stuttgart in the Bundesliga in Germany
- Meghan Klingenberg – professional soccer player
- Jonathan Klinsmann – son of Jürgen Klinsmann, player for LA Galaxy
- Jürgen Klinsmann – professional football manager notably, Bundesliga club Bayern Munich and the United States national team and former player, a naturalized U.S. citizen.
- Ali Krieger – professional soccer player
- Fabian Johnson – professional soccer player for the U.S. national team; born and raised in Berlin
- Steven Lenhart – soccer player for the Columbus Crew
- Joanna Lohman – professional soccer player
- Justin Butler - Professional soccer player who plays for Borussia dortmund II
- Fred Lutkefedder – member of the U.S. soccer team at the 1936 Summer Olympics and Philadelphia German-Americans of the American Soccer League
- Alex Morgan – Soccer player
- Chris Rolfe – American soccer player playing in Denmark
- Sigi Schmid – Major League Soccer manager
- Chris Seitz – goalkeeper for the Philadelphia Union
- Jonathan Spector – soccer (football) player for the U.S. National Team and West Ham United in the Premier League
- Seth Stammler – plays for the New York Red Bulls
- Zack Steffen – goalkeeper for Manchester City
- Malik Tillman – midfielder for Bayer Leverkusen
- Timothy Tillman – midfielder for LAFC
- Taylor Twellman – retired professional soccer player
- Abby Wambach – Olympic medalist and professional soccer player
- Andrew Wiedeman – currently plays for FC Dallas in Major League Soccer
- Josh Wolff – forward, currently a free agent
- Gotoku Sakai

=== Tennis ===
- Bob Falkenburg – tennis player and 1948 Wimbledon Champion
- Liezel Huber – professional tennis player
- Sam Warburg – tennis player
- John Whitlinger – former professional tennis player
- Tami Whitlinger – former professional tennis player

=== Boxing, Mixed Martial Arts, Wrestling ===
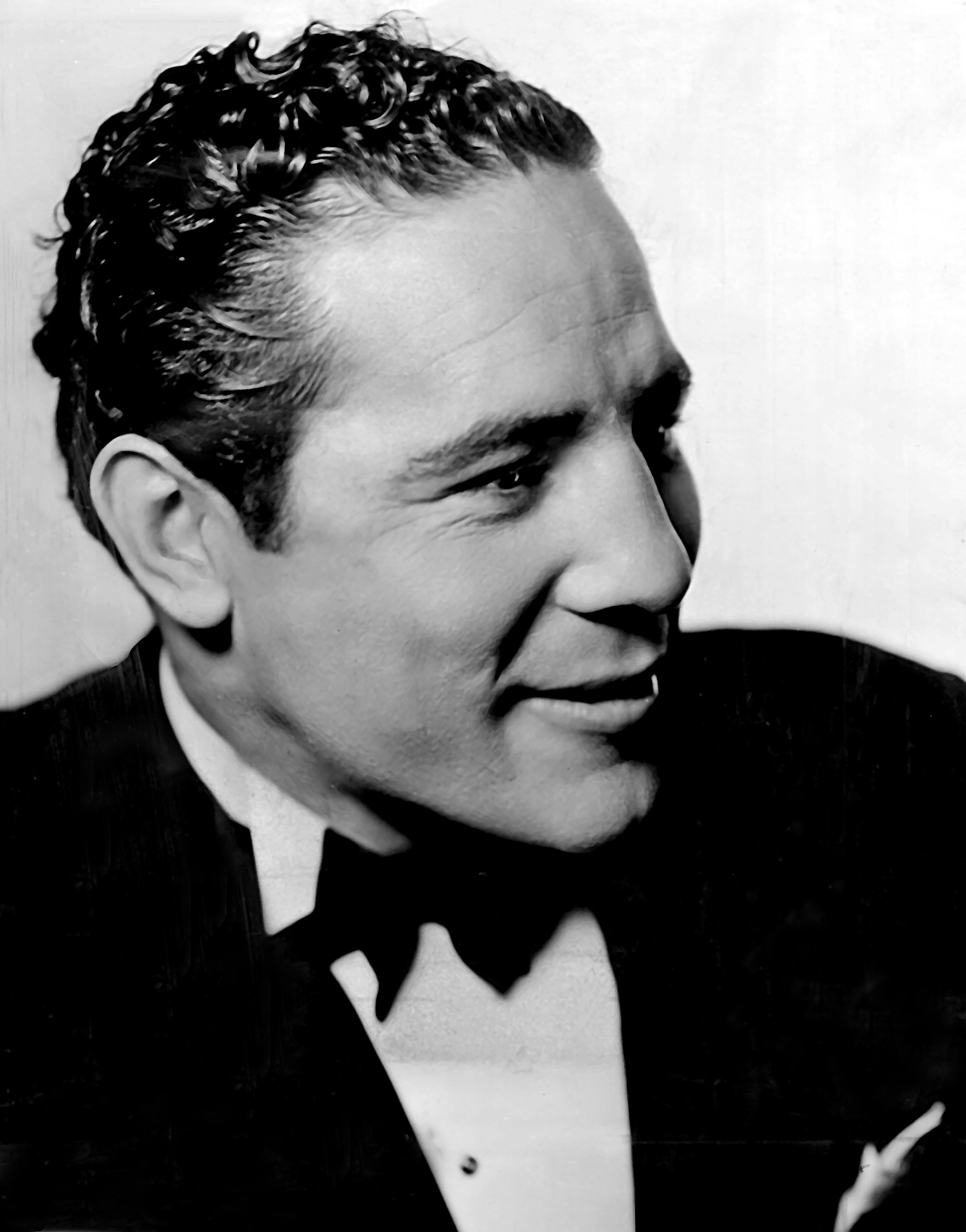
Max Baer

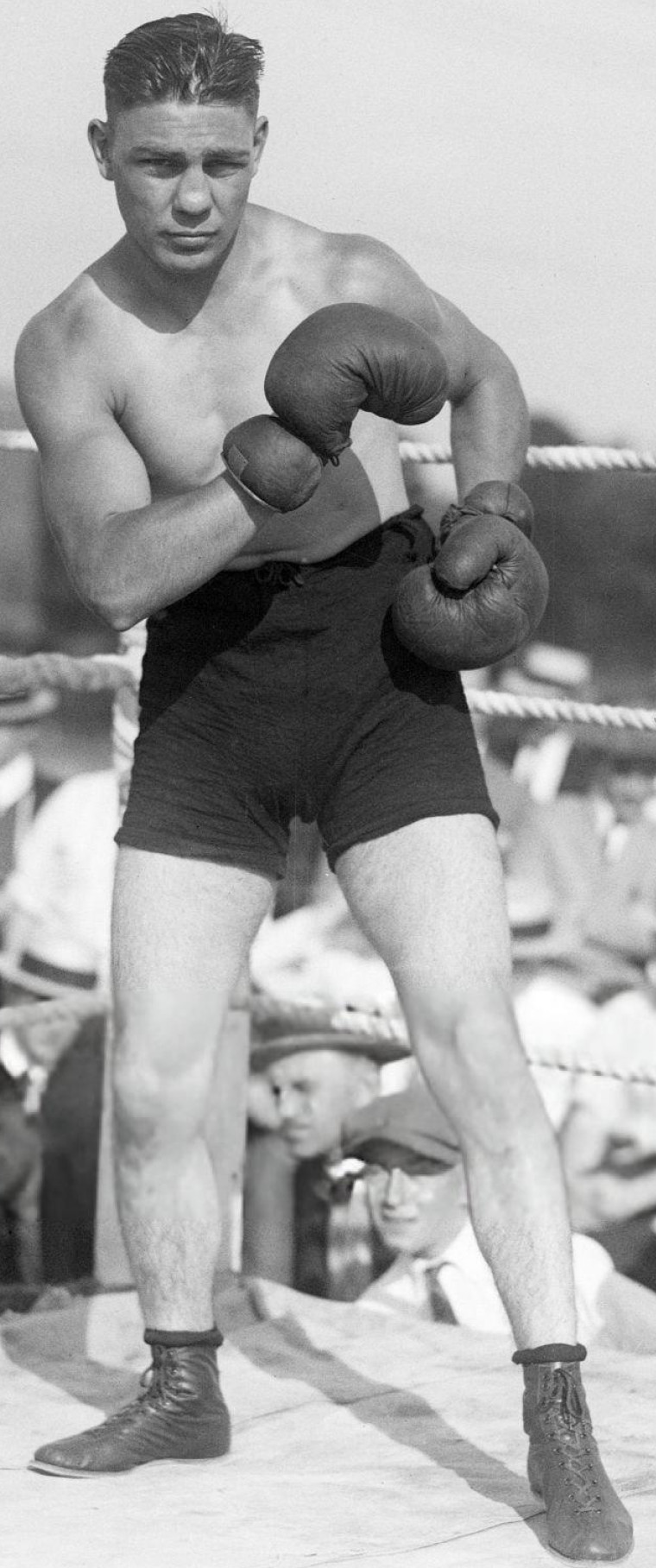
Harry Greb

- Max Baer – boxer, heavyweight boxing champion of the world
- Shayna Baszler – professional wrestler and mixed martial artist, her father is of German descent
- Mac Danzig – professional mixed martial arts fighter and instructor, and is a former lightweight champion for the King of the Cage and Gladiator Challenge mixed martial arts organizations
- Ted DiBiase – former professional wrestler
- Ted DiBiase Jr. – former professional wrestler
- Justin Gaethje - professional MMA fighter, UFC Lightweight Champion
- Harry Greb – professional boxer, nicknamed "The Pittsburgh Windmill", he was the American Light Heavyweight Champion, 1922–1923 and World Middleweight Champion, 1923–1926
- April Hunter – professional wrestler, professional wrestling valet and fitness and glamour model
- Maven Huffman - professional wrestler of partial German descent
- Nia Jax – professional wrestler
- Brock Lesnar – professional wrestler and MMA fighter
- Randy Orton – professional wrestler
- Mercedes Varnado – professional wrestler known in the WWE as "Sasha Banks" and formerly known as "Mercedes KV"
- David Schultz – retired professional wrestler, known by his ring name "Dr. D"
- Ryan Schultz – professional mixed martial arts (MMA) fighter, currently fighting for the Portland Wolfpack of the International Fight League
- Chael Sonnen – professional mixed martial arts (MMA) fighter
- Gus Sonnenberg – professional wrestler and boxer
- Seth Rollins – professional wrestler of Armenian, German & Irish descent
- Jon Heidenreich – former professional wrestler and former football player
- Katarina Waters – professional wrestler

=== Other sports ===
- Lisa Aukland – professional bodybuilder and powerlifter
- Earl W. Bascom – professional rodeo cowboy, inductee in several rodeo halls of fame
- Tony Bettenhausen and his race-driving sons Gary, Tony Jr., and Merle; Tony was at times nicknamed "Der Panzer" due to his ancestry and driving style
- Jana Bieger – two-time World Champion artistic gymnast
- Gretchen Bleiler – professional halfpipe snowboarder and pioneer
- Greg Bretz – Olympic snowboarder
- George Brosius – gymnastics teacher associated from 1854 to 1915 with the Milwaukee Turnverein, he served in the Union Army from 1861 to 1864
- Dale Earnhardt – race car driver in NASCAR's top division
- Dale Earnhardt Jr. – semi-retired professional stock car racing driver, team owner, author analyst for NASCAR on NBC
- Gertrude Ederle – Olympic Gold Medal winner and first woman to swim the English Channel
- George Eyser – gymnast who competed in the 1904 Summer Olympics with a wooden leg
- Bobby Fischer – chess grandmaster and World Chess Champion between 1972 and 1975
- Christopher Fogt – Army captain who won a bronze medal at the 2014 Olympic Games in Sochi as a member of the famed Team Night Train
- Gretchen Fraser – alpine ski racer; first American to win an Olympic gold medal for skiing
- Archie Hahn – sprinter in the early 20th century
- Hans Halberstadt – Olympic fencer
- J. R. Hildebrand – Formula One and IndyCar Series race car driver
- Margaret Hoelzer – Olympic swimmer
- Katie Hoff – Olympic medal-winning swimmer
- Mark Geiger – soccer referee in Major League Soccer in the United States and Canada, as well as CONCACAF and the World Cup
- Harry Greb – professional boxer, nicknamed "The Pittsburgh Windmill", he was the American Light Heavyweight Champion, 1922–1923 and World Middleweight Champion, 1923–1926
- Kasey Kahne – dirt track racing driver and former professional stock car racing driver
- Evel Knievel – motorcycle daredevil
- Henry Laskau – racewalker
- Helene Mayer – Olympic champion fencer
- Kimmie Meissner – U.S. national champion figure skater
- Josef Newgarden – IndyCar Series driver, driving the 21 car for Ed Carpenter Racing
- Jordan Niebrugge – amateur golfer currently playing collegiate golf at Oklahoma State University
- Robert Oberst – professional strongman
- Michael Phelps – swimmer; has won 16 Olympic medals
- Craig Sager – sports journalist for TBS and TNT
- Allison Schmitt – swimmer
- Lacy Schnoor – Olympic skier
- Mark Spitz – swimmer and Olympic gold medalist
- Sara Studebaker – biathlete who has competed on the World Cup circuit
- Dana Vollmer – swimmer and Olympic gold medalist
- Lindsey Vonn – alpine skier
- Thomas Vonn – alpine skier
- Rudolph "Minnesota Fats" Wanderone (1913–1996) – perhaps the best known pool player in the United States
- Dick Weber – bowling professional and a founding member of the Professional Bowlers Association (PBA), father of Pete Weber
- Pete Weber – bowling professional on the Professional Bowlers Association (PBA) Tour
- Richard Weiss – slalom canoer
- Johnny Weissmuller – swimmer, Olympic gold medalist
- Rasa von Werder – bodybuilder
- Waldemar von Zedtwitz – German-born American bridge player and administrator

== Other ==
- Nicole Brown Simpson - murder victim and ex-wife of former football player O. J. Simpson

== See also ==
- German-American Heritage Foundation of the USA
- German Americans in the American Civil War
- German Canadians
- List of Amish and their descendants
- List of Germans
- List of German Texans
- List of German inventors and discoverers
